= Weeley railway station =

Railway station in Essex, England

Weeley
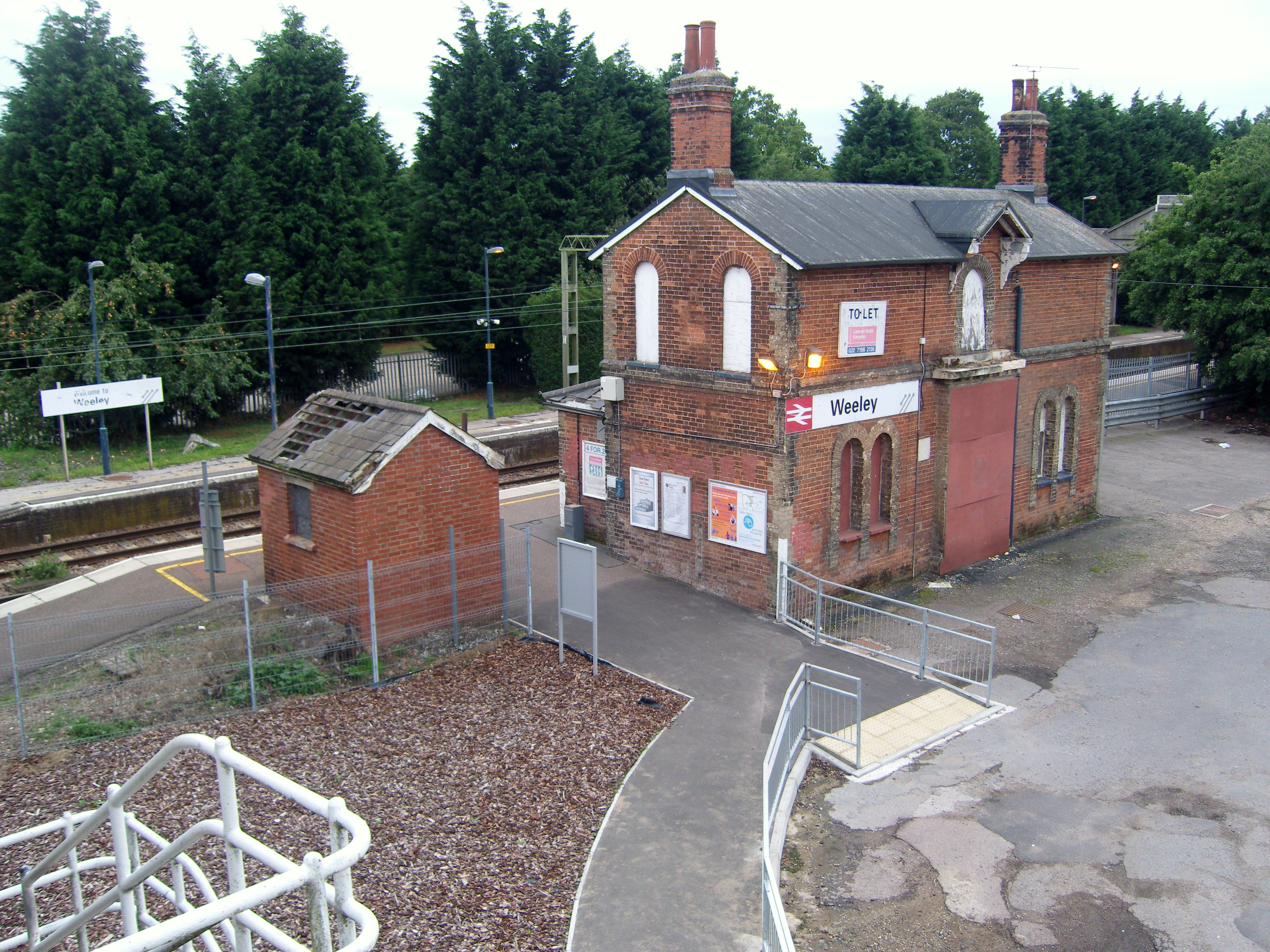

General information
- Location: Weeley, Tendring; England
- Coordinates: 51.853°N 1.115°E
- Grid reference: TM146217
- Manager: Greater Anglia
- Platforms: 2

Other information
- Station code: WEE
- Classification: DfT category F2

History
- Original company: Tendring Hundred Railway
- Pre-grouping: Great Eastern Railway
- Post-grouping: London and North Eastern Railway

Key dates
- 8 January 1866: Opened

Passengers
- 2021/22: ▲30,360
- 2022/23: ▲32,642
- 2023/24: ▲35,504
- 2024/25: ▲42,386
- 2025/26: ▲46,626
Location
Notes
- Passenger statistics from the Office of Rail and Road

Weeley railway station is on the Sunshine Coast Line, a branch of the Great Eastern Main Line, in the East of England, serving the village of Weeley, Essex. It is 62 miles 78 chains (101.3 km) down the line from London Liverpool Street and is situated between Great Bentley to the west and Thorpe-le-Soken to the east. Its three-letter station code is WEE.

The station was opened by the Tendring Hundred Railway, a subsidiary of the Great Eastern Railway, in 1866. It is currently managed by Greater Anglia, which also operates all trains serving the station.

== History ==
The station was opened on 8 January 1866 by the Tendring Hundred Railway, a subsidiary of the Great Eastern Railway.

The original level crossing beside the station was replaced by a flyover as part of the first Weeley by-pass in the 1930s.

In 2011 the station received a minor facelift, which included the addition of an accessible ramp with hand rails, updated warning signs, and a clean-up. In 2014 a footbridge of modular steel construction connecting the platforms was installed, replacing the old concrete structure.

Since the original station building has been disused for many years, in 2016 it was reported that the franchisee, Greater Anglia, planned to demolish it and provide platform shelters in its place. It also planned to demolish the station buildings at Alresford and Kirby Cross. The buildings were subsequently offered to Tendring District Council for £1 each, should the council wish to renovate them.

== Services ==
The typical off-peak service is of one train per hour to Colchester and one to Walton-on-the-Naze. Due to its low patronage – the lowest of all the stations on the Sunshine Coast Line – Weeley is closed on Sundays. There are some additional services running to and from London Liverpool Street and Clacton-on-Sea during peak hours.

Operator	Route	Rolling stock	Typical frequency	Notes
Greater Anglia	Colchester - Colchester Town - Hythe - Wivenhoe - Alresford - Great Bentley - Weeley - Thorpe-le-Soken - Kirby Cross - Frinton-on-Sea - Walton-on-the-Naze	Class 720	1x per hour	Not Sundays

Preceding station	National Rail	Following station
Great Bentley	Greater Anglia Sunshine Coast Line Monday-Saturday only	Thorpe-le-Soken
