= Great Bentley =

Village in Essex, England

Coordinates: 51°51′08″N 1°03′53″E

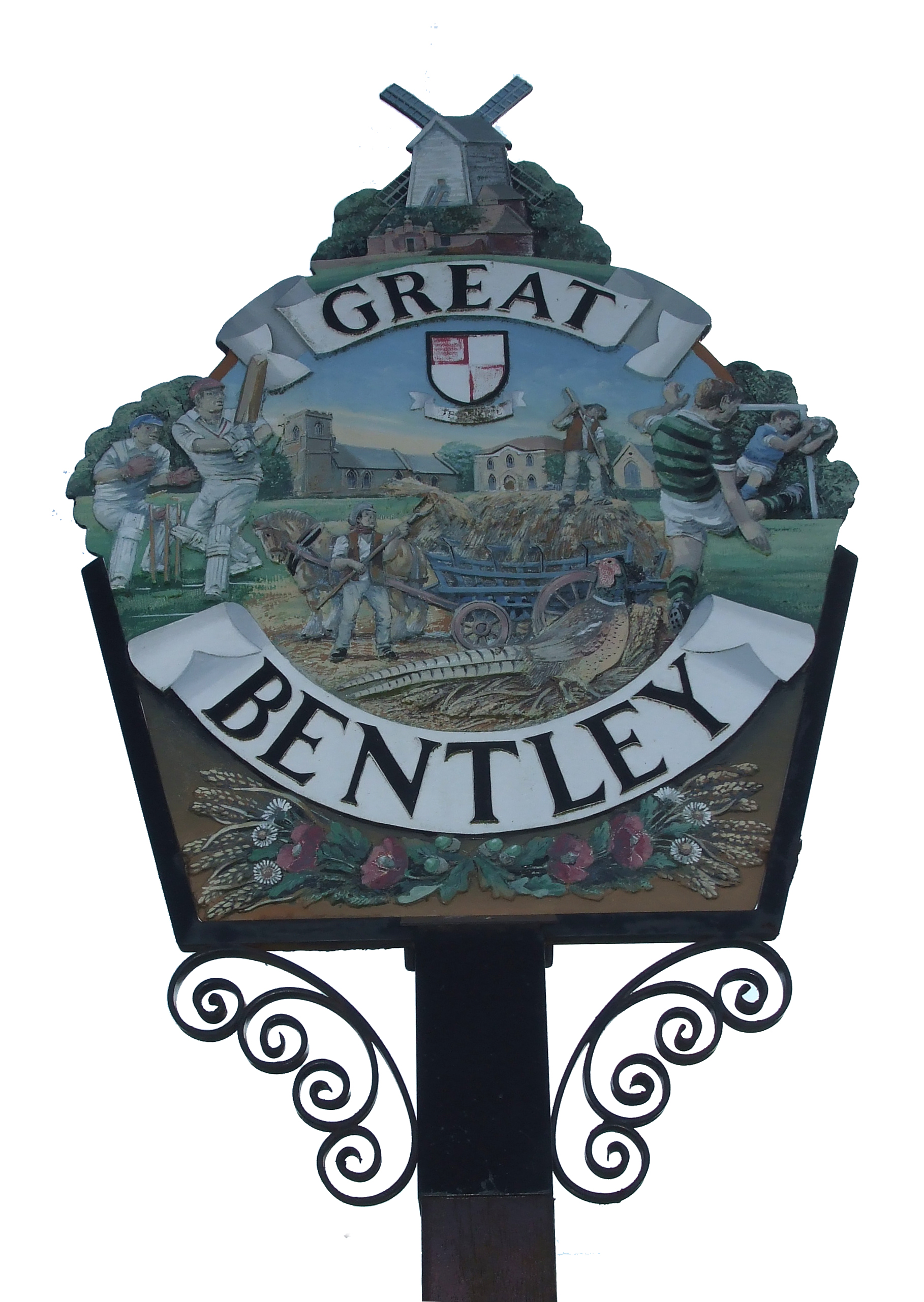
- The village sign

- Location within Essex
- Population: 2,517 (Parish, 2021)
- OS grid reference: TM110215
- District: Tendring
- Shire county: Essex
- Region: East
- Country: England
- Sovereign state: United Kingdom
- Post town: Colchester
- Postcode district: CO7
- Dialling code: 01206
- Police: Essex
- Fire: Essex
- Ambulance: East of England
- UK Parliament: Clacton
- Website: greatbentleyparishcouncil.co.uk

Great Bentley is a village and civil parish in the Tendring district of north east Essex, England, located seven miles east of Colchester. The village is scattered round an extensive level or common, of 43 acres (17 ha), on the eastern side of the vale of a rivulet, seven miles (11 km) east-south-east of Colchester. This common is the second largest village green in the United Kingdom, at a size of 43 acres (17 ha), behind Duncan Down, and has won 'Essex Village of the Year' and 'Daily Telegraph/Calor Gas Village of the Year' awards. The parish has an area of 3,188 acres (12.90 km^{2}) and extends southward to Flag Creek, a tidal creek that connects with the Colne, near Brightlingsea. It includes the hamlets of Aingers Green and South Heath. At the 2021 census the parish had a population of 2,517. Great Bentley railway station provides the village with frequent rail services along the Sunshine Coast Line to London Liverpool Street, Clacton-on-Sea, Colchester and Walton-on-the-Naze.

== History ==
The village is mentioned as far back as the Domesday Book of 1086, and at that time it was situated amongst large wooded areas. The clearing of these woods began in 1135. In its early days, the village was known as Benetlea, then as Much Bentley, and later as Great Bentley. The first part of the name, "Bent," is thought to refer to a type of grass, and the latter part, "lea," probably derives from the word "ley," meaning land sown with grass, which suggests a direct reference to the green. Great Bentley had a port at Flag Creek, which was used for importing and exporting goods.

In 1557, four Protestant "heretics" from the village, including a young woman named Rose Allen, were arrested, and three were burned at the stake at Colchester Castle (the fourth died in prison). They are commemorated on a small monument alongside the Green. Their story appears in the famous Foxe's Book of Martyrs. Foxe calls the village "Much Bentley".

Queen Elizabeth I once visited Lord Darcy's residence, St Osyth Priory. It is believed she may have arrived at Harwich accompanied by her courtiers and rode via Horsley Cross, Little Bentley, then on to Great Bentley Green before finishing her journey to St Osyth. Great Bentley owes much of its growth to the coming of the railway in 1866, with the railway station being named Bentley Green before being changed to its present title of Great Bentley in 1877.

Two new housing estates were built in the 1960s on either side of the Village Green. This was followed by the development of a trading estate near the railway station, now known as the Plough Road Business Centre. At that time, the village boasted five public houses, a post office, a garage, several small retail shops and businesses, a school and a doctor's surgery. All of these amenities remain to this day, except for the post office and three of the public houses. Also in the 1960s, Great Bentley Parish Council, on behalf of the village, purchased the manorial rights of the 42.5 acres (17.2 ha) of Common Land. A significant portion of the purchase price was raised through voluntary donations from residents and fundraising events. The land was then registered as a village green to protect the Green for the future from encroachment and erosion. The Village Green and its surrounding properties are designated as a Conservation Area. The Parish Council, through the Common Land and Village Green Acts, ensures the protection of the Village Green.

== Great Bentley Primary School ==
Great Bentley School was built in 1896, and its front façade is a good example of a school built in the late Victorian era. The school retains many of its original features, including wooden parquet flooring and high ceilings in the original part of the building. Several extensions have been added to the school over the years, and the most recent was completed in 2024. In the year 2000, a clock was added to the centre of the original building in commemoration of the new millennium. The school currently has 210 pupils aged between 4 and 11 years. The school is maintained by Essex County Council, and is now called Great Bentley County Primary School. The school's catchment area includes the nearby villages of Thorrington, Frating, Aingers Green and Little Bentley. The 2015 Ofsted report gave the school a rating of 'Outstanding', praising the improvements made since previous inspections to bring about improvements in teaching, learning and assessment.

== Great Bentley Football Club ==
Great Bentley Football Club was founded between 1895 and 1896, and its original headquarters were the Victory Inn public house (now a hair salon) in Great Bentley. The club now has its own clubhouse and dressing rooms built on the site of an old World War II Nissen hut in 1959. In 2009, new dressing room and bar facilities were completed to replace this, costing £220,000. The new facilities were officially opened by Lord John Bassam of Brighton, who used to play for the club. The club has three senior teams; two of these play in the Essex and Suffolk Border Football League, and the other in the Colchester and East Essex Football League. On 8 August 2009, a friendly was played against Colchester United on the Village Green as part of the grand opening of the new dressing rooms and bar.

== Village green ==
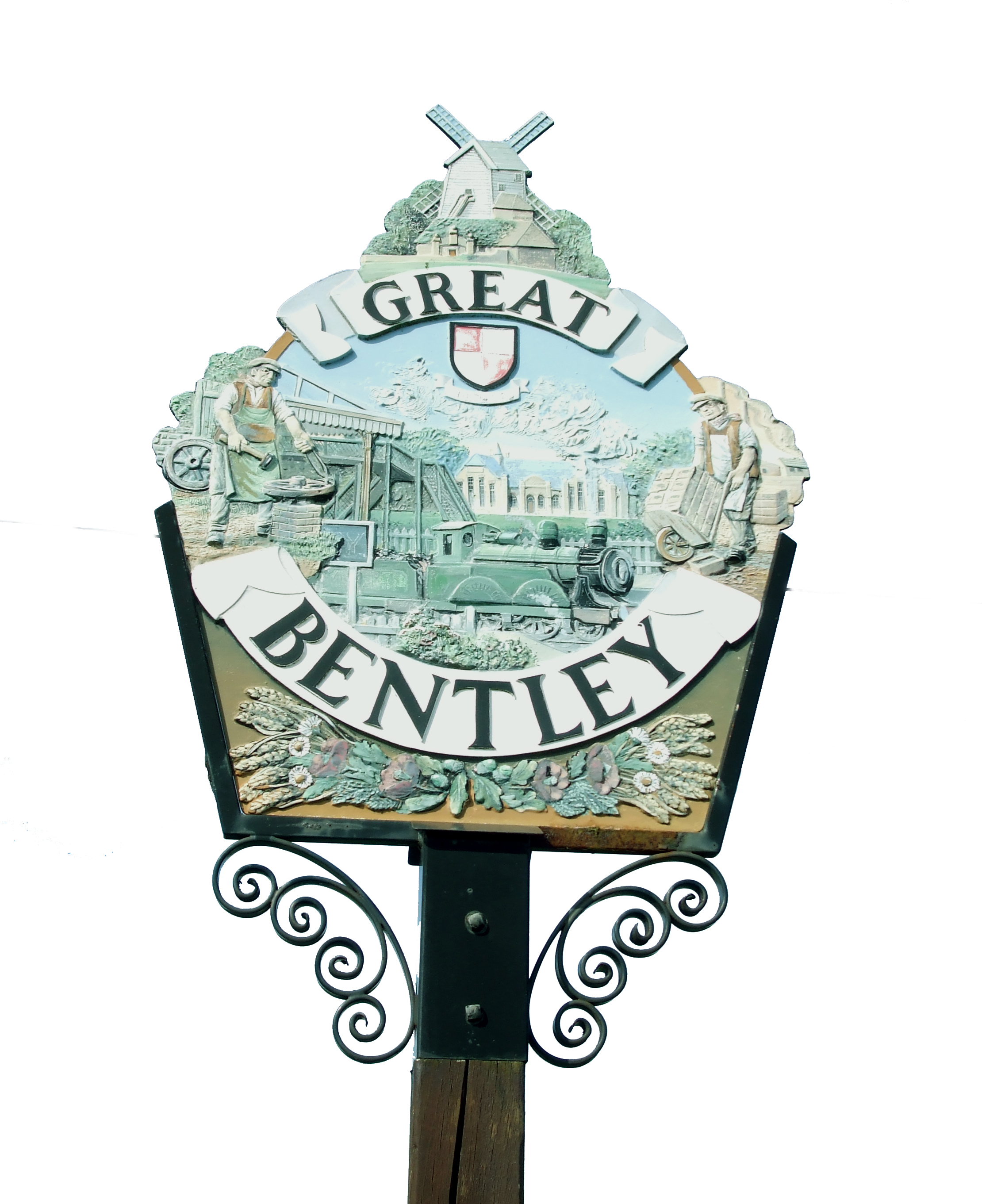
The other side of the village sign

The village green covers some 43 acres (170,000 m^{2}) and is reputed to be one of the largest in England. The village green was the site of a steam mill, which was built in 1886. The mill chimney was demolished in 1925, and what remains of the structure today has been converted into apartments. Adjacent to the mill was a large pond, which no longer exists, and a handful of willow trees mark the spot. To the north of the mill is a children's play area and a small nature reserve containing various species of grasses that can only be found in the local area.. To the east of this is the old mill house where a windmill once stood within the walled gardens of the house, but this was also demolished in the late 19th century.

The green has long been used for various recreational and sporting events. In Edwardian times, it was used as a golf course, and today the local cricket and football teams can often be seen playing matches. During the last weekend of June, the green has provided the venue for Great Bentley Village Carnival and Fete every year since 1974. In recent years, the Green has also become popular with motorcyclists from around the country. During the summer months, the Green becomes the site of a mini motorcycle rally on Wednesday evenings.

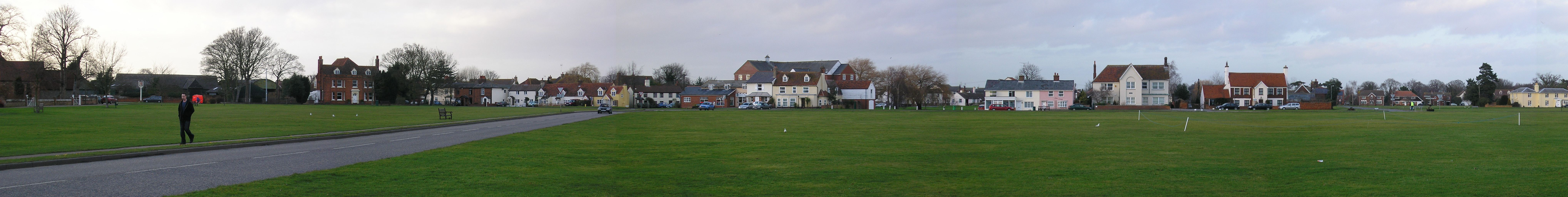
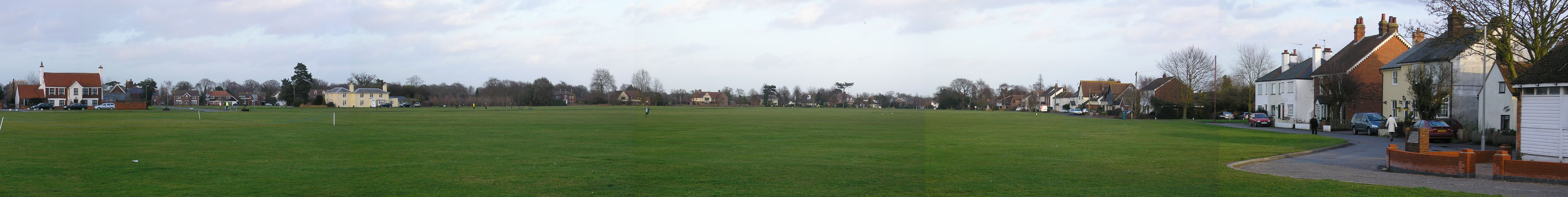

== Notable residents ==
- Dominic Barrett, professional tenpin bowler and 2013 PBA World Champion, now resides in the village.
- Lord Bassam, previously Opposition Chief Whip in the House of Lords, grew up in the village and attended the local primary school.
- Maud de Ufford, Countess of Essex, who was arrested and later pardoned for conspiring against King Henry IV of England in 1404.
- John Sydenham Furnivall, a former Cambridge University scholar and later British colonial administrator to Burma, was born in the village.
- Michael Steele, involved in the 1995 Rettendon murders, for which he and accomplice Jack Whomes were found guilty of murder in 1998 at the Old Bailey. The murders were used as the basis for the 2000 film Essex Boys, and the 2007 film Rise of the Footsoldier. Both men have always protested their innocence.

== Public houses ==
Until the 1980s, Great Bentley had five public houses. These were the Red Lion (now used as offices), the Victory Inn (now a hair salon), Dusty's Wine Bar (now the pharmacy), The Plough Inn and The Royal Fusilier at Aingers Green re-opened in August 2019. The Plough Inn is still in business today.

== Transport ==
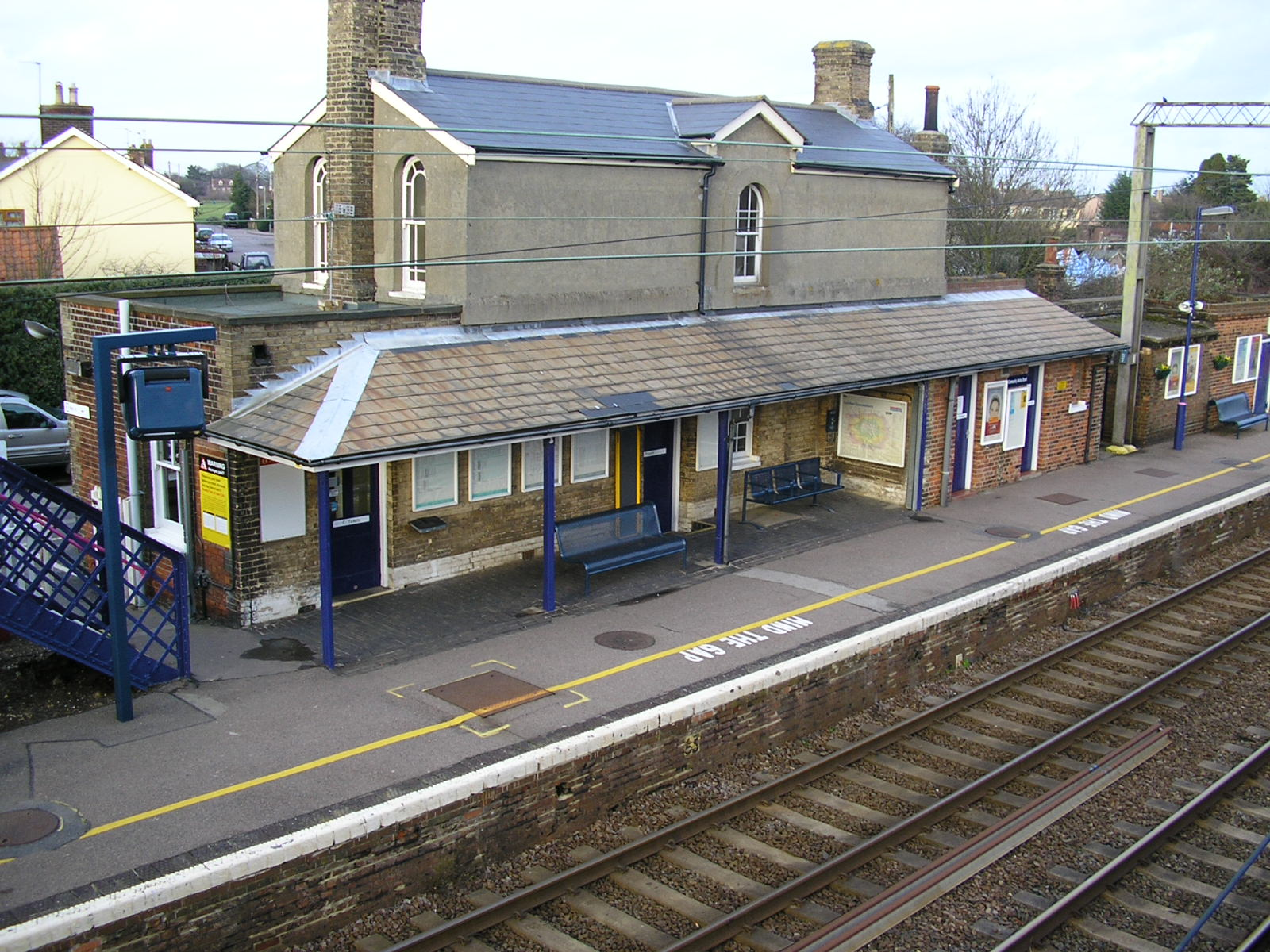
Great Bentley railway station

=== Road ===
- The A133 road runs through the north of the village and provides access to Colchester and Clacton-on-Sea, and onwards via the A120 and A12 to Chelmsford and London.
- The B1027 road links the village to Colchester and Clacton-on-Sea via St Osyth.
- The B1029 road links the village to Brightlingsea and Dedham.

=== Bus ===
Bus services to Colchester and neighbouring communities are provided by Arriva Colchester.

=== Rail ===
Great Bentley railway station is located on the Sunshine Coast Line, a branch of the Great Eastern Main Line. The village is served by local services to Colchester and Walton-on-the-Naze during off-peak hours as well as express services to London Liverpool Street and Clacton-on-Sea during peak hours. All services are operated by Greater Anglia.

The Sunshine Coast Line reached Great Bentley in 1866 and has contributed greatly towards the growth of the village ever since, effectively making Great Bentley a commuter village. It was the only form of public transport in the village from 1866 up until 2010 – the year in which a new local bus service to Colchester was launched, which may explain the high patronage for a village station. The station is used by commuters from within the village and from neighbouring towns and villages such as Brightlingsea, Frating, St Osyth and Thorrington.

== Saint Mary's Church ==
The church of St Mary the Virgin dates back to the 11th century, and was built by the Normans. The tower was added some 200 years later, and has recently undergone a £100,000 restoration project. The church itself is constructed from stone and flint, and still has its original door (the oldest surviving church door in the country), although it is no longer in use.

== Aingers Green ==
Aingers Green is a hamlet to the south of the village of Great Bentley. In Plough Lane stands Tom Swallow Cottage, a Grade II listed 17th-century building. Nikolaus Pevsner in his survey of Essex highlighted the Old School House from 1887 by E. Geldart and J. R. Vining. In 2010, an archaeological dig was conducted in St. Mary's Road as part of a housing development, which revealed that the land had been in use since the 13th century but not continuous occupation.
