= Frinton-on-Sea railway station =

Railway station in Essex, England

Frinton-on-Sea
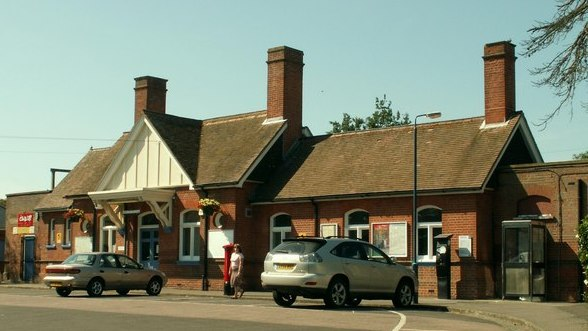

General information
- Location: Frinton-on-Sea, Tendring District, England
- Coordinates: 51.838°N 1.243°E
- Grid reference: TM235204
- Managed by: Greater Anglia
- Platforms: 1

Other information
- Station code: FRI
- Classification: DfT category E

History
- Original company: Tendring Hundred Railway
- Pre-grouping: Great Eastern Railway
- Post-grouping: London and North Eastern Railway

Key dates
- July 1888: Opened as Frinton
- 20 May 2007: Renamed Frinton-on-Sea

Passengers
- 2020/21: ▼51,010
- 2021/22: ▲0.135 million
- 2022/23: ▲0.159 million
- 2023/24: ▲0.179 million
- 2024/25: ▲0.209 million
Location
Notes
- Passenger statistics from the Office of Rail and Road

Frinton-on-Sea railway station serves the seaside town of Frinton-on-Sea, in Essex, England. It lies on the Walton branch of the Sunshine Coast Line, 68 miles 66 chains (110.8 km) down the line from London Liverpool Street; it is situated between Kirby Cross to the west and Walton-on-the-Naze to the east. The station was opened by Great Eastern Railway in 1888. It is currently managed by Greater Anglia, which also operates all trains serving the station.

== History ==
This section of line was built as the Tendring Hundred Railway and opened in 1867. The Tendring Hundred Railway was operated by the Great Eastern Railway, which subsequently bought the line and the adjacent Clacton-on-Sea Railway on 1 July 1883.

When the line first opened, there was no station at Frinton, which was then a very small village. The nearest stations were at Kirby Cross and Walton-on-the-Naze. In the mid-1880s, developers began to lay out a new resort town at Frinton and reached an agreement with the railway company to build a new station. The station was opened with the name Frinton in July 1888.

The line became part of the London and North Eastern Railway (LNER) in 1923. In 1929, the LNER introduced luxurious Pullman day excursion trips from Liverpool Street to various seaside resorts. The service known as the Eastern Belle served Felixstowe on Mondays, Frinton and Walton on Tuesdays, Clacton on Wednesdays, and Thorpeness and Aldeburgh on Thursdays and Fridays. The service ended in September 1939 at the outset of World War II.

The station then became part of the Eastern Region of British Railways in 1948, following nationalisation of the railways.

The station lies immediately to the west of a level crossing that provides road access to Frinton. Residents of the town who live inside the gates of the crossing attach a particular status to this fact. These wooden gates were, until 2009, the only manually'-operated level crossing gates on the line. The level crossing is now protected by a barrier system.

The station's name was changed to Frinton-on-Sea in 2007.

== Services ==
The current service pattern is:

Operator	Route	Rolling stock	Frequency	Notes
Greater Anglia	Colchester - Colchester Town - Hythe - Wivenhoe - Alresford - Great Bentley - Weeley - Thorpe-le-Soken - Kirby Cross - Frinton-on-Sea - Walton-on-the-Naze	Class 720	1x per hour	Monday-Saturday
Greater Anglia	Thorpe-le-Soken - Kirby Cross - Frinton-on-Sea - Walton-on-the-Naze	Class 720	1x per hour	Sunday

Passengers for Clacton-on-Sea must change at Thorpe-le-Soken for a connection.

Preceding station	National Rail	Following station
Kirby Cross	Greater Anglia Sunshine Coast Line; Walton branch	Walton-on-the-Naze
