= Great Bentley railway station =

Railway station in Essex, England

Great Bentley
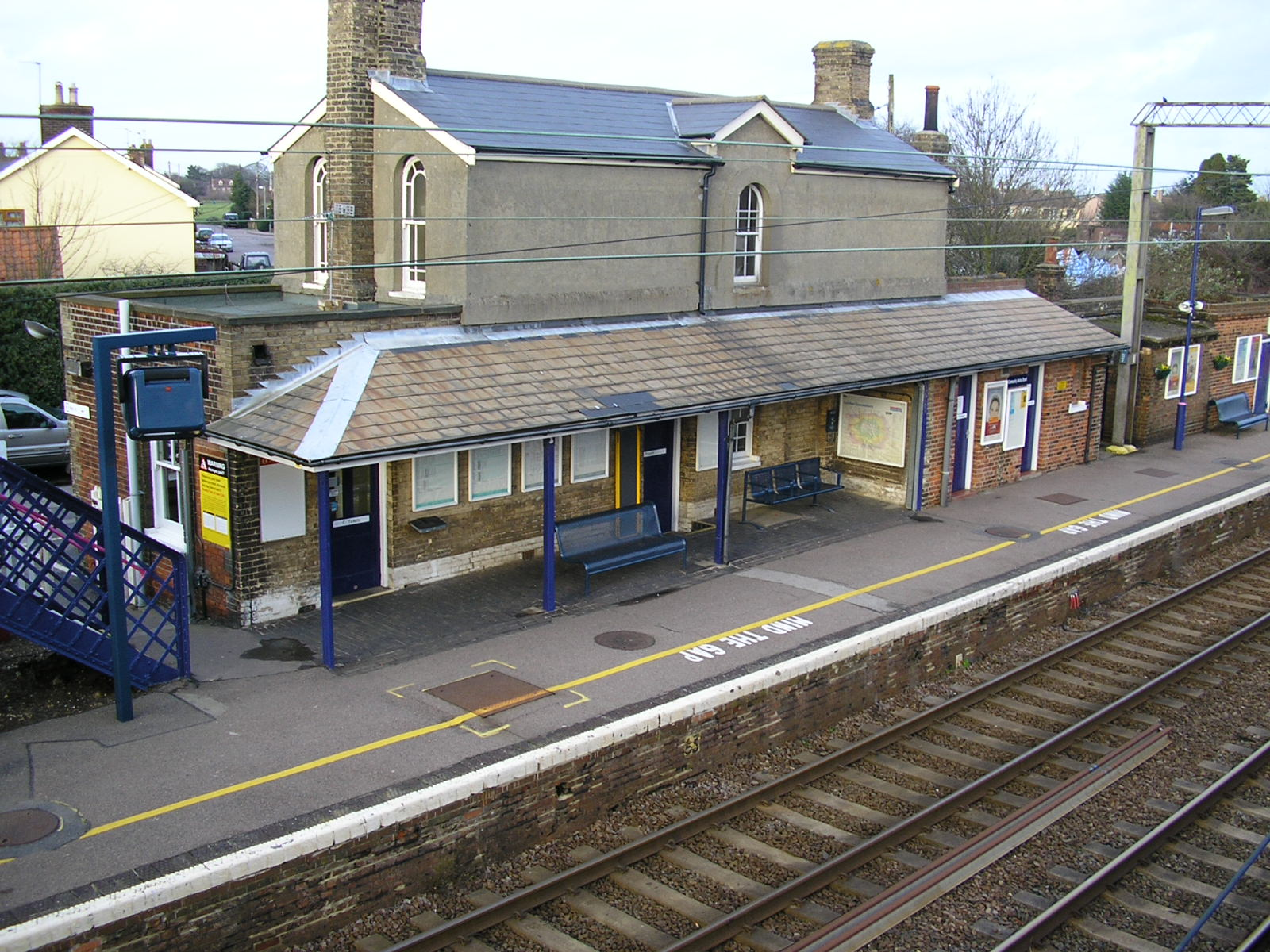
- Great Bentley railway station

General information
- Location: Great Bentley, Tendring; England
- Coordinates: 51.852°N 1.065°E
- Grid reference: TM112214
- Managed by: Greater Anglia
- Platforms: 2

Other information
- Station code: GRB
- Classification: DfT category E

Key dates
- 8 January 1866: Opened as Bentley Green
- 1877: Renamed Great Bentley

Passengers
- 2020/21: ▼18,728
- 2021/22: ▲50,764
- 2022/23: ▲64,860
- 2023/24: ▲85,784
- 2024/25: ▲105,230
Location
Notes
- Passenger statistics from the Office of Rail and Road

Great Bentley railway station is on the Sunshine Coast Line, a branch of the Great Eastern Main Line, in the East of England, serving the village of Great Bentley as well as the nearby settlements of Brightlingsea, Frating, Thorrington and St Osyth. It is 60 miles 66 chains (97.9 km) down the line from London Liverpool Street and is situated between Alresford to the west and Weeley to the east. Its three-letter station code is GRB.

The station was opened by the Tendring Hundred Railway, a subsidiary of the Great Eastern Railway, in 1866 with the name Bentley Green. It was renamed Great Bentley in 1877. It is currently managed by Greater Anglia, which also operates all trains serving the station.

== History ==
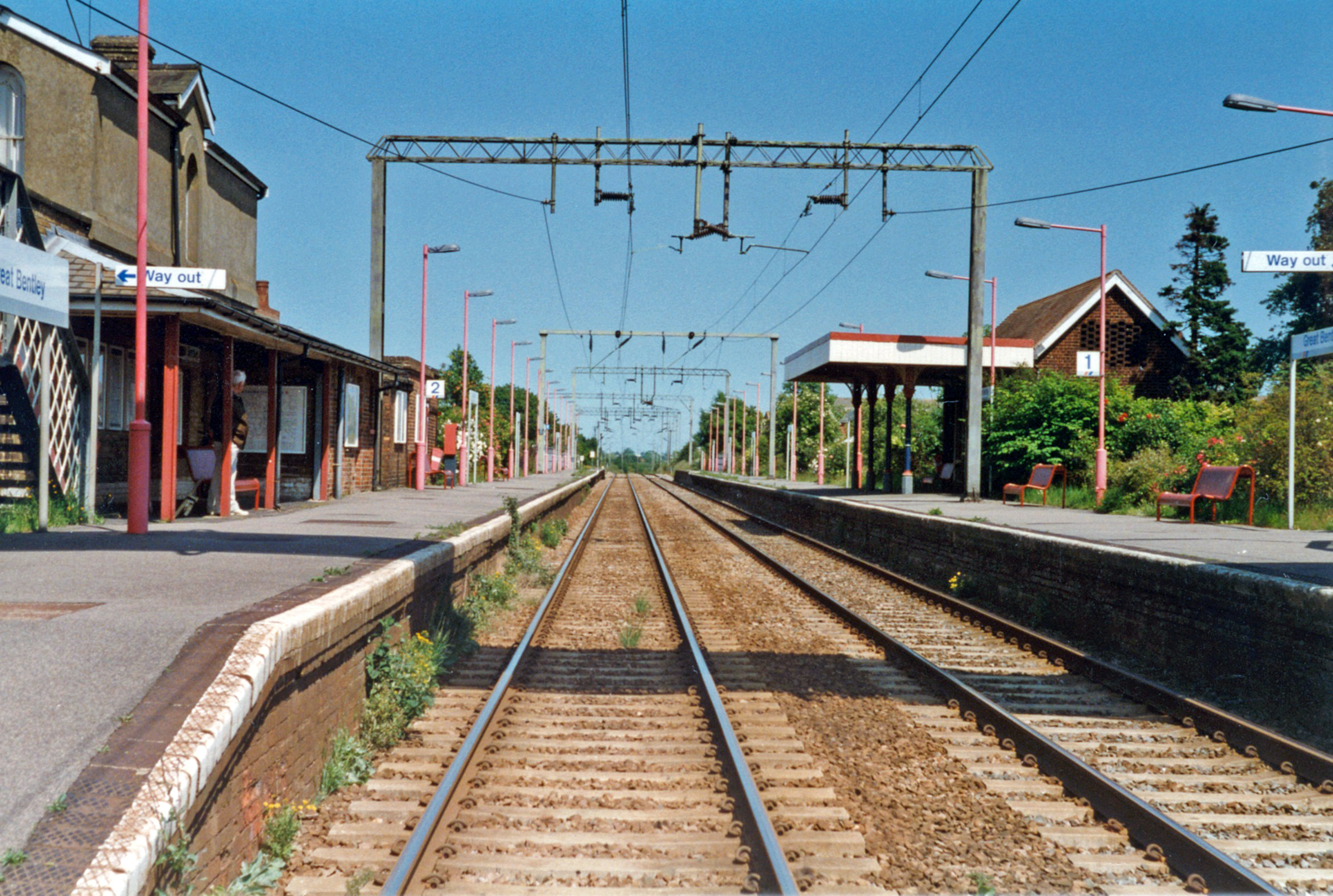
Great Bentley railway station in June 1997

In 1859 the Tendring Hundred Railway was formed to extend the branch line from Hythe to Wivenhoe, which opened on 8 May 1863 for both passenger and goods services from . Colchester. From the outset in 1863 the Great Eastern Railway (GER) the operated the line. In 1883 the Tendring Hundred Railway Company was vested into the GER.

The line was then extended to Weeley on 8 January 1866. Bentley Green station opened on the same day. It adopted its current name of Great Bentley in 1877.

Initially the station was served by a single track but the line was doubled between Great Bentley and Thorpe-le-Soken by the GER in 1891. The Wivenhoe to Great Bentley section was doubled in 1898.

Operation of the station passed to the London and North Eastern Railway in 1923. In 1948 the station became part of the Eastern Region of British Railways. The 1955 modernisation plan proposed the electrification of the line through Great Bentley and electric services commenced on 13 April 1959.

There was once a small goods yard to the east of the station which had cattle pens, coal wharves and an end loading ramp. In later years the main traffic was coal, agricultural fertilisers and sugar beet. The yard was closed in the 1950s.

Network Rail replaced the manually-controlled level crossing gates at Great Bentley with barriers in 2008 as part of a £104 million resignalling project between Colchester and Clacton-on-Sea. The former signal box was located at the eastern end of the "up" (London-bound) platform and had 25 levers for the signals and points.

Great Bentley has two platforms. Platform 1 is used for westbound services towards Colchester and London Liverpool Street. Platform 2 is for eastbound services towards Clacton-on-Sea and Walton-on-the-Naze. When built, the two platforms were linked with a lattice footbridge. This was removed in the 1950s when the line was being prepared for electrification.

== Services ==
=== Current timetable ===
The typical service pattern is:

Operator	Route	Rolling stock	Frequency	Notes
Greater Anglia	Colchester - Colchester Town - Hythe - Wivenhoe - Alresford - Great Bentley - Weeley - Thorpe-le-Soken - Kirby Cross - Frinton-on-Sea - Walton-on-the-Naze	Class 720	1x per hour	Monday-Saturday
Greater Anglia	London Liverpool Street - Stratford - Shenfield - Chelmsford - Witham - Colchester - Wivenhoe - Alresford - Great Bentley - Thorpe-le-Soken - Clacton-on-Sea	Class 720	1x per hour	Sundays only

=== Historical timetables ===
The following services called in July 1922 (the last year of operation by the Great Eastern Railway):

- 8 up services (Monday-Saturday)
- 9 down services (Monday-Saturday)
- 4 up services (Sundays)
- 3 down services (Sundays)

In June 1956 the timetable showed:

- 17 up services to Colchester (Monday-Saturday)
- 15 down services to Clacton (Monday-Saturday)

During the summer of 1972 the timetable showed:

- 17 up services to Colchester (Monday-Friday)
- 18 down services to Clacton (Monday-Friday)

Some services worked through to Liverpool Street. On summer Saturdays, 24 down and 21 up trains called.

Preceding station	National Rail	Following station
Alresford	Greater Anglia Sunshine Coast Line	Weeley
Historical railways
Thorington Line open, station closed	Great Eastern Railway Tendring Hundred Extension Railway	Weeley Line and station open
