= Kirby Cross railway station =

Railway station in Essex, England

Coordinates: 51.841°N 1.215°E

Kirby Cross
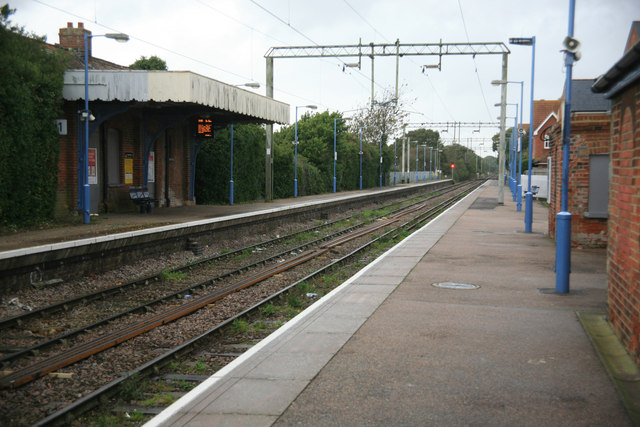
- The station in October 2012

General information
- Location: Kirby Cross, Tendring; England
- Grid reference: TM215207
- Managed by: Abellio Greater Anglia
- Platforms: 2

Other information
- Station code: KBX
- Classification: DfT category F2

History
- Original company: Tendring Hundred Railway
- Pre-grouping: Great Eastern Railway
- Post-grouping: London and North Eastern Railway

Key dates
- 28 July 1866: Opened

Passengers
- 2020/21: ▼13,726
- 2021/22: ▲36,664
- 2022/23: ▲48,908
- 2023/24: ▲58,260
- 2024/25: ▲62,896
Location
Notes
- Passenger statistics from the Office of Rail and Road

Kirby Cross railway station is on the Walton branch of the Sunshine Coast Line in the East of England, serving the village of Kirby Cross, Essex. It is 67 miles 55 chains (108.9 km) down the line from London Liverpool Street and is situated between Thorpe-le-Soken to the west and Frinton-on-Sea to the east. Its three-letter station code is KBX.

It is currently managed by Greater Anglia, which also operates all trains serving the station.

== History ==
The station was opened by the Tendring Hundred Railway, a subsidiary of the Great Eastern Railway, in 1866.

The station has two platforms with eastbound and westbound lines, but either side of the station the line is single-track.

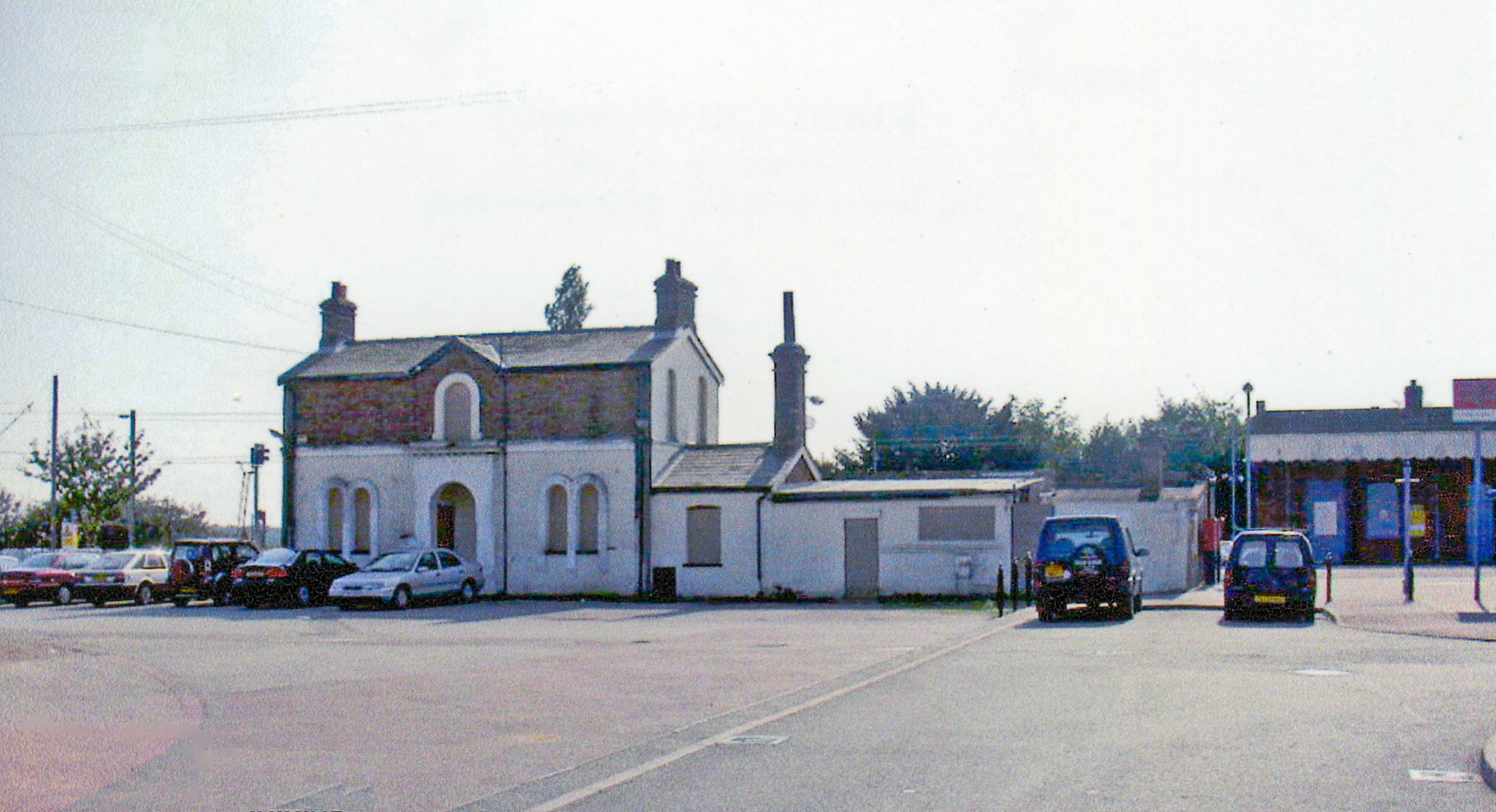
The long-disused station building, September 2008

The original station building has been disused for many years and has not been staffed since the 1990s. In 2016 it was reported that the line franchisee, Abellio Greater Anglia, planned to demolish the station building and provide platform shelters in its place. It also planned to demolish the station buildings at Weeley and Alresford. The buildings were subsequently offered to Tendring Borough Council for £1 each, should the council wish to renovate them.

== Accidents and incidents ==
On 5 April 1981 eight people were injured in a low-speed head-on collision on the single-track line just east of Kirby Cross after an empty stock train passed a signal at 'danger'. The empty train collided with the 6:49 pm service for Thorpe-le-Soken which was carrying 20 passengers, of whom five were hospitalised. An investigation confirmed the empty train's driver erroneously passed the signal at 'danger'.

== Services ==
The typical off-peak service is:

Operator	Route	Rolling stock	Frequency	Notes
Greater Anglia	Colchester - Colchester Town - Hythe - Wivenhoe - Alresford - Great Bentley - Weeley - Thorpe-le-Soken - Kirby Cross - Frinton-on-Sea - Walton-on-the-Naze	Class 720	1x per hour	

Passengers for Clacton-on-Sea must change at Thorpe-le-Soken for a connecting service from London Liverpool Street. On Sundays, passengers for Colchester must change at Thorpe-le-Soken.

During peak hours there are some additional services to and from London Liverpool Street.

Preceding station	National Rail	Following station
Thorpe-le-Soken	Greater Anglia Sunshine Coast Line; Walton branch	Frinton-on-Sea
