= Alresford railway station (Essex) =

Railway station in Essex, England

Coordinates: 51°51′14″N 0°59′49″E

Alresford
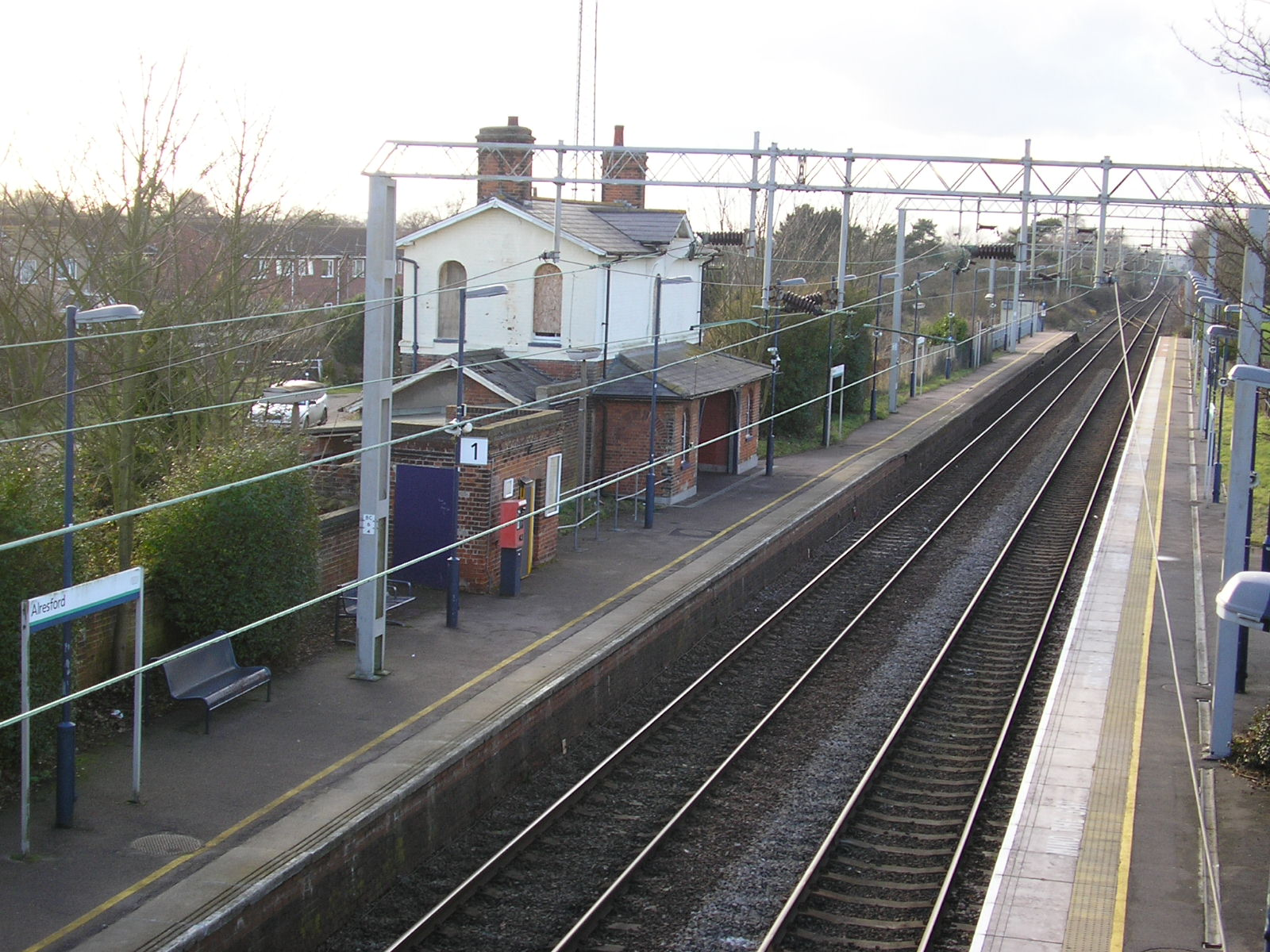

General information
- Location: Alresford, Tendring; England
- Grid reference: TM064215
- Managed by: Greater Anglia
- Platforms: 2

Other information
- Station code: ALR
- Classification: DfT category E

Key dates
- 8 January 1866: Opened

Passengers
- 2020/21: ▼15,816
- 2021/22: ▲47,180
- 2022/23: ▲63,450
- 2023/24: ▲85,564
- 2024/25: ▲97,088
Location
Notes
- Passenger statistics from the Office of Rail and Road

Alresford railway station is on the Sunshine Coast Line, a branch of the Great Eastern Main Line, in the East of England, serving the village of Alresford, Essex. It is 57 miles 63 chains (93.0 km) down the line from London Liverpool Street and is situated between Wivenhoe to the west and Great Bentley to the east. In official literature it is shown as Alresford (Essex) in order to distinguish it from the station of the same name in Hampshire. Its three-letter station code is ALR.

The station was opened by the Tendring Hundred Railway in 1866. It is currently managed by Greater Anglia, which also operates all trains serving the station.

== History ==
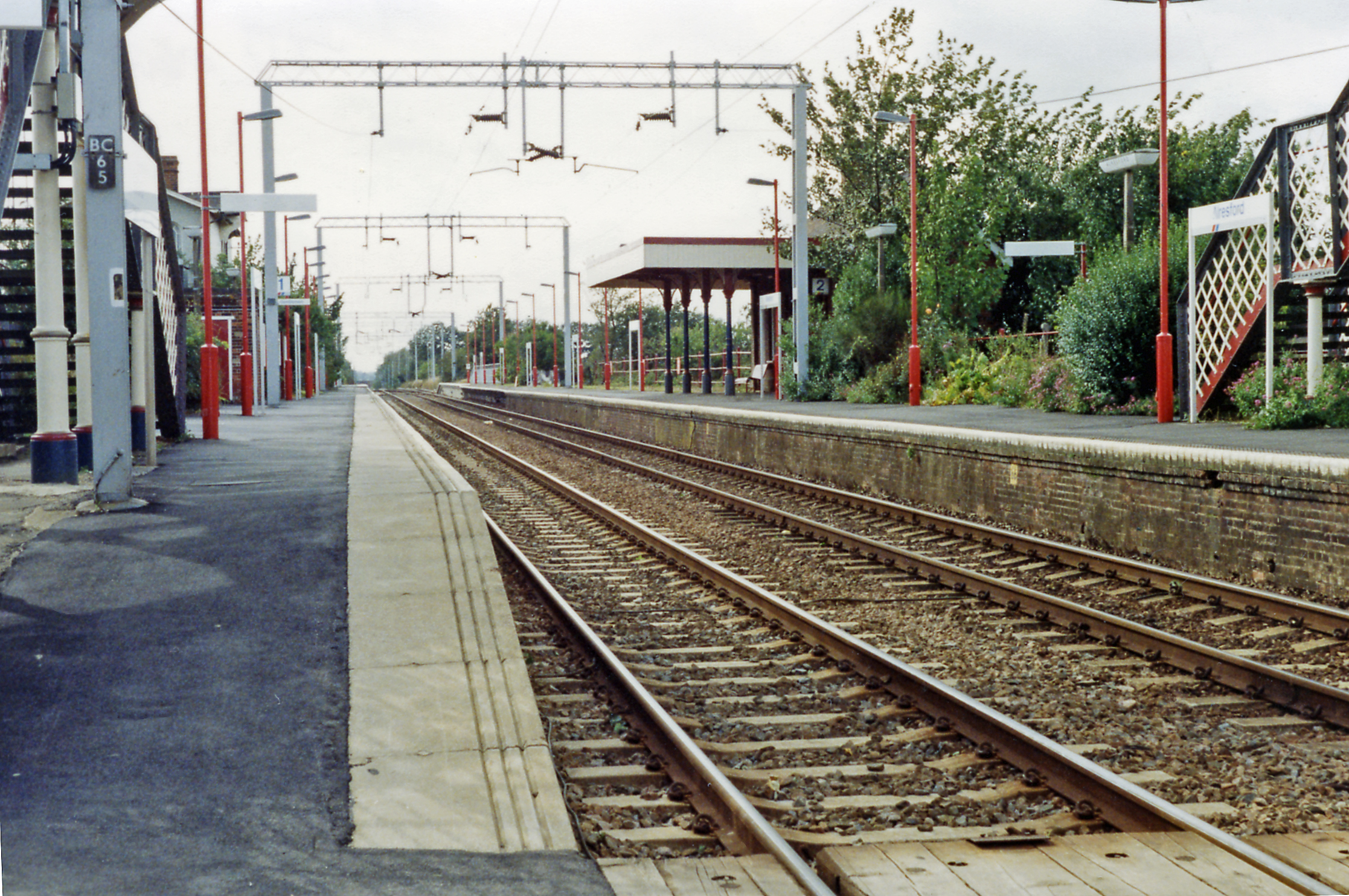
Alresford station in August 1992

The station and single-track railway line was built, and opened on March 4, 1866, by the Tendring Hundred Railway using trains from the Great Eastern Railway. Trains originally ran between St Botolph's, Colchester and Weeley five times per day. In 1867, the line was extended to Walton-on-the-Naze. In the early 1880's the Great Eastern Railway bought up the local railway companies. It later became part of the London and North Eastern Railway following the Grouping of 1923, and then passed to the Eastern Region of British Railways upon nationalisation in 1948. After sectorisation was introduced, the station was served by Network SouthEast until the privatisation of British Rail.

Prior to the electrification of the line, the ticket clerk operated the level crossing gates, the home and distant signals on both the "up" (London-bound) and "down" (country-bound) lines, and his own level crossing gate lock and the one for the level crossing a short distance down the line, at all times that the signal box was unstaffed. Edward Burbage fulfilled this duty for nearly 50 years. The crossing gates were replaced with automatic barriers as part of an upgrade of the line in 2008 and 2009.

Tickets are sold from a machine in Station Road as the original station building has been disused for many years but has been maintained by volunteers. In 2016 it was reported that the line franchisee, Abellio Greater Anglia, planned to demolish the station building and provide platform shelters in its place. It also planned to demolish the station buildings at Weeley and Kirby Cross. The buildings were subsequently offered to Tendring District Council for £1 each, should the council wish to renovate them.

== Services ==
The typical off-peak service pattern is:

Operator	Route	Rolling stock	Frequency	Notes
Greater Anglia	Colchester - Colchester Town - Hythe - Wivenhoe - Alresford - Great Bentley - Weeley - Thorpe-le-Soken - Kirby Cross - Frinton-on-Sea - Walton-on-the-Naze	Class 720	1x per hour	Monday-Saturday
Greater Anglia	London Liverpool Street - Stratford - Shenfield - Chelmsford - Witham - Colchester-Hythe- Wivenhoe - Alresford - Great Bentley - Thorpe-le-Soken - Clacton-on-Sea	Class 720	1x per hour	Sundays only

At peak times there are some additional services that are extended Walton-on-the-Naze services to London Liverpool Street or Clacton-on-Sea services stopping here

Preceding station	National Rail	Following station
Wivenhoe	Greater Anglia Sunshine Coast Line	Great Bentley
Historical railways
Wivenhoe Line and station open	Great Eastern Railway Tendring Hundred Extension Railway	Thorington Line open, station closed
