= Thorpe-le-Soken railway station =

Railway station in Essex, England

Thorpe-le-Soken
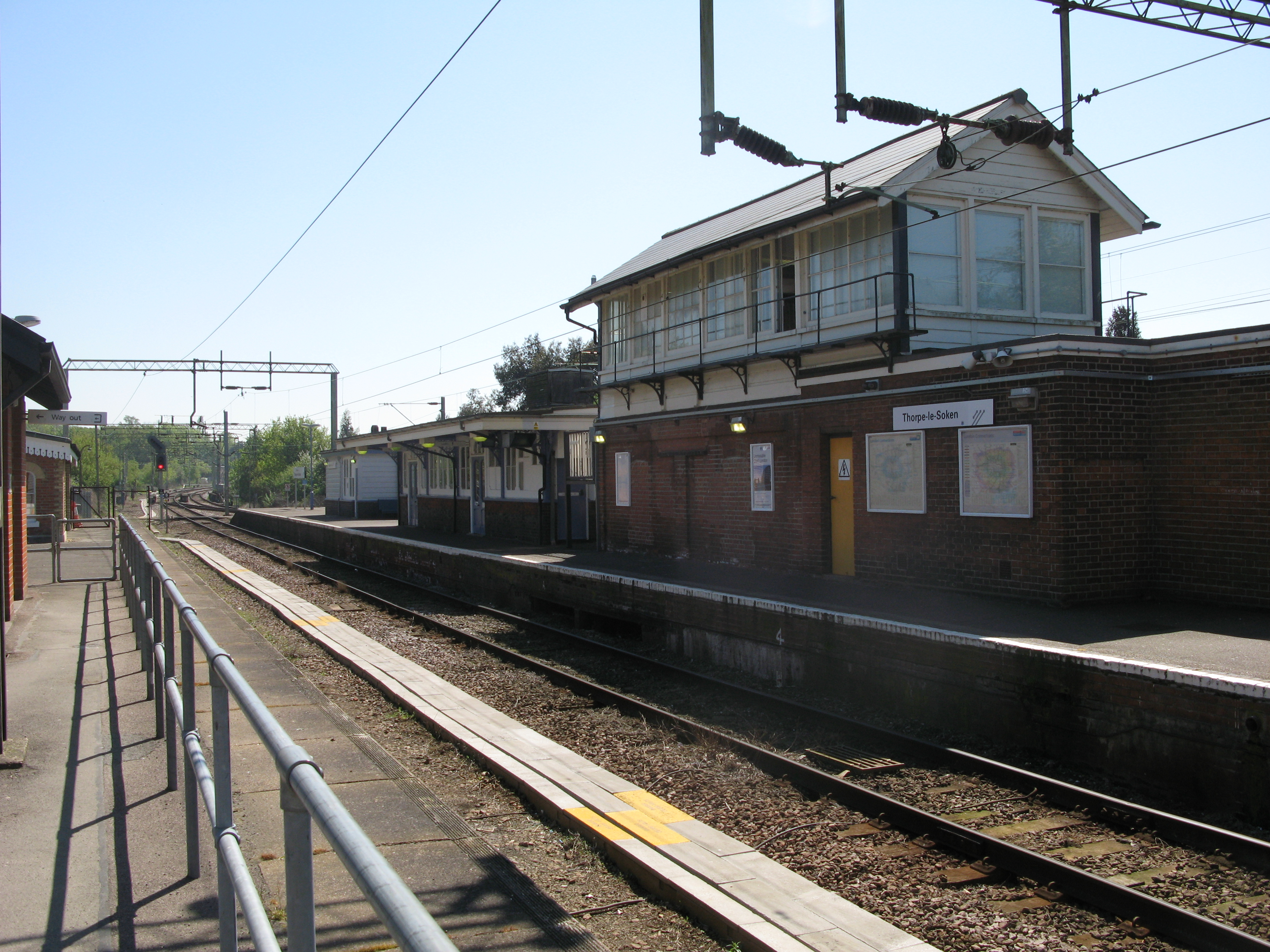
- Eastbound view from Platform 1 as seen in May 2008

General information
- Location: Thorpe-le-Soken, Tendring; England
- Coordinates: 51.848°N 1.162°E
- Grid reference: TM178212
- Managed by: Greater Anglia
- Platforms: 2

Other information
- Station code: TLS
- Classification: DfT category E

History
- Original company: Tendring Hundred Railway
- Pre-grouping: Great Eastern Railway
- Post-grouping: London and North Eastern Railway

Key dates
- 28 July 1866: Opened as Thorpe
- 1 March 1900: Renamed Thorpe-le-Soken

Passengers
- 2020/21: ▼32,264
- Interchange: ▼72,866
- 2021/22: ▲95,582
- Interchange: ▲0.192 million
- 2022/23: ▲0.119 million
- Interchange: ▲0.229 million
- 2023/24: ▲0.132 million
- Interchange: ▲0.270 million
- 2024/25: ▲0.143 million
- Interchange: ▲0.289 million
Location
Notes
- Passenger statistics from the Office of Rail and Road

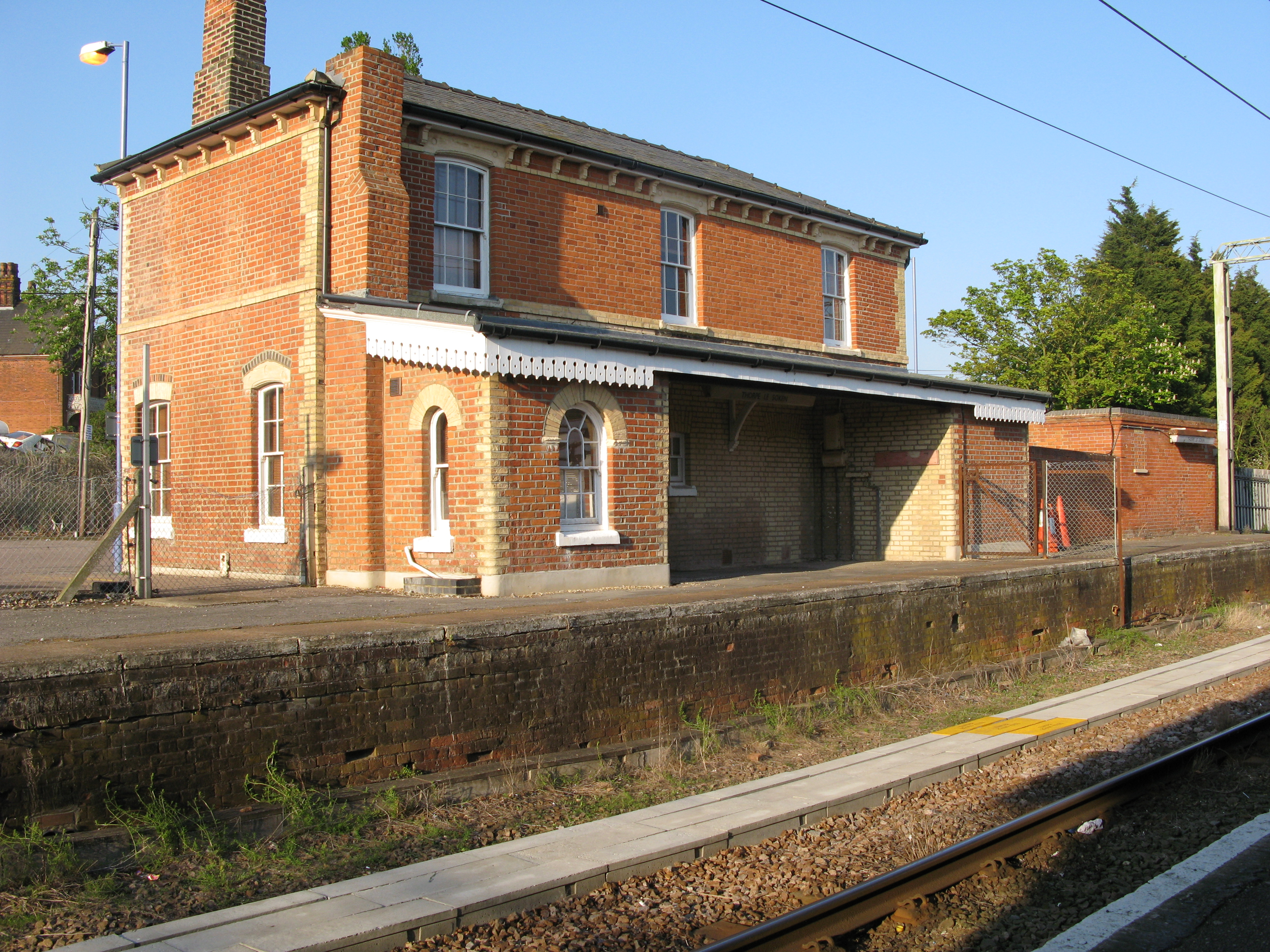
Station building, May 2008

Thorpe-le-Soken railway station is on the Sunshine Coast Line, a branch of the Great Eastern Main Line, in the East of England, serving the village of Thorpe-le-Soken, Essex. It is 65 miles 7 chains (104.7 km) down the line from London Liverpool Street. Its three-letter station code is TLS. To the west the preceding station is Weeley and to the east the following stations are Clacton-on-Sea on the single-stop Clacton branch or Kirby Cross on the branch to Walton-on-the-Naze.

The station was opened by the Tendring Hundred Railway, a subsidiary of the Great Eastern Railway, in 1866. It is currently managed by Greater Anglia, which also operates all trains serving the station.

== History ==
The station was opened with the name Thorpe by the Tendring Hundred Railway, a subsidiary of the Great Eastern Railway, on 28 July 1866 on the Tendring Hundred Extension Railway line. It was renamed Thorpe-le-Soken on 1 March 1900.

It has two platforms forming an island platform that is accessible via a footbridge. There is a clearly visible platform and trackbed on what would be platform 3; this is continuous with the other stations on the Walton branch. One of the double tracks that were originally on the line to Walton has been completely taken up. These tracks and platforms were used until 1982 when trains from London were split at Thorpe le Soken station and 4 cars would go to Walton and 4 to Clacton. Both platforms are usable from all lines.

== Services ==
The typical off-peak services pattern is:

Operator	Route	Rolling stock	Frequency
Greater Anglia	London Liverpool Street - Stratford - Shenfield - Ingatestone - Chelmsford - Witham - Colchester - Wivenhoe - Thorpe-le-Soken - Clacton-on-Sea	Class 720	1x per hour
Greater Anglia	Colchester - Colchester Town - Hythe - Wivenhoe - Alresford - Great Bentley - Weeley - Thorpe-le-Soken - Kirby Cross - Frinton-on-Sea - Walton-on-the-Naze	Class 720	1x per hour

During peak hours there are some additional services to and from Liverpool Street.

Preceding station	National Rail	Following station
Weeley	Greater Anglia Sunshine Coast Line; Clacton branch	Clacton-on-Sea
Weeley	Greater Anglia Sunshine Coast Line; Walton branch	Kirby Cross
