= Brightlingsea railway station =

Disused railway station in England

Coordinates: 51.8094°N 1.0205°E

Brightlingsea
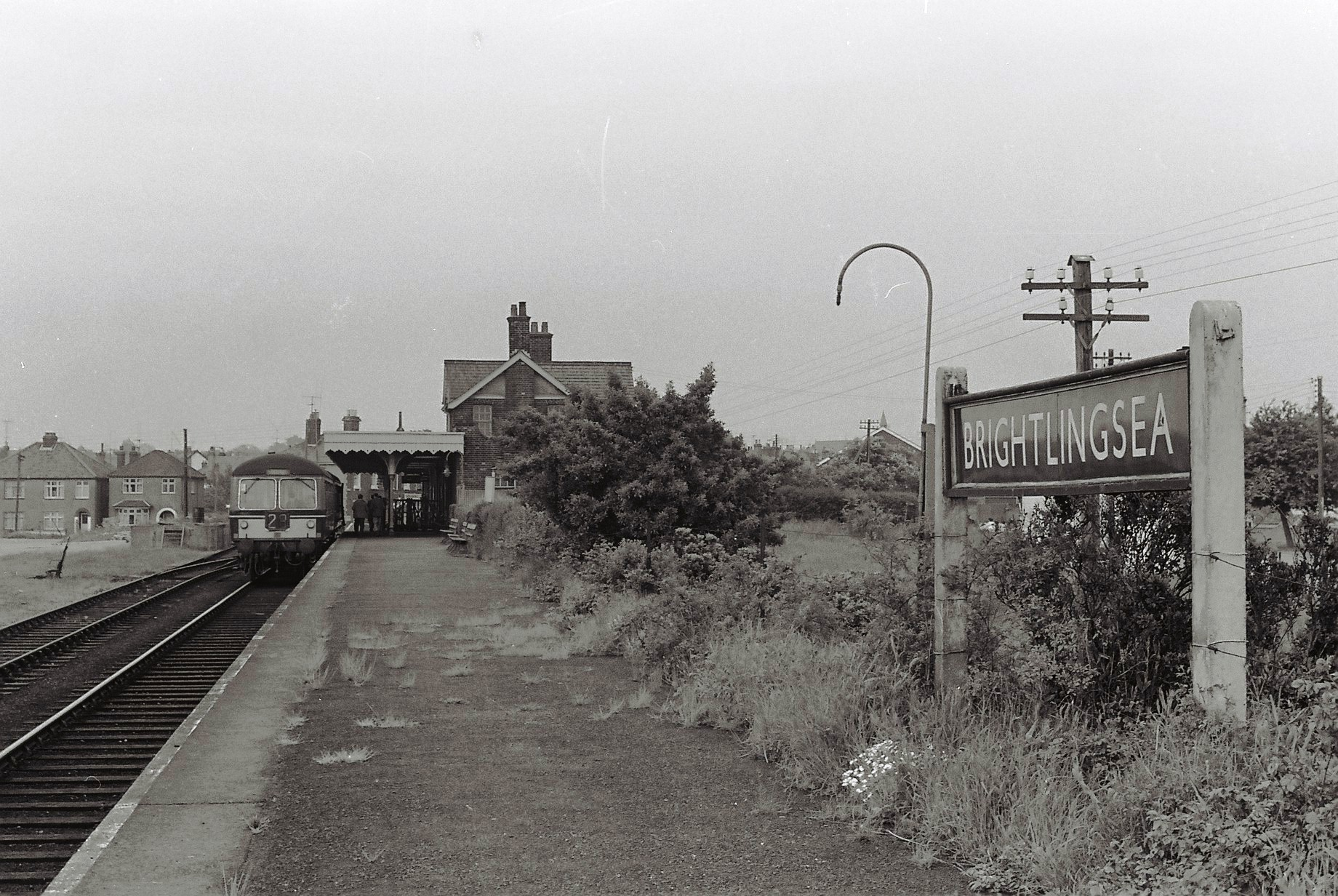

General information
- Location: Brightlingsea, Tendring; England
- Platforms: 1

Other information
- Status: Disused

History
- Original company: Tendring Hundred Railway
- Pre-grouping: Great Eastern Railway
- Post-grouping: London and North Eastern Railway

Key dates
- 18 April 1866: Opened
- 1 February 1953: Closed
- 7 December 1953: Reopened
- 15 June 1964: Closed
Location

Brightlingsea railway station was located in Brightlingsea, Essex. It was on the single track branch line of the Wivenhoe and Brightlingsea Railway which opened in 1866 and closed in 1964.

== History ==
The station building was located on the southern side of Lower Park Road where the town's community centre now sits.

Wivenhoe and Brightlingsea Railway Act 1861
- Act of Parliament
- Parliament of the United Kingdom
- Long title: An Act for making and maintaining a Railway from Wivenhoe to Brightlingsea, both in the County of Essex, and for other Purposes.
- Citation: 24 & 25 Vict. c. cxix

Dates
- Royal assent: 11 July 1861

The station and line was built by the Wivenhoe and Brightlingsea Railway Company. This was incorporated by the Wivenhoe and Brightlingsea Railway Act 1861 (24 & 25 Vict. c. cxix) to build a line from Wivenhoe to Brightlingsea which opened on 18 April 1866. The company was a separate, but associated, company to the Tendring Hundred Railway which had built the line from Colchester to Wivenhoe. The GER soon negotiated to buy both the Tendring Hundred Railway and the Clacton-on-Sea Railway, and they became part of the GER on 1 July 1883. The Wivenhoe and Brightlingsea Railway was absorbed by the GER on 9 June 1893 under the Great Eastern Railway (General Powers) Act 1893 (56 & 57 Vict. c. lii).

The station was host to a camping coach from 1936 to 1939.

The line was temporarily closed on 1 February 1953 following severe flood damage but was not reopened until 7 December that year.

== Closure ==
The service was identified for closure the Beeching Report of 1963 and was eventually axed in 1964. This was supposedly prompted by the high costs of maintaining the railway swing bridge over Alresford Creek, which was necessary to allow boat traffic to the many sand and gravel pits in the area.

The station building stayed in place for four years after the railway's closure until it was damaged by fire in 1968. The building was finally demolished in November 1969.

== Remains of railway ==
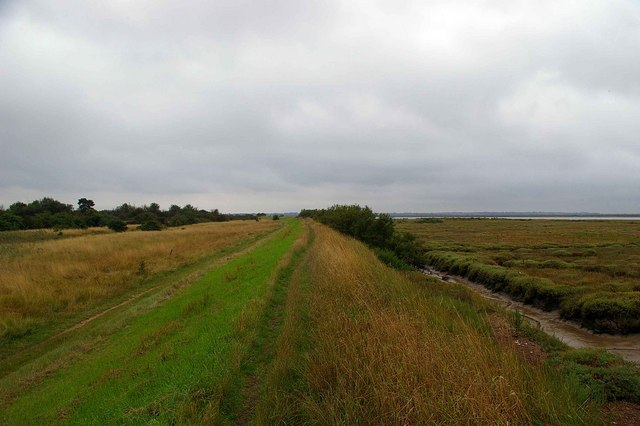
The former railway embankment looking towards Brightlingsea

The visible relics of the railway's presence today are the Railway public house and micro-brewery, and the old embankment which is now a footpath. It is possible to walk along virtually the whole length of the former route from very near the site of the old station in Brightlingsea along the old embankment to the site of the former swing bridge. This makes for a pleasant, scenic walk alongside the River Colne with its ecologically interesting salt-marsh environment.

The nearest railway station is now at Alresford.

Preceding station	Disused railways	Following station
Wivenhoe; Line closed, station open	Great Eastern Railway; Tendring Hundred Railway	Terminus
