= Thorington railway station =

Former railway station in England

Thorington

General information
- Location: Thorrington, Tendring, Essex; England
- Coordinates: 51.8495°N 1.0367°E
- Grid reference: TM092211
- Platforms: 2

Other information
- Status: Disused

History
- Original company: Tendring Hundred Extension Railway
- Pre-grouping: Great Eastern Railway
- Post-grouping: London and North Eastern Railway

Key dates
- 8 January 1866: opened
- 4 November 1957: closed
Location

Thorington railway station (also Thorrington railway station) was a station in Thorrington, Essex on the line (now called the Sunshine Coast Line) from Colchester to Walton on the Naze and Clacton, opened in 1866 and closed in 1957. The station was situated in between Alresford and Great Bentley. It was closed due to its close proximity to the much busier station at Great Bentley, just half a mile down the track.

== History ==
In 1859, the Tendring Hundred Railway Company was formed to extend the line from Hythe to Wivenhoe which opened on 8 May 1863, for both passenger and goods services from Colchester. By the time the Wivenhoe extension opened the line was operated by the GER Great Eastern Railway who bought the line from the Tendring Hundred Railway in 1883.

Thorington station was opened as part of the Tendring Hundred Extension Railway on 8 January 1866.

Initially the station was served by a single track but the line was doubled between Great Bentley and Thorpe-le-Soken by the Great Eastern Railway in 1891. The Wivenhoe to Great Bentley section was doubled in 1898.

The confusion as to the spelling of the name appears long-established; although Victorian Ordnance Survey maps show 'Thorrington Station' – and this has remained the official spelling ever since as far as local authorities are concerned – Bradshaw's timetables list 'Thorington', as did the BR Eastern Region timetable up until the station's closure. Indeed, the main signs on the station platforms read 'Thorington'.

Operation of the station passed to the London and North Eastern Railway in 1923.

In 1948, the station became part of the Eastern Region of British Railways.

The 1955 modernisation plan proposed the electrification of the line through Thorington but unfortunately the station closed on 4 November 1957, and was the only station on the Colchester to Clacton Line to close.

In 2002, there was an unsuccessful campaign to re-open the station.

== Route ==
Preceding station	Historical railways	Following station
Alresford; Line and station open	Great Eastern Railway; Tendring Hundred Extension Railway	Great Bentley; Line and station open
