= Church of St Leonard at the Hythe, Colchester =

Coordinates: 51.8847°N 0.9232°E

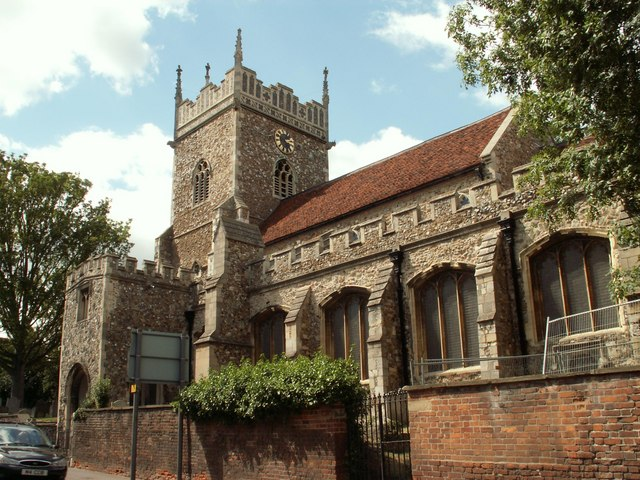
- Church of St Leonard at the Hythe, Colchester, from the southeast

- Location in Essex
- OS grid reference: TM 013 247
- Location: Colchester, Essex
- Country: England
- Denomination: Anglican
- Website: Friends of St Leonard at the Hythe

History
- Dedication: Saint Leonard

Architecture
- Functional status: Redundant
- Heritage designation: Grade II*
- Designated: 24 February 1950
- Architectural type: Church
- Style: Gothic
- Closed: 1982

The Church of St Leonard at the Hythe is a redundant Anglican church in Hythe, Colchester, Essex, England. It is recorded in the National Heritage List for England as a designated Grade II* listed building, and is under the care of the Churches Conservation Trust. The church stands on the north side of Hythe Hill, in the Hythe area of Colchester.

For many years St Leonard's served as the church of the port of Colchester. Its earliest fabric dates from the 14th century. Additions and alterations were made in the following century, and the hammerbeam roof of the nave dates from the early 16th century. During the Siege of Colchester in the Civil War, Royalist soldiers took refuge in the church. Bullet holes from this incident survive in the door. In the earthquake of 1884 the tower was damaged and its top stage was replaced.

The screens and furnishings date from the 19th and 20th centuries. Over the chancel arch is a mural dated 1901. Stained glass windows depict various saints. Over the centuries the church has required repeated restoration due to subsidence, or to inadequacies in the earlier construction.

== See also ==
- List of churches preserved by the Churches Conservation Trust in the East of England
