= Thorrington =

Village in Essex, England

Coordinates: 51.83835°N 1.04104°E

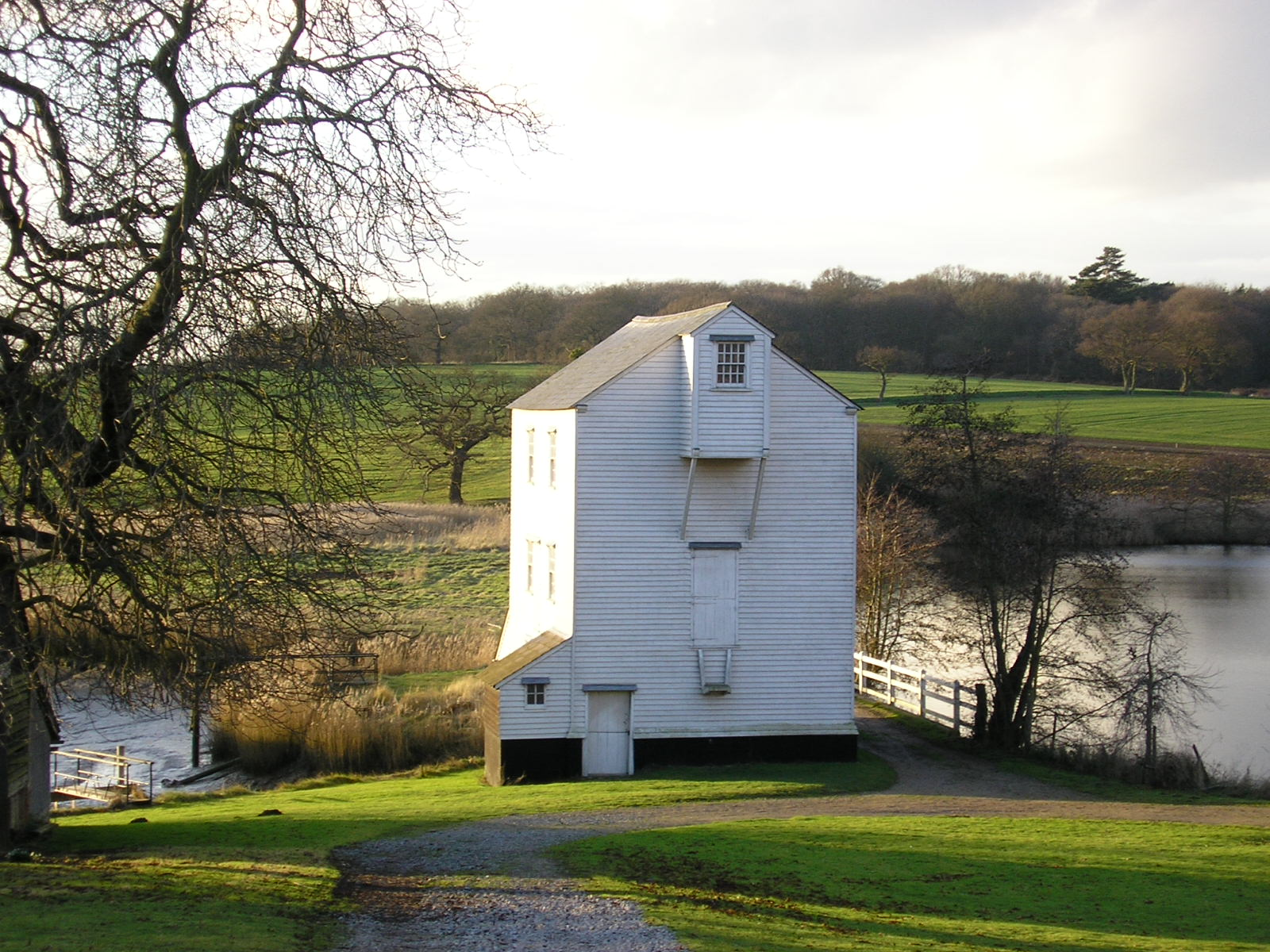

- Location within Essex
- Population: 1,429 (Parish, 2021)
- Civil parish: Thorrington
- District: Tendring
- Shire county: Essex
- Region: East
- Country: England
- Sovereign state: United Kingdom
- Post town: Colchester
- Postcode district: CO7
- Dialling code: 01206
- Police: Essex
- Fire: Essex
- Ambulance: East of England

Thorrington is a village and civil parish in the Tendring district of Essex, England. It lies 3 miles (5 km) east of Wivenhoe and 1.9 miles (3 km) north of Brightlingsea. The striking medieval flint church is dedicated to Mary Magdalene, and the patrons of the church are St John's College, Cambridge.At the 2021 census the parish had a population of 1,429.

Thorrington is mentioned in the Domesday Book of 1086 as Torinduna. From handwritten sources held by the Church, Thorrington has also been known as Turituna (1152–71); Torritona (1202), Thurituna (1237), Thurington (1248), Thurinton (1253). Thorinton (1255), Tornidune (1272), Tyriton (1274), Thornton (1285), Thoriton (1295), Thoweryngton (1476), Thurrington (1594).

== Geography ==
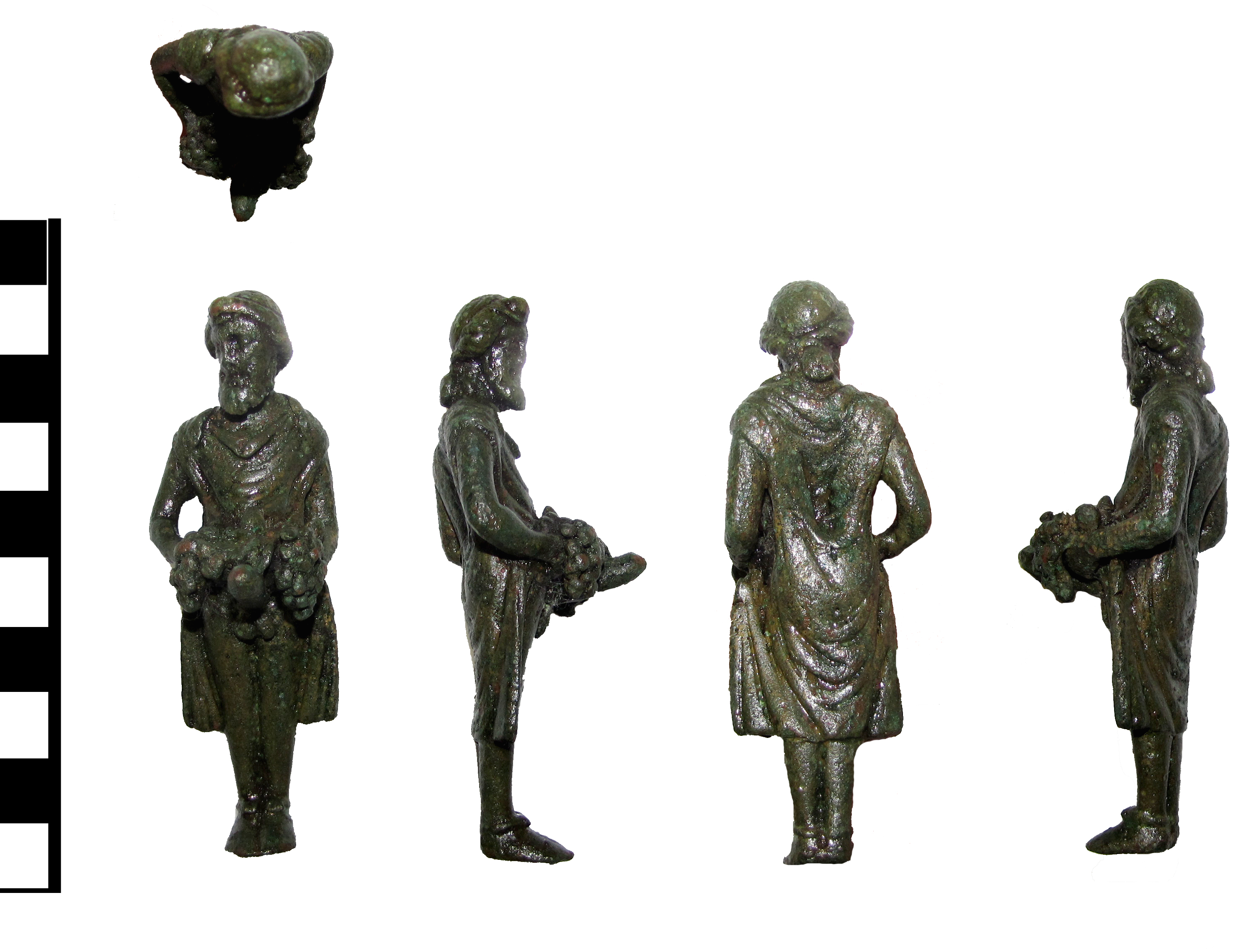
A Roman copper-alloy figurine of the fertility god, Priapus, found in Thorrington in 2010 and dated to c. 40 – c. 410

On the west side, the Tenpenny Brook forms the parish boundary between Thorrington and Alresford. At the point where the brook flows into the Alresford Creek (a branch of the Colne Estuary) stands Thorrington Mill. This is a tide mill built in 1831 and now a Grade II* listed building. The east and northern boundaries of the parish are bounded by the Saltwater Brook. Where the Saltwater Brook flows into Flag Creek (formerly Borefleet Creek or Byrflytt) is the former site of another Tidal Mill.

The village is now almost connected by recently built (2000s) housing to Thorrington Cross, a hamlet of mixed industrial & retail premises, smallholdings and inter-war ribbon development villas at the crossroads of the B1029 (the Brightlingsea road) and the B1027 (Wivenhoe to Clacton).

The Colchester to Clacton railway line passes just to the north of the village. Thorrington's station – spelled 'Thorrington' on the Ordnance Survey map, but 'Thorington' as far as the railway companies were concerned – was opened in 1867, and closed in 1957. Great Bentley station is now the closest rail station, located around 2 miles north-east of the village.

== Local schools ==
Great Bentley Primary School is the nearest primary school which serves the catchments of Thorrington, Great Bentley, Frating, Little Bentley and Aingers Green, which caters for around 210 boys and girls aged 4–11. This school was built in 1896 and has recently undertaken some rebuilding work in 2003, maintaining its historic front throughout. Currently, this school is rated good or two in its latest Ofsted inspection report.

== Governance ==
There are several elected representatives at different levels of government which act for Thorrington and the surrounding villages. There are two Thorrington, Frating, Elmstead and Great Bromley district councillors who represent the area at Tendring District Council. The population of the above ward was at the 2011 census 4,687. The current district councillors are Gary Scott (LibDem) and Ann Wiggins (LibDem).

The current Brightlingsea County Councillor who represents the area at Essex County Council is Alan Goggin (Conservative).

The current Harwich and North Essex MP who represents the area in the House of Commons is the Rt Hon Sir Bernard Jenkin (Conservative).

== Related places ==
Thorrington was the name of the home of an estate agent, Charles Clark (1824–1906), who arrived in Christchurch, New Zealand, from England in 1856. Built in 1860, it was a large house with extensive gardens, on the banks of the Heathcote River, and the venue for many garden parties. Clark was living at this house at the time of his marriage in 1865, and died there in 1906. It led to the naming of Thorrington Road in the area, and Thorrington School, a primary school on Colombo Street. Originally an estate of 52 acres, Thorrington was subdivided in 1904 and again in 1934, leaving about six acres. The house was demolished and the land further subdivided in the late 1930s.

== See also ==
- Wikipedia:WikiProject East Anglia/Task forces/Essex
