= The Hythe, Essex =

Area in Colchester, Essex, England

Coordinates: 51.8827°N 0.9262°E

The Hythe
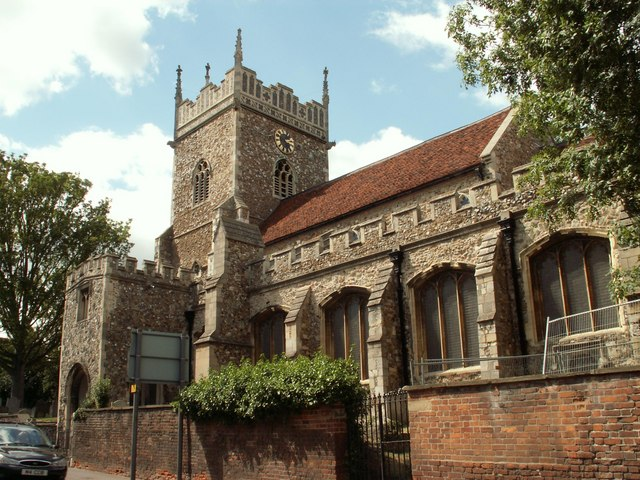
- St Leonard's Church at the Hythe

- Location within Essex
- District: Colchester
- Shire county: Essex
- Region: East
- Country: England
- Sovereign state: United Kingdom
- Post town: COLCHESTER
- Postcode district: CO1
- Dialling code: 01206
- Police: Essex
- Fire: Essex
- Ambulance: East of England

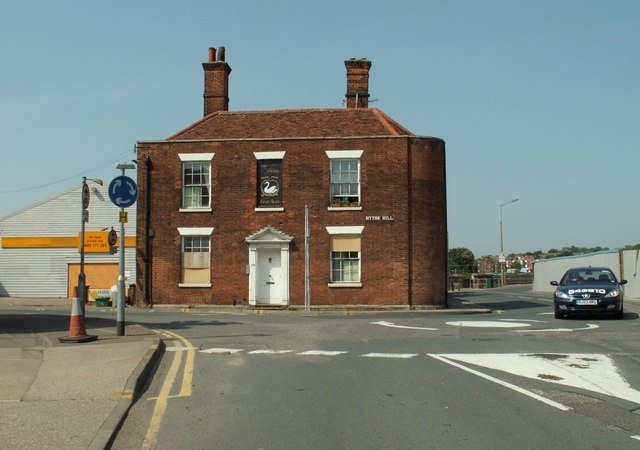
'The Swan' public house in the Hythe.

The Hythe is an area in the southeastern part of Colchester in Essex, England, on the River Colne. Historically it was a hamlet. The Hythe was home to the Paxmans Factory which manufactured automobile parts.

Hythe railway station is on the Sunshine Coast Line. Services run towards Clacton-on-sea, Walton-on-the-Naze, Colchester and London.

The Church of St Leonard is located in the Hythe.
