= Walton-on-the-Naze railway station =

Railway station in Essex, England

Walton-on-the-Naze
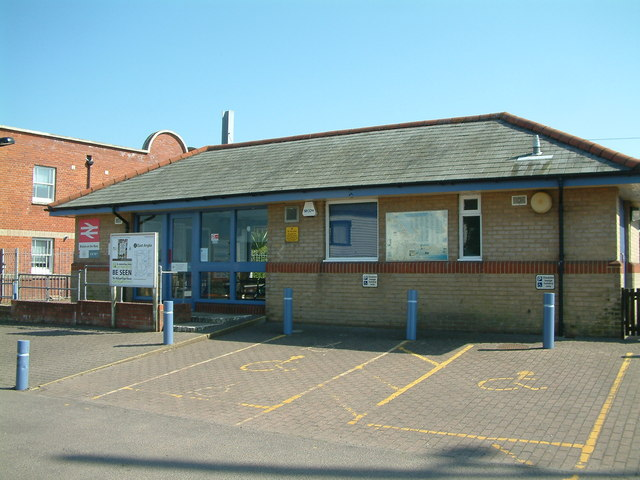

General information
- Location: Walton-on-the-Naze, Tendring; England
- Coordinates: 51.846°N 1.268°E
- Grid reference: TM251214
- Manager: Greater Anglia
- Platforms: 1

Other information
- Station code: WON
- Classification: DfT category E

History
- Opened: 17 May 1867
- Original company: Tendring Hundred Railway
- Pre-grouping: Great Eastern Railway
- Post-grouping: London and North Eastern Railway

Passengers
- 2020/21: ▼40,024
- 2021/22: ▲97,784
- 2022/23: ▲0.111 million
- 2023/24: ▲0.126 million
- 2024/25: ▲0.141 million
Location
Notes
- Passenger statistics from the Office of Rail and Road

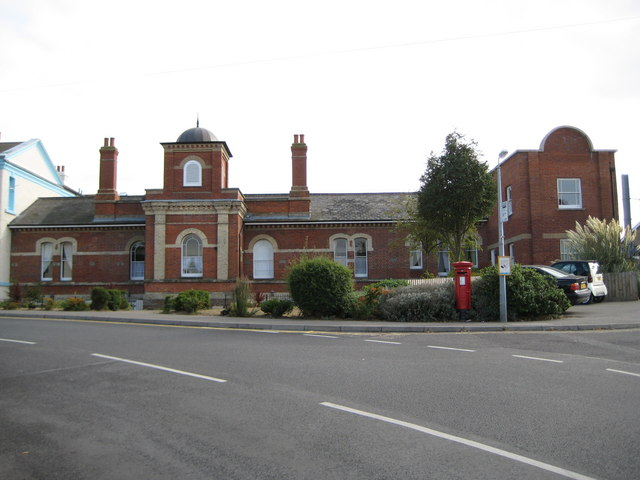
The original station building, which is adjacent to the current station, has been converted into residential accommodation (2009)

Walton-on-the-Naze railway station is one of the two eastern termini of the Sunshine Coast Line, a branch of the Great Eastern Main Line, in the East of England. It serves the seaside town of Walton-on-the-Naze, Essex. It is 70 miles 15 chains (113.0 km) down the line from London Liverpool Street. Its three-letter station code is WON. The preceding station on the line is Frinton-on-Sea.

The station was opened by the Tendring Hundred Railway, a subsidiary of the Great Eastern Railway, in 1867. It is currently managed by Greater Anglia, which also operates all trains serving the station.

== History ==
The station was opened as Walton-on-Naze on 17 May 1867 by the Tendring Hundred Railway, then worked by the Great Eastern Railway (GER). The GER acquired the Tendring Hundred Railway and the adjacent Clacton-on-Sea Railway on 1 July 1883. The Wivenhoe & Brightlingsea line was also absorbed by the GER on 9 June 1893. The line later became part of the London and North Eastern Railway (LNER) in 1923 and then part of the Eastern Region of British Railways, following nationalisation in 1948.

The station is the terminus of the short single-track branch off the Sunshine Coast Line at Thorpe-le-Soken; only what was the "down" (coast-bound) platform remains in use, following the electrification of the line. There was a small locomotive shed at the station and, on 1 January 1922, this had an allocation of two GER Class Y65 2-4-2T engines. The shed was later converted into a coach-park.

In 1929, the LNER introduced luxurious Pullman day excursion trips from Liverpool Street to various seaside resorts. The service, known as the Eastern Belle, served Felixstowe on Mondays, Frinton and Walton on Tuesdays, Clacton on Wednesdays, and Thorpeness and Aldeburgh on Thursdays and Fridays. The service ended in September 1939, due to the outbreak of World War II.

In 1982, the practice of splitting Liverpool Street - Clacton trains at Thorpe le Soken was ended.

The station was renamed Walton-on-the-Naze on 20 May 2007 to reflect properly the name of the town that it serves.

== Accidents and incidents ==
On 12 August 1987 a passenger train over-ran the buffer stops at Walton-on-the-Naze and became embedded in the station building. Six people and the train's driver were injured in the incident. The 1:05 pm service from Thorpe-le-Soken, formed of a single Class 313 unit, was severely damaged and an investigation blamed failure of its brakes as the primary cause of the accident. The driver was also deemed to have been at fault for not applying the emergency brake in addition to the normal brakes.

On 26 August 2002 a railtour charter train, hauled by a pair of Class 58 diesel locomotives, collided with the buffers at low speed at Walton-on-the-Naze. As passengers were standing ready to leave the train, 29 passengers suffered minor injures, alongside a further two sustaining broken bones. The railtour's name, The Bone Breaker; a wordplay for the Class 58s being nicknamed "Bones" and their intended fate of going to the "Breaker"; became unintentionally synonymous with the collision.

== Services ==
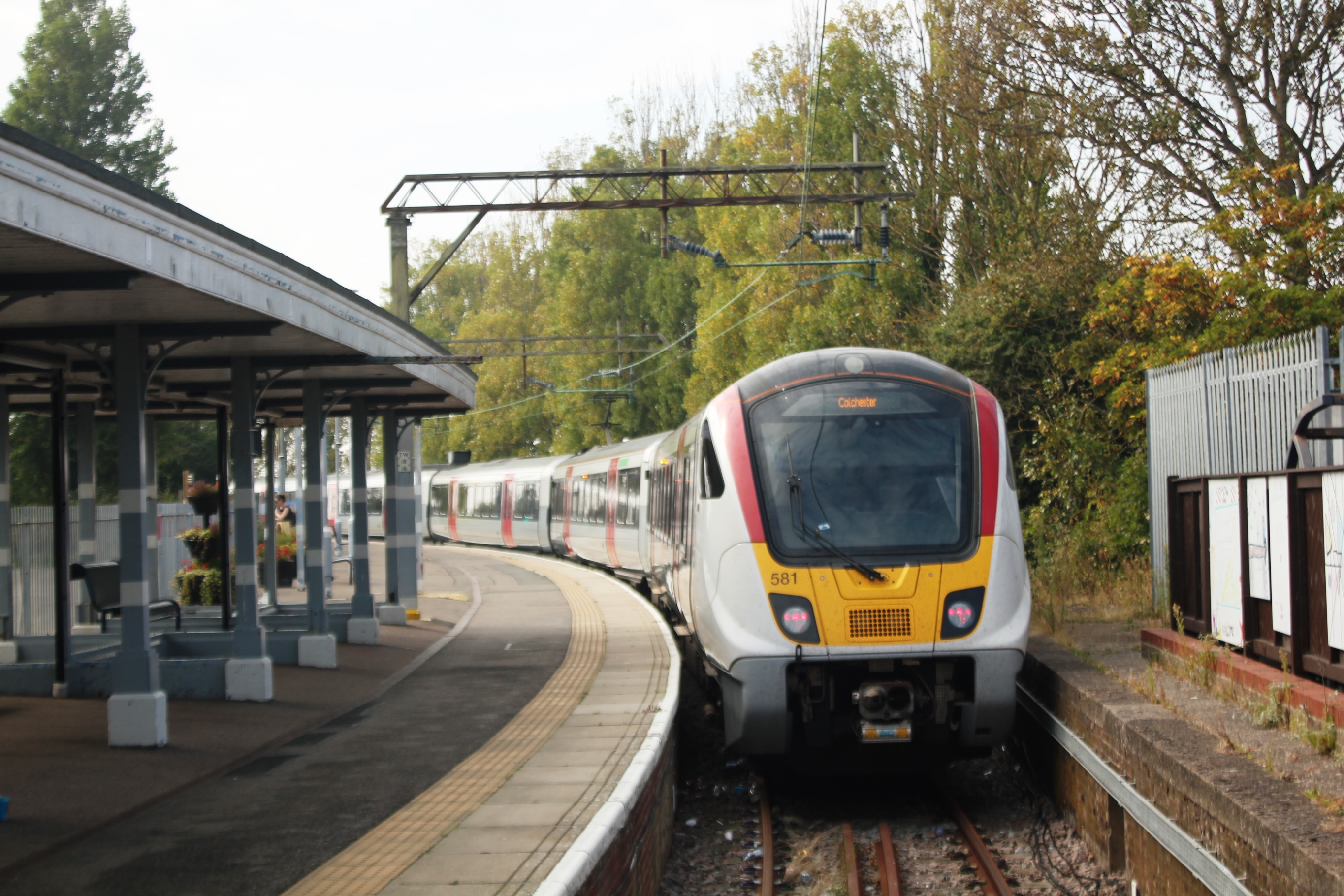
A Class 720 at Walton-on-the-Naze with a Colchester service (2024)

The typical current service pattern is:

Operator	Route	Rolling stock	Frequency	Notes
Greater Anglia	Colchester - Colchester Town - Hythe - Wivenhoe - Alresford - Great Bentley - Weeley - Thorpe-le-Soken - Kirby Cross - Frinton-on-Sea - Walton-on-the-Naze	Class 720	1x per hour	Monday-Saturday
Greater Anglia	Thorpe-le-Soken - Kirby Cross - Frinton-on-Sea - Walton-on-the-Naze	Class 720	1x per hour	Sunday

Passengers for Clacton-on-Sea must change at Thorpe-le-Soken for a connecting service, except for the first train coming from Clacton-on-Sea or the last train back on Monday to Saturday.

Preceding station	National Rail	Following station
Frinton-on-Sea	Greater Anglia Sunshine Coast Line; Walton branch	Terminus
