= Colchester Town railway station =

Railway station in Essex, England

Colchester Town
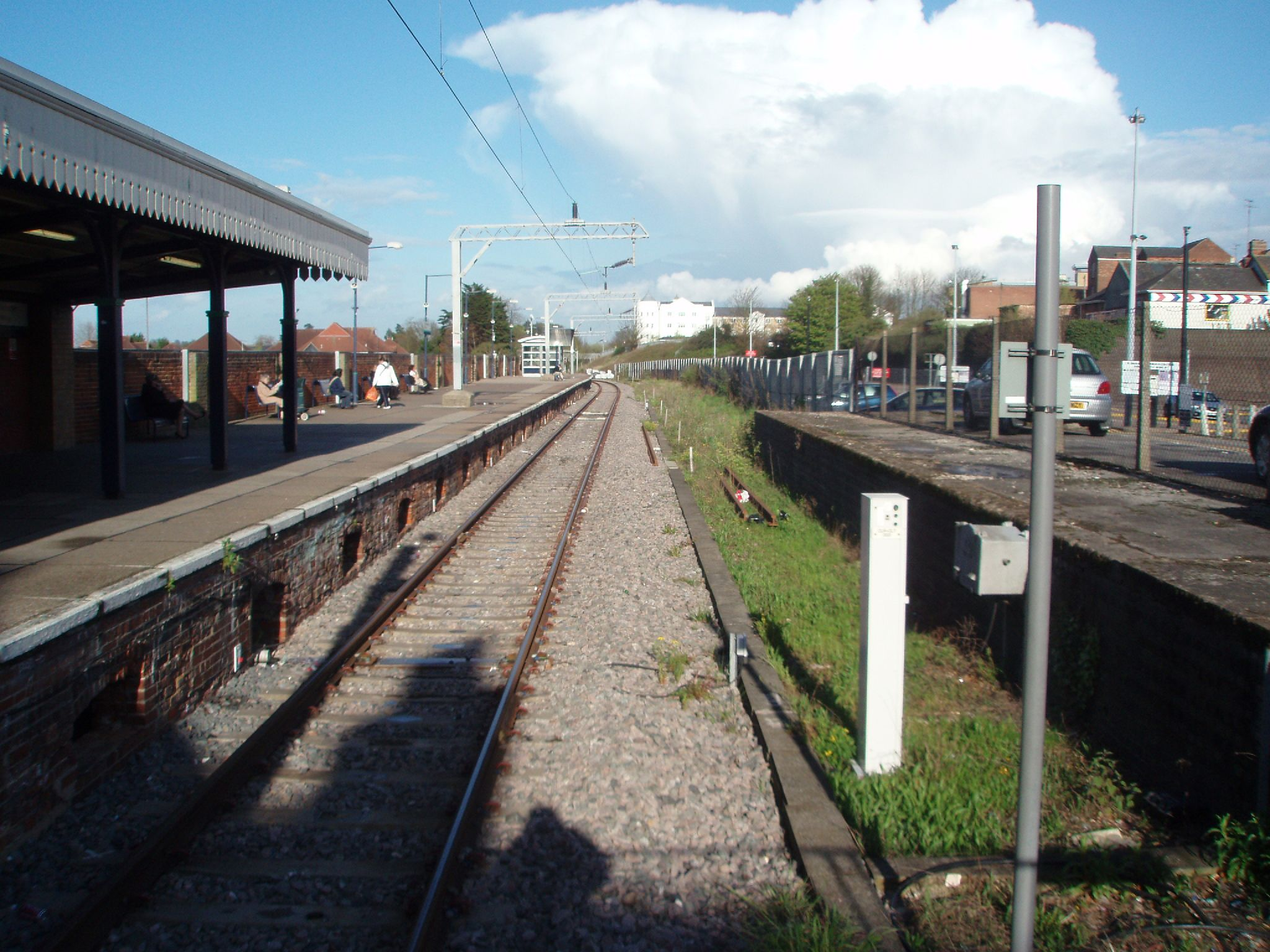

General information
- Location: Colchester, City of Colchester; England
- Coordinates: 51°53′11″N 0°54′16″E
- Grid reference: TM000248
- Manager: Greater Anglia
- Platforms: 1

Other information
- Station code: CET
- Classification: DfT category E

History
- Original company: Tendring Hundred Railway
- Pre-grouping: Great Eastern Railway
- Post-grouping: London and North Eastern Railway

Key dates
- 1 March 1866: Opened as St. Botolph's
- 8 July 1991: Renamed Colchester Town

Passengers
- 2020/21: ▼0.178 million
- 2021/22: ▲0.504 million
- 2022/23: ▲0.587 million
- 2023/24: ▲0.644 million
- 2024/25: ▲1.012 million
Location
Notes
- Passenger statistics from the Office of Rail and Road

Colchester Town railway station (formerly St Botolph's) is on the Sunshine Coast Line in the East of England, and is the secondary station serving the city of Colchester, Essex. It is 53 miles 76 chains (86.8 km) from London Liverpool Street. Its three-letter station code is CET. The city's larger station is called Colchester (commonly referred to as Colchester North to distinguish it from Colchester Town) and is on the Great Eastern Main Line but is further away from the city centre.

The station was opened in 1866 by the Tendring Hundred Railway, a subsidiary of the Great Eastern Railway, as St. Botolph's. The name derived from nearby St Botolph's Priory, which – along with the neighbouring church – gave its name to that area of the town. The station connected the town centre to the mainline station at Colchester North, and to the port at Hythe station.

The station's goods yards were closed in 1982. It was renamed Colchester Town in 1991. Following Colchester being granted city status in 2022, the High Steward, Sir Bob Russell, requested that the station be renamed Colchester City; however, this was rejected by Greater Anglia on cost grounds.

As of 2026, the station is operated Greater Anglia, which also runs all trains serving the station. There is only one station. Since a magistrates' court was built the station size has decreased, losing its car park and talks of adding an extra platform have been halted. To the east of the station, Colne Junction is the western extremity of a triangle which gives access towards Colchester station to the west and Hythe station to the east. The curve to the north from Colne Junction to East Gates Junction is sharp, with a continuous check rail which necessitates slow passage.

== Services ==
The following services typically call at Colchester Town during the off-peak:

- 3 trains per hour (tph) to Colchester, of which;
- 1 tph to London Liverpool Street, calling at all stations to Witham then Chelmsford, Shenfield, and Stratford;
- 1 tph to Walton-on-the-Naze, calling at all intermediate stations.

Colchester Town is closed on Sundays unless engineering work closes Colchester station, in which case Colchester Town is used as an alternative station.

| Operator | Route | Rolling stock | Frequency | Notes |
|---|---|---|---|---|
| Greater Anglia | London Liverpool Street - Stratford - Shenfield - Chelmsford - Beaulieu Park - Witham - Kelvedon - Marks Tey - Colchester - Colchester Town | Class 720 | 1x per hour each direction | Monday-Saturday only |
| Greater Anglia | Colchester - Colchester Town - Hythe - Wivenhoe - Alresford - Great Bentley - Weeley - Thorpe-le-Soken - Kirby Cross - Frinton-on-Sea - Walton-on-the-Naze | Class 720 | 1x per hour each direction | Monday-Saturday only |
| Greater Anglia | Colchester - Colchester Town | Class 720 | 1x per hour each direction | Monday-Saturday only |

| Preceding station | National Rail | Following station |
|---|---|---|
| Colchester | Greater Anglia; Sunshine Coast Line | Hythe |
