= Sunshine Coast Line =

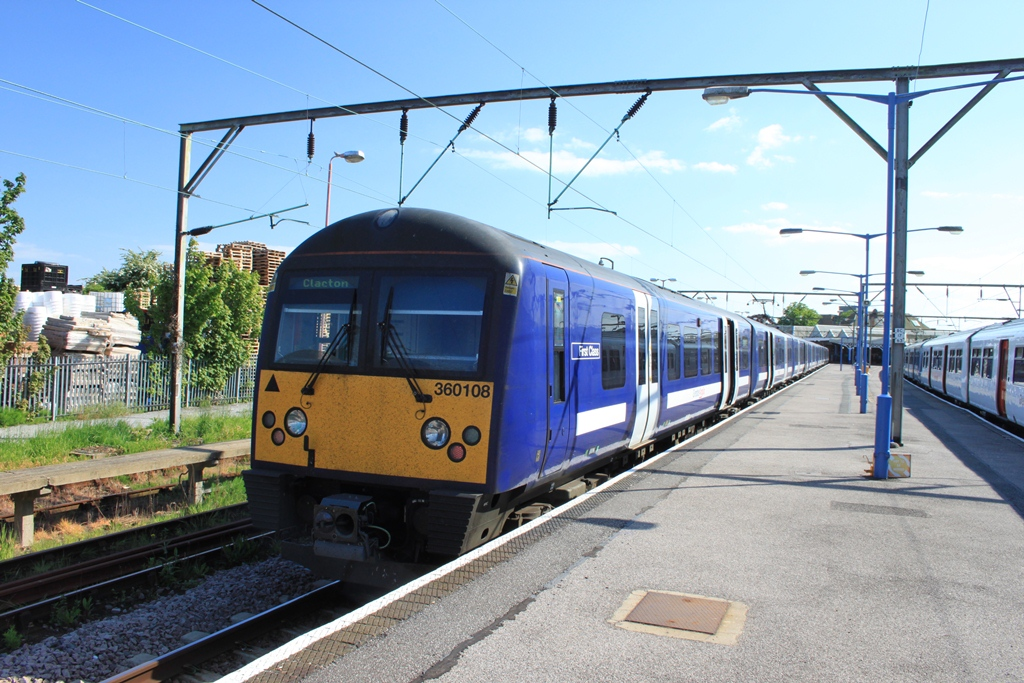
- A Greater Anglia Class 360 departs Clacton-on-Sea in June 2013

Overview
- Status: Operational
- Owner: Network Rail
- Locale: East of England
- Termini: Colchester; Clacton-on-Sea Walton-on-the-Naze
- Stations: 12

Service
- Type: Commuter rail
- System: National Rail
- Operator: Greater Anglia
- Depot(s): Colchester; Clacton-on-Sea
- Rolling stock: Class 720

Technical
- Line length: 18 miles 4 chains (29.05 km) to Clacton-on-Sea; 18 miles 43 chains (29.83 km) to Walton-on-the-Naze
- Track gauge: 1,435 mm (4 ft 8 1/2 in) standard gauge
- Electrification: 25 kV 50 Hz AC OHLE
Route map
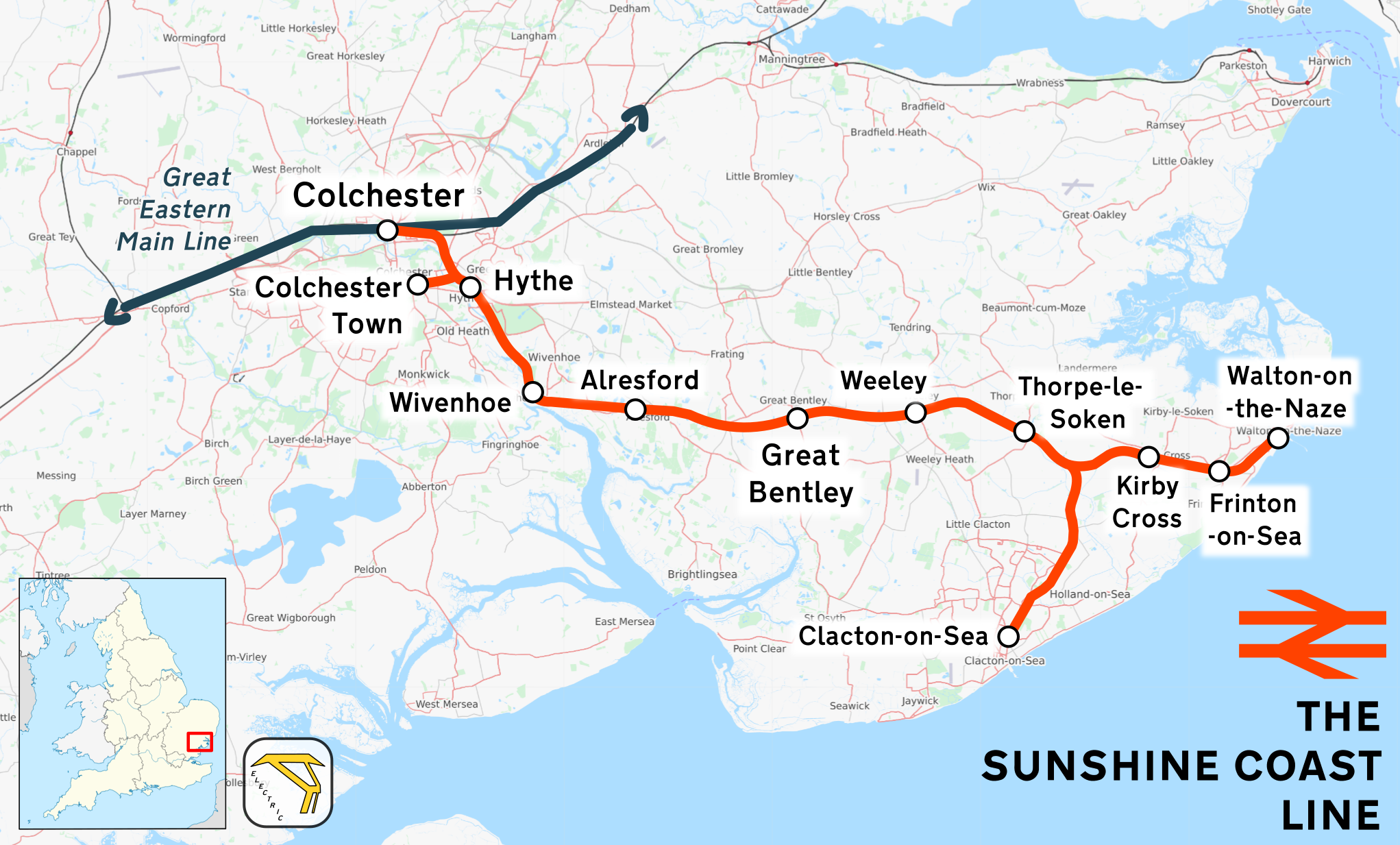
(Click to expand)

The Sunshine Coast Line is the current marketing name of what originally was the Tendring Hundred Railway, a branch off the Great Eastern Main Line in the East of England. It links Colchester to the seaside resorts of Clacton-on-Sea and, via a branch, Walton-on-the-Naze. The line is part of the Network Rail Strategic Route 7, SRS 07.08, and is classified as a London & South East commuter line. Passenger services on the line are currently operated by Greater Anglia.

Trains for Clacton-on-Sea usually originate at London Liverpool Street, while those for Walton-on-the-Naze typically start at Colchester (or Thorpe-le-Soken on Sundays). There are, however, limited morning and evening peak-time services in each direction between Walton-on-the-Naze and Liverpool Street.

== History ==
=== Steam era ===
The Great Eastern Main Line out of Shoreditch in London reached Colchester by 1843 and was extended to Ipswich in 1846.

Tendring Hundred Railway Act 1859
- Act of Parliament
- Parliament of the United Kingdom
- Long title: An Act to authorize the Construction of a Railway from the Hythe in the Neighbourhood of Colchester to Wivenhoe in Essex, to be called "The Tendring Hundred Railway."
- Citation: 22 & 23 Vict. c. cxix

Dates
- Royal assent: 13 August 1859

Tendring Hundred Railway Act 1867
- Act of Parliament
- Parliament of the United Kingdom
- Long title: An Act to grant further Powers to the Tendring Hundred Railway Company.
- Citation: 30 & 31 Vict. c. xliii

Dates
- Royal assent: 31 May 1867

Text of statute as originally enacted

The first short section of this branch line was built by the Colchester, Stour Valley, Sudbury and Halstead Railway to the port of Hythe, and opened for freight traffic on 31 March 1847. In 1859 the Tendring Hundred Railway Company was formed by the Tendring Hundred Railway Act 1859 (22 & 23 Vict. c. cxix) to extend the line from Hythe to Wivenhoe, which opened on 8 May 1863 for both passenger and goods services from Colchester. By the time the Wivenhoe extension opened the line had been taken over by the Great Eastern Railway (GER) who provided the rolling-stock in return for 50% of takings.

The route was extended to Weeley on 8 January 1866, to Kirby Cross on 28 July 1866, and on to the terminus at Walton-on-Naze on 17 May 1867. In the meantime, a short branch to a new station called St. Botolph's, located more centrally in Colchester, opened on 1 March 1866. This station was renamed Colchester Town on 8 July 1991 by British Rail.

Clacton-on-Sea Railway Act 1877
- Act of Parliament
- Parliament of the United Kingdom
- Long title: An Act for making a Railway from Clacton-on-Sea to the Tendring Hundred Railway, in the County of Essex; and for other purposes.
- Citation: 40 & 41 Vict. c. clxvi

Dates
- Royal assent: 2 August 1877

Text of statute as originally enacted

A second company, the Wivenhoe and Brightlingsea Railway, had been incorporated in 1861 to build a line from Wivenhoe to Brightlingsea, which opened on 17 April 1866. There were also proposals to build a line to Clacton as early as 1866, but nothing came of them until 1877, when the Clacton-on-Sea Railway was incorporated by the Clacton-on-Sea Railway Act 1877 (40 & 41 Vict. c. clxvi). The connection from Thorpe-le-Soken to Clacton opened on 4 July 1882, also operated by the GER.

Great Eastern, Tendring Hundred and Clacton-on-Sea Railways Act 1883
- Act of Parliament
- Parliament of the United Kingdom
- Long title: An Act for the sale and transfer to the Great Eastern Railway Company of the Undertakings of the Tendring Hundred Railway Company and of the Clacton-on-Sea Railway Company; and for other purposes.
- Citation: 46 & 47 Vict. c. lvi

Dates
- Royal assent: 29 June 1883

The GER negotiated to buy both the Tendring Hundred Railway and the Clacton-on-Sea Railway, and they became part of the GER on 1 July 1883 by the Great Eastern, Tendring Hundred and Clacton-on-Sea Railways Act 1883 (46 & 47 Vict. c. lvi). The Wivenhoe and Brightlingsea Railway Company was absorbed by the GER on 9 June 1893.

In 1923 the line (along with the rest of the GER) became part of the London and North Eastern Railway.

A section of the line between Frinton and Walton-on-Naze had to be re-sited in 1929 due to fears of coastal erosion on the original alignment.

Following nationalisation on 1 January 1948, the line became part of the Eastern Region of British Railways.

=== Electrification ===
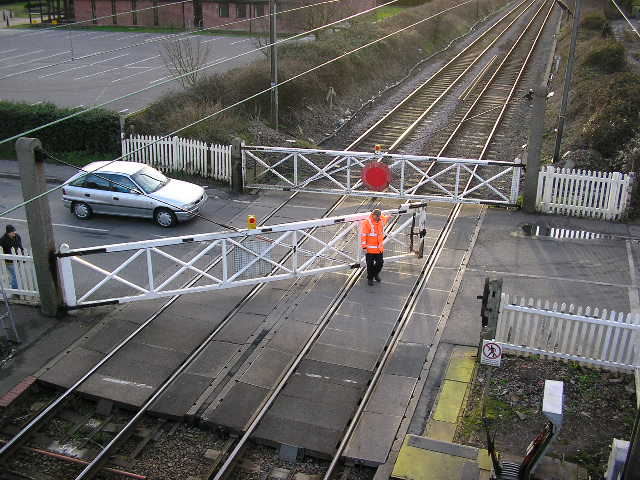
Manually-operated level crossing at Great Bentley, which was replaced with barriers in 2008

Electrification of the line commenced in the 1950s and by January 1959 the line was electrified as far as Great Bentley. The first trial train to run on the newly electrified section departed Colchester on 18 January 1959. The line was the first in the country to be electrified at 25 kV AC, using overhead wires, with electrified services inaugurated on 13 April 1959. Between 1962 and 1992, services on the line were largely operated by a fleet of Class 309 electric multiple units which were specially designed and constructed for the route. The 309s were replaced on the route by newer rolling stock between 1992 and 1994 during the Network SouthEast era.

Passenger services have been operated by two different franchises since privatisation of British Rail in 1997: First Great Eastern until 31 March 2004, when National Express took over with the company branded as One until February 2008, at which time it was rebranded as National Express East Anglia. It is currently operated by Abellio Greater Anglia.

=== Recent developments ===
A £104 million engineering project known as the Colchester to Clacton Resignalling Project took place on the line between December 2006 and July 2009. Life-expired signalling equipment was renewed and a new control system was fitted; 170 modern LED signals were erected and eight manual level crossings were replaced by full barrier crossings with security cameras. The line was closed every weekend and on public holidays, with bus replacement services provided.

There was opposition from the town of Frinton to keep the manual gates. Folklore has it that townspeople used to lock the gates to keep out coach-loads of tourists.

== Infrastructure ==
The line is double track except for the branch between Thorpe-le-Soken and Walton-on-the-Naze which is single track. It is electrified at 25 kV AC, has a loading gauge of W6 and a line speed limit of between 30 and 75 mph (48–121 km/h). The branch to Colchester Town has a maximum speed limit of 30 mph (48 km/h). The Engineer's Line Reference for the line from Colchester Junction to Clacton is COC, and from Thorpe-le-Soken Junction to Walton-on-the-Naze is TWN.

Passenger train services are operated by Class 720 electric multiple units. The Walton-on-the-Naze to Colchester local services are typically formed of five carriages. The Clacton-on-Sea to London Liverpool Street services are typically formed of ten carriages.

=== Stations ===
The following table summarises the line's 12 stations, their distance measured from London Liverpool Street, and estimated number of passenger entries/exits in 2018–19:

Station	Location	Local authority	Mileage	Patronage
Colchester	North Colchester	City of Colchester	51 3/4	4,453,178
Branch to Colchester Town:
Colchester Town	Central Colchester	City of Colchester	54	771,090
Main section to Thorpe-le-Soken:
Hythe	Hythe	City of Colchester	53 1/2	265,716
Wivenhoe	Wivenhoe	City of Colchester	56	401,240
Alresford	Alresford	District of Tendring	57 3/4	62,994
Great Bentley	Great Bentley	District of Tendring	60 3/4	81,144
Weeley	Weeley	District of Tendring	63	34,908
Thorpe-le-Soken	Thorpe-le-Soken	District of Tendring	65	131,088
Branch to Clacton-on-Sea:
Clacton-on-Sea	Clacton-on-Sea	District of Tendring	69 3/4	799,344
Branch to Walton-on-the-Naze:
Kirby Cross	Kirby Cross	District of Tendring	67 3/4	44,782
Frinton-on-Sea	Frinton-on-Sea	District of Tendring	68 3/4	200,904
Walton-on-the-Naze	Walton-on-the-Naze	District of Tendring	70 1/4	136,708

== Services ==
The typical Monday to Saturday off-peak service on the line is:

- 1 train per hour (tph) between Clacton-on-Sea and London Liverpool Street, calling at Thorpe-le-Soken, Wivenhoe, Hythe, Colchester, Witham, Chelmsford, Ingatestone, Shenfield, Stratford and London Liverpool Street
- 1 tph between Walton-on-the-Naze and Colchester, calling at Frinton-on-Sea, Kirby Cross, Thorpe-le-Soken, Weeley, Great Bentley, Alresford, Wivenhoe, Hythe, Colchester Town and Colchester. This service waits for the Clacton-on-Sea service to pass at Thorpe-le-Soken.
- 1 tph between Colchester and Colchester Town
