= Wivenhoe railway station =

Railway station in Essex, England

Wivenhoe
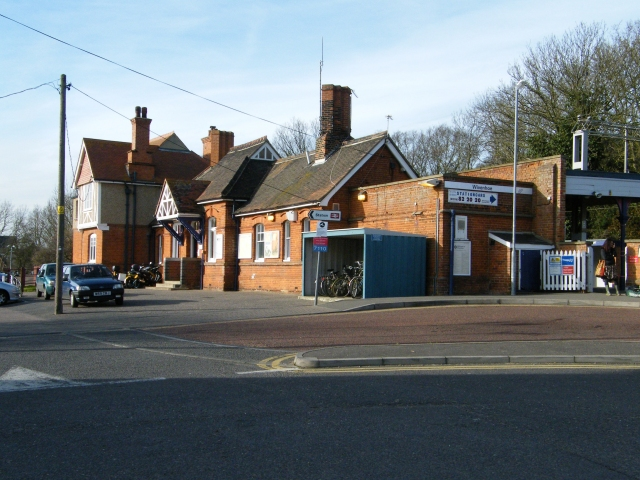
- Wivenhoe railway station in 2008

General information
- Location: Wivenhoe, Colchester; England
- Coordinates: 51.857°N 0.956°E
- Grid reference: TM112214
- Managed by: Greater Anglia
- Platforms: 2

Other information
- Station code: WIV
- Classification: DfT category E

Key dates
- 8 May 1863: Opened as Wivenhoe
- July 1879: Renamed Wyvenhoe
- October 1911: Renamed Wivenhoe

Passengers
- 2020/21: ▼70,786
- Interchange: ▼589
- 2021/22: ▲0.217 million
- Interchange: ▲1,531
- 2022/23: ▲0.279 million
- Interchange: ▼1,238
- 2023/24: ▲0.324 million
- Interchange: ▲1,349
- 2024/25: ▲0.352 million
- Interchange: ▲471
Location
Notes
- Passenger statistics from the Office of Rail and Road

Wivenhoe railway station is on the Sunshine Coast Line, a branch of the Great Eastern Main Line, in the East of England, serving the town of Wivenhoe, Essex. It is 56 miles (90 km) down the line from London Liverpool Street and is situated between Hythe to the west and Alresford to the east. Its three-letter station code is WIV.

The station was opened by the Tendring Hundred Railway, a subsidiary of the Great Eastern Railway, in 1863. It has two platforms, a staffed ticket office, and is currently operated by Abellio Greater Anglia, which also runs all trains serving the station.

It is a short distance from the River Colne at Wivenhoe quay and its car park is the starting point of the Wivenhoe Trail, a cycle track that runs alongside the river to Colchester.

== History ==
Wivenhoe station was opened on 8 May 1863 by the Tendring Hundred Railway, which was worked by the Great Eastern Railway. From July 1879 its name was spelt Wyvenhoe; in October 1911 it reverted to the original spelling, Wivenhoe.

A few hundred metres east of the station there was a junction for the single-track branch line to Brightlingsea. This branch was opened in April 1866 and closed as part of the Beeching cuts in June 1964 and the tracks lifted. A bridge over Alresford Creek was also later demolished.

== Services ==
All services at Wivenhoe are operated by Greater Anglia using Class 720 EMUs.

The typical off-peak service in trains per hour is:

- 1 tph to London Liverpool Street
- 1 tph to Colchester via Colchester Town
- 1 tph to Clacton-on-Sea
- 1 tph to Walton-on-the-Naze

Additional services call at the station during the peak hours.

On Sundays, the services between Colchester and Walton-on-the-Naze do not run.

Preceding station	National Rail	Following station
Hythe	Greater Anglia Sunshine Coast Line	Alresford or Thorpe-le-Soken
Disused railways
Hythe	Great Eastern Railway Tendring Hundred Railway	Brightlingsea
