= Hythe railway station (Essex) =

Railway station in Essex, England

Hythe
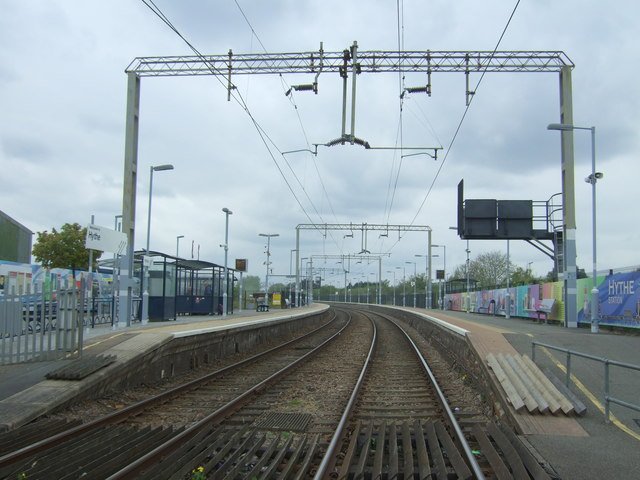
- Hythe station in April 2017

General information
- Location: Hythe, Colchester; England
- Coordinates: 51.886°N 0.927°E
- Grid reference: TM015248
- Managed by: Greater Anglia
- Platforms: 2

Other information
- Station code: HYH
- Classification: DfT category F2

Key dates
- 1 April 1847: Opened for freight
- 8 May 1863: Opened for passengers

Passengers
- 2020/21: ▼59,242
- 2021/22: ▲0.178 million
- 2022/23: ▲0.266 million
- 2023/24: ▲0.328 million
- 2024/25: ▲0.433 million
Location
Notes
- Passenger statistics from the Office of Rail and Road

Hythe railway station in Essex is on the Sunshine Coast Line, a branch of the Great Eastern Main Line in the East of England, serving Hythe and other eastern areas of Colchester. It is 53 miles 49 chains (86.3 km) down the line from London Liverpool Street. Its three-letter station code is HYH.

The station was opened in 1847 by the Colchester, Stour Valley, Sudbury & Halstead Railway, then part of the Eastern Union Railway, initially for goods only and then in 1863 for passenger services. It is currently managed by Abellio Greater Anglia, which also operates all trains serving the station.

To the west of the station is a triangle of lines, with three junctions. The lines lead to either Colchester Town or Colchester stations; the junctions are known as Hythe Junction, East Gates Junction (at the northern extremity of the triangle) and Colne Junction (at the western extremity). To the east the next station along the line is Wivenhoe.

== History ==
A line to Hythe Quay was opened on 1 April 1847 by the Colchester, Stour Valley, Sudbury & Halstead Railway, which was worked by the Eastern Union Railway (EUR) and was a freight-only line. Hythe station was opened to passenger services on 8 May 1863 by the Tendring Hundred Railway, which opened to Wivenhoe and was operated by the Great Eastern Railway from the outset.

There are still sidings present at Hythe but they are no longer in use, and there was once a short branch to Hythe quay which crossed the River Colne adjacent to the station by a small iron bridge. There is no evidence today of the former quayside tracks, but aerial photograph sites clearly show the exact alignments.

There was also a spur from the station to Colchester Gas Works, which ran along the street to Hythe quay. This became redundant in 1973 when the United Kingdom switched from town gas to natural gas. Little trace now remains of this, except a small section of trackbed at Hythe, and the piers of the bridge (removed around 2007) over the River Colne.

Hythe station underwent major renovation in 2008 and 2009, including the extension of the platforms to accommodate 12-coach train sets, the demolition of the original station building, and the dismantling of the disused coal depot. The north siding was also removed, as was the pointwork and a short section of track leading to the south sidings. The station building remained until its demolition in June 2009 but had not been used for many years. Consequently, it had been subjected to vandalism.

The rebuilt station has a bright image and modern facilities incorporating a ticket-machine on the northbound platform 1. It also now accommodates longer trains to and from London Liverpool Street during peak times with no need to change at Colchester.

The station also has car-parking facilities providing short- and long-term parking for commuters and the wider public; these are adjacent to the London-bound platform with easy access to the station. Other facilities include a café and car-wash.

== Services ==
All services at Hythe are operated by Greater Anglia using Class 720 EMUs.

The typical off-peak service in trains per hour is:

- 1 tph to London Liverpool Street
- 1 tph to Colchester via Colchester Town
- 1 tph to Clacton-on-Sea
- 1 tph to Walton-on-the-Naze

Additional services call at the station during the peak hours.

On Sundays, the services between Colchester and Walton-on-the-Naze do not run.

Preceding station	National Rail	Following station
Colchester	Greater Anglia Sunshine Coast Line	Wivenhoe
Colchester Town	Greater Anglia Sunshine Coast Line	Wivenhoe
