= Clacton-on-Sea railway station =

Railway station in Essex, England

Clacton-on-Sea
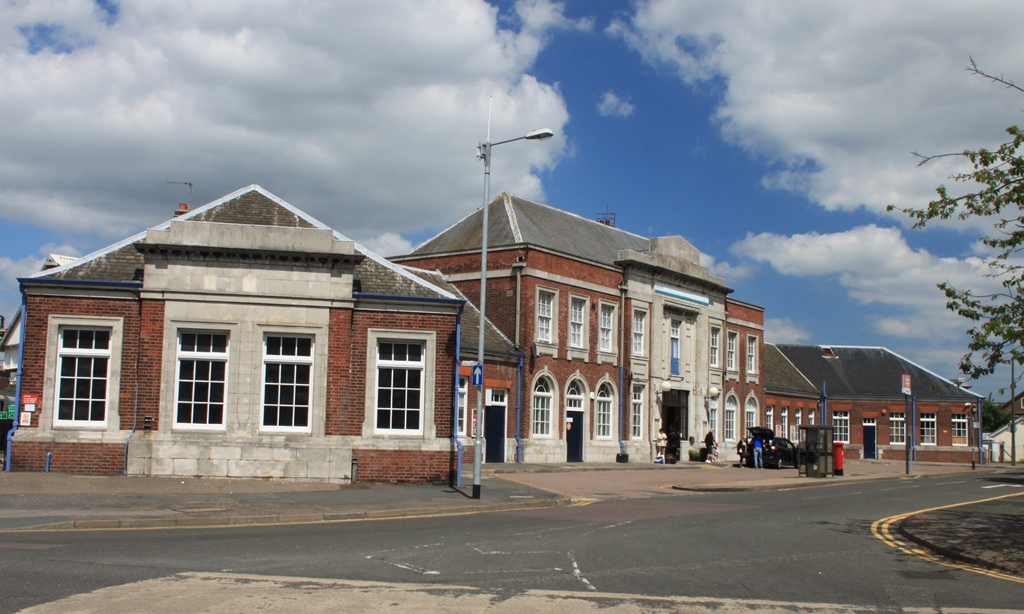
- Station entrance as seen in June 2013

General information
- Location: Clacton-on-Sea, Tendring; England
- Coordinates: 51.7936°N 1.1541°E
- Grid reference: TM176153
- Manager: Greater Anglia
- Platforms: 4

Other information
- Station code: CLT
- Classification: DfT category C1

History
- Opened: 4 July 1882

Passengers
- 2020/21: ▼0.277 million
- 2021/22: ▲0.624 million
- 2022/23: ▲0.706 million
- 2023/24: ▲0.793 million
- 2024/25: ▲0.837 million
- 2025/26: ▲0.899 million
Location
Notes
- Passenger statistics from the Office of Rail and Road

Clacton-on-Sea railway station is one of the two eastern termini of the Sunshine Coast Line in the East of England, serving the town of Clacton-on-Sea, Essex. The line is a branch that diverges from the Great Eastern Main Line at Colchester, from where trains also run to Colchester Town and Walton-on-the-Naze. It is 69 miles 56 chains (112.17 km) down the line from London Liverpool Street. Its three-letter station code is CLT and it is managed by Greater Anglia, which also operates all trains serving the station.

== History ==
The station was opened in 1882 with the name Clacton.

Clacton is on a spur from Thorpe-le-Soken which was built by the Clacton-on-Sea Railway and originally operated by the Great Eastern Railway; it opened some 15 years after the branch to Walton was opened.

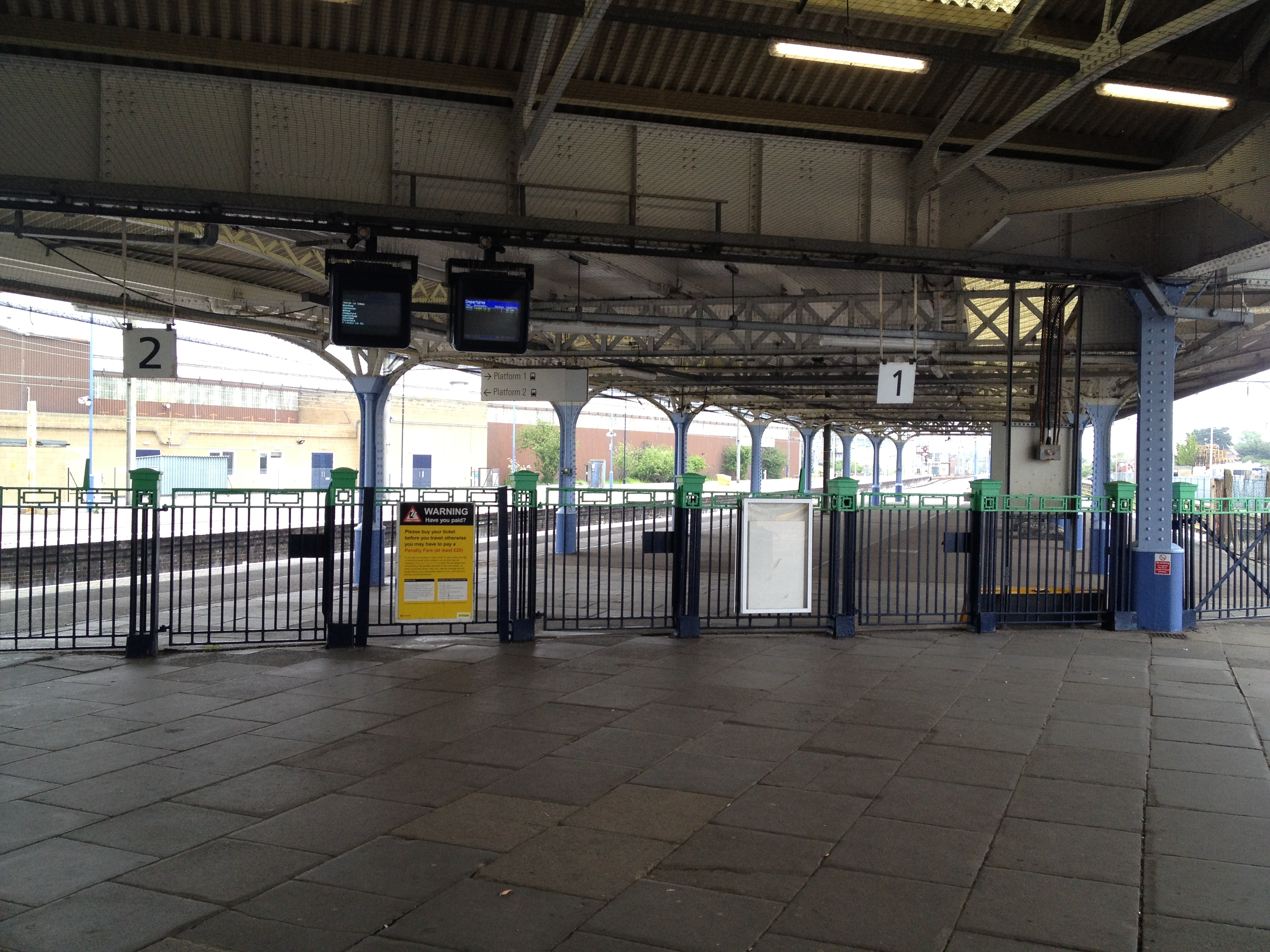
Station concourse, May 2012

On 1 January 1923, the station passed to the London and North Eastern Railway following the Railways Act 1921. After World War II and following nationalisation, it fell under the auspices of British Railways (Eastern Region).

Services were steam-operated until the line was electrified, with Clacton first seeing electric trains on 16 March 1959. Initially, the line was only electrified as far as Colchester, as part of British Railways' experiments with 25 kV AC electrification, rather than the previously preferred 1500 V DC system. Through electrified services to Liverpool Street were introduced on 7 January 1963.

Clacton station has a sizeable concourse sheltered by a glazed roof. Platforms 1 and 3 have an operational length for ten-coach trains, platforms 2 and 4 have an operational length for twelve-coach trains. Clacton Servicing Depot lies just beyond the platform ends, with some stabling sidings alongside the station itself.

Its name was changed to Clacton-on-Sea in May 2007.

== Service ==
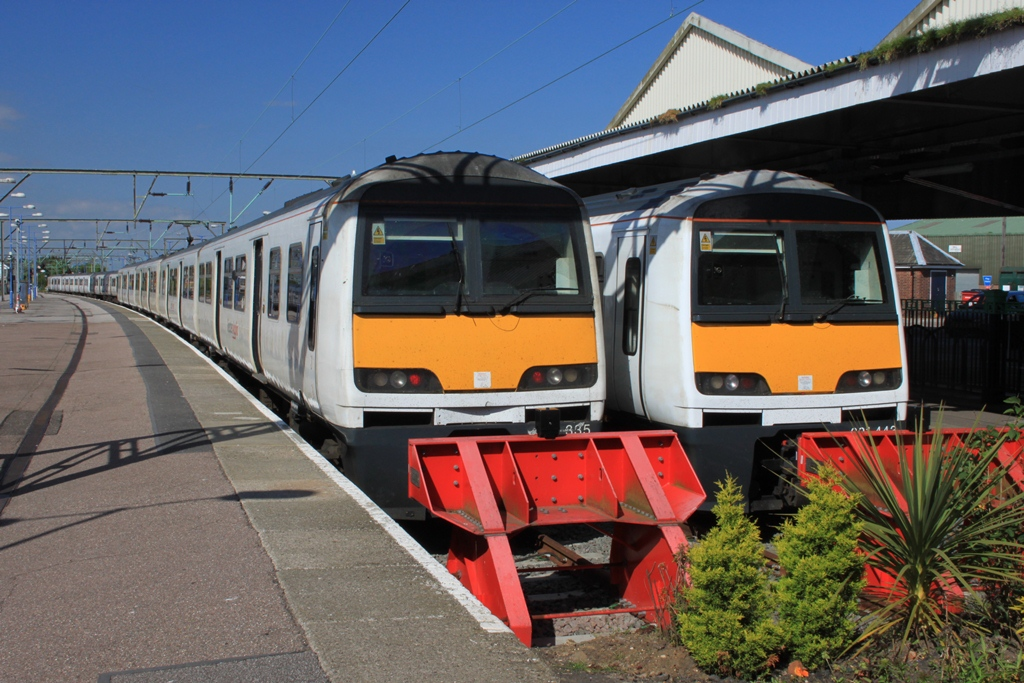
Two Class 321 trains at Clacton-on-Sea in July 2013

The typical service is one train per hour to London Liverpool Street, calling at Thorpe-le-Soken, Wivenhoe, Colchester, Witham, Chelmsford, Ingatestone, Shenfield and Stratford. During peak hours, the service level is increased to approximately four trains per hour. The first and last trains of the day start and terminate at Colchester.

Trains are usually formed of Class 720 electric multiple units. The Class 321 electric multiple units that used to form the services at this station were withdrawn at the end of April 2023.

Preceding station	National Rail	Following station
Thorpe-le-Soken	Greater Anglia Sunshine Coast Line; Clacton branch	Terminus
