= Grade II* listed buildings in Tendring =

There are over 20,000 Grade II* listed buildings in England. This page is a list of these buildings in the district of Tendring in Essex.

== Tendring ==
| Name | Location | Type | Completed (Note: The date given is the date used by Historic England as significant for the initial building or that of an important part in the structure's description.) | Date designated | Grid ref. (Note: The grid reference is based on the British national grid reference system, sometimes known as OSGB36, used by the Ordnance Survey.) Geo-coordinates | Entry number (Note: The "List Entry Number" is a unique number assigned to each listed building and scheduled monument by Historic England.) | Image |
|---|---|---|---|---|---|---|---|
| The Quarters | Alresford Park, Alresford, Tendring | House | c. 1951 | 21 February 1950 | TM0721520124; 51°50′29″N 1°00′24″E | 1337178 | Upload Photo |
| Church of St Mary | Ardleigh, Tendring | Parish Church | 14th century | 17 November 1966 | TM0539129550; 51°55′36″N 0°59′09″E | 1112060 | Church of St Mary More images |
| Spring Valley Mill | Ardleigh, Tendring | Mill | Late 18th century | 17 November 1966 | TM0383027745; 51°54′39″N 0°57′43″E | 1112053 | Spring Valley Mill More images |
| Beaumont Hall | Beaumont-cum-Moze, Tendring | House | Late 17th century | 29 April 1952 | TM1796924590; 51°52′38″N 1°09′55″E | 1322628 | Beaumont Hall More images |
| Beaumont Rectory | Beaumont-cum-Moze, Tendring | House | c. 1800 | 29 April 1952 | TM1777324977; 51°52′51″N 1°09′46″E | 1112125 | Upload Photo |
| Elmstead Hall | Elmstead, Tendring | House | Later | 21 February 1950 | TM0642326001; 51°53′40″N 0°59′55″E | 1146647 | Elmstead Hall More images |
| Church of All Saints | Great Holland, Frinton and Walton, Tendring | Parish Church | C15/C16 | 21 June 1950 | TM2191819356; 51°49′43″N 1°13′09″E | 1165610 | Church of All Saints More images |
| Church of St Mary | Frinton-on-Sea, Frinton and Walton, Tendring | Church | 14th century | 21 June 1950 | TM2371819483; 51°49′45″N 1°14′43″E | 1111530 | Church of St Mary More images |
| Church of St Michael | Kirby-le-Soken, Frinton and Walton, Tendring | Parish Church | 14th century | 22 June 1950 | TM2196022033; 51°51′10″N 1°13′17″E | 1111500 | Church of St Michael More images |
| Naze Tower | Walton-on-the-Naze, Frinton and Walton, Tendring | Navigational tower | 1720 | 21 June 1984 | TM2648623539; 51°51′52″N 1°17′17″E | 1165846 | Naze Tower More images |
| The Homestead | Frinton on Sea, Frinton and Walton, Tendring | House | 1905-6 | 18 May 1979 | TM2335319396; 51°49′43″N 1°14′24″E | 1111531 | The Homestead More images |
| Copley Dene and Wall Attached to Left | Great Bromley, Tendring | House | Early/mid 18th century | 21 February 1950 | TM0846925427; 51°53′18″N 1°01′41″E | 1147103 | Upload Photo |
| Church of All Saints | Dovercourt, Harwich, Tendring | Church | Medieval | 25 September 1951 | TM2383931102; 51°56′00″N 1°15′17″E | 1205059 | Church of All Saints More images |
| Church of St Nicholas | Harwich, Tendring | Church | 1822 | 25 September 1951 | TM2611632584; 51°56′45″N 1°17′19″E | 1281276 | Church of St Nicholas More images |
| Electric Palace Cinema | Harwich, Tendring | Cinema | 1911 | 18 September 1972 | TM2613232673; 51°56′48″N 1°17′20″E | 1204934 | Electric Palace Cinema More images |
| High House | Harwich, Tendring | House | c. 1820 | 30 June 1964 | TM2615032541; 51°56′43″N 1°17′21″E | 1204838 | Upload Photo |
| High Lighthouse | Harwich, Tendring | Lighthouse | Disused | 30 June 1964 | TM2611632438; 51°56′40″N 1°17′19″E | 1280598 | High Lighthouse More images |
| No 26, Kings Head St. and Frontage Wall to South East | Harwich, Tendring | House | Late 16th century | 25 September 1951 | TM2595632764; 51°56′51″N 1°17′11″E | 1281089 | Upload Photo |
| Old Naval Yard Crane | Harwich, Tendring | Crane | 1667 | 25 September 1951 | TM2621232468; 51°56′41″N 1°17′24″E | 1187899 | Old Naval Yard Crane More images |
| Redoubt | Harwich, Tendring | Moat | 1808-1810 | 20 June 1972 | TM2616432179; 51°56′32″N 1°17′21″E | 1187916 | Redoubt More images |
| The Old Swan House | Harwich, Tendring | House | 16th century | 25 September 1951 | TM2597232720; 51°56′49″N 1°17′12″E | 1281210 | The Old Swan House More images |
| 10 King's Quay Street | Harwich, Tendring | House | Late 18th century | 20 June 1972 | TM2602932778; 51°56′51″N 1°17′15″E | 1187905 | Upload Photo |
| 34 and 35 Church Street | Harwich, Tendring | House | 17th century | 25 September 1951 | TM2592632710; 51°56′49″N 1°17′10″E | 1187884 | Upload Photo |
| 42 and 42a Church Street | Harwich, Tendring | House | Mid 18th century | 25 September 1951 | TM2595532718; 51°56′49″N 1°17′11″E | 1298480 | Upload Photo |
| Church of St Mary | Little Bromley, Tendring | Parish Church | Early 12th century | 17 November 1966 | TM0917527821; 51°54′35″N 1°02′23″E | 1337175 | Church of St Mary More images |
| Church of St James | Little Clacton, Tendring | Parish Church | Earlier than 14th century | 17 November 1966 | TM1661218820; 51°49′34″N 1°08′31″E | 1165915 | Church of St James More images |
| St Mary's House | Little Oakley, Tendring | House | 1987 | 30 January 1987 | TM2120928462; 51°54′39″N 1°12′53″E | 1112098 | Upload Photo |
| Ramsey Windmill | Ramsey and Parkeston, Tendring | Windmill | 1842 | 29 April 1952 | TM2092130407; 51°55′42″N 1°12′43″E | 1147549 | Ramsey Windmill More images |
| Roydon Hall Farmhouse | Ramsey and Parkeston, Tendring | Jettied House | Late 16th century | 29 April 1952 | TM1896930206; 51°55′38″N 1°11′00″E | 1308521 | Upload Photo |
| White House Farmhouse | Ramsey and Parkeston, Tendring | Farmhouse | Mid 16th century | 30 January 1987 | TM2099030248; 51°55′37″N 1°12′46″E | 1112106 | Upload Photo |
| Little Priory & the Old House | St Osyth, Tendring | House | c. 1530 | 29 April 1952 | TM1234315569; 51°47′54″N 1°04′41″E | 1166252 | Upload Photo |
| St Osyth's Priory Outbuilding Adjacent to North of Dairy Qv 15/188 Now a Barn | St. Osyth, Tendring | Barn | Medieval | 21 February 1950 | TM1205715701; 51°47′59″N 1°04′27″E | 1166310 | Upload Photo |
| St Osyth's Priory Wall Between Southern Wing of Convalescent Home Qv 15/197 and Darcy Tower Qv 15/199 | St. Osyth, Tendring | Gate | 1987 | 21 February 1950 | TM1215515709; 51°47′59″N 1°04′32″E | 1111465 | Upload Photo |
| St Osyth's Priory boundary walls | St. Osyth, Tendring | Wall | Mainly 14th-17th century, possibly 12th century in origin | 21 February 1950 | TM1205915566 | 1337160 | St Osyth's Priory boundary walls More images |
| Church of St Edmund | Tendring | Parish Church | 13th century | 17 November 1966 | TM1433724152; 51°52′29″N 1°06′44″E | 1112122 | Church of St Edmund More images |
| Comarques | Thorpe-le-Soken, Tendring | House | Mid 18th century | 29 April 1952 | TM1748922640; 51°51′36″N 1°09′26″E | 1112108 | Upload Photo |
| Parish Church of St Michael | Thorpe-le-Soken, Tendring | Church | 15th century | 30 January 1987 | TM1792922294; 51°51′24″N 1°09′48″E | 1147716 | Parish Church of St Michael More images |
| The Abbey | Thorpe-le-Soken, Tendring | Jettied House | Mid 16th century | 29 April 1952 | TM1806422286; 51°51′24″N 1°09′55″E | 1322618 | The Abbey More images |
| The Bell Hotel | Thorpe-le-Soken, Tendring | Church House | c. 1500 | 29 April 1952 | TM1796822310; 51°51′24″N 1°09′50″E | 1112112 | The Bell Hotel More images |
| Church of St Mary Magdelene | Thorrington, Tendring | Parish Church | Early 14th century | 17 November 1966 | TM0985819622; 51°50′09″N 1°02′41″E | 1265150 | Church of St Mary Magdelene More images |
| Thorrington Tide Mill and Attached Dam Wall to North West | Thorrington, Tendring | Mill and Dam | 19th century | 29 April 1952 | TM0823419438; 51°50′05″N 1°01′15″E | 1265152 | Thorrington Tide Mill and Attached Dam Wall to North West More images |
| Church of St Andrew | Weeley, Tendring | Parish Church | C15/C16 | 17 November 1966 | TM1541821528; 51°51′03″N 1°07′35″E | 1265107 | Church of St Andrew More images |
| Parish Church of All Saints | Wrabness, Tendring | Church | Early 12th century | 30 January 1987 | TM1742431889; 51°56′35″N 1°09′43″E | 1112074 | Parish Church of All Saints More images |
| Cann Hall | Tendring | House | 18th century | 4 July 1986 | TM1664416767; 51°48′27″N 1°08′28″E | 1111549 | Upload Photo |
| Church of St James | Tendring | Church | 1912-12 | 5 March 1997 | TM1722114528; 51°47′14″N 1°08′53″E | 1257896 | Church of St James More images |
