= Tendring Rural District =

Former rural district in Essex, England

Coordinates: 51.859°N 1.119°E

Tendring
- Rural district
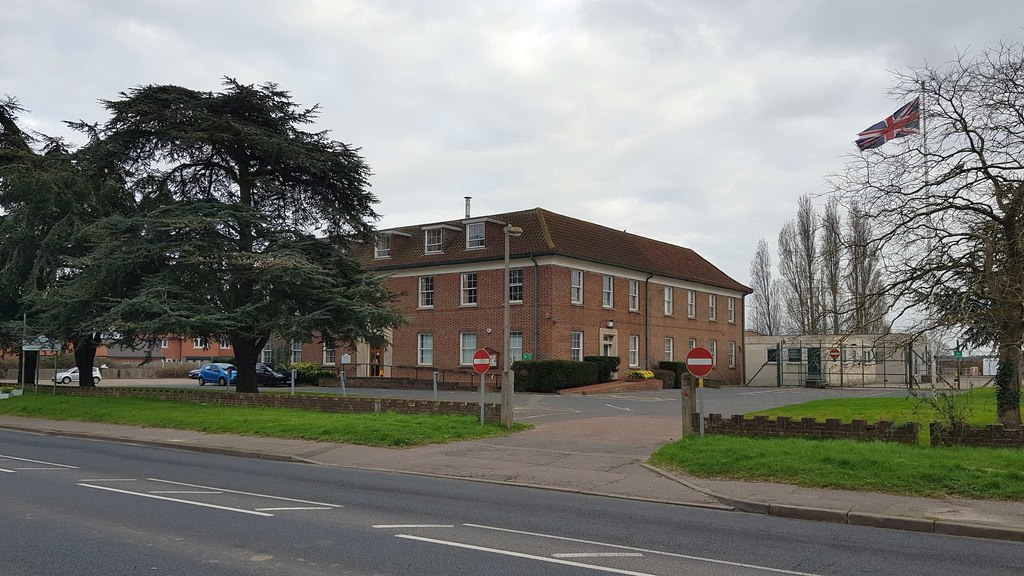
- Council Offices, Thorpe Road, Weeley: Council's headquarters 1939–1974
- Area
  - 1971: 26,775 hectares (66,162 acres)
- Population
  - 1901: 20,340
  - 1971: 30,427
- History
  - Created: 28 December 1894
  - Abolished: 31 March 1974
  - Succeeded by: Tendring District
- Status: Rural district
  - HQ: Weeley

Tendring Rural District was a rural district in Essex, England, from 1894 to 1974, covering a coastal area in the north-east of the county. It was replaced in 1974 with the similarly named but larger Tendring District.

== History ==
The district had its origins in the Tendring Poor Law Union, which had been created in 1835 for a group of parishes to collectively deliver their responsibilities under the poor laws. The union took its name from the ancient Tendring hundred of Essex, which had covered a similar area. The hundred had in turn been named after the village of Tendring at the centre of the area. A workhouse was completed in 1838 to serve the union at Tendring Heath, to the north of Tendring village.

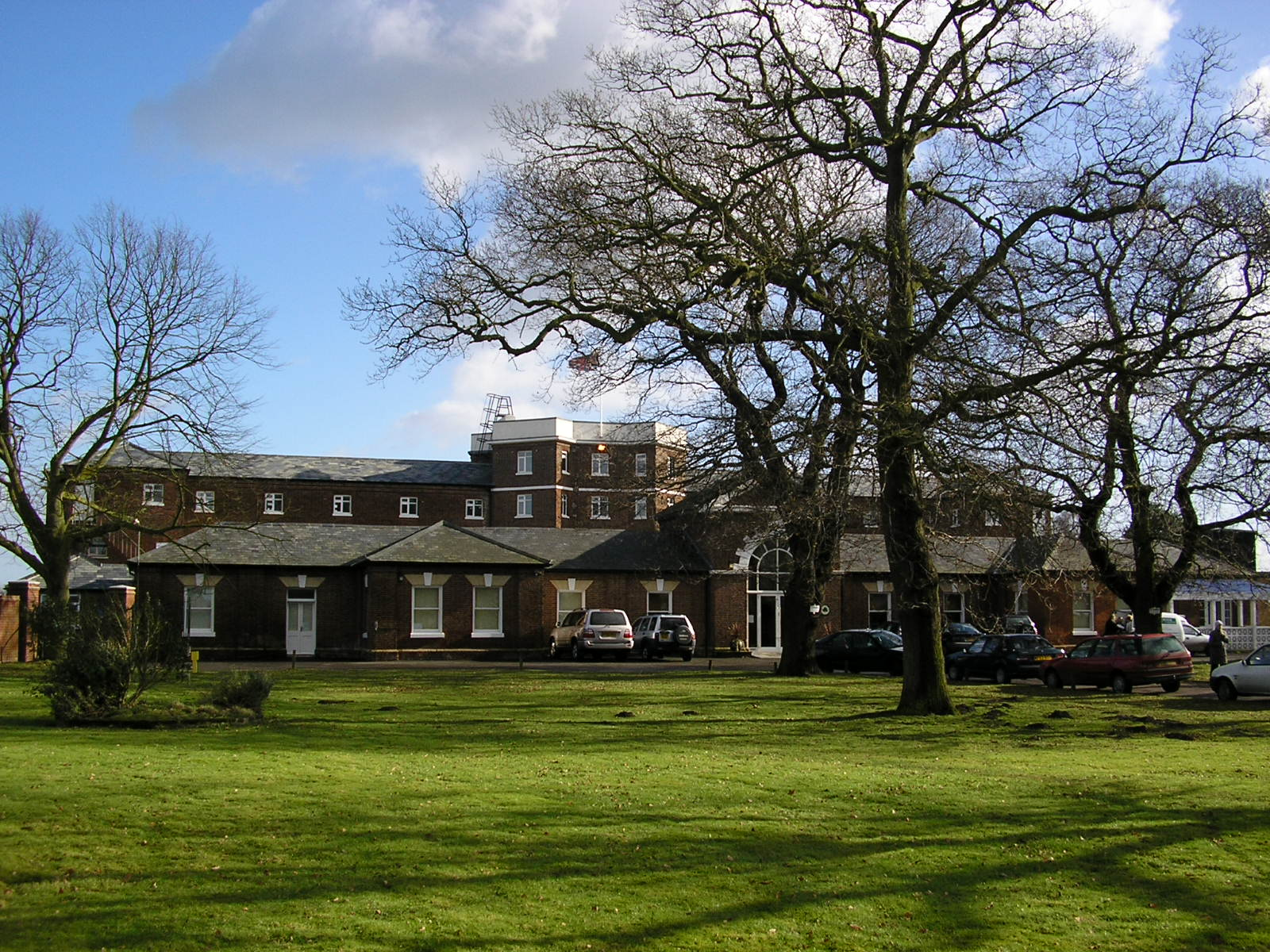
Former Tendring Union Workhouse, Tendring Heath

In 1872, sanitary districts were established. In rural areas, public health and local government responsibilities were given to the existing boards of guardians of poor law unions. The Tendring Rural Sanitary District therefore covered the area of the poor law union except for Harwich and Walton-on-the-Naze, which formed their own urban sanitary districts. Clacton was subsequently also made its own urban sanitary district in 1891, removing it from the rural sanitary district.

Rural sanitary districts were reconstituted as rural districts with their own elected councils with effect from 28 December 1894, under the Local Government Act 1894. The link with the poor law union continued in that all the rural district councillors were thereafter ex officio members of the board of guardians. Tendring Rural District Council held its first official meeting on 9 January 1895 at the workhouse. John Woodgate, who was already the chairman of the board of guardians, was elected as the first chairman of the rural district council.

The parish of Brightlingsea was removed from the rural district in 1896 when it was made its own urban district, as was Frinton in 1901. In 1934, three parishes were removed from the rural district; Great Holland and Kirby-le-Soken were merged with the urban districts of Frinton-on-Sea and Walton-on-the Naze to become the new urban district of Frinton and Walton, whilst the parish of Little Holland, which contained Holland-on-Sea, was absorbed into Clacton Urban District.

In its early years, the rural district council met at the workhouse at Tendring Heath, and its staff were based at various locations across the area and in the neighbouring towns. In 1939 the council built itself a new headquarters on Thorpe Road at Weeley, and remained based there until the council's abolition in 1974.

The rural district was abolished in 1974. The area was merged with the borough of Harwich and the urban districts of Brightlingsea, Clacton, and Frinton and Walton to became a new non-metropolitan district that was also named Tendring.

== Parishes ==
The civil parishes in Tendring Rural District were:

- Alresford
- Ardleigh
- Beaumont-cum-Moze
- Bradfield
- Brightlingsea (until 1896)
- Elmstead
- Frating
- Frinton (until 1901)
- Great Bentley
- Great Bromley
- Great Holland (until 1934)
- Great Oakley
- Kirby-le-Soken (until 1934)
- Lawford
- Little Bentley
- Little Bromley
- Little Clacton
- Little Holland (until 1934)
- Little Oakley
- Manningtree
- Mistley
- Ramsey
- St Osyth
- Tendring
- Thorpe-le-Soken
- Thorrington
- Weeley
- Wix
- Wrabness
