= Listed buildings in Tendring District =

Listed buildings in Essex, England

There are around 970 listed buildings in the Tendring District, which are buildings of architectural or historic interest.

- Grade I buildings are of exceptional interest.
- Grade II* buildings are particularly important buildings of more than special interest.
- Grade II buildings are of special interest.

The lists follow Historic England’s geographical organisation, with entries grouped by county, local authority, and parish (civil and non-civil). The following lists are arranged by parish.

Parish	List of listed buildings	Grade I	Grade II*	Grade II	Total
Alresford	Listed buildings in Alresford, Essex				
Ardleigh	Listed buildings in Ardleigh				
Beaumont-cum-Moze	Listed buildings in Beaumont-cum-Moze				
Bradfield	Listed buildings in Bradfield, Essex				
Brightlingsea	Listed buildings in Brightlingsea				
Elmstead	Listed buildings in Elmstead, Essex				
Frating	Listed buildings in Frating				
Frinton and Walton	Listed buildings in Frinton and Walton				
Great Bentley	Listed buildings in Great Bentley				
Great Bromley	Listed buildings in Great Bromley				
Great Oakley	Listed buildings in Great Oakley, Essex				
Harwich	Listed buildings in Harwich				
Lawford	Listed buildings in Lawford				
Little Bentley	Listed buildings in Little Bentley				
Little Bromley	Listed buildings in Little Bromley				
Little Clacton	Listed buildings in Little Clacton				
Little Oakley	Listed buildings in Little Oakley, Essex				
Manningtree	Listed buildings in Manningtree				
Mistley	Listed buildings in Mistley				
Ramsey and Parkeston	Listed buildings in Ramsey and Parkeston				
St Osyth	Listed buildings in St Osyth				
Tendring	Listed buildings in Tendring, Essex				
Thorpe-le-Soken	Listed buildings in Thorpe-le-Soken				
Thorrington	Listed buildings in Thorrington				
Weeley	Listed buildings in Weeley				
Wix	Listed buildings in Wix, Essex				
Wrabness	Listed buildings in Wrabness				

== See also ==
- Grade I listed buildings in Essex
- Grade II* listed buildings in Essex

== Sources ==
- Wilson, Bill; Pevsner, Nikolaus (1999) [1962], Norfolk 2: North-West and South, The Buildings of England, New Haven and London: Yale University Press, ISBN 978-0-300-09657-6
