= Frating =

Village in Essex, England

Coordinates: 51.86042°N 1.02219°E

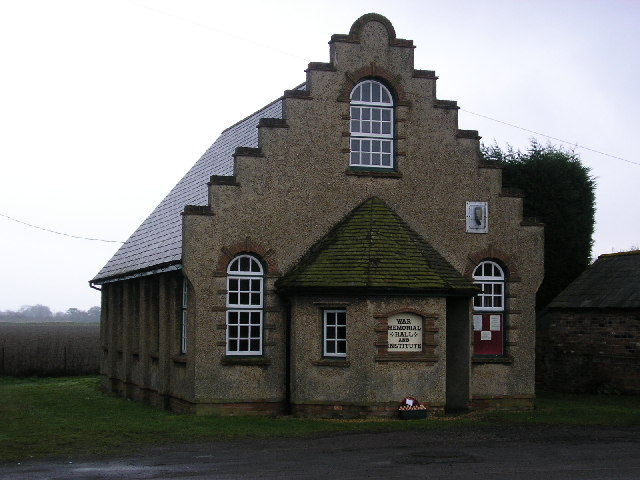
- Frating Village Hall

- Location within Essex
- Population: 622 (Parish, 2021)
- OS grid reference: TM082223
- Civil parish: Frating
- District: Tendring
- Shire county: Essex
- Region: East
- Country: England
- Sovereign state: United Kingdom
- Post town: Colchester
- Postcode district: CO7

Frating is a village and civil parish in the Tendring district of Essex, England. It is about 5 miles (8 km) east of Colchester and 9 miles (15 km) northwest of Clacton-on-Sea. The parish includes the settlements of Frating Green and Hockley. At the 2021 census the parish had a population of 622.

The former parish church has been converted into a private house. The living was a rectory shared with Thorrington. The dedication of the church is not known.

The village hall is the Frating War Memorial Hall and Institute, which celebrated its 100th anniversary in September 2022.

Great Bentley railway station is two miles away and is served by Greater Anglia services to Colchester, Walton-on-the-Naze, London Liverpool Street and Clacton-on-Sea.

There is one public house; The Kings Arms.

== Bus services ==
Service	Operator	Route	Days of Operation
97	First Essex	Walton-on-the-Naze - Frinton-on-Sea - Kirby Cross - Great Holland - Holland-on-Sea - Clacton-on-Sea - Great Clacton - Little Clacton - Weeley - Frating - Elmstead Market - Colchester	Mon-Sat (every 60 mins)
97A	First Essex	Walton-on-the-Naze - Frinton-on-Sea - Kirby Cross - Great Holland - Holland-on-Sea - Clacton-on-Sea - Great Clacton - Little Clacton - Weeley - Frating - Elmstead Market - University of Essex - Colchester	Mon-Sat (every 60 mins)
X76	Hedingham & Chambers	Jaywick - Clacton-on-Sea - Great Clacton - Little Clacton - Weeley - Frating - Elmstead Market - Colchester	Mon-Sat (every 30 mins)
87C	Hedingham & Chambers	Weeley - Frating - Elmstead Market - Wivenhoe - Alresford, Essex - Thorrington - The Colne Community School and College	Mon-Fri (once each way daily)
77	Arriva Colchester	St Osyth Beach - St Osyth - Aingers Green - Great Bentley - Frating - Elmstead Market - Colchester - Colchester railway station	Mon-Fri (infrequent)
77A	Arriva Colchester	St Osyth Beach - St Osyth - Aingers Green - Great Bentley - Frating - Great Bromley - Crockleford Heath - Greenstead Estate - Colchester - Colchester railway station	Mon-Fri (infrequent)
76	First Essex	Clacton-on-Sea - Great Clacton - Little Clacton - Weeley - Frating - Elmstead Market - University of Essex - Colchester	Sun (every 2hrs)
