= Kirby Cross =

Village in Essex, England

Coordinates: 51.841°N 1.219°E

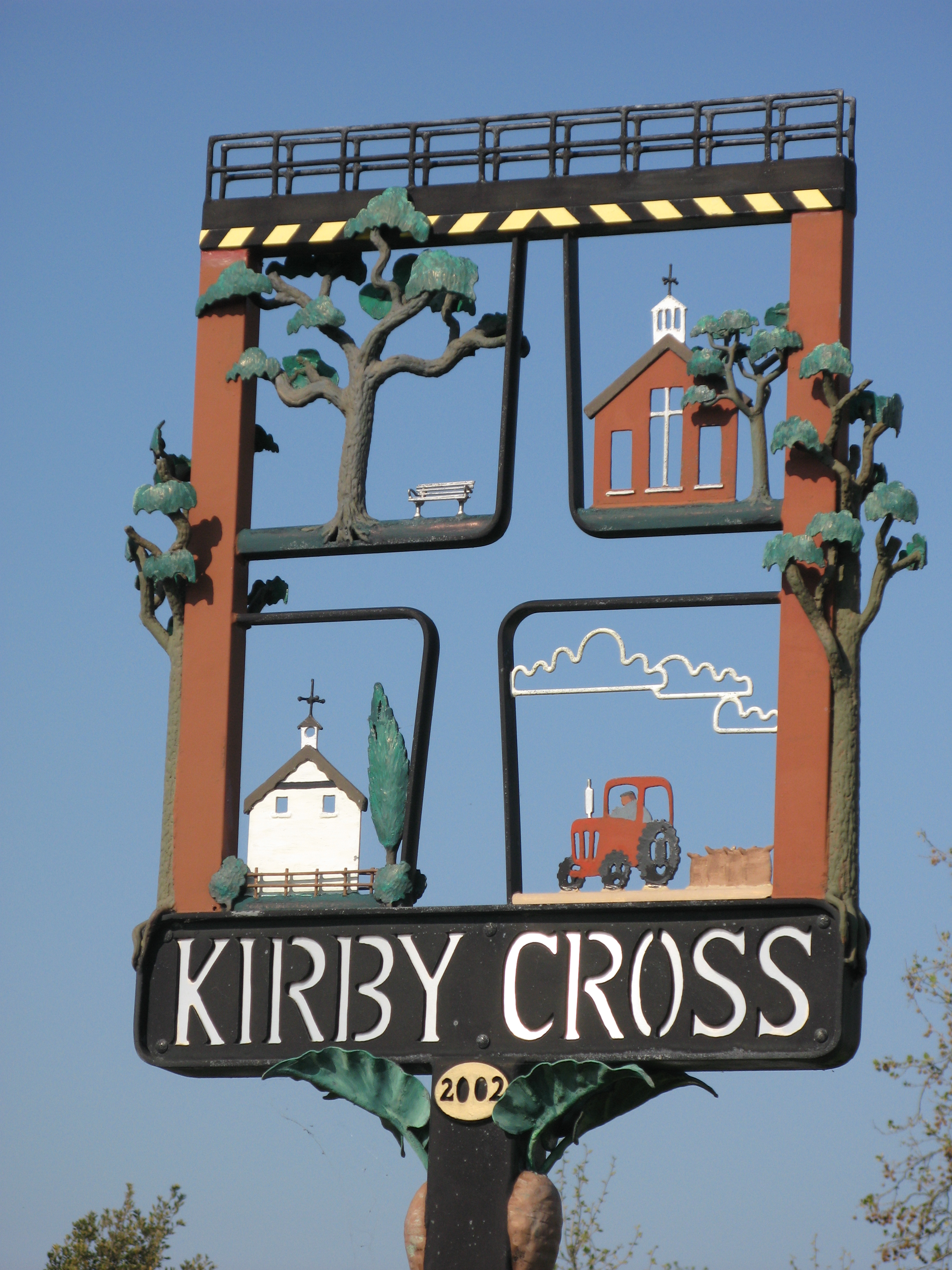

- Location within Essex
- OS grid reference: TM218208
- District: Tendring
- Shire county: Essex
- Region: East
- Country: England
- Sovereign state: United Kingdom
- Post town: FRINTON-ON-SEA
- Postcode district: CO13
- Police: Essex
- Fire: Essex
- Ambulance: East of England
- UK Parliament: Clacton

Kirby Cross is a village in Tendring district, Essex, England. It is situated near to Kirby-le-Soken and Frinton-on-Sea. Historically, Kirby Cross was a hamlet within the parish of Kirby-le-Soken, but since 1934 both settlements have been part of Frinton and Walton civil parish.

It is the location of Kirby Cross railway station on the Sunshine Coast branch of the Great Eastern Main Line.
