= The Sokens =

Coordinates: 51.8602°N 1.2191°E

The Sokens is a name often used to describe the area containing the traditional parishes of Thorpe, Kirby and Walton, which now lie in Tendring district in the Naze area of northeast Essex. The significance of this grouping is now mostly historical. The name 'Soken' is derived from the Saxon 'soc' or 'soca', signifying immunity, peculiar privileges and jurisdiction. It refers in particular to the power to administer justice within itself, and likewise the circuit within which such power was exercised. Among others was the claim that no bailiff except the lord's bailiff could arrest any person within the parish.

== History ==
Thorpe, Kirby and Walton once made up the ancient manor of Adulvesnasa. This name probably refers to the promontory or Naze where Walton now lies, and may denote a former landowner. The Domesday Book states that, in 1066, the manor was owned by the Dean and Chapter of St. Paul's in London, and was assessed at 27 hides. It may have been granted to them by King Athelstan. The manor was held directly of the King, forming a peculiar jurisdiction or soke. The first indication of subdivision into three dependent manors comes in 1150.

The Chapter retained the area until 1544, when it was exchanged with the Crown for other estates. In 1551 the manorial rights were granted by the young King Edward VI to Thomas Darcy, Baron Darcy of Chiche. The manor descended with the Barons Darcy and earls of Rochford, until being sold by the fourth earl to Richard Rigby in 1775 to pay debts. Since then, the rights have been sold numerous times.

The Sokens formed a peculiar jurisdiction within the Church of England, with its own ecclesiastical court under the responsibility of a commissary appointed by the lord of the manor. This court dealt with a range of matters that has lessened over time. In earlier years it would have included dealing with disciplinary offences such as adultery, fornication and drunkenness. In later years it was limited to more administrative matters such as the proving of wills and granting of marriage licences. (In neighbouring parishes, this business would have been conducted in the court of the Archdeacon of Colchester.) Much of the soken court's business was taken away by the Probate and Matrimonial Causes acts of 1857. From the 16th century onwards, the court generally sat in Thorpe church. The last session was held in 1861. The last commissary was William Burgess, in office from 1823-1862. He was also vicar of all three parishes. Manorial courts continued for a few decades more, until the late 19th century.
