= Clacton Town Hall =

Municipal building in Clacton, Essex, England

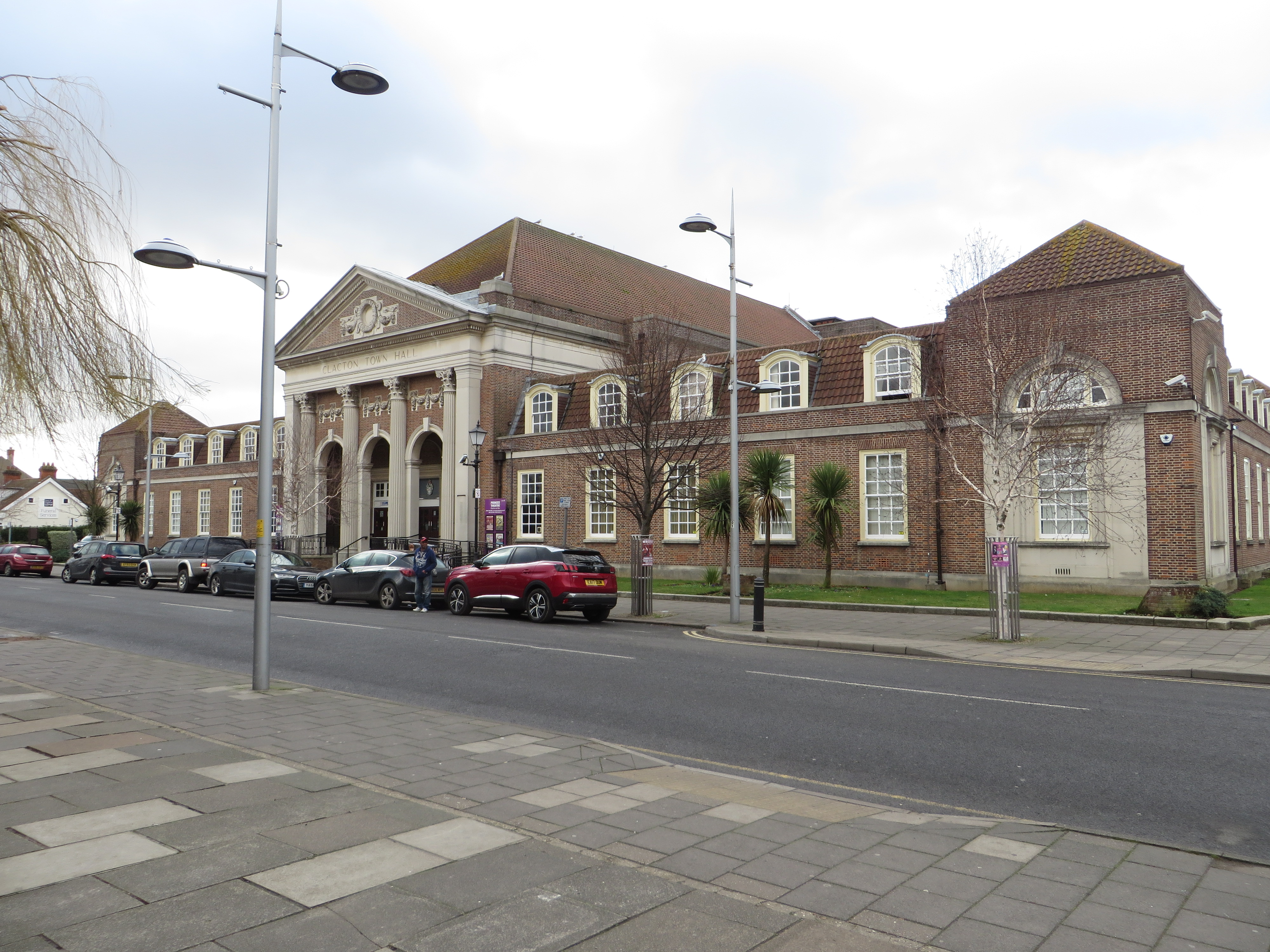
- Clacton Town Hall

- Shown in Essex
- 51.7920°N 1.1534°E
- Location: Station Road, Clacton-on-Sea

History
- Built: 1931

Site notes
- Architect: Sir Alfred Brumwell Thomas
- Architectural style: Neo-Georgian style

Listed Building – Grade II
- Official name: Clacton Town Hall
- Designated: 19 November 1996
- Reference no.: 1267903

Clacton Town Hall is a municipal building in Station Road, Clacton-on-Sea, Essex, England. The town hall, which is the headquarters of Tendring District Council, is a Grade II listed building.

== History ==
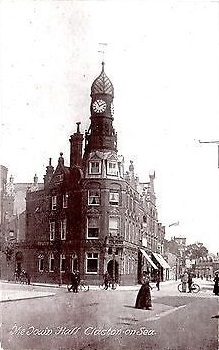
The old Town hall on the corner of Rosemary Road and the High Street

Following population growth, largely associated with the tourism industry, Clacton-on-Sea was designated an urban district in 1894. The new council established its offices on the first floor of a building on the corner of Rosemary Road and the High Street, which had been designed in the Victorian style and completed in 1894. The ground floor was occupied by a bank and there was a theatre known as the Operetta House at the back of the building.

In the early 1920s, civic leaders decided to procure a dedicated town hall: the site they selected on the west side of Station Road had been occupied by a potato field. Two former army buildings were acquired in an adjacent field in 1923 for use as temporary council offices while preparatory work was put underway. Construction of the new building started in 1928. It was designed by Sir Alfred Brumwell Thomas in the Neo-Georgian style, was built in brown brick with stone dressings and was officially opened by Prince Arthur of Connaught on 14 April 1931.

The design of the new building involved a symmetrical main frontage with fifteen bays facing onto the Station Road; the central section of three bays, which slightly projected forward, featured a full-height tetrastyle portico with composite order columns flanked by Doric order piers supporting an entablature bearing the words "Clacton Town Hall" and a pediment above. The carvings in the tympanum consisted of a wreath flanked by a pair of swags. There were three archways with keystones behind the portico, each with a carved swag above. The design of the two wings, each of six bays, involved end bays which slightly projected forward as pavilions and featured sash windows on the ground floor with Diocletian windows above. The other bays in the wings contained sash windows on the ground floor and dormer windows at attic level. Internally, the principal rooms included a theatre, known as the Princes Theatre in honour of Prince Arthur, with a proscenium arch at the rear of the building; the other main rooms included the council chamber in the south wing and the library in the north wing.

The town hall continued to serve as the local seat of government after the enlarged Tendring District Council was formed in 1974. The 21st century saw the theatre becoming an approved venue for weddings and civil partnerships. It also became a professional boxing venue in 2019, after an interval of some 80 years, and was declared Venue of the Year by the British and Irish Boxing Authority in January 2020. In January 2021, planning consent was given for the council to restore one of the main committee rooms, which had been used in recent years as a Housing Department reception area.

Works of art in the town hall include a painting by the artist, Lodewijk Johannes Kleijn, depicting a Dutch skating scene.
