= Frank Paton =

English painter

- Born: 23 November 1855; Stepney, London, United Kingdom
- Died: 13 November 1909 (aged 54); Walton-on-the-Naze, Essex, United Kingdom
- Known for: Painting, illustrator,
- Notable work: Puss in Boots, Fairest of Them All.
- Awards: Royal Academy

Frank Paton (23 November 1855 – 13 November 1909) was an English artist of the Victorian and Edwardian eras, best known for his paintings of animals and scenes of rural life. He was a successful artist during his lifetime and could even count Queen Victoria as an admirer of his work. His most famous compositions, "Fairest of Them All" and "Puss in Boots" (1880), still sell as collectibles today in various forms, including canvas, posters and plates. His series of printed Christmas cards published between 1880 and 1909 have also become collectibles.

== Biography ==
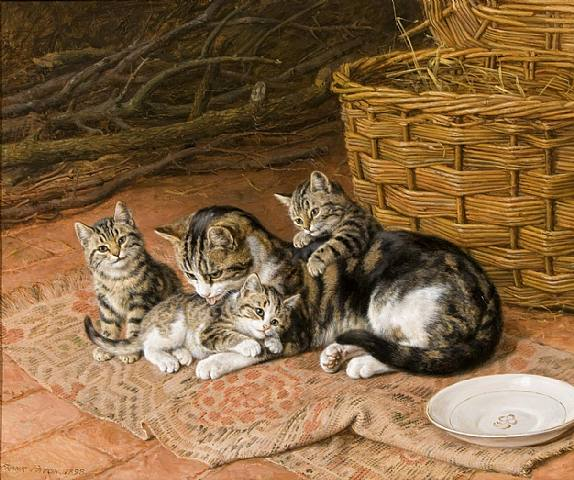
A Proud Mother

Frank Paton was born on 23 November 1855 in Stepney, London, England. His parents were James Paton and Mary Ann Paton (née Ross) and he was the youngest of their seven children. Although Stepney, in the East End of London, was a stronghold for the Paton family, Frank Paton grew up in and around Gravesend, Kent as his father was a maritime pilot (Gravesend, at the mouth of the river Thames, was a pilot station for the port of London).

Unlike his brothers, the majority of whom entered the Merchant Navy, Frank Paton showed an early talent for drawing animals and was allowed to follow his artistic bent. His first known exhibition was at the age of sixteen, the piece being a portrait of a German peasant girl. Family rumour has it that Paton briefly spent time in France working in stained glass before being recalled by his father. It is believed that he then travelled to, and made a living in, Australia. Paton had relatives in Australia - an Uncle and Aunt had emigrated there from London in the 1850s and settled in Williamstown, Victoria - so this is plausible and Australian immigration records of the time show that a Frank Paton, aged 19, an unassisted passenger on the "Shannon" from London, arrived in Melbourne in September 1875.

If Paton did spend time in Australia then it is unclear for how long. What is certain, however, is that he was in England during 1878 as this was the year that his painting "You Are No Chicken" - a modest sized oil on panel featuring two chicks staring at a frog - was accepted by the Royal Academy for exhibition. It was to be a turning point in the young artist's career as the work was purchased by Edward Ernest Leggatt. Although only the same age as Paton, Leggatt was already running a print and art dealership from a Fenchurch Street address in London. You Are No Chicken was engraved in mezzotint by J B Pratt in 1880. Its commercial success cemented a lifelong association with Leggatt, who became the main publisher of Frank Paton's work.

In April 1881 Frank Paton married Mary Sophia Edwards (1852–1929), with the artist Basil Holmes (c.1825 - 1902) bearing witness to the union. Mary, known as 'Marian' within the family, was from Winterborne Houghton in Dorset. She was brought up from an early age by Basil Holmes and his wife Lydia, who was Mary's maternal aunt. Most likely under the tutorage of Basil Holmes, Mary became a talented, amateur artist in her own right as is evident from a pair of etchings by her own hand: "Old Inn Chigwell" and "A Glade near Woodford".

After marrying, Frank Paton mainly lived in rural communities in Kent and in Essex. He divided his time between London and the countryside, accepting commissions for animal portraits from their owners. He was a good family man and raised four sons and three daughters with his wife. Of these, his second eldest son Basil and youngest daughter Dorothy showed considerable artistic talent (the latter becoming a commercial artist and occasionally exhibiting works in public).

Although never a member of the Royal Academy, a total of 20 works by Paton were exhibited at their annual selling exhibition between the years 1878 and 1890. Art dealer and collector Edward Ernest Leggatt published a series of Paton's etched Christmas cards annually from 1880 until Paton's death in 1909. The cards were intended to be a cut above the average Christmas card and sold for half a guinea each. Their format became formulaic over the years. A central subject reflecting the title of the print was usually complemented by a series of often humorous sketches around its border. A number of the prints would be sent from the printers to be signed in pencil by Paton.

From 1890 Frank Paton no longer exhibited at the Royal Academy following a dispute with the organisers. His reputation firmly established, it was of little consequence and the artist continued to work until his final days. At the time of his death Paton was living in Walton-on-the-Naze, Essex. During the summer of 1909 the family had moved to a new house, which was undergoing alterations and repairs. Paton spent the day of 12 November 1909 discussing and supervising the works with his builder and then in the evening, at around 11.30, suffered a heart attack. Although a doctor was called, Frank Paton died from heart failure at around 5.30 am on 13 November 1909, just 10 days short of his 54th birthday. In 1919 Edward E. Leggatt donated a full set of copies of Frank Paton's prints to the British Museum. In the inside cover of the Museum's portfolio of the artist is an anonymous tribute to Paton, written shortly after his death. Frank Paton is described as, "A kindly, modest, unassuming man with a rare fund of humour, which is reflected in his etchings. He leaves a large circle of friends and admirers to mourn his untimely and terribly sudden death." Fittingly, Paton's last ever Christmas card was called "The End of the Day".

== Christmas cards by Frank Paton ==
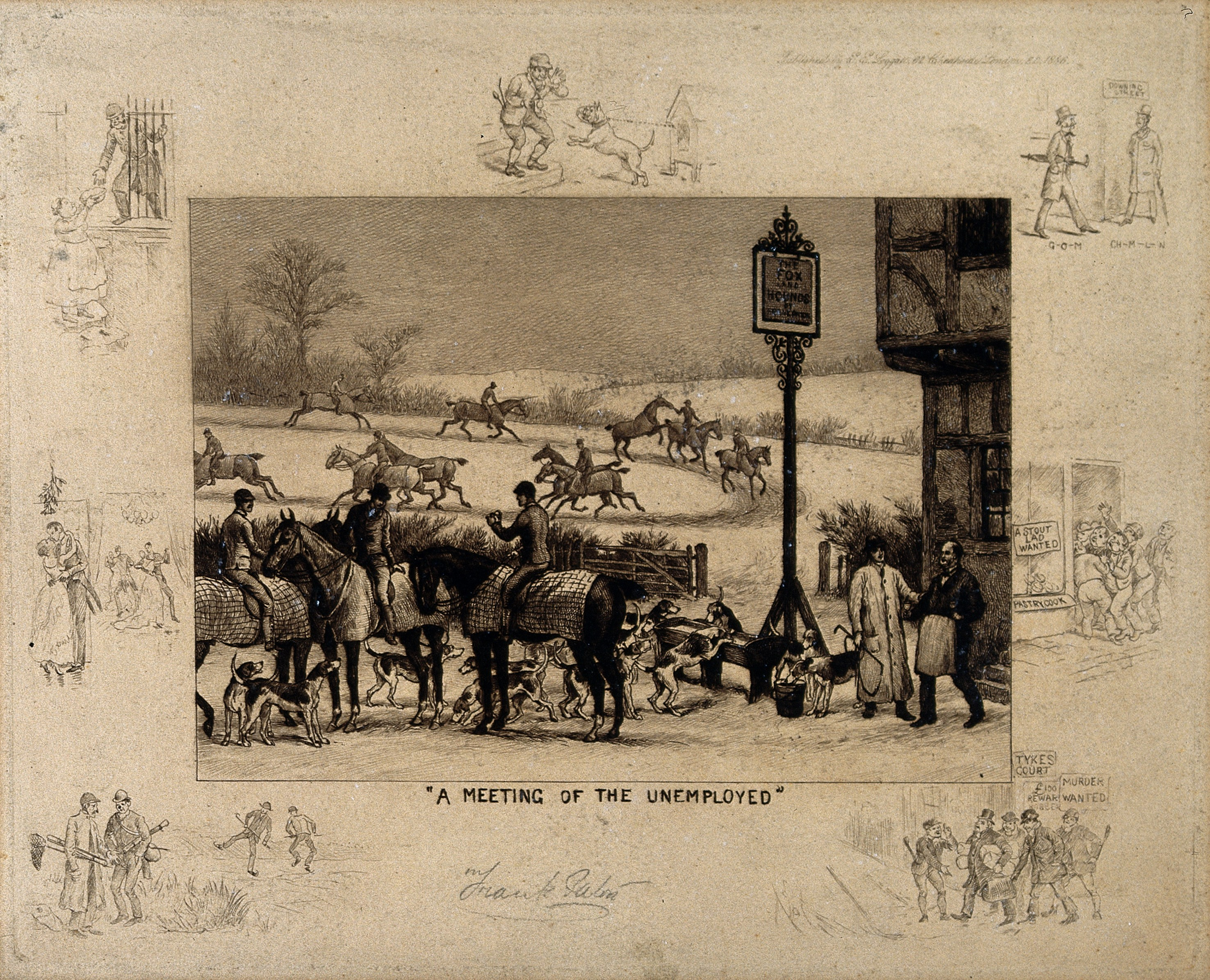
"A meeting of the unemployed" 1886 Christmas card by Frank Paton

1880 Xmas card
1881 Xmas card
1882 Xmas card
1883 Xmas card
1884 Cheapside - E.E. Leggatt's New Shop
1884 Xmas card
1885 Xmas card
1886 Meeting of Unemployed
1887 Not at Home
1888 Round and Ready
1889 The Good Old Days
1890 Every Dog Has Its Day
1891 Notice To Quit
1892 The Pleasures of Hope
1893 Out of the Hunt
1894 Royal and Ancient (St Andrews)
1895 The Ordeal by Fire
1896 Recollections of a Record Reign
1897 Gone Away
1898 Our Grandfathers' Hobbies
1899 British Interests
1900 Coming Events Cast their Shadows Before
1901 Dy’e Ken John Peel
1902 A Deep Dream of Peace (Leigh Hunt)
1904 Hunting Incidents
1905 Are You There
1906 Gun Fire "A Good Start"
1907 Eight Above the Line
1908 The World Went Very Well Then (Xmas)
1909 The End of the Day (signed on the day he died)

From a book of Christmas Cards by Frank Paton, held at the British Museum.

== Original etchings by Frank Paton ==
After Thomas Blinks
After G. S . Kilburne
After C. E. Brock
Fishing and Shooting, after Charles Whymper
After N. H. Baird
After J Yates Carrington
After A. A. Davis
After A. W. Holder
After L. B. Hurt
After A. Thornton
After S. E. Waller

From the British Museum's portfolio of Frank Paton.

== Works exhibited by the Royal Academy ==
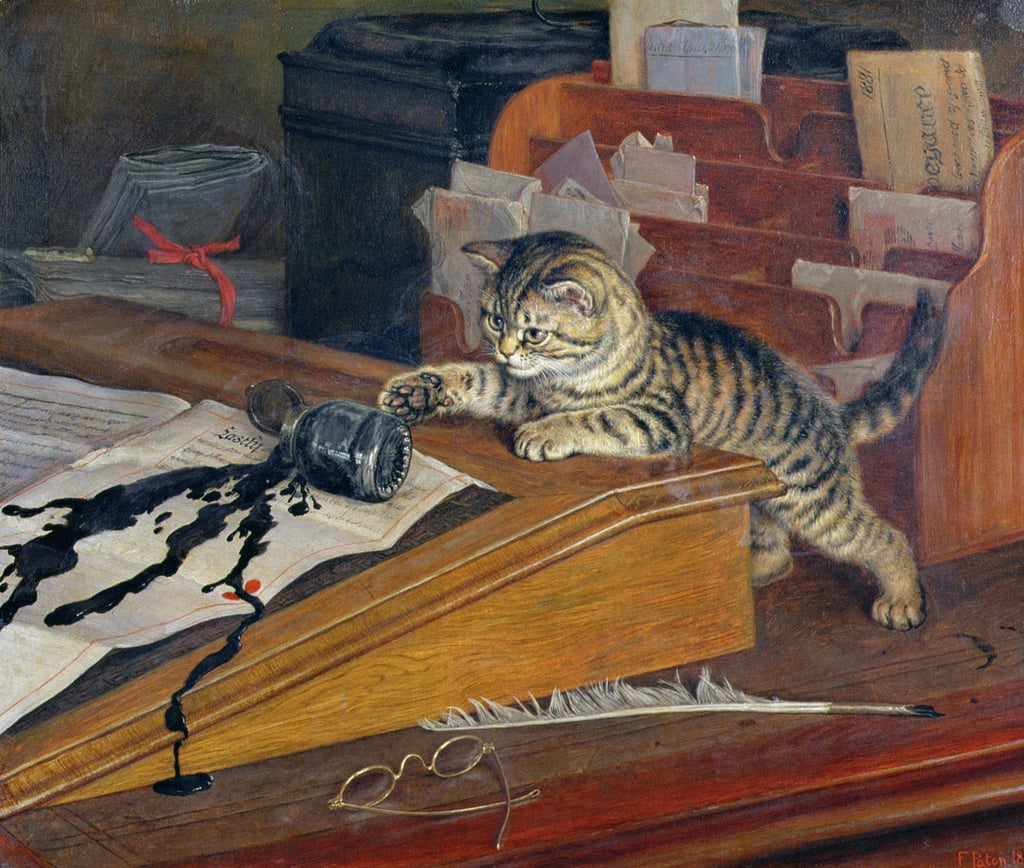
Witness my Act and Deed (1882)

- 1878 You are no chicken (139)
- 1880 Puss in boots (475)
- 1881 Winter quarters (570); Babes in "The Wood" (958)
- 1882 Little Milksops (461); "Witness my act and deed" (1495); Both Parent and Guardian (1504)
- 1883 England, Scotland, and Ireland - bull dog, collie, and pure Irish terrier (614); The cat's-cradle (822)
- 1884 More free than welcome (427); Rough and ready (441); Their first lesson (692)
- 1886 Opening the ball (93); Greed (1419); Tree'd (1429)
- 1887 Not at home (314)
- 1888 A happy family (231); Ploughing (614)
- 1890 Washing day (1080); A happy family (1095)

Information provided by the Royal Academy.
