= Little Clacton =

Village in Essex, England

Coordinates: 51°49′N 1°08′E

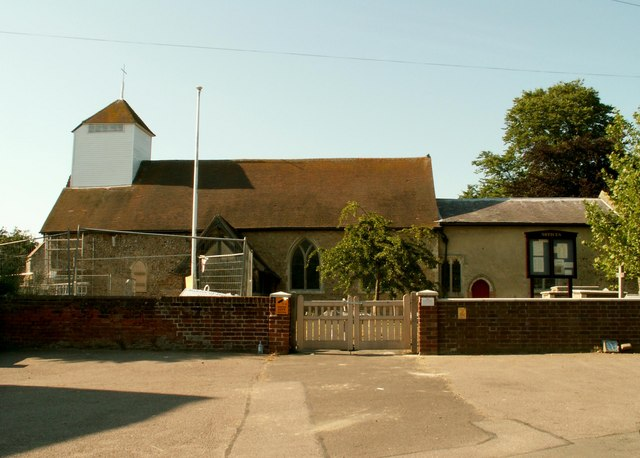
- St. James' church, Little Clacton

- Location within Essex
- Population: 3,065 (Parish, 2021)
- Civil parish: Little Clacton
- District: Tendring
- Shire county: Essex
- Region: East
- Country: England
- Sovereign state: United Kingdom
- Post town: CLACTON-ON-SEA
- Postcode district: CO16
- Dialling code: 01255
- UK Parliament: Clacton

Little Clacton is a village and civil parish in the Tendring district of Essex, England. At the 2021 census the parish had a population of 3,065.

== Toponymy ==
The name "Clacton" is Old English, and indicates the enclosure, farmstead or village of "Clacc"; the word Clacc may mean a hill (although this area is very flat) or it may have been a person's name. The "Little" distinguishes it from Great Clacton, the adjoining parish to the south, in which the modern town of Clacton-on-Sea developed from the late 19th century.

== Village ==
It is located on the Tendring Peninsula, close to Clacton-on-Sea. The population of the parish at the 2011 census was 2,822.

The village is approximately 12 miles south-east of Colchester and 2.5 miles north of Clacton-on-Sea, and is also close to Thorpe-le-Soken, with its railway station providing direct links to London Liverpool Street and Clacton-on-Sea.

The parish church is an early twelfth century Norman church building dedicated to St James. It has three bells in its tower, including one cast by Robert Crouch and dating from 1437.

== Governance ==
Little Clacton forms part of the electoral ward called Little Clacton and Weeley. The population of this ward at the 2011 census was 4,590.

== Local towns and villages ==
Weeley, Weeley Heath, Thorpe-le-Soken, Frinton-on-Sea, Great Holland, Clacton-on-Sea, Jaywick, Kirby-le-Soken.
