= Tendring =

Village in Essex, England

Coordinates: 51.874080°N 1.112512°E

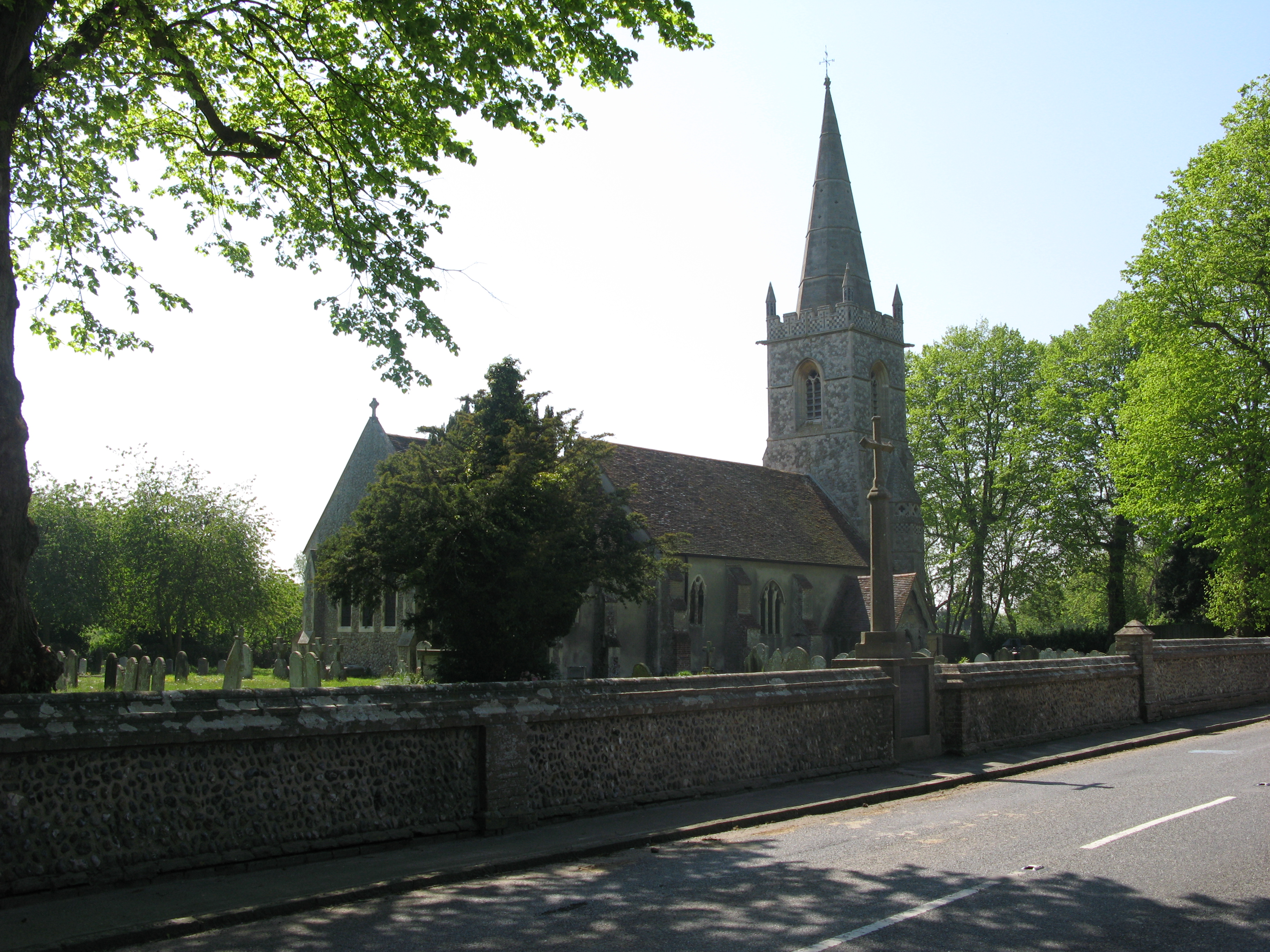

- Location within Essex
- Population: 748 (Parish, 2021)
- OS grid reference: TM144241
- Civil parish: Tendring
- District: Tendring
- Shire county: Essex
- Region: East
- Country: England
- Sovereign state: United Kingdom
- Post town: CLACTON-ON-SEA
- Postcode district: CO16
- UK Parliament: Clacton

Tendring is a village and civil parish in Essex. It gives its name to the Tendring District and before that Tendring Rural District and before that the Tendring Hundred. Its name was given to the larger groupings because it was at the centre, not because it was larger than the other settlements. At the 2021 census the parish had a population of 748.

The 1086 Domesday Book records the name as Tenderinga and in 1242 the Pipe Rolls mention it as Terring.

The linear village straddles the B1035 from Manningtree to Thorpe-le-Soken.

The parish includes the settlements of Goose Green, Tendring Green and Tendring Heath. The church is dedicated to St Edmund. The Tendring Union Workhouse was located at Tendring Heath. In 1948 the workhouse was converted into an NHS geriatric hospital, which closed in the 1980s.

== Transport ==
The village is on the B1035 road and close to the A120 road. There are bus services to Clacton-on-Sea and Colchester.
