= Clacton (constituency) =

UK Parliament constituency (since 2010)

Coordinates: 51.83°N 1.15°E

- County constituency for the House of Commons
- Interactive map of boundaries since 2024
- Location within the East of England
- County: Essex
- Population: 85,359 (2011 census)
- Electorate: 75,959 (March 2020)
- Major settlements: Clacton-on-Sea, Frinton-on-Sea and Walton-on-the-Naze

Current constituency
- Created: 2010
- Member of Parliament: Nigel Farage (Reform UK)
- Seats: One
- Created from: Harwich

Clacton is a constituency in Essex, England, that has been represented in the House of Commons of the UK Parliament by Nigel Farage, the leader of Reform UK, since winning a by-election in August 2026, having previously held the seat from 2024 to July 2026. It is centred on and named after the seaside town of Clacton-on-Sea.

== Constituency profile ==
Clacton is almost completely coastal, comprising seaside resorts along the Tendring peninsula, including Clacton-on-Sea, Frinton-on-Sea and Walton-on-the-Naze. It shares an inland boundary with just one constituency – Harwich and North Essex.

Similar to other coastal seats, such as Christchurch in Dorset, Clacton's electorate comprises among the oldest in the country with a high proportion of retirees and few non-white residents. The area has experienced a considerable influx of White British families from multicultural areas of East London such as Barking and Dagenham, leading to the town of Clacton becoming known as "Little Dagenham".

The village of Jaywick was, in the consecutive indices of deprivation in 2010, 2015, 2019 and 2025, identified as the single most deprived neighbourhood (Note: Neighbourhood refers to a Lower Layer Super Output Area (LSOA) in the GSS coding system) in England, out of around 32,000, with unemployment estimated at almost 50%. Many homes are essentially beach huts and lack basic amenities. In 2018, Jaywick was visited by the United Nations special rapporteur for poverty Philip Alston as part of his examination into the causes of extreme poverty. Jaywick was named the most deprived place in the UK for the third consecutive year in 2019.

According to the 2021 UK Census, 96.1% of the population are White, 1.3% Asian, 0.6% Black, 0.4% other ethnic groups, and 1.6% multiple ethnic groups. 5.1% were born outside of the UK. The religious composition of the constituency is 50.4% Christian, 41.9% no religion, and 7.7% other.

Electoral Calculus categorises the seat as being part of the "Strong Right" demographic, those who have fiscally conservative views on the economy but are also fairly nationalist and socially conservative, alongside strong support for Brexit. Clacton is also, in general, highly deprived, in terms of employment, income and education, when measured comparatively with the rest of the UK, with 64% of the constituency being impoverished, according to the site. In addition to this, the latest government labour data has also revealed that economic inactivity in Clacton is at 46.8% – more than twice the 21.7% UK average.

== History ==
In ancient times the area was under the jurisdiction of the Bishop of Rochester in Essex. Part of the Petre estates, the seat of Clacton was established for the 2010 general election following a review of parliamentary representation of Essex by the Boundary Commission for England. It was formed out of the abolished Harwich constituency, excluding the town of Harwich itself and surrounding areas.

The constituency's Member of Parliament until 3 May 2017 was Douglas Carswell, who had previously sat for the Harwich constituency since gaining that seat for the Conservatives in 2005.

On 28 August 2014, Carswell announced his defection to UKIP. Although not required to seek re-election following a change of party allegiance, Carswell triggered a by-election, held on 9 October 2014, in which he stood as the UKIP candidate and was elected as the party's first MP. The then UKIP leader Nigel Farage declared that the result in Clacton had "shaken up British politics". Carswell retained the seat for UKIP at the 2015 general election, seeing his majority cut by roughly three-quarters, with an 11% swing to the Conservatives. Carswell then became UKIP's sole MP in the House of Commons, as Mark Reckless, a fellow Conservative defector, lost his seat.

On 25 March 2017, Carswell announced on his blog that he was quitting UKIP to sit as an independent MP, saying that "I switched to UKIP because I desperately wanted us to leave the EU. Now we can be certain that that is going to happen, I have decided that I will be leaving UKIP".

After Prime Minister Theresa May called a snap election on 19 April 2017, Carswell announced that he would not stand for re-election and endorsed the Conservative Party candidate Giles Watling. Watling was elected at the 2017 general election; at that election, UKIP's share of the vote fell by 36.8%, one of its largest declines in the country, and the subsequent Conservative victory in Clacton marked the first time every constituency in Essex had returned a Conservative MP since 1987. In 2019, Giles Watling won re-election on the back of a majority of 24,702, increasing his vote share by 11.1% from 2017.

Ahead of the 2024 general election, it was announced that Nigel Farage, who had taken over as leader of Reform UK mid-campaign, would contest the Clacton constituency. A YouGov poll published on 19 June 2024 (using the MRP technique) predicted that Farage would defeat Watling. Farage won the seat with 46.2% of the vote, a swing of 45.1% from the Conservative Party.

In July 2026, Farage announced his intention to vacate his seat to trigger a by-election in which he intended to stand. All other major parties decided to boycott the by-election waiting for the results of a parliamentary standards inquiry into Farage's finances, including a £5 million donation he received from Christopher Harborne. The chancellor announced on 8 July 2026 that Farage's resignation had been accepted. Farage won the by-election for Reform with 63% of the vote.

== Boundaries ==
=== 2010–2024 ===
Map of boundaries 2010–2024

The District of Tendring wards of Alton Park, Beaumont and Thorpe, Bockings Elm, Burrsville, Frinton, Golf Green, Hamford, Haven, Holland and Kirby, Homelands, Little Clacton and Weeley, Pier, Rush Green, St Bartholomews, St James, St Johns, St Marys, St Osyth and Point Clear, St Pauls and Walton.

The new seat consisted essentially of the former Harwich constituency, minus the town of Harwich itself and a few nearby villages, plus St Osyth and Weeley, transferred from the abolished North Essex constituency.

=== Current ===
Following the 2023 review of Westminster constituencies, which came into effect for the 2024 general election, the composition of the constituency is as follows (as they existed on 1 December 2020):

- The District of Tendring wards of: Bluehouse; Burrsville; Cann Hall; Coppins; Eastcliff; Frinton; Homelands; Kirby Cross; Kirby-le-Soken & Hamford; Little Clacton; Pier; St. Bartholomew's; St. James; St. John's; St Osyth; St. Paul's; The Bentleys & Frating; The Oakleys & Wix; Thorpe, Beaumont & Great Holland; Walton; Weeley & Tendring; West Clacton & Jaywick Sands.

The revised contents were expanded slightly by the addition of some inland rural areas and villages, transferred from Harwich and North Essex.

== Members of Parliament ==
Election	Member	Party
2010	Douglas Carswell	Conservative
2014 by-election	Douglas Carswell	UKIP
2017	Douglas Carswell	Independent
2017	Giles Watling	Conservative
2019	Giles Watling	Conservative
2024	Nigel Farage	Reform UK
2026 by-election	Nigel Farage	Reform UK

== Elections ==
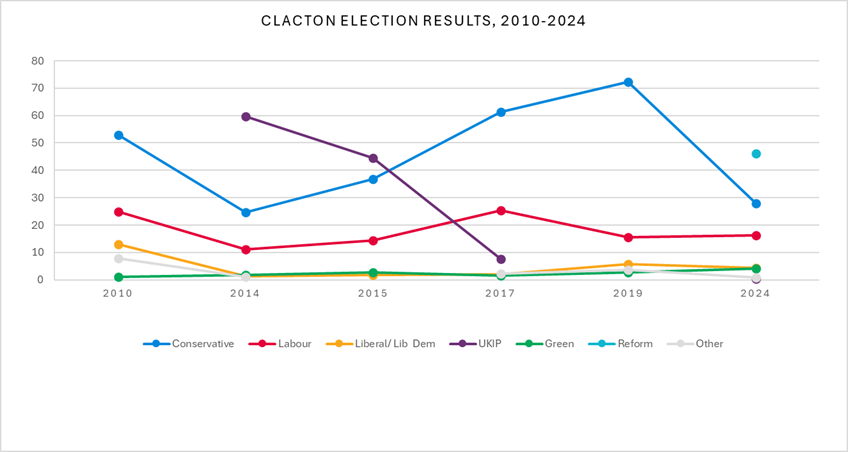
Clacton election results 2010–2024

=== Elections in the 2020s ===
2026 Clacton by-election
Party	Candidate	Votes	%	±%
Reform	Nigel Farage	22,239	63.34	+17.16
Binface	Count Binface	9,455	26.93	N/A
Rejoin EU	John Stevens	492	1.40	N/A
Independent	Tony Francis	432	1.23	N/A
Independent	Pamela Walford	371	1.06	N/A
Reclaim	Laurence Fox	347	0.99	N/A
SDP	William Clouston	256	0.73	N/A
Independent	Nick Pelas	202	0.58	N/A
Consensus	James Ransley	192	0.55	N/A
Independent	Stephen Ingram	159	0.45	N/A
British Democratic	Kai Stephens	132	0.38	N/A
Independent	Attieh Fard	126	0.36	N/A
Independent	Derrick Morris	100	0.28	N/A
Independent	Martyn Obrien	65	0.19	N/A
Freedom Alliance	Martin Davies	60	0.17	N/A
Independent	Robin Green	59	0.17	N/A
Independent	Rees Cowne	50	0.14	N/A
Forward	Adham Alkhatip	49	0.14	N/A
Independent	Amy Morris	46	0.13	N/A
Independent	Andy Erlam	44	0.13	N/A
Independent	Joseph 77	42	0.12	N/A
Monster Raving Loony	Nick The Incredible Flying Brick	28	0.08	N/A
UK Voice	Ketankumar Pipaliya	21	0.06	N/A
Independent	Michael O'Keeffe	19	0.05	N/A
Monster Raving Loony	Howling Laud Hope	18	0.05	N/A
Independent	Tony Cane	17	0.05	N/A
No description	Daniel Pocock	16	0.05	N/A
Monster Raving Loony	Baron Von Thunderclap	15	0.04	N/A
Independent	Abi Hookway	14	0.04	N/A
Independent	Marc Wilkinson	11	0.03	N/A
Everyone is God	Marcus White	10	0.03	N/A
Independent	Gerry Smith	9	0.03	N/A
Independent	Woke Trump Carrzee	8	0.02	N/A
Independent	Glenn Cummings	7	0.02	N/A
Majority		12,784	36.41	+18.13
Turnout		35,111	44.01	−14.73
Rejected ballots		280	0.79	+0.55
Registered electors		79,785		
Reform hold		Swing	N/A	

General election 2024: Clacton
Party	Candidate	Votes	%	±%
Reform	Nigel Farage	21,225	46.2	N/A
Conservative	Giles Watling	12,820	27.9	−44.0
Labour	Jovan Owusu-Nepaul	7,448	16.2	+0.6
Liberal Democrats	Matthew Bensilum	2,016	4.4	−1.8
Green	Natasha Osben	1,935	4.2	+1.3
Independent	Tony Mack (Note: Mack was originally announced as the Reform UK candidate, but was de-selected in favour of Nigel Farage, and subsequently ran as an independent.)	317	0.7	N/A
UKIP	Andrew Pemberton	116	0.3	N/A
Climate	Craig Jamieson	48	0.1	N/A
Heritage	Tasos Papanastasiou	33	0.1	N/A
Majority		8,405	18.3	
Turnout		45,958	58.7	−2.6
Rejected ballots		111	0.2	
Registered electors		78,245		
Reform gain from Conservative		Swing	+45.1	

=== Elections in the 2010s ===
2019 notional result
Party	Vote	%
Conservative	32,825	71.9
Labour	7,108	15.6
Liberal Democrats	2,829	6.2
Green	1,341	2.9
Others	1,566	3.4
Turnout	45,669	60.1
Electorate	75,959	

General election 2019: Clacton
Party	Candidate	Votes	%	±%
Conservative	Giles Watling	31,438	72.3	+11.1
Labour	Kevin Bonavia	6,736	15.5	−9.9
Liberal Democrats	Callum Robertson	2,541	5.8	+3.8
Green	Chris Southall	1,225	2.8	+1.2
Independent	Andy Morgan	1,099	2.5	N/A
Independent	Colin Bennett	243	0.6	N/A
Monster Raving Loony	Just-John Sexton	224	0.5	N/A
Majority		24,702	56.8	+21.0
Turnout		43,506	61.3	−2.4
Conservative hold		Swing	+10.5	

General election 2017: Clacton
Party	Candidate	Votes	%	±%
Conservative	Giles Watling	27,031	61.2	+24.5
Labour	Natasha Osben	11,203	25.4	+11.0
UKIP	Paul Oakley	3,357	7.6	−36.8
Liberal Democrats	David Grace	887	2.0	+0.2
Green	Chris Southall	719	1.6	−1.1
Independent	Caroline Shearer	449	1.0	N/A
English Democrat	Robin Tilbrook	289	0.7	N/A
Independent	Nick Martin	210	0.5	N/A
Majority		15,828	35.8	
Turnout		44,145	63.7	−0.4
Conservative gain from UKIP		Swing	+30.7	

General election 2015: Clacton
Party	Candidate	Votes	%	±%
UKIP	Douglas Carswell	19,642	44.4	−15.3
Conservative	Giles Watling	16,205	36.7	−16.3
Labour	Tim Young	6,364	14.4	−10.6
Green	Chris Southall	1,184	2.7	+1.5
Liberal Democrats	David Grace	812	1.8	−11.1
Majority		3,437	7.7	
Turnout		44,207	64.1	−0.1
UKIP hold		Swing	+50.7	

By-election 2014: Clacton
Party	Candidate	Votes	%	±%
UKIP	Douglas Carswell	21,113	59.7	N/A
Conservative	Giles Watling	8,709	24.6	−28.4
Labour	Tim Young	3,957	11.2	−13.8
Green	Chris Southall	688	1.9	+0.7
Liberal Democrats	Andy Graham	483	1.3	−11.6
Independent	Bruce Sizer	205	0.6	N/A
Monster Raving Loony	Alan "Howling Laud" Hope	127	0.4	N/A
Independent	Charlotte Rose	56	0.2	N/A
Majority		12,404	35.1	
Turnout		35,338	51.2	−13.0
UKIP gain from Conservative		Swing	+44.1	

General election 2010: Clacton
Party	Candidate	Votes	%	±%
Conservative	Douglas Carswell	22,867	53.0	+8.6
Labour	Ivan Henderson	10,799	25.0	–10.9
Liberal Democrats	Michael Green	5,577	12.9	–0.6
BNP	Jim Taylor	1,975	4.6	N/A
Tendring First	Terry Allen	1,078	2.5	N/A
Green	Chris Southall	535	1.2	N/A
Independent	Chris Humphrey	292	0.7	N/A
Majority		12,068	28.0	+19.5
Turnout		43,123	64.2	+1.6
Conservative hold		Swing	+9.7	

2005 notional result
Party	Vote	%
Conservative	20,035	46.6
Labour	14,219	33.1
Liberal Democrats	6,059	14.1
Others	2,655	6.2
Turnout	42,968	62.9
Electorate	68,363	

== See also ==
- List of parliamentary constituencies in Essex
- See of Rochester
- Tendring District
- Vista Road Recreation Ground
