= Great Holland =

Village in Essex, England

Coordinates: 51°50′N 1°13′E

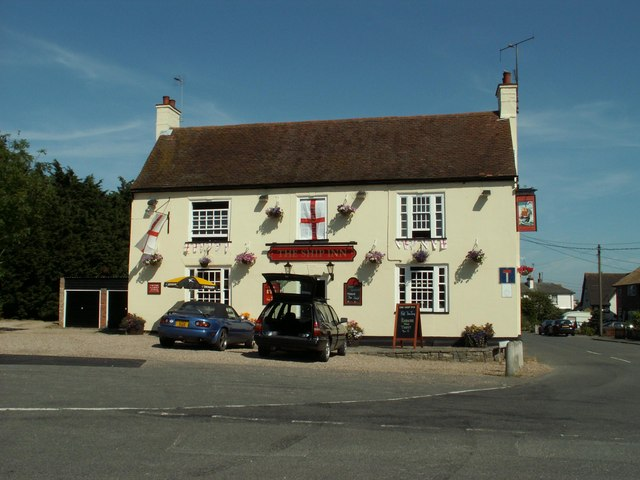
- The Ship Inn in Great Holland

- Location within Essex
- Population: 509 (Built up area, 2021)
- Civil parish: Frinton and Walton
- District: Tendring
- Shire county: Essex
- Region: East
- Country: England
- Sovereign state: United Kingdom
- Post town: FRINTON-ON-SEA
- Postcode district: CO13
- Dialling code: 01255

Great Holland is a village in the civil parish of Frinton and Walton, in the Tendring district of Essex, England. It is to the north-east of Holland-on-Sea, and west of Frinton-on-Sea. The village is served by a bus service to Clacton-on-Sea to the south and Kirby Cross, to the north. The village is served by two churches: a Methodist church and the Church of England parish church of All Saints. There is a community-owned pub called The Ship Inn. At the 2021 census the built up area as defined by the Office for National Statistics had a population of 509.

== History ==
Great Holland was an ancient parish in the Tendring hundred of Essex. The parish was abolished in 1934, when its area was merged with the neighbouring parish of Kirby-le-Soken and the two urban districts of Frinton-on-Sea and Walton-on-the-Naze to become a new urban district called Frinton and Walton. At the 1931 census (the last before the abolition of the civil parish), Great Holland had a population of 623.

== Notable residents ==
- Lilian Hicks, suffragette, lived here
- Amy Bull, a leader of the suffragettes, was born at Great Holland Hall in 1877.
