= Frinton and Walton =

Civil parish in Essex, England

- Civil parish
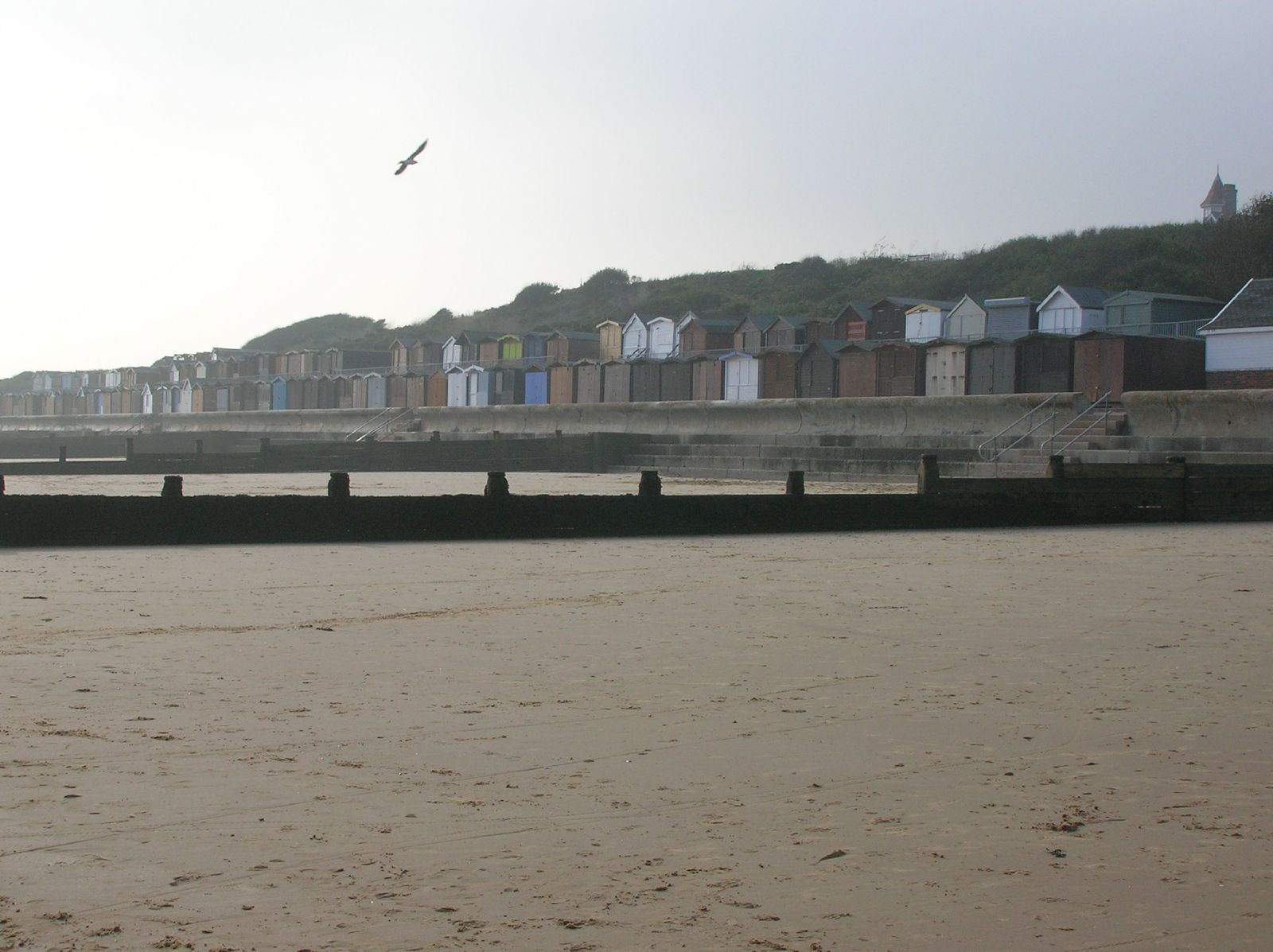
- Frinton-on-Sea
- Interactive map of Frinton and Walton
- Coordinates: 51°50′35″N 1°15′11″E
- Country: England
- Primary council: Tendring
- County: Essex
- Region: East of England
- Status: Town

Government
  - UK Parliament: Harwich

Population (Parish, 2021)
  - Total: 19,913
- Postal code: CO13
- Area code: CO
- Website: Frinton and Walton Town Council

Frinton and Walton is a civil parish in the Tendring district of Essex, England. It covers the two towns of Walton-on-the-Naze and Frinton-on-Sea and the villages of Great Holland, Kirby Cross, and Kirby-le-Soken. The parish also includes some rural areas, notably on The Naze headland to the north of Walton and around Great Holland to the south-west of the parish. At the 2021 census the parish had a population of 19,913.

== History ==
The parish has its origins in the Frinton and Walton Urban District, which was created in 1934 covering the combined area of the former urban districts of Frinton-on-Sea and Walton-on-the-Naze plus the two parishes of Great Holland and Kirby-le-Soken.

Frinton and Walton Urban District was abolished in 1974, becoming part of the new district of Tendring. A successor parish called Frinton and Walton was created covering the area of the former urban district, with its parish council taking the name Frinton and Walton Town Council.

== Governance ==
There are three tiers of local government covering Frinton and Walton, at parish (town), district, and county level: Frinton and Walton Town Council, Tendring District Council, and Essex County Council. The town council is based at the Council House in the Triangle Shopping Centre, in the suburbs of Frinton.
