= Walton-on-the-Naze =

Coastal town in Essex, England

Coordinates: 51.848°N 1.268°E

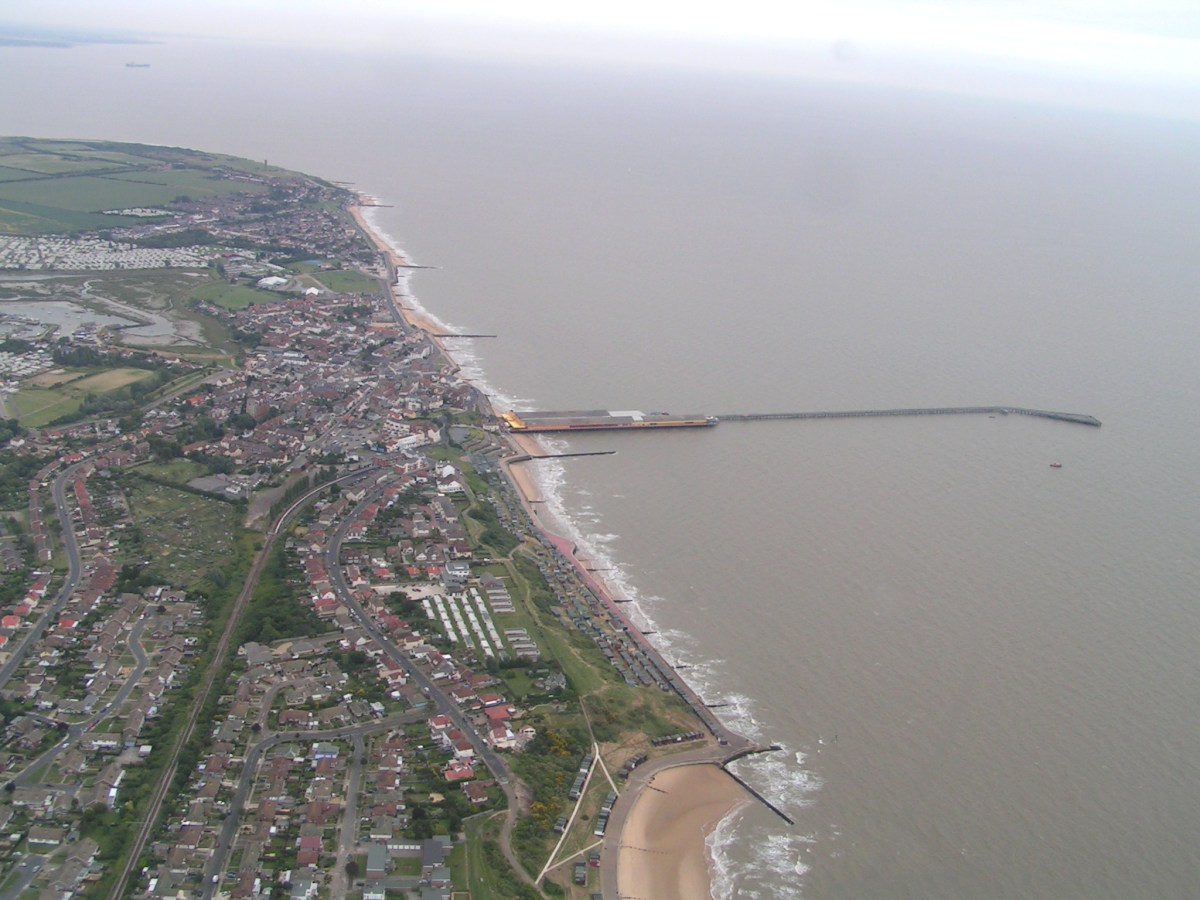
- Walton-on-the-Naze

- Location within Essex
- Population: 6,990 (Built up area, 2021)
- OS grid reference: TM246214
- Civil parish: Frinton and Walton
- District: Tendring
- Shire county: Essex
- Region: East
- Country: England
- Sovereign state: United Kingdom
- Post town: WALTON ON THE NAZE
- Postcode district: CO14
- Dialling code: 01255
- Police: Essex
- Fire: Essex
- Ambulance: East of England
- UK Parliament: Clacton

Walton-on-the-Naze is a seaside town in the civil parish of Frinton and Walton in the Tendring district of Essex, England. It lies on the North Sea coast, to the north of Clacton and south of the port of Harwich; Frinton-on-Sea immediately adjoins Walton to the south. The town attracts many visitors; The Naze and the pier are the main attractions. At the 2021 census, the Walton-on-the-Naze built up area as defined by the Office for National Statistics had a population of 6,990.

The parish was earlier known as Eadolfenaesse and then as Walton-le-Soken. The name Walton is a common one meaning a 'farmstead or village of the Britons', while 'Soken' denotes the soke (an area of special jurisdiction) that included Thorpe, Kirby and Walton, which were under the jurisdiction of the chapter of St Paul's Cathedral.

Walton had a HM Coastguard team and was home to the Thames MRCC (Maritime Rescue Coordination Centre), organising rescues from Southwold to Herne Bay. It closed in June 2015, as part of a Maritime and Coastguard Agency (MCA) modernisation programme, transferring its operations to a national centre in Fareham on the south coast. Walton-on-the-Naze railway station is on a branch of the Sunshine Coast Line. Along the coast there are many fossils to be found, some have been found to be up to 50 million years old. Rocks include red crag and London clay.

== The Naze ==
"Naze" derives from Old English næss "ness, promontory, headland". In 1722 Daniel Defoe mentions the town calling it "Walton, under the Nase".

The Naze is a peninsula north of the town. It is important for migrating birds and has a small nature reserve. The marshes of Hamford Water behind the town are also of ornithological interest, with wintering ducks and Brent geese. Many bird watchers visit at migration times.

The Hanoverian tower (more commonly known as the Naze Tower) at the start of the open area of the Naze was a sea mark to assist ships on this otherwise fairly featureless coast. It is now privately owned and open to visitors.

During the Second World War the Naze was home to a radar station, with some of its aerials mounted on the tower.

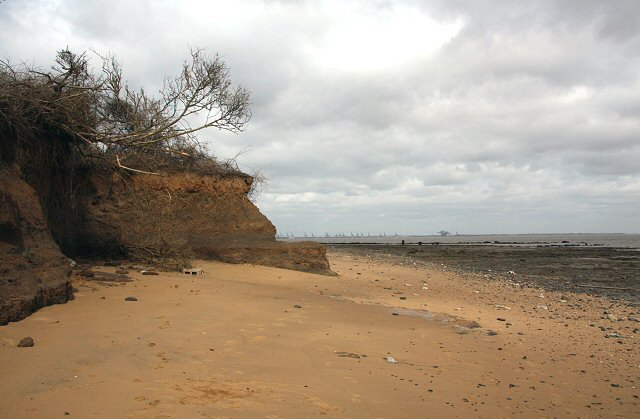
Cliff erosion, the overlying Red Crag deposit has eroded faster than the London clay base

Originally, Walton was a farming village situated miles inland. Over the centuries a large extent of land has been lost to the sea due to coastal erosion. The site of the medieval village of Walton now lies 9 mi (14 km) out to sea. The erosion caused the loss of Walton's medieval parish church, which remained in use until 22 July 1798; a regular Sunday service was held during the day but the building partially collapsed that night. The old church was abandoned and its site has since completely eroded away. A new church was built further inland, opening in 1804. The 1804 church was in turn rebuilt in 1873–1882. The 1798 loss of land to the sea is recorded on a Canon's stall in St Paul's Cathedral with the inscription Consumpta per Mare.

The Naze continues to erode rapidly (at about 2 metres per year), threatening the tower and wildlife. The Naze Protection Society was formed to campaign for erosion controls. The Naze has become popular for school fieldwork to investigate erosion and ways to protect the coast. Protection includes a sea wall, a riprap, groynes and a permeable groyne as well as drainage. Millions of tons of sand have been added to the beach to replenish it and stop the cliff eroding. However, the cliff near Naze Tower is greatly eroded. It is receding fast, and within 50 years Naze Tower may tumble into the sea like the pill boxes that can be seen on the beach.

The cliffs themselves are a Site of Special Scientific Interest (SSSI), the base of which is London Clay (54 million years old) which is overlaid with a 2-million-year-old sandy deposit of Red Crag. This sandy deposit contains many fossils including bivalve and gastropod shells, sharks' teeth and whale bones. The clay base is considered one of the best sites for pyritised fossils (mainly wood), and for bird bones (which are very rare); in 1998, David Attenborough estimated that over 600 specimens of bird fossil had been found at the site.

== Climate ==
Like the rest of the British Isles, Walton-on-the-Naze has an oceanic climate, with slightly more marine influence than nearby inland areas due to its position on the North Sea coast.

Climate data for Walton-on-the-Naze (1991–2020)
Month	Jan	Feb	Mar	Apr	May	Jun	Jul	Aug	Sep	Oct	Nov	Dec	Year
Record high °C (°F)	12.6 (54.7)	13.3 (55.9)	18.0 (64.4)	21.3 (70.3)	23.8 (74.8)	24.6 (76.3)	28.5 (83.3)	25.5 (77.9)	24.5 (76.1)	20.2 (68.4)	17.5 (63.5)	14.0 (57.2)	28.5 (83.3)
Mean daily maximum °C (°F)	7.0 (44.6)	7.9 (46.2)	10.1 (50.2)	12.1 (53.8)	15.7 (60.3)	18.8 (65.8)	21.5 (70.7)	21.0 (69.8)	18.8 (65.8)	15.0 (59.0)	10.9 (51.6)	7.9 (46.2)	13.9 (57.0)
Daily mean °C (°F)	4.5 (40.1)	5.3 (41.5)	6.9 (44.4)	9.1 (48.4)	12.4 (54.3)	15.4 (59.7)	18.3 (64.9)	17.8 (64.0)	15.5 (59.9)	12.3 (54.1)	8.4 (47.1)	5.4 (41.7)	11.0 (51.8)
Mean daily minimum °C (°F)	2.1 (35.8)	2.6 (36.7)	3.8 (38.8)	6.0 (42.8)	9.1 (48.4)	12.0 (53.6)	15.0 (59.0)	14.6 (58.3)	12.3 (54.1)	9.5 (49.1)	5.8 (42.4)	2.9 (37.2)	8.0 (46.4)
Record low °C (°F)	−10.0 (14.0)	−7.2 (19.0)	−6.5 (20.3)	−2.6 (27.3)	−0.5 (31.1)	5.6 (42.1)	5.3 (41.5)	7.1 (44.8)	5.0 (41.0)	0.8 (33.4)	−3.8 (25.2)	−6.1 (21.0)	−10.0 (14.0)
Average precipitation mm (inches)	48.2 (1.90)	45.9 (1.81)	35.3 (1.39)	33.3 (1.31)	30.6 (1.20)	36.9 (1.45)	48.7 (1.92)	58.5 (2.30)	49.4 (1.94)	54.6 (2.15)	60.4 (2.38)	53.9 (2.12)	555.8 (21.88)
Average precipitation days (≥ 1.0 mm)	9.6	9.1	9.7	8.8	7.5	7.6	7.2	6.3	9.1	10.1	9.9	10.8	105.6
Mean monthly sunshine hours	61.9	89.2	128.7	201.9	231.1	232.2	228.7	222.7	167.7	123.2	77.0	59.8	1,824
Source 1: Met Office (precipitation days 1981-2010)
Source 2: Starlings Roost Weather

== Walton Pier ==
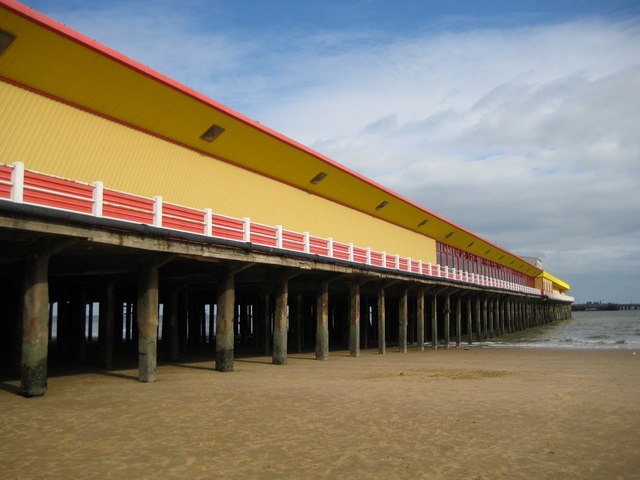
Walton pier, 2009

The original 150 ft pier was built in 1830, one of the earliest in the country. It was built for landing goods and passengers on steamers to Walton, and was lengthened to 330 ft in 1848. The pier was badly damaged in a storm in January 1871. A second pier was authorised by the Walton-on-the-Naze Pier Order 1878 and opened in 1880, but it also did not last. In 1895, the Walton Pier and Hotel Company Ltd opened a replacement pier 500 ft longer than the original. in 1898, the Coast Development Company extended the pier to 2610 ft, becoming the third longest pier in the country. When the new pier opened in 1895, an electric tramway was installed to take passengers from the steamers to the front of the pier. This was in use until 1935 when it was upgraded to a battery-powered carriage. In 1945 fire damaged the pier, and the carriage was replaced by a diesel locomotive train. This was removed during the 1970s. In February 2021, part of the pier collapsed into the sea during Storm Darcy.

In 1937, the pier was bought by Charles Goss, who formed the New Walton Pier Company. At the time, the pier featured a pavilion at the seaward end, an amusement arcade, a tent that served as a theatre, and the Seaspray Lounge. In October 2011, the pier was put up for sale for £2.5 million, and was taken off the market in February 2012. In July 2016, the pier was bought by Russell Bolesworth for an unspecified amount. In 2022, the pier underwent a major revamp with a large arcade area, and was reopened to the public on 16 July 2022.

The Walton and Frinton lifeboat has been moored afloat near the end of the pier since 1900.

== War memorial ==
The unusual war memorial commemorates a Halifax crew who all died when they crashed on the Naze. It also has a tribute to Herbert George Columbine, who was awarded the VC and after whom the local leisure centre is named, and a tribute to those lost from HMS Conquest during World War I.

== Lifeboat house ==
The old lifeboat house on East Terrace dates from 1884: it now houses the Walton Maritime Museum. It was designed by C H Cooke and is a grade II listed building.

== Governance ==
There are three tiers of local government covering Walton-on-the-Naze, at parish (town), district, and county level: Frinton and Walton Town Council, Tendring District Council, and Essex County Council. The town council is based at the Council House in the Triangle Shopping Centre, in the suburbs of Frinton.

Nationally, it lies within the United Kingdom Parliamentary constituency of Clacton.

=== Administrative history ===
The ancient parish was called Walton-le-Soken, but Walton-on-the-Naze came to be a commonly used alternative name for it. In 1841 legislation was passed allowing for a body of improvement commissioners to administer the parish, with particular responsibility to provide sea defences. For some years after the legislation was passed the commissioners did not in practice operate, with a fear in the parish that the cost of providing the services and sea defences envisaged would be too great. It was not until 1868 that the commissioners actually took up their powers.

The commissioners continued to run the town until 1894, when such improvement commissioners' districts were reconstituted as urban districts under the Local Government Act 1894.

Walton-on-the-Naze Urban District was abolished in 1934, merging with the neighbouring urban district of Frinton-on-Sea and the parishes of Great Holland and Kirby-le-Soken to form a new urban district called Frinton and Walton. At the 1931 census (the last before the abolition of the urban district and civil parish), Walton had a population of 3,071.

Frinton and Walton Urban District was in turn abolished in 1974, becoming part of the new district of Tendring. A successor parish called Frinton and Walton was created covering the area of the former urban district, with its parish council taking the name Frinton and Walton Town Council.

== Cultural references ==
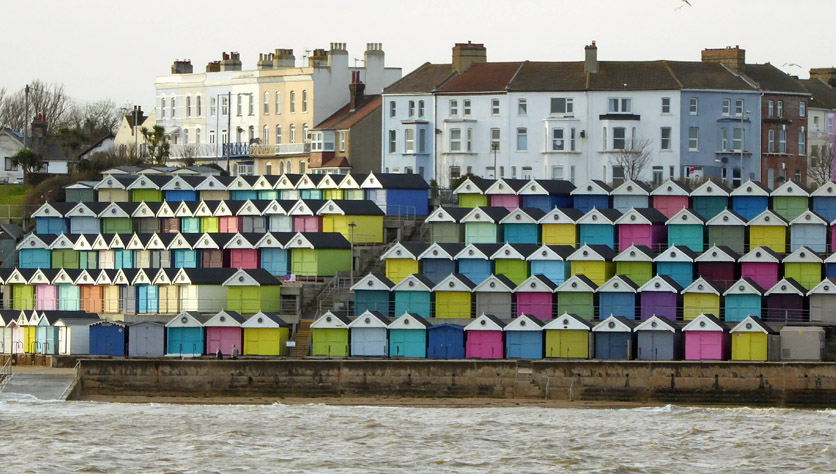
Walton is known for its colourful beach huts

Hamford Water and the town of Walton-on-the-Naze are the location of Arthur Ransome's Swallows and Amazons series book, Secret Water.

The town is referred to in the episode 'General Hospital' of the Blackadder Goes Forth series. When Lieutenant George is injured and sent to the military infirmary, Captain Blackadder visits him with the ulterior motive of getting his hands on the food sent to George by his family, whom Blackadder refers to as a "collection of inbred mutants". When George retorts that his family are not inbred, Blackadder replies, "Come on, somewhere outside Saffron Walden there's an uncle who's seven feet tall with no chin and an Adam's apple that makes him look as though he's constantly trying to swallow a ballcock!", to which George replies, "I have not got any uncles like that! Anyway, he lives in Walton-on-the-Naze".

Walton features as a turning point in the song "Tracy Jacks" from the album Parklife by Blur. The song's character, Tracy Jacks, takes "the first train to Walton" and stands "on the seafront". (Three of the band's members grew up in Colchester, from where one can take a train to Walton-on-the-Naze.)

The first iteration of "The Stig", an anonymous, petrol-guzzling racing car driver, created for and featuring in the 'Top Gear' television series, was killed off in 2003 when he accidentally drove "The 'Top Gear' Jag" off the deck of a Royal Navy aircraft carrier. In February 2009, it is revealed he survived the accident when a group of men playing frisbee on Walton-on-the-Naze's Central beach witnessed "The Stig", wearing his iconic black overalls and helmet, emerge from the waves, initially mistake their frisbee for a steering wheel, before turning and running down the beach and disappearing under the Pier.

Walton was the inspiration for the fictional Balford-le-Nez in Elizabeth George's detective story Deception on His Mind.

The seaside and pier of Walton were referred to briefly in an episode of EastEnders on 3 April 2017. During a scene between Martin and Stacey Fowler, Martin says that his sister Michelle and her friend Rachel took him and his other sister Vicki "down to the seaside, you know. Walton-on-the-Naze." Martin continues to talk about what they did on their trip to Walton. "Paddling, took us up the pier, bit of ice cream, building the sandcastles. The lot." Martin also references that they booked a caravan during their Walton trip, though the specific caravan site is not mentioned.

"Port Walton" is also featured in Assassin's Creed Valhalla as a military base in Essexe, garrisoned by West Saxon troops. The protagonist Eivor attacks the base to free a number of Rollo's warriors, who had earlier been captured in an ambush on their camp by Saxon soldiers.

On season 9, episode 8 of Call the Midwife, Chummy states that Peter's parents moved to Walton-on-the-Naze.

== Notable residents ==
- Frank Paton, artist, moved to Walton-on-the-Naze shortly before his death in 1909.
- Ben Raemers, professional skateboarder, lived in Walton-on-the-Naze and grew up there, where he first started skateboarding at the age of 10.
