= Kirby-le-Soken =

Village in Essex, England

Coordinates: 51.851°N 1.225°E

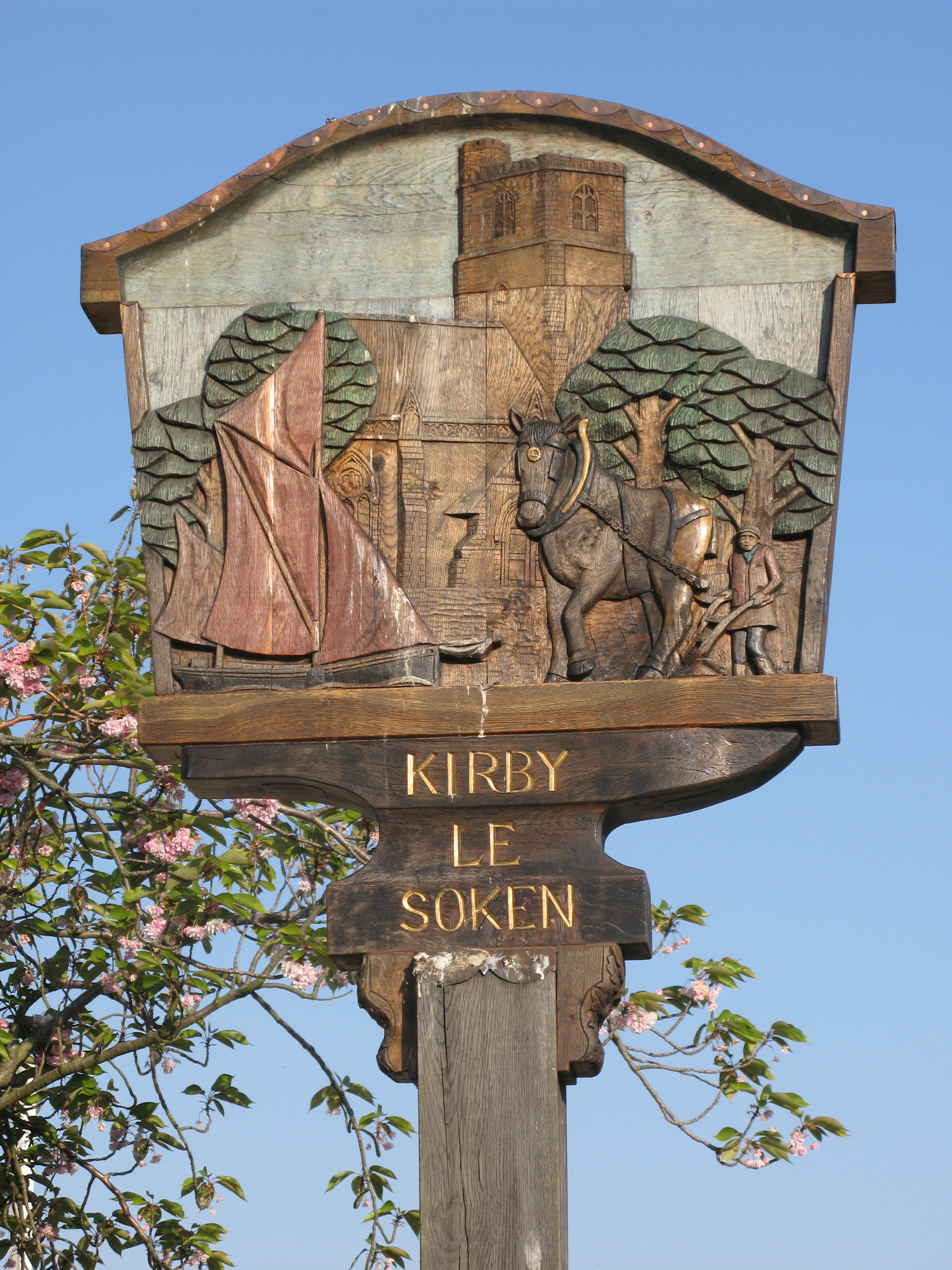

- Location within Essex
- Area: 0.590 km^{2} (0.228 sq mi)
- Population: 1,232 (Built up area, 2021)
  - Density: 2,088/km^{2} (5,410/sq mi)
- OS grid reference: TM220220
- Civil parish: Frinton and Walton
- District: Tendring
- Shire county: Essex
- Region: East
- Country: England
- Sovereign state: United Kingdom
- Post town: FRINTON-ON-SEA
- Postcode district: CO13
- Dialling code: 01255
- Police: Essex
- Fire: Essex
- Ambulance: East of England
- UK Parliament: Clacton

Kirby-le-Soken is a village in the civil parish of Frinton and Walton, in the Tendring district of Essex, England. It lies to the west of Frinton-on-Sea and Walton-on-the-Naze. It forms part of the area known as The Sokens. The village is separated from nearby Kirby Cross and the neighbouring towns by fields. The village has two pubs, two churches and a millennium forest.

Every year, the village holds the Grand village fete on the last bank holiday of the year which is filled with dog shows, old carnival games and other competitions. there are other small fetes throughout the year as well.

At the 2021 census the built up area as defined by the Office for National Statistics had a population of 1,232.

== History ==
Kirby-le-Soken was an ancient parish in the Tendring hundred of Essex. As well as the village of Kirby-le-Soken itself, the parish also included Kirby Cross and surrounding rural areas. The parish was abolished in 1934, when its area was merged with the neighbouring parish of Great Holland and the two urban districts of Frinton-on-Sea and Walton-on-the-Naze to become a new urban district called Frinton and Walton. At the 1931 census (the last before the abolition of the civil parish), Kirby-le-Soken had a population of 836.
