= Tendring District =

Non-metropolitan district of Essex, England

- Non-metropolitan district
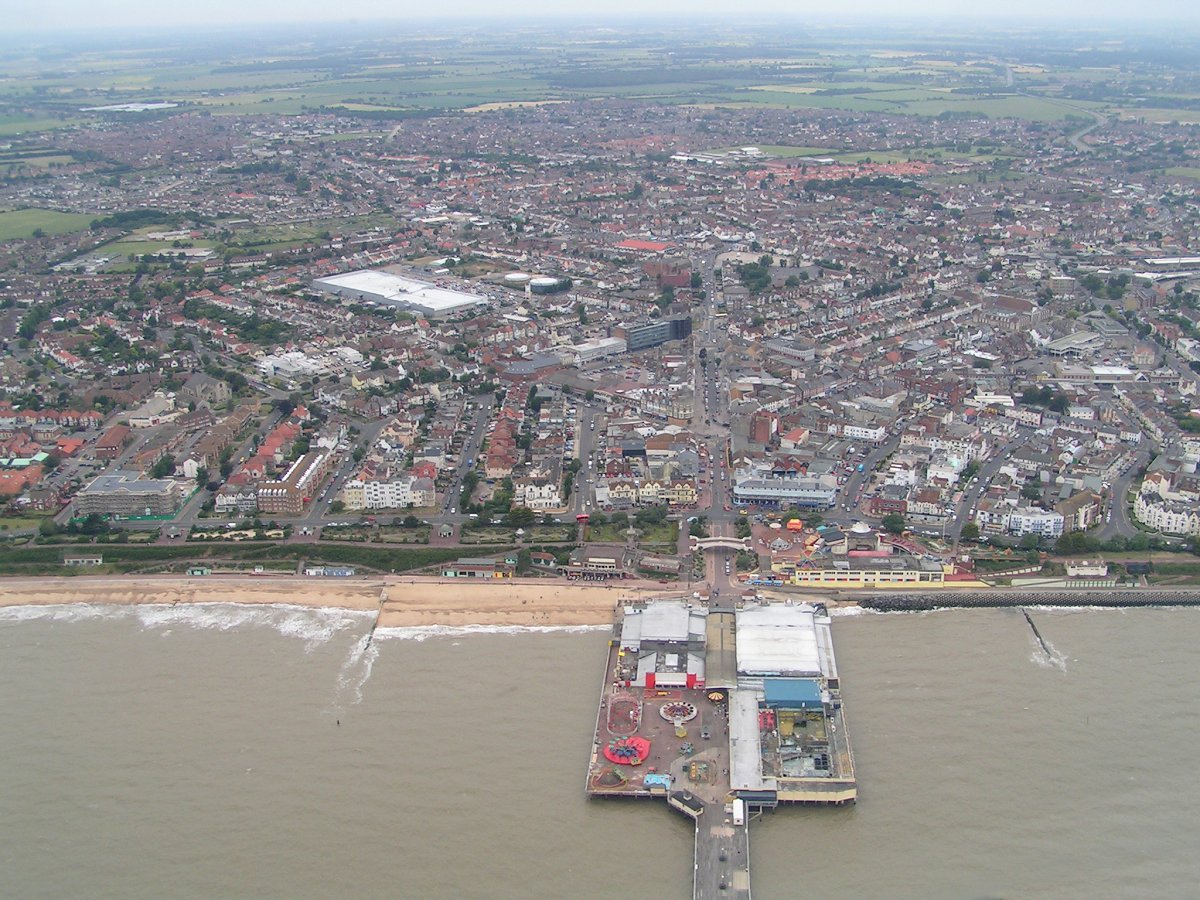
- Clacton-on-Sea, the administrative centre of the district
- Motto: Latin: Pro Bono Omnium, lit. 'for the good of all'
- Tendring, shown within Essex
- Coordinates: 51°47′N 1°08′E
- Sovereign state: United Kingdom
- Country: England
- Region: East of England
- County: Essex
- Incorporated: 1 April 1974
- Named for: Tendring Hundred
- Administrative HQ: Clacton-on-Sea

Government
  - Type: Non-metropolitan district
  - Body: Tendring District Council
  - Executive: Leader and cabinet
  - Control: No overall control
  - Leader: Mark Stephenson (Ind.)
  - Chair: Dan Casey
  - MPs: Bernard Jenkin (Conservative Party (UK)), Nigel Farage (Reform UK)

Area
  - Total: 141 sq mi (366 km^{2})
  - Land: 130 sq mi (336 km^{2})
  - Rank: 110th

Population (2025)
  - Total: 159,060
  - Rank: 142nd
  - Density: 1,230/sq mi (473/km^{2})

Ethnicity (2021)
  - Ethnic groups: List: 96.2% White; 1.6% Mixed; 1.2% Asian; 0.6% Black; 0.4% other

Religion (2021)
  - Religion: List: 49.3% Christianity; 43.2% no religion; 0.4% Islam; 0.3% Buddhism; 0.2% Hinduism; 0.2% Judaism; 0.0% Sikhism; 0.5% other; 5.9% not stated
- Time zone: UTC+0 (GMT)
  - Summer (DST): UTC+1 (BST)
- Postcode areas: CO
- Dialling codes: 01255
- GSS code: E07000076
- Website: tendringdc.gov.uk

Tendring District is a local government district in north-east Essex, England. Its council is based in Clacton-on-Sea, its largest town; others are Brightlingsea, Harwich, Dovercourt, Frinton-on-Sea, Manningtree and Walton-on-the-Naze.

The district borders the City of Colchester to the west and the Babergh District of Suffolk, across the estuary of the river Stour, to the north. To the east and south, it faces the North Sea, with the estuary of the river Colne to the south-west. The area is sometimes referred to as the Tendring Peninsula.

== Toponymy ==
The modern local government district was formed in 1974. The name Tendring comes from the ancient Tendring Hundred, which was named after the small village of Tendring.

== History ==
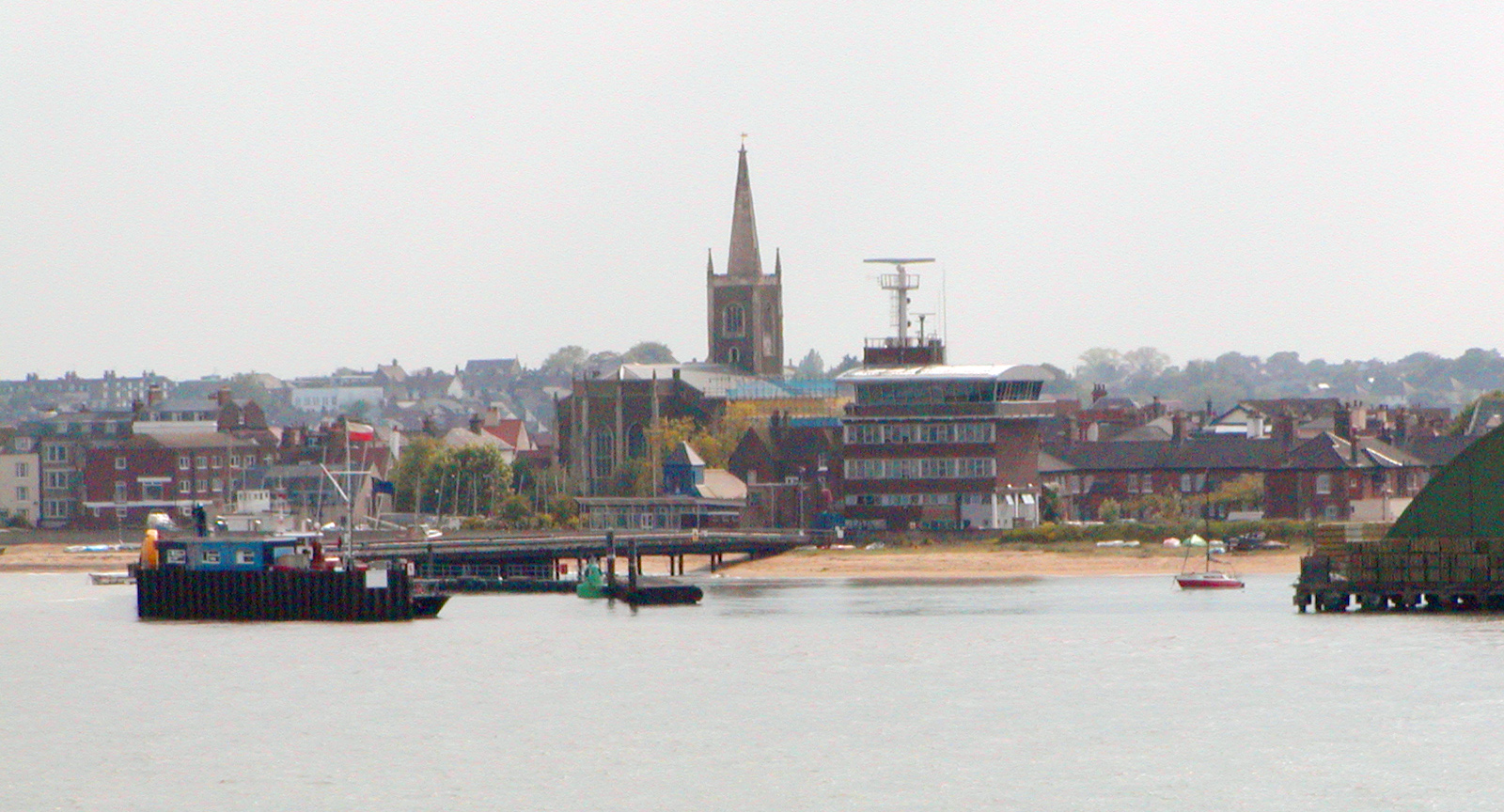
Harwich, an important port town in both the district and Essex

The district was formed on 1 April 1974 under the Local Government Act 1972, covering the whole area of five former districts, which were all abolished at the same time:

- Brightlingsea Urban District
- Clacton Urban District
- Frinton and Walton Urban District
- Harwich Municipal Borough
- Tendring Rural District.

The new district was named after the ancient Tendring Hundred which was, in turn, named after the small village of Tendring at the centre of the area.

The Tendring Poor Law Union, established in 1835, had covered the same area as the present district.

During the English Civil War, the self-appointed Witchfinder General Matthew Hopkins carried out many trials throughout this and the surrounding area, especially in the town of Manningtree and village of Mistley on the river Stour.

In March 2026, the government announced that it would abolish the district in 2028 as part of local government reform across Essex. These proposals were withdrawn in September 2026.

== Governance ==
Tendring District Council

Type
- Type: Non-metropolitan district

Leadership
- Chair: Ann Oxley, Independent since 19 May 2026
- Leader: Mark Stephenson, Independent since 23 May 2023
- Chief executive: Ian Davidson, since 1 December 2010

Structure
- Seats: 48 councillors
- Political groups: Administration (28) Independent (15) Labour (7) Liberal Democrats (4) Tendring First (1) Other parties (20) Conservative (13) Reform UK (7)

Elections
- Voting system: First-past-the-post
- Last election: 4 May 2023
- Next election: 6 May 2027

Meeting place
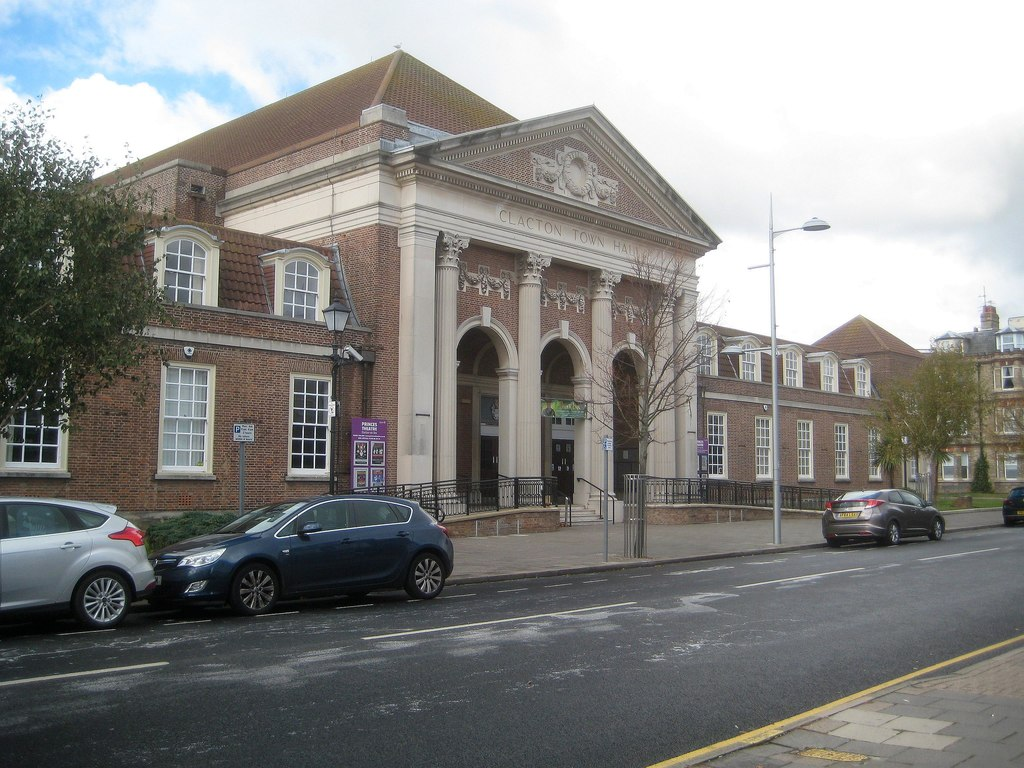
- Town Hall, Station Road, Clacton-on-Sea

Website
- www.tendringdc.gov.uk

Tendring District Council provides district-level services. County-level services are provided by Essex County Council. Much of the district is also covered by civil parishes, which form a third tier of local government.

=== Political control ===
The council has been under no overall control since the 2023 election, being led by a coalition of independent councillors, Labour and the Liberal Democrats.

The first election to the council was held in 1973, initially operating as a shadow authority alongside the outgoing authorities until the new arrangements came into effect on 1 April 1974. Political control of the council since 1974 has been as follows: (Note: Put Tendring in search box to see specific results.)

Party in control	Years
Conservative	1974–1991
No overall control	1991–1995
Labour	1995–1999
No overall control	1999–2011
Conservative	2011–2015
No overall control	2015–present

=== Leadership ===
The leaders of the council since 2009 have been:

Councillor	Party	From	To
Neil Stock	Conservative	2009	27 Nov 2012
Peter Halliday	Conservative	27 Nov 2012	13 Dec 2013
Mick Page	Conservative	11 February 2014	May 2015
Neil Stock	Conservative	26 May 2015	May 2023
Mark Stephenson	Independent	23 May 2023	

=== Composition ===
Since the last boundary changes in 2019, there have been 48 councillors representing 32 wards, with each ward electing up to three councillors. Elections are held every four years.

Following the 2023 election, and subsequent by-elections and changes of allegiance up to July 2026, the composition of the council was:

Party	Councillors
Independent	16
Conservative	13
Reform	7
Labour	7
Liberal Democrats	4
Tendring First	1
Total	48

The Tendring First councillor and ten of the independent councillors form the Tendring Independents group; the other five independents sit as the Independent Group. The council's administration is a coalition of the Tendring Independents, the Independent Group, Labour and the Liberal Democrats.

=== Premises ===
The council has its main offices and meeting place at Clacton Town Hall on Station Road. The building had been built for the former Clacton Urban District Council in 1931.

== Geography ==
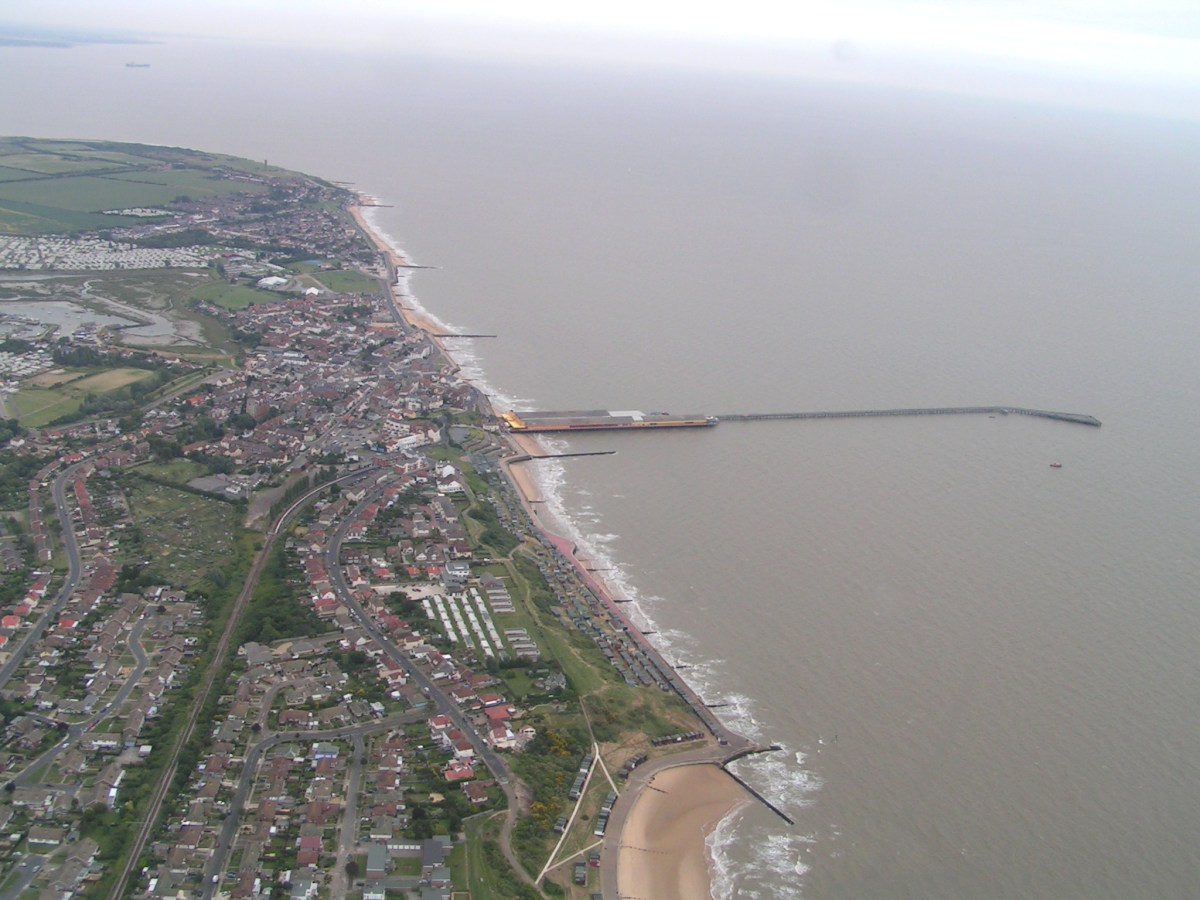
Walton-on-the-Naze, one of the many coastal settlements in the district

The highest part of the district is a low 115 feet (35 m) ridge running west to east only 2 miles (3.2 km) south of the river Stour. The greater part of the district is undulating land sloping very gently to the south which is traversed by a number of streams.

In the extreme east of the district is an area formerly known as the Soken, which was granted special privileges in Saxon times. It is remembered in the place names Kirby-le-Soken, Thorpe-le-Soken and Walton-le-Soken. (Note: An older name for Walton-on-the-Naze.)

=== Demography ===
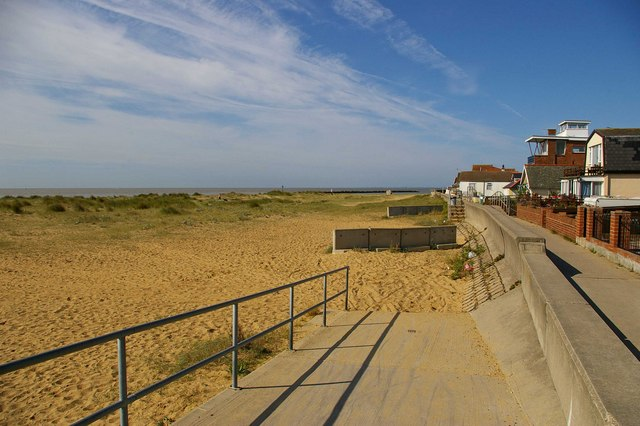
Jaywick, a shanty settlement on the coast near Clacton

Tendring district contains the most deprived part of England, in the Jaywick area. This area was ranked as the most deprived are in the government's indices of deprivation in 2010, 2015, 2019 and 2025.

== Media ==
BBC East and ITV Anglia provide local television services, with signals received from the Sudbury TV transmitter.

Radio stations for the area are:

- BBC Essex
- BBC Radio Suffolk
- Heart East
- Greatest Hits Radio Essex
- Actual Radio.

Local newspapers are:

- Colchester Gazette
- Essex County Standard
- Clacton, Frinton and Walton Gazette
- Harwich and Manningtree Standard.

== Parishes ==
There are 27 civil parishes in the district; the former Clacton Urban District is an unparished area. The parish councils of Brightlingsea, Frinton and Walton, Harwich and Manningtree take the style town council.

- Alresford
- Ardleigh
- Beaumont-cum-Moze
- Bradfield
- Brightlingsea (town)
- Elmstead
- Frating
- Frinton and Walton (town)
- Great Bentley
- Great Bromley
- Great Oakley
- Harwich (town)
- Lawford
- Little Bentley
- Little Bromley
- Little Clacton
- Little Oakley
- Manningtree (town)
- Mistley
- Ramsey and Parkeston
- St Osyth
- Tendring
- Thorpe-le-Soken
- Thorrington
- Weeley
- Wix
- Wrabness.

== Arms ==
Coat of arms of Tendring District

Crest
On a wreath of the colours an ancient ship Gules sail furled Proper flying flags and forked pennon of St. George and charged on the hull with three escallops Or pendent from the yardarm by chains a portcullis Or nailed and spiked Azure.
Escutcheon
Azure on a fess between two chevrons Argent a mural crown Gules all between two flaunches Argent each charged with two bars wavy Azure surmounted of a seaxe point upwards Proper hilt and pommel Or.
Motto
Pro Bono Omnium (For The Good of All)
Badge
On a roundel Azure fimbriated Argent and environed of a wreath of laurel Or a tau cross Argent.

== See also ==
- Listed buildings in Tendring District
