= Weeley =

Village in Essex, England

Coordinates: 51.859°N 1.117°E

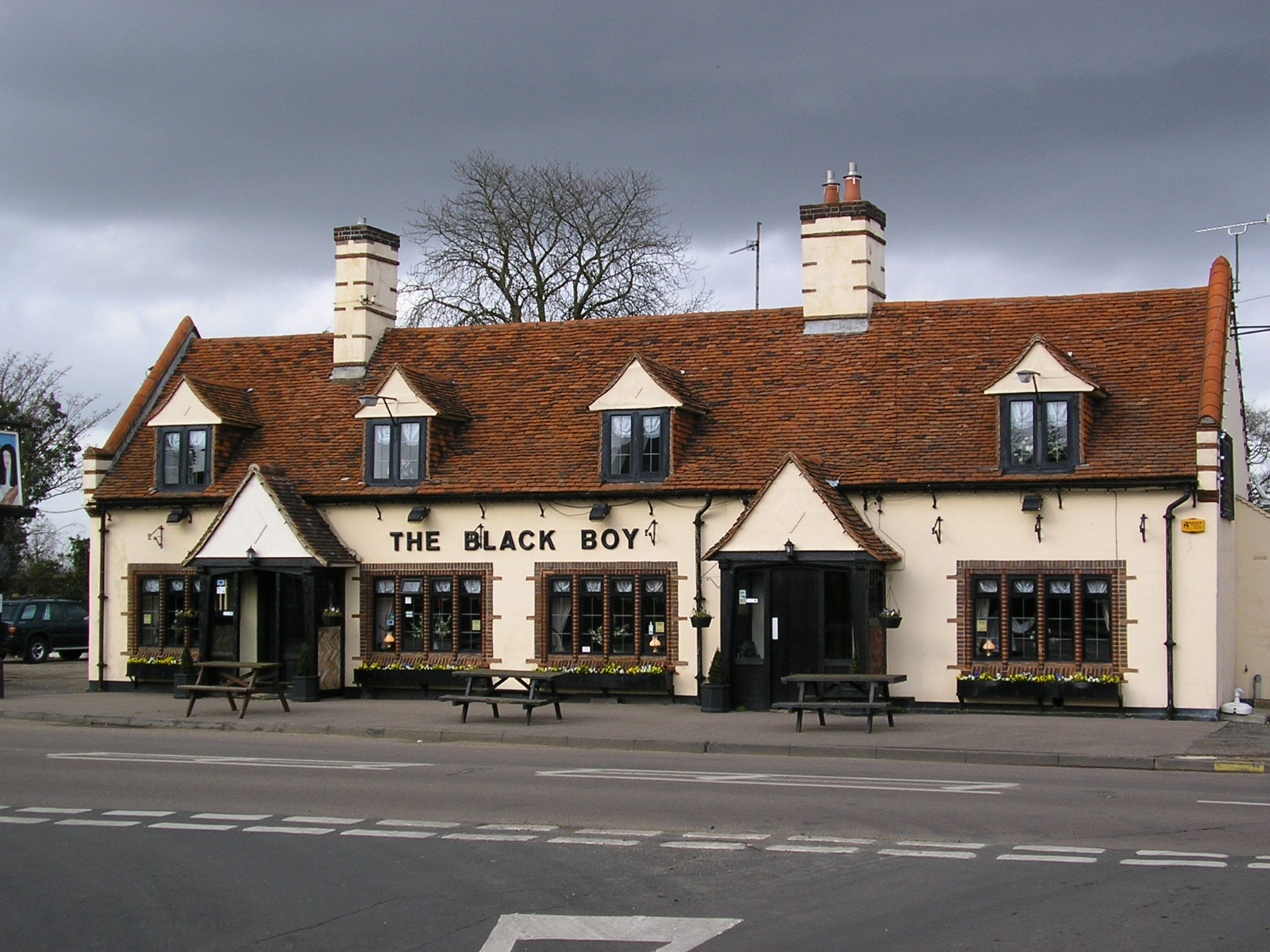
- The Black Boy Inn

- Location within Essex
- Population: 2,234 (Parish, 2021)
- Civil parish: Weeley
- District: Tendring
- Shire county: Essex
- Region: East
- Country: England
- Sovereign state: United Kingdom
- Post town: CLACTON-ON-SEA
- Postcode district: CO16
- Dialling code: 01255
- UK Parliament: Clacton

Weeley is a village and civil parish in the Tendring district of Essex, England. It is served by Weeley railway station on the Sunshine Coast Line. It has bus links to Clacton-on-Sea and Colchester. At the 2021 census the parish had a population of 2,234.

The name came from the Old English "Wēo-lēah" meaning "willow wood / clearing". Weeley is first mentioned in a document from c.1050 when Eadgyva granted Wilgelia alias Wigleya in penance to St Paul's, London. In 1086, Eudo held Wileia. In c.1100, William II confirmed Eudo's holding of the manor.

The parish church is St Andrew's, Weeley, which shares a priest with neighbouring Little Clacton. There is a Church of England voluntary aided primary school, also dedicated to St Andrew, which traces its foundation to the early date of 1797.

Weeley has two claims to fame in military history. During the Napoleonic Wars, between 1803 and 1815, it had a large barracks accommodating up to 3,000 men, initially from three Scottish Highland battalions. The garrisons of the Martello towers at Point Clear, St Osyth, and Jaywick were based in Weeley.

In the Second World War, Weeley was the base of a small secret squad, or "Auxiliary Unit", led by local squire Roger Weeley, and prominently featured in the first book published on the subject, by David Lampe, in 1966. (Eastern Command and many other army records in WO series at National Archives, Kew; J P Foynes "East Anglia versus the Tricolor 1793-1815; David Lampe "Secret Army" 1966).

Weeley has two small local parks, and was host to the Weeley Festival in August 1971. Other local facilities include a village hall, a McDonald's, famously attended by Chelsea manager José Mourinho and a Premier Inn.

Weeley has a personal weather station in the village, which provides 24/7 live weather conditions and weather forecasts for the area.
