= Frinton-on-Sea =

Seaside town in Essex, England

Coordinates: 51.8327°N 1.2452°E

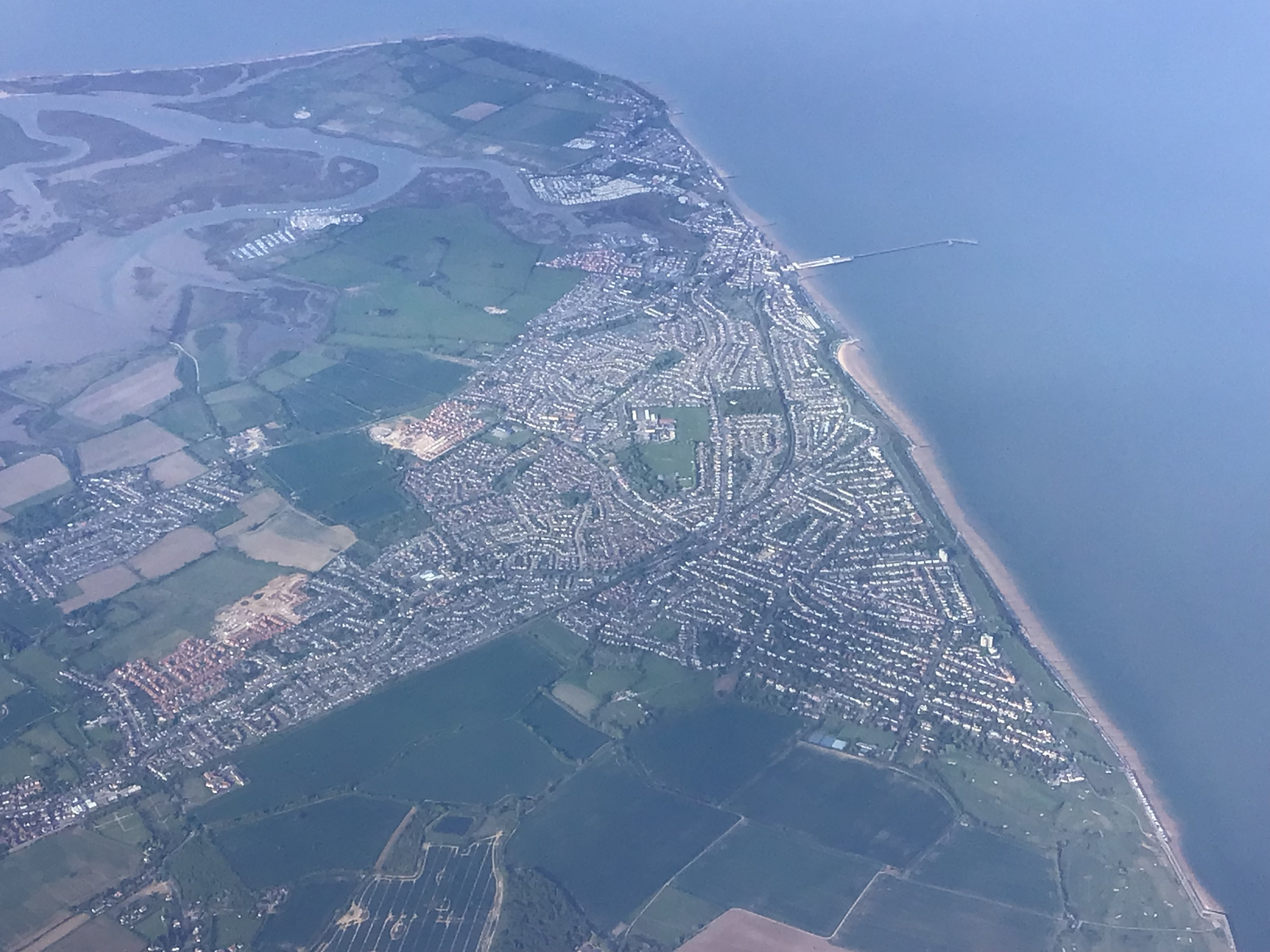
- Aerial view of Frinton-on-Sea

- Location within Essex
- Area: 1.98 km^{2} (0.76 sq mi)
- Population: 4,951 (Built up area, 2021)
  - Density: 2,501/km^{2} (6,480/sq mi)
- OS grid reference: TM236198
- Civil parish: Frinton and Walton
- District: Tendring
- Shire county: Essex
- Region: East
- Country: England
- Sovereign state: United Kingdom
- Post town: FRINTON-ON-SEA
- Postcode district: CO13
- Dialling code: 01255
- Police: Essex
- Fire: Essex
- Ambulance: East of England
- UK Parliament: Clacton

Frinton-on-Sea is a seaside town in the civil parish of Frinton and Walton, in the Tendring district of Essex, England. At the 2021 census, the built up area, as defined by the Office for National Statistics, had a population of 4,951.

== Toponymy ==
The place-name Frinton is first attested in the Domesday Book of 1086, where it appears as Frientuna. The name may mean 'fenced-in or enclosed town or settlement'.

== History ==
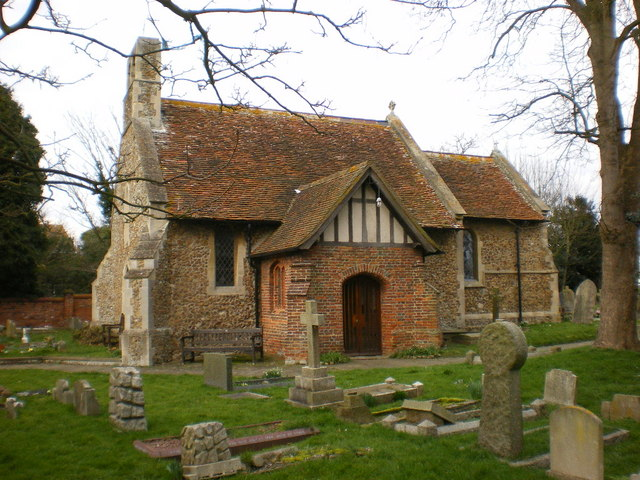
St Mary's Church

Frinton was historically a small village, comprising a church, several farms and a handful of cottages. In the early 1870s, the village was said to comprise just six houses and have a population of 29; it was noted that "...the sea has washed away a great part of the parish, and is still making encroachment." The oldest parts of the original parish church, dedicated to St Mary, date from the from 14th century.

The Tendring Hundred Railway was opened in 1867, skirting the northern edge of Frinton parish, but there was no station at Frinton initially; the nearest were at Kirby Cross and Walton-on-the-Naze. Much of the land around Frinton was subsequently bought by developers in the 1880s with the intention of laying out a new resort. Frinton railway station opened in 1888 to serve the new town.

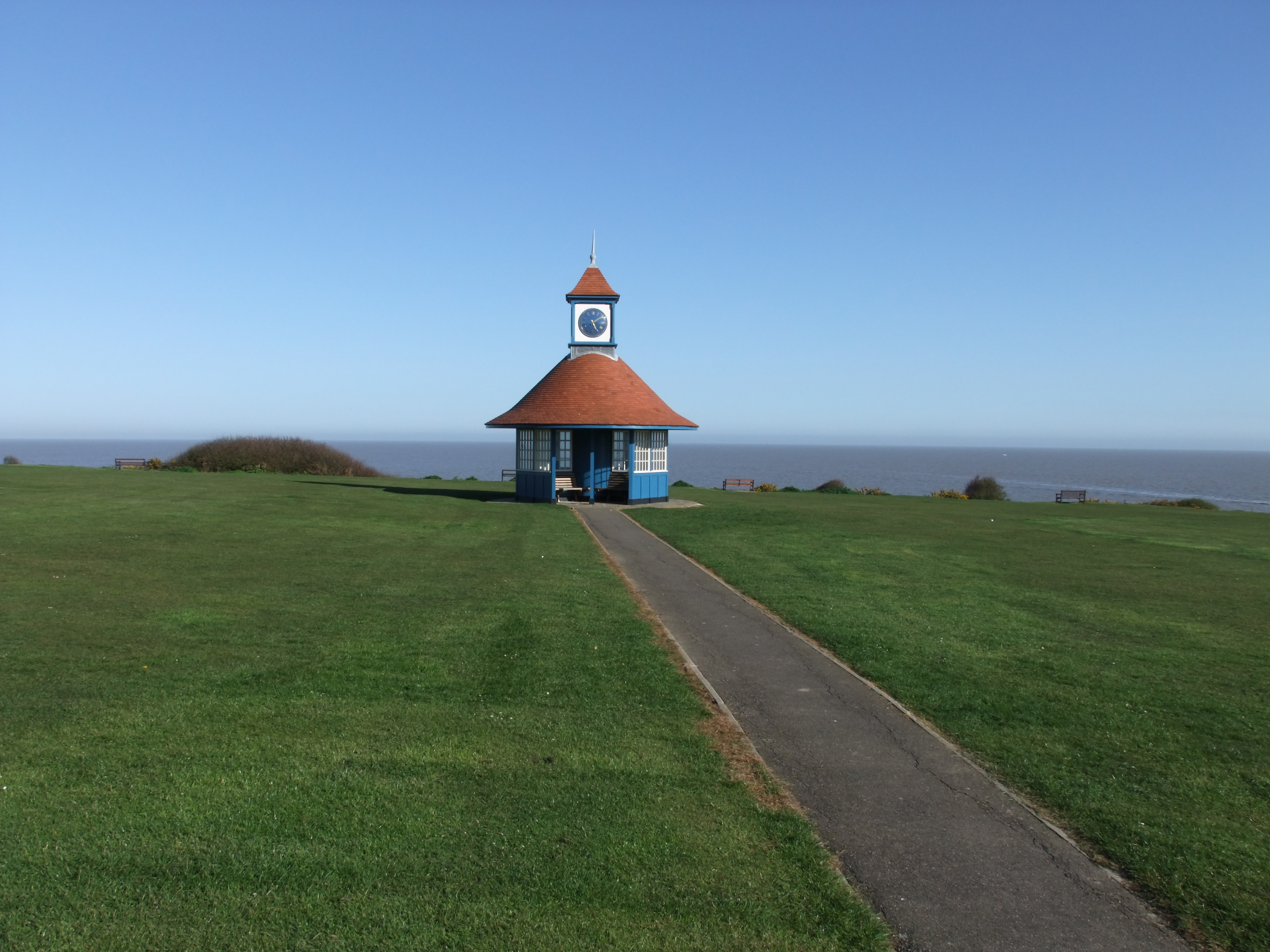
Seafront shelter on the Greensward between the Esplanade and the path down to the beach

In the 1890s, the original developer of the town, Peter Bruff, was bought out by the industrialist Richard Powell Cooper, who had already laid out the golf course. Powell Cooper rejected Bruff's plans for a pier, stipulated the quality of housing to be built and prohibited boarding houses and pubs. The Sea Defence Act 1903 established a project to stabilise the cliffs, with the Greensward, which separates the Esplanade from the sea, put in place to stabilise the land further.

In the first half of the 20th century, the town attracted visitors from high society. A new main shopping street was built linking the railway station to the esplanade. The street was formally opened in 1904 by Louise Margaret, Duchess of Connaught and was named Connaught Avenue in her honour. Other attractions included a lido, complete with palm trees, hotels along the Esplanade and an amateur tennis tournament. The Prince of Wales (later Edward VII) frequented the golf club and Winston Churchill rented a house. Frinton was the last target in England attacked by the Luftwaffe, in 1944.

The town has a reputation for its conservative nature, both politically and in its culture. (Note: It was in a Labour constituency between 1997 and 2005.) Until the beginning of the 21st century, there were no public houses, although there have long been bars in seafront hotels and at the golf and War Memorial clubs; the first pub, the Lock and Barrel, was opened in 2000.

== Governance ==
There are three tiers of local government covering Frinton, at parish (town), district, and county level: Frinton and Walton Town Council, Tendring District Council, and Essex County Council. The town council is based at the Council House in the Triangle Shopping Centre, in the suburbs of Frinton.

Nationally, it lies within the United Kingdom Parliamentary constituency of Clacton.

=== Administrative history ===
Frinton was an ancient parish in the Tendring hundred of Essex. When elected parish and district councils were established under the Local Government Act 1894, Frinton was given a parish council and included in the Tendring Rural District. In 1901, the parish was removed from Tendring Rural District and made its own urban district. Whereas the name of the parish remained officially just Frinton, the urban district was named Frinton-on-Sea.

Frinton-on-Sea Urban District was abolished in 1934, merging with the neighbouring urban district of Walton-on-the-Naze, and the parishes of Great Holland and Kirby-le-Soken to form a new urban district called Frinton and Walton. At the 1931 census, the last before the abolition of the civil parish, Frinton had a population of 2,196.

Frinton and Walton Urban District was, in turn, abolished in 1974, becoming part of the new district of Tendring. A successor parish called Frinton and Walton was created covering the area of the former urban district, with its parish council taking the name Frinton and Walton Town Council.

== Geography ==
Frinton has three points of entry by road: an unadopted road from Walton-on-the-Naze in the north, a residential road and a CCTV monitored level crossing adjacent to the railway station, which replaced the older gated crossing in 2009. Frinton was once geographically distinct, but housing estates now line the roads between Frinton and Walton-on-the-Naze, Kirby Cross and Kirby-Le-Soken.

The town has sandy and stone beach washed daily, more than 1 mile (1.6 km) long, with wardens in season and an area of sea zoned for swimming, sailing and windsurfing. The shore is lined by a promenade with several hundred beach huts. Landward from the promenade is a long greensward, popular with young and old alike, stretching from the boundary with Walton to the golf club in the south.

Gunfleet Lighthouse lies 6 miles (9.7 km) offshore; constructed in 1850, it was abandoned in 1921.

== Transport ==
Frinton-on-Sea railway station lies on the Walton branch of the Sunshine Coast Line; Greater Anglia operates generally hourly services between Colchester Town and Walton-on-the-Naze.

Local bus services are operated by Transport Made Simple under the brand Central Connect; routes connect the town with Clacton, Walton and Colchester.

== Religion ==
There are two Anglican parish churches: St Mary the Virgin is Norman in parts; The church of St Mary Magdalene was built in 1928 to accommodate worshippers from St Mary the Virgin. Across the road from St Mary Magadalene is the Evangelical Gospel Chapel. Frinton's Catholic church, the Church of the Sacred Heart and St Francis, was built in 1904, as a public hall known as Queen's Hall; the architect was William Hayne. It was acquired as a church in the 1920s. There is also a Methodist church and a Free church.

== Media ==
Local news and television programmes are provided by BBC East and ITV Anglia. Television signals are received from the Sudbury TV transmitter.

Local radio stations are BBC Essex on 103.5 FM, Heart East on 96.1 FM, Greatest Hits Radio East (formerly Dream 100 FM) on 100.2 FM and Actual Radio an DAB station.

The town is served by the local newspaper, Clacton and Frinton Gazette, which publishes on Thursdays.

== Notable residents ==
- T.E.B. Clarke – English screenwriter (1907–1989)
- Richard Cobb – British historian and essayist (1917–1996)
- Ross Davidson – Scottish actor (1949–2006)
- Fritz Dupre – German metal ores trader
- Alfred 'Ken' Gatward – Royal Air Force pilot
- David Hamilton (broadcasting) – British radio & TV presenter (born 1938)
- Mike Read – English radio presenter and musician (born 1947)
- Deborah Watling – English actress (1948–2017).
