= St Botolph's Priory =

Ruined medieval building in Colchester, England

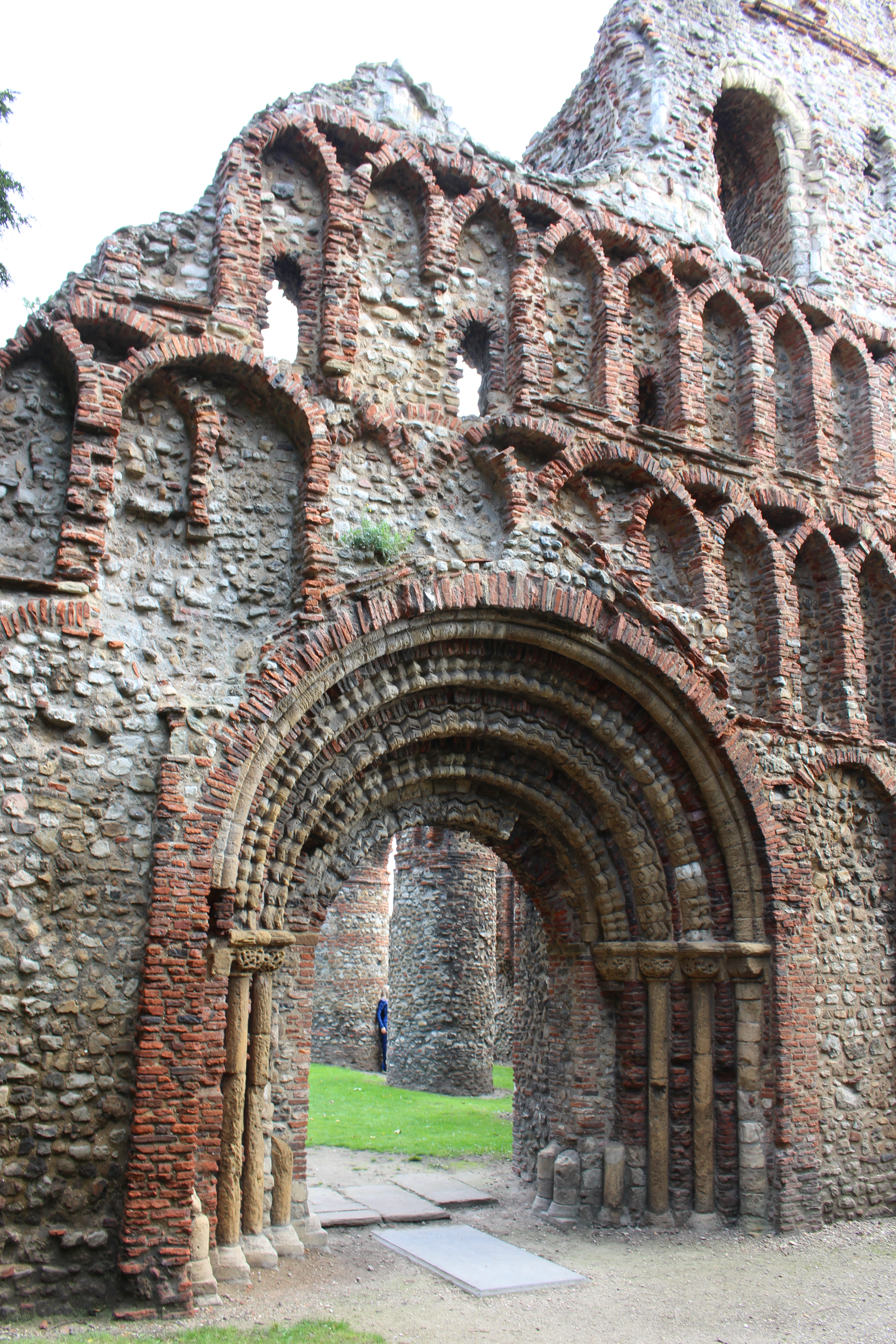
- Pardon door of the Priory Church
- Interactive map of St Botolph's Priory

Monastery information
- Order: Order of St Augustine
- Established: c.1100
- Disestablished: 1536
- Dedication: St Botolph, St Catherine of Alexandria

People
- Founder: Ainulf

Architecture
- Status: Dissolved
- Heritage designation: Grade I

Site
- Location: Colchester, Essex, United Kingdom
- Coordinates: 51.8874°N 0.9046°E
- Visible remains: Large portions of the nave church
- Public access: yes

St Botolph's Priory was a medieval house of Augustinian canons in Colchester, Essex, founded c. 1093. The priory had the distinction of being the first and leading Augustinian convent in England until its dissolution in 1536.

The remains are protected as both a scheduled monument and Grade I listed building.

== History ==
=== Foundation ===
An Anglo-Saxon church dedicated to St Botolph originally stood on the site of the priory, with a tower which resembled the Anglo-Saxon tower of Holy Trinity Church in Colchester. The church's conversion to an Augustinian priory began with a Kentish priest called Norman, who had studied under Anselm of Canterbury in France before returning to England and settling in Colchester. There, he joined a college of secular priests at the church of St Botolph who had resolved to join a religious order, and whose leader, Ainulf, turned to Norman for advice on the matter. When Norman suggested the Augustinian order, which at the time had no Houses in England, Ainulf and his followers agreed, sending him back to Anselm, archbishop of Canterbury, who gave Norman a letter of recommendation to take to the abbot of Mont-Saint-Éloi.

Norman and a companion took this letter to the France, first to Chartres and then to Beauvais, where they learned the Rule of St Augustine before returning to Colchester. There they transformed the church of St Botolph into St Botolph's Priory, with Ainulf as its first prior; this must have occurred sometime between when Anselm consecrated the undertaking in 1093, and William II's granting of a charter of protection to the canons of the Priory, which was before his death in 1100. Later, in 1108, Norman left Colchester with the Ainulf's blessing to become the first prior of Holy Trinity Priory. Pope Paschal II later confirmed the creation of St Botolph's Priory in a papal bull in August 1116. With this, they became the first Augustinian institution in England. As well as St Botolph the priory also honoured St Julian and St Denis.

=== Medieval history ===
As they were the first of their order in England they were always to be held first in dignity, and to have authority over all houses of St Augustine. The Priory was to be free from the jurisdiction of any person, secular or ecclesiastical, and on the death of Ainulf or any of his successors a new head was to be elected by the majority of the brethren and presented to the Bishop of London for consecration with special powers. In the middle of the fourteenth century a violent altercation took place between the priory and St John's Abbey.

The Abbey complained to the pope that prior John with two of his canons, John Noreys and Thomas de Gipwico, along with several laymen, attacked one of the monks of St John's with a sword and dagger and blockaded them within the abbey, before a third canon with some laymen forced entry and attacked the abbot and convent. Pope Urban V on 1 July 1363 ordered the Archbishop of Canterbury to excommunicate the offending prior and canons if they could be found guilty. This incident appears to have arisen out of disputes over control of the church of St Peter and other matters in Colchester and over Layer de la Haye. These disputes were settled the following year.

In 1380 the prior and canons complained to the King Richard II that several people were pretending to be their attorneys and proctors, and were using forged letters to collect money from unsuspecting victims. The king gave orders for the offenders to be arrested and sent to Newgate gaol, and the forged letters were to be delivered to the archbishop of Canterbury.

On 20 February 1421 Pope Martin V granted a relaxation of penance to penitents who on the feast of St Denis should visit and give alms for the conservation and repair of the priory, which was founded and sufficiently endowed for a prior and twelve canons, but had become impoverished.

Prior John Depyng was made abbot of St Osyth's Priory in 1434, and took with him goods of considerable value belonging to the priory. He never returned these, and after his death St Botolph's brought an apparently unsuccessful lawsuit in Chancery against St Osyth's for their recovery.

=== Dissolution and later history ===
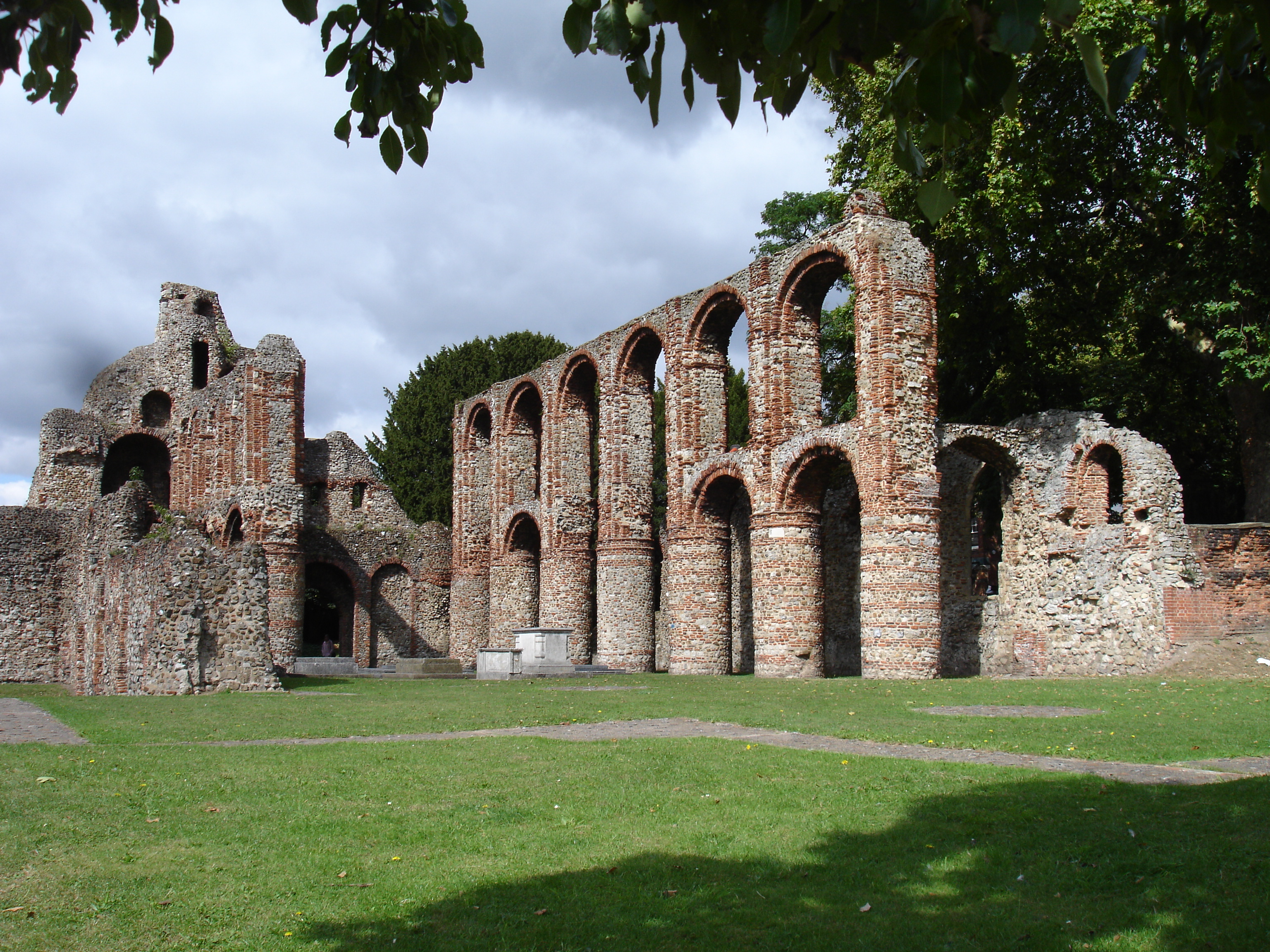
The nave of the priory church

Early in 1534 the prior and seven canons, Robert Bawde, Richard Parker, William Shyrwyn, John Garrard, John Gyppys, Robert Rand and William Patche, took the oath of fealty under the Act of Succession, thus avoiding prosecution under the Treasons Act 1534.

The priory was dissolved in accordance with the Suppression of Religious Houses Act 1535. On 26 May in that year it was granted with all its possessions, including the manors of Blindknights, Canwikes and Dilbridge to Sir Thomas Audley. Audley had licence on 12 September 1540, to grant the site of the priory to John Golder and Anastasia his wife.

As the priory had been an Augustinian house, and therefore the church had both parochial and conventual functions, the nave was retained as a parish church. The choir, which had been solely for the use of the canons, was not spared however, and was demolished along with the cloisters, chapter house and associated buildings. The church remained this way until the Siege of Colchester in 1648 during the Second English Civil War. A Royalist army had seized the town, which was then surrounded and bombarded by the New Model Army led by Thomas Fairfax, with St Botolph's being caught in the crossfire of the assault on South Gate, reducing it to its present ruinous state.

In 1837 a Gothic Victorian church was built next to the ruins, partially covering the location of the priory's cloister. The ruins themselves are now a public park, and in 2010-12 improvements were made to make them more accessible.

== Religious House ==
=== Priory Church ===
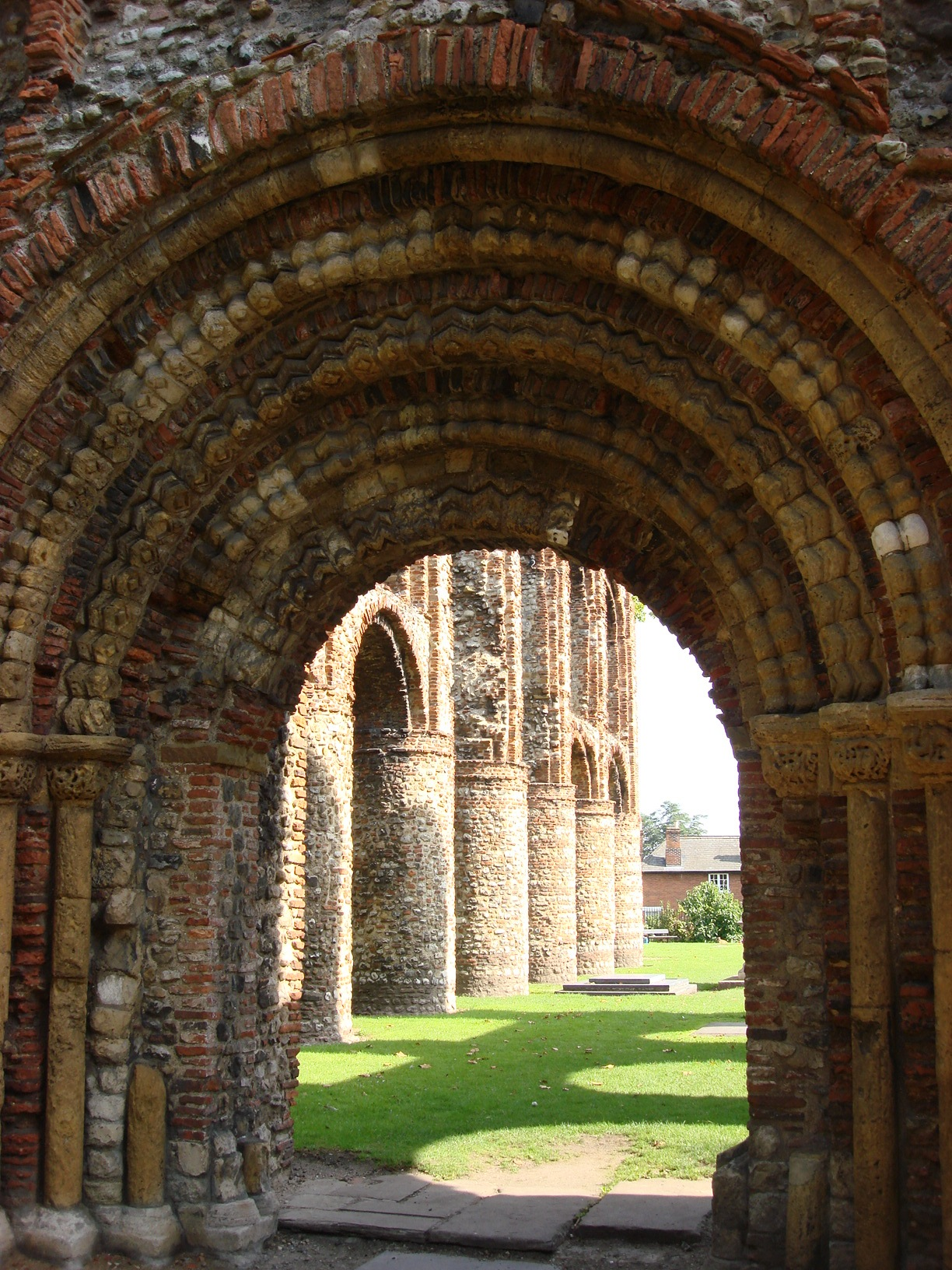
The Pardon door of the Priory Church

The priory church was built in Norman style on the site of the earlier Church of St Botolph, the work having been completed by 1177 when it was dedicated. Unlike nearby St John's Abbey, St Botolph's Priory initially received little from rich patrons, despite an endowment from Henry I, and it was several decades before the priory church was fully built. The church was just over 176 ft (53.7m) long (about twice as long as the surviving standing ruins), with a central tower and transepts. The length of the nave was 110 ft (33.5m) long, with its breadth (including aisles) being 55 ft (16.75m); the height of the gable was around 45 ft (13.7m), and the rose window within it is thought to be one of the earliest examples in England. The arms of the church were 42 ft (12.8m) long.

The church had several side chapels, including a lady chapel, a chapel dedicated to St Catherine of Alexandria (recorded in the early fifteenth Century) and by 1281 a chapel to St Thomas Becket. Two of these, one of which was the lady chapel, were located on the Priory's western side. The lady chapel contained an image of Mary, which had an Eternal Light burning in it funded by income from a piece of land at Colchester's Hythe port. By the early 1500s there was also a fourth chapel, dedicated to the Holy Trinity. The church had at least two bells, a Sanctus bell and a requiem bell. The main west door into the church was called the Pardon Door, because it was where pardons were granted at the feast of St Denis (9 October, known as Pardon Day in Medieval Colchester). The cloisters of the church were located on its south side, and the canons' dormitory was refurbished in 1383.

The house was headed by a Prior, and initially contained twelve canons representing the Twelve Apostles. In 1281, in return for benefactions by a Master Simon de Eylondia, the Prior bound the priory to maintain forever a thirteenth canon, to be nominated by Master Simon and his assigns. This thirteenth canon was to celebrate divine service daily at the altar of St Thomas in the priory church for Master Simon's soul and the souls of his parents, Robert and Cecily; this agreement was confirmed by the Bishop of London and by the dean and chapter of St Paul's Cathedral. Master Simon afterwards granted additional rents and tenements from which he assigned half a mark for the vesture of the thirteenth canon, 3s. for the pittance of the convent, and 2s. 6d. for maintaining thirty poor men on his anniversary, with the remainder to be used for the maintenance of the priory altar. In 1296 he assigned the nomination of the canon to the abbot of Colchester.

These agreements were later drawn up in detail by Prior John de Colum, who ordered them to be read annually by the prior, sub-prior and sacristan. In 1406 the priory selected one of its canons to celebrate divine service daily in the chapel of St Catharine within the conventual section of the priory church for the soul of the late William Colchester, Abbot of Westminster, and for the souls of his father and mother; this canon was also to celebrate William Colchester's anniversary with chant and solemn tolling of bells in the parish church of St Nicholas in Colchester as well as at the priory. 6d. was to be paid weekly to the canon, and a distribution of 26s. 8d. was to be made on the day of the anniversary between the rector of St Nicholas, the ministers and officers of the priory and St Nicholas, the poor, the prisoners in Colchester Castle, and for the upkeep of the tombs of the abbot's parents. In case of failure to keep this agreement, the priory was to pay to the abbot or his successors a fine of £10, levied from its manors of Layer de la Haye, Peldon and Abberton.

=== Possessions ===
Although not as wealthy as its rival, St John's Abbey, St Botolph's did own considerable holdings in Essex and southern and eastern England. An early source of income was from the tithes of the demesne of Hatfield, granted to the Priory by Henry I from his own personal estates. However, this led later to disputes with Hatfield Regis Priory, until the two settled disputes in 1194. Henry also granted the canons of the priory a third share of the mill called Midelmeln (modern Middle Mill in Castle Park, Colchester), as well as confirming the grants made to them by Hugh FitzStephen, under a new condition that they should supply him during expeditions against Wales with a horse worth 5s., a sack and a pike. Other charters confirmed by Henry included the grants made by Count Eustace of Boulogne. Richard I granted a charter on 4 December 1189, in which he extended the list of liberties and confirmed their possessions in detail, these including the churches of Gamlingay in Cambridgeshire, Layer de la Haye and Marks Tey. These and other charters were confirmed by Henry IV in 1400, and again by Henry VI in 1427.

The temporalities of the priory were valued in the Taxation of 1291 at £42 16s. 5½d. annually, breaking down to £18 1s. 10d. in Colchester, £6 2s. 6d. in Layer de la Haye, £5 6s. 8d. in Gamlingay, £3 in Colne Engaine and £2 17s. 4d. in Ardleigh; and it also owned spiritualities worth £10 15s. 4d. in Hatfield Regis, Witham, Boxted and Frating in Essex, and Reydon in Suffolk. The church of St Peter, Colchester, was appropriated to the priory in 1318, and the church of Chigwell in 1440; and the advowsons of the rectories of All Saints, St James, St Martin and Mile End, in Colchester, and of Frating also belonged to it. The church of Gamlingay, was surrendered to Merton College, Oxford in 1415. The stock of the priory within Colchester at Michaelmas 1295, was valued for the taxation of a seventh granted to Edward I, and was found to consist of 4 quarters of rye, 12 quarters of barley, 8 quarters of oats, 4 plough cattle, 4 oxen, a bull, 6 cows, 32 sheep and 7 lambs, altogether worth £10 12s. 6d. A similar valuation taken five years later amounted to £6 19s. 8d.

Around Colchester the priory owned land at Greenstead and Cannock (or Canwick, from Canon's Wick) in West Donyland, and several watermills in and around the town, including East Mill, Cannock Mill and Hull Mill (the latter two located on Bourne Brook, where there was a third mill, Bourne Mill, belonging to St John's Abbey).

=== List of priors ===
St Botolph's Priory was led by a prior, whose seal was a pointed oval of yellow brown wax, 2½ in. by 1¾ in., representing Christ seated blessing two figures, one on the right a bishop (St Julian), and the other on the left an abbot (St Botolph). The Legend on the seal read "SIGILL ECCLESIE SANCTI . . . LFI DE COLECESTR".

The Priors of St Botolph's were:

- Ainulf or Eynulph, the first prior, occurs 1116.
- John, occurs 1145.
- Henry, occurs 1205 and 1206.
- Robert, occurs 1222.
- Hasculph, occurs 1224, 1235 and 1240.
- John, occurs 1246 and 1259.
- Simon, occurs 1281.
- Richard, occurs 1290 and 1295.
- John de Colum.
- Richard le Brom, occurs 1323.
- John, occurs 1326 and 1338.
- Thomas Sakkot, died 1361.
- John, occurs 1363 and 1364.
- John Neylond, occurs 1374 and 1384, resigned 1391.
- John Okham, elected 1391, resigned 1393.
- William Westbrome, elected 1393, occurs 1412.
- William Colchester, occurs 1416.
- John Depyng, occurs 1424, resigned 1434.
- John, occurs 1437.
- Thomas Colman, occurs 1450.
- John Wardhous, occurs 1457.
- John Flyngaunt, occurs 1462.
- John Stampe, occurs 1497.
- William, occurs 1514.
- William Gooche, died 1527.
- Thomas Turner, elected 1527, the last prior.

== See also ==
- Order of St Augustine
- St John's Abbey, Colchester
- History of Colchester
