= Stephen Crisp =

Quaker activist and writer

Stephen Crisp (1628–1692) of Colchester, England, was a Quaker activist, "traveller in the Ministry" and prolific writer.

== Evangelism ==
Crisp is credited with establishing the Quaker faith in the Low Countries. There was a Dutch expatriate community in Colchester and his mother and second wife were Dutch.

In 1683 he bought the ancient St Helen's Chapel and gave it to the Colchester Quakers.

== Publications ==
As listed in the British Library catalogue:

- A Backslider reproved, and his Folly made manifest, and his Confusions and Contradictions discovered. In a short reply to a book lately published by Robert Cobbet, called a Word to the Upright..., 1669
- A Faithful Warning? Exhortation to Friends: to beware of seducing spirits; and to keep on the armour of light, in simplicity and sincerity, as their best armour in all tryals..., 1684
- A memorable account of the Christian experiences..., 1694
- A New Book for Children to learn in. With many wholsome meditations for them to consider..., 1681
- A Plain Path-way opened to the Simple-hearted, for the answering all doubts and objections which do arise in them against the light and truth in the inward-parts; by which many are kept from obedience, and so from peace in their panting souls, 1668
- A Short History of a Long Travel from Babylon to Bethel. 7th ed., London, 1766
- A Word in Due Season: or Some harvest meditations, with a warning... from the Lord God to all people in England, to leave off their wicked and foolish customs in their harvest..., 1666
- A Word of Reproof to the Teachers of the World. Which may be of use for the tryal of their wayes..., 1658
- [Addresse charitable aux Francois refugiez, appellez Protestants.] Charitable Advice: in a letter to the French Protestants, into whatsoever parts of the world dispers'd, by reason of their present sufferings and persecutions, from the hands of the Roman Catholicks... Translated out of the French, etc. [The translator's epistle to the reader signed: J. F.] 1688
- An Alarum sounded in the Borders of Spiritual Egypt, which shall be heard in Babylon, and astonish the inhabitants of the defiled and polluted habitations of the earth..., 1671
- An Epistle of Tender Counsel and Advice to all that have believed the Truth, to exhort them to faithfulness thereunto..., a new edition, 1787
- An Epistle to Friends, concerning the present and succeeding times. Being a faithful exhortation and warning to all Friends, who profess the truth, to beware of the manifold wiles of the enemy, and to stand armed in the light of the Lord God..., 1666
- Captive sinners set free by Jesus Christ. A sermon preached... at the Quakers meeting-house, near Devonshire-Square, London..., 1786
- Christ all in all: opened in a sermon preached by Stephen Crisp... taken in short-hand as it was delivered... in the meeting-house of the people call'd Quakers... together with his prayer after sermon, 3rd ed., 1761
- The Christian Experiences, Gospel Labours and Writings of ... Stephen Crisp [An 1850 edition of "A Memorable Account of the Christian Experiences... of Stephen Crisp", 1694)
- The Christian's pathway. Extracted principally from a letter by Stephen Crisp, dated 1668 [i. e. from A Plain-pathway opened to the simple-hearted, etc.], 1855
- The Copy of a Letter written from Germany by Steven Crisp to Friends..., 1687
- De Gronden en oorsaecken, van de ellende der Nederlanden ontdeckt, als mede de middelen van derselver herstellinge aengewezen..., 1672
- De Waerheydt triumpherende over valscheyt, in een antwoort op dertig valsche beschuldigingen, tegens het onnosele Volck Gods, Quakers genaemt: in een seecker boeck genaemt's Werelts Godsdiensten, geschreven door Alexander Rosse, ende overgeset in de Nederduytsche tael door Josua Sanderus..., 1670
- De Weg to?t het Koningryk der Hemelen, aangeweezen in zeventien predikacien... Uyt het Engelsch [of “Several Sermons or Declarations”] vertaald door Wm Sewel, 1695
- Den Toetsteen getoetst en valsch bevonden, ende aen stucken gebroken. Ende de standaert der waerheyt verdediget. In antwoordt tot een kleyn boeckje, genaemt een Toetsteen, vol groote leugenen ende valsche beschuldigingen tegen het onnoosele Volck Gods, Quakers genaemt. Door Hendrick Claesz. Hitscher, etc..., 1670 (?)
- Een Geklanck des allarms, geblaesen binnen de landtpaelen van 't Geestelijck Egypten; t'welck gehoort sal worden in Babylon..., 1671
- Een Klaeginghe over de stadt van Groeningen. Beneven een antwoort, op vier papieren geschreven, tegen het volck genaemt Quakers, etc. (Voor de tweede mael gedruckt), 1669
- Een klaren wegh, geopent, voor de eenvoudighe van harten... (Den tweeden druk), 1670
- Een Send-Brief aen de Vrienden in Holland..., 1674
- Een Vrage aen de Mennonisten gedaen, ende besonderlijck aen de geene die Noort-hollant woonen... 1670 (?)
- Een Waerachtigh verhael, van een afgrijselijcke leugen; ende het selve veroordeelt, met den Vader, of Maecker, des selfs, we hy oock zy, 1670 (?)
- Het Eerste deel, van de Vytroepinge tegens de vervolginge, dewelcke begonnen is, en voortgaet door de regeerders, predicanten, en mennisten in Vrieslandt. (Het Tweede deel ... Met een verdediginge van de waerheydt van het eerste deel, etc.), 1670
- Scripture-truths demonstrated: in thirty two sermons, or declarations of Mr. Stephen Crisp..., 1707
- The Second Volume of the Sermons or Declarations of Mr. Stephen Crisp..., 1693
- Several Sermons or Declarations of Mr. Stephen Crisp..., 1694
- Several Sermons or Declarations of Mr. Stephen Crisp... Exactly taken-in characters or short-hand, as they were delivered by him at the publick meeting-houses of the people called Quakers, in Grace-Church-street, and Devonshire-House, London.... Together with his prayer at the end of every sermon, 1693
- Stephen Crisp, his Testimony concerning James Parnel, 1675
- Steven Crisp and his Correspondents, 1657–1692, being a synopsis of the letters in the Colchester collection. Edited, with notes and an introduction, by C. Fell Smith. [With plates], 1892
- The Christian's pathway. Extracted principally from a letter by Stephen Crisp, dated 1668 [i. e. from A Plain-pathway opened to the simple-hearted...], 1871
- The Third and Last Volume of the Sermons of Mr. Stephen Crisp... Containing XII. declarations upon several divine subjects..., 1694
- Thirty Sermons or, Declarations, on Various Subjects... [an edition in one volume of Several Sermons, etc., The Second Volume of the Sermons, and Third and Last Volume of the Sermons], 1745 (?)

== Sources ==
- Davies, Adrian. "Crisp, Stephen (1628–1692)". Oxford Dictionary of National Biography (online ed.). Oxford University Press. doi:10.1093/ref:odnb/6707. (Subscription or UK public library membership required.)
- Philadelphia Yearly Meeting Christian Faith & Practice Biographical notes
- Victoria County History of Essex, Vol. 9: referring to S.H. G. Fitch, Colchester Quakers, 97
- Claus Bernet (2006). "Stephen Crisp". In Bautz, Traugott (ed.). Biographisch-Bibliographisches Kirchenlexikon (BBKL) (in German). Vol. 26. Nordhausen: Bautz. cols. 248–264. ISBN 3-88309-354-8.
