= History of Colchester =

The history of Colchester as a city dates to the 1st century BC, when the Celtic fortress of Camulodunon was built by the Trinovantes tribe. As such, Colchester is regarded as the oldest recorded town in Britain. Following the Roman conquest of Britain in 43 AD, a legionary fortress was established on the site, and the name was Latinised as Camulodunum. In 49 AD the fortress became a town, was formally renamed Colonia Victricensis, and was designated as the capital of the Roman province of Britannia. In c. 60–61 AD, Camulodunum was razed during the Boudican revolt. Following this the capital was moved to Londinium. Camulodunum was rebuilt, and continued to be an important city throughout the Roman period.

Following the withdrawal of the Roman Empire from Britain, Camulodunum contracted significantly. It began to reemerge as an Anglo-Saxon town, Colenceaster, in the late Anglo-Saxon period. It fell under Viking control in 879, but was recaptured by Edward the Elder in 917. The aftermath of the Norman Conquest saw the stone keep of Colchester Castle built in the middle of the town.

In the medieval period, Colchester became home to several monastic foundations including St John's Abbey and St Botolph's Priory. Following the Black Death, Colchester began to emerge as a prominent town in the Medieval English wool trade, and received a large wave of immigration from Flemish wool merchants, leading to the creation of the town's Dutch Quarter. Colchester was besieged during the English Civil War.

== Prehistory ==
The gravel hill upon which Colchester is built was formed in the Middle Pleistocene period, and was shaped into a terrace between the Anglian glaciation and the Ipswichian glaciation by an ancient precursor to the River Colne. From these deposits beneath the town have been found Palaeolithic flint tools, including at least six Acheulian handaxes. Further flint tools made by hunter gatherers living in the Colne Valley during the Mesolithic have been discovered, including a Tranchet axe from Middlewick. In the 1980s an archaeological inventory showed that over 800 sherds of pottery from the Neolithic, Bronze Age and early Iron Age have been found within Colchester, along with many examples of worked flint. This included a pit found at Culver Street containing a ritually placed Neolithic grooved ware pot, and other find spots containing fragments of later Deverel-Rimbury bucket urns. Further Neolithic finds were uncovered in 2010 during archaeological excavations of the former Goojerat Barracks. Colchester is surrounded by Neolithic and Bronze Age monuments that pre-date the town, including a Neolithic henge at Tendring, large Bronze Age barrow cemeteries at Dedham and Langham, and a larger example at Brightlingsea consisting of a cluster of 22 barrows. Five Bronze Age barrow mounds remain near the University of Essex on the north-east outskirts of the town, although the building of the railway line between Colchester and Clacton-on-Sea in the 1850s may have destroyed more.

== Iron Age fortress and Roman Colonia ==
=== Iron Age Camulodunon ===
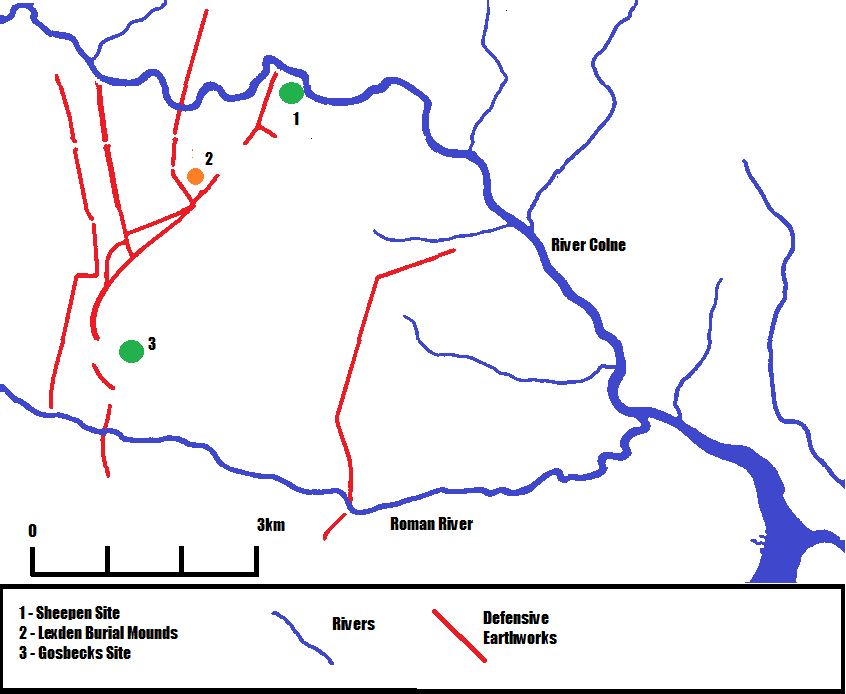
The Iron Age site of Camulodunon

The Celtic fortress of "Camulodunon", meaning Stronghold of Camulos is first mentioned on coins minted by Tasciovanus in the period 20-10BC. Camulodunon consisted of a series of earthwork defences, built from the 1st century BC onwards with most dating from the 1st century AD. They are considered the most extensive of their kind in Britain The defences are made up of lines of ditches and ramparts, possibly palisaded with gateways, that mostly run parallel to each other in a north–south direction. The Iron Age settlement was protected by rivers on three sides, with the River Colne bounding the site to the north and east, and the Roman River valley forming the southern boundary; the earthworks were mostly designed to close off the western gap between these two river valleys. Other earthworks closed off eastern parts of the settlement. The main sites within the bounds of these defences are the Gosbecks farmstead, a large high-status settlement with associated religious site, the Sheepen river port and industrial area near the present location of St Helena School and the Lexden burial mounds, a group of barrows and cremation burials. Originally Camulodunon was a stronghold of the Trinovantes tribe, led by kings such as Addedomarus, but at some point in the 1st century AD the aristocracy and ruling families were from the Catuvellauni tribe.

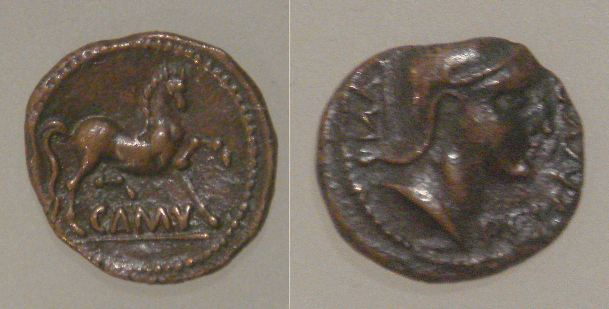
Bronze coin of Cunobelin – note the letters CAMV for Camulodunon

Strabo reports Rome's lucrative trade with Britain; the island's exports included grain, gold, silver, iron, hides, slaves and hunting dogs. Iron ingots, slave chains and storage vessels discovered at the Sheepen site at Camulodunon appear to confirm this trade with the empire. The Catuvellauni king Cunobelinus, ruling from his capital at Camulodunon, had subjugated a large area of southern and eastern Britain, and was called by the Roman historian Suetonius "King of the Britons". Under his rule Camulodunon had replaced Verlamion as the most important settlement in pre-Roman Britain. Around 40AD he had fallen out with his son Adminius (acting as proxy ruler of the Cantiaci tribe in his father's name), who had fled to Rome for support. There he was received by the Emperor Gaius, who may have attempted an invasion of Britain to put Adminius on his father's throne. After Cunobelinus’ death (circa 40AD) his sons took power, with Togodumnus the eldest ruling the Catuvellauni homeland around Verlamion, and Caratacus ruling from Camulodunon. Together these brothers began expanding their influence over other British tribes, including the Atrebates of the south coast. Verica, king of the Atrebates, which had branches on both sides of the English Channel and had been friends of Rome since Caesar's conquest, appealed to the Emperor Claudius for aid. At the time of this appeal in 43 AD, the newly enthroned Emperor Claudius was in need of a military victory in order to secure his shaky position with the military, and saw this call for help as the perfect pretext. Aulus Plautius led the four Roman legions across to Britain with Camulodunon being their main target, defeating and killing Togodumnus near the Thames and then waiting for Claudius to cross the Channel. Claudius arrived with reinforcements, including artillery and elephants, leading the attack on Camulodunon. Caratacus fled the storming of the town, taking refuge with the Ordovices and Silures tribes in Wales and becoming a Welsh folk hero for his resistance to Rome. The Roman historian Suetonius and Claudius' triumphal arch state that after this battle the British kings who had been under Cunobelinus’ sons’ control surrendered without further bloodshed, Claudius accepting their submission in Camulodunon.

=== Roman Camulodunum ===
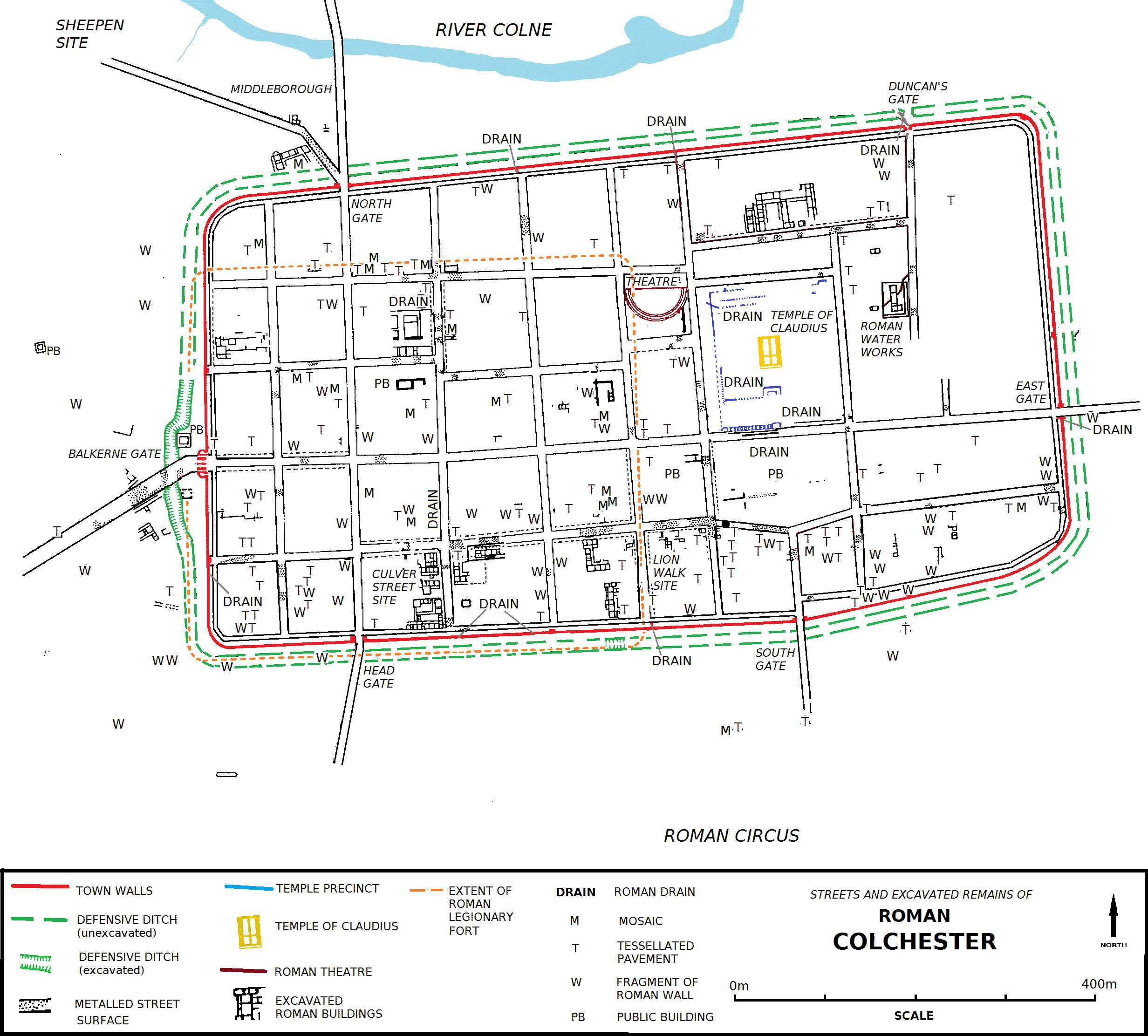
Map of the walled town of Roman Colchester (Colonia Victricensis or Camulodunum)

A Roman legionary fortress or castrum, the first permanent legionary fortress to be built in Britain, was established within the confines of Camulodunon (which was Latinised as Camulodunum) following the successful invasion in 43AD, and was home to the Twentieth Legion. After the legion was withdrawn in c. 49 AD, the legionary defences were dismantled and the fortress converted into a town, with many of the barrack blocks converted into housing. Its official name became Colonia Victricensis, and discharged Roman soldiers making up the population. Tacitus wrote that the town was "a strong colonia of ex-soldiers established on conquered territory, to provide a protection against rebels and a centre for instructing the provincials in the procedures of the law". A Roman monumental temple, the largest classical style temple in Britain, was built there in the 50sAD and was dedicated to Emperor Claudius on his death in 54AD. The podium of the temple has been incorporated into the Norman castle, and represents "the earliest substantial stone building of Roman date visible in the country". A monumental arch was built from tufa and Purbeck Marble at the western gate out of the town. Tombs lined the roads out of the town, with several belonging to military veterans, with the most famous being those of Longinus Sdapeze and Marcus Favonius Facilis.

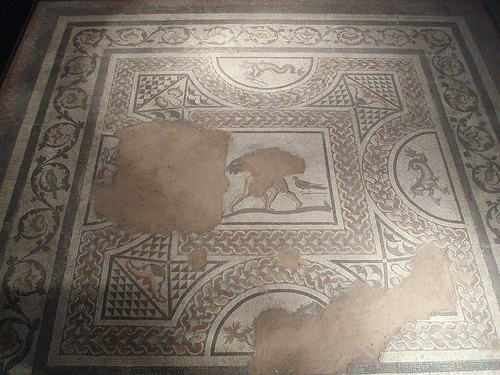
Roman Mosaic found at the Middleborough House, Colchester

The city was the capital of the Roman province of Britannia, and its temple (the largest classical-style temple in Britain) was the centre of the Imperial Cult. But tensions arose between the Roman colonists and the native British population in 60/61AD, when the Roman authorities used the death of Iceni king Prasutagus as a pretext for seizing the Iceni client state from his widow Boudica. The Iceni rebels were joined by the Trinovantes around Colonia Victricensis, who held several grudges against the Roman population of the town. These included the seizure of land for the colonia's veteran population, the use of labour to build the Temple of Claudius, and the sudden recall of loans given to the local elites by leading Romans (including Seneca and the Emperor), which had been needed to allow the locals to qualify for a position on the city council. The Procurator Catus Decianus was especially despised. As the symbol of Roman rule in Britain the city was the first target of the rebels, with its Temple seen in British eyes as the "arx aeternae dominationis" ("stronghold of everlasting domination") according to Tacitus. He wrote that it was undefended by fortifications when it was attacked The rebels destroyed the city and slaughtered its population. Archaeologists have found layers of ash in the site of the city, suggesting that Boudica ordered her rebel army to burn the city to the ground. After the defeat of the uprising, the Procurator of the Roman province moved to the newly established commercial settlement of Londinium (London).

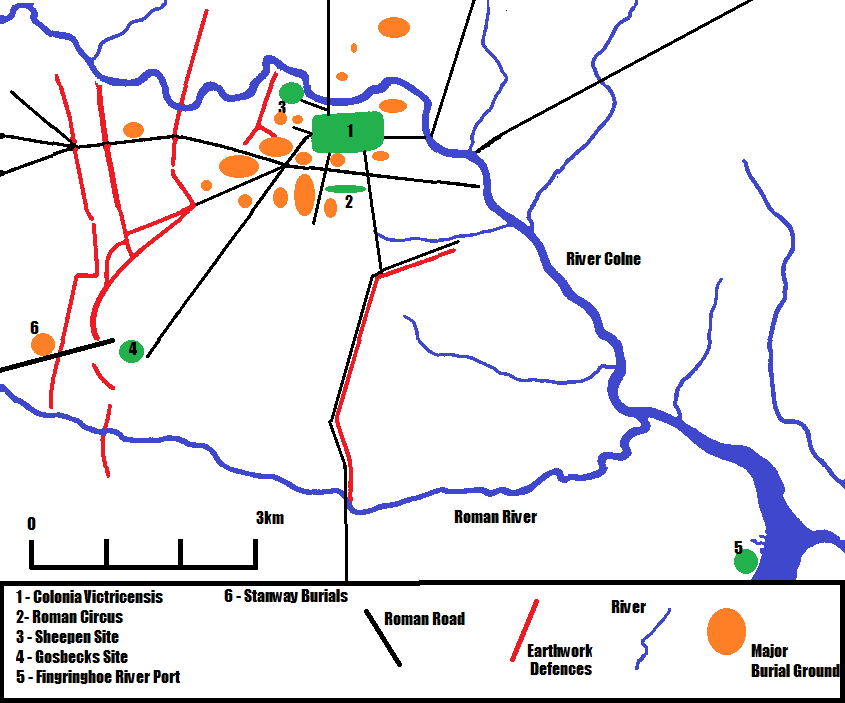
The Roman colonia of Colonia Victricensis in its wider landscape

Following the destruction of the Colonia and Suetonius Paulinus’ crushing of the revolt the town was rebuilt on a larger scale and flourished, growing larger in size than its pre-Boudican levels (to 108 acres/45 ha) despite its loss of status to Londinium, reaching its peak in the 2nd and 3rd centuries. The town's official name was Colonia Claudia Victricensis (City of Claudius’ Victory), but it was known colloquially by contemporaries as Camulodunum or simply Colonia.

The colonia became a large industrial centre, and was the largest, and for a short time the only, place in the province of Britannia where samian ware was produced, along with glasswork and metalwork, and a coin mint. Roman brick making and wine growing also took place in the area. Colonia Victricensis contained many large townhouses, with dozens of mosaics and tessellated pavements found, along with hypocausts and sophisticated waterpipes and drains. The town was home to a large classical Temple, two theatres (including Britain's largest), several Romano-British temples, Britain's only known chariot circus, Britain's first town walls, several large cemeteries and over 50 known mosaics. It may have reached a population of 30,000 at its height (in the third and early fourth century).

However, the late 3rd and 4th centuries saw a series of crises in the empire, including the breakaway Gallic Empire (of which Britain was a part), and raids by Saxon pirates, both of which lead to the creation of the Saxon Shore forts along the east coast of Britain. The fort at Othona overlooking the confluence of the Blackwater and Colne estuaries, and two more at the mouth of the river into the colonia were built to protect the town. Balkerne Gate (Britain's oldest remaining Roman gateway) and Duncan's Gate were both blocked up in this period, with the later showing signs of being attacked. The extramural suburbs outside of Balkerne Gate had gone by 300 and were replaced by cultivation beds. The re-cutting of the town ditch in front of the newly blocked Balkerne Gate in 275–300 involved destroying the water pipes which entered the colonia through the gate.

As with many towns in the empire, the colonia shrunk in size in the 4th century but continued to function as an important town. Although houses tended to shrink in size, with 75% of the large townhouses being replaced by smaller buildings by c. 350, in the period 275 to 325 a weak "building boom" (the "Constantinian renaissance") occurred in the town, with new houses being built and old ones reshaped. Many of the towns mosaics date from this period, including the famous Lion Walk mosaic. Late Roman robber trenches have been found at some sites for removing and salvaging tessellated floors and tiles for reuse in later houses. The pottery industry in the town had declined significantly by 300, but the 4th century did see an increase in the bone-working industry for making furniture and jewellery, and evidence of blown glass making has also been found. Large areas of the Southern part of the town were given over to agriculture. Despite the scaling down of private buildings an increase in the size and grandeur of public buildings occurs in the period 275–400. The Temple of Claudius and its associated temenos buildings were reconstructed in the early-4th century, along with the possible forum-basilica building to the south of it. The Temple appears to have had a large apsidal hall built across the front of the podium steps, with numismatic dating evidence taking the date of the building up to at least 395. A large hall at the Culver Street site, dated 275–325 to 400+, may have been a large centralised storage barn for taxes paid in kind with grain. During this period the late Roman church at Butt Road just outside the town walls was built with its associated cemetery containing over 650 graves (some containing fragments of Chinese silk), and may be one of the earliest churches in Britain. A strong numismatic chronology has been obtained from the over 500 coins found at the site, and puts its date from 320 to c. 425.

=== Sub-Roman Town ===
The formal collapse of Roman administration in the province occurred in the years 409–411. Activity in the 5th century continued in Camulodunum at a much reduced level, with evidence of at the Butt Road site showing that it briefly carrying on into the early 5th century.

Several burials within the town's walls have been dated to the 5th century. These include two burials discovered at East Hill House in 1983, which have been surgically decapitated (in a fashion found in both Pre-Roman and some early pagan-Saxon burial practices), and other burials cut into the 4th century barn at Culver Street. A skeleton of a young woman found stretched out on a Roman mosaic floor at Beryfield, within the SE corner of the walled town, was initially interpreted as a victim of a Saxon attack on the Sub-Roman town; however, it is now believed that the burial is a post-Roman grave cut down to the hard floor surface (the name Beryfield means Burial field, a reference to the medieval graveyards in the area). As well as burials, coin hoards from the late Fourth and early Fifth centuries have been found, including a hoard minted in the reign of Constantine III (reigned 407–411) from Artillery Folly, that are heavily clipped; this clipping must have occurred in the years after they were minted and so would have happened in the 5th century. Post-Roman/early Saxon burials from the 5th, 6th and 7th centuries, some buried with weapons, have been found outside of the walls in the areas of former Roman cemeteries, suggesting a continuity of practice. Scattered structures have also been excavated by archaeologists, such as a mid-5th-century dwelling at Lion Walk, as well as 5th-century loam weights and cruciform-brooches found across the town. At the Culver Street site a thin layer of early Saxon pottery was discovered along with two dwellings. Other circumstantial evidence of activity includes large post-Roman rubbish dumps, which suggest nearby occupation by Romano-Britons. The existence of a post-Roman entity centred on the town, sometimes linked to the legend of Camelot, has been argued and was first proposed by archaeologist Mortimer Wheeler.

== Saxon and Viking era ==
=== Fifth to eighth centuries ===
Archaeological evidence shows that the post-Roman, but pre-Saxon, settlement of the early 5th century gave way from about 440–450 to a culture that was overwhelmingly Saxon in its character. This appears to have taken the form of a small community centred largely around Head Street and the High Street, both of which roughly follow the course of the two former main Roman streets in the town. During this period London was the capital of the Kingdom of Essex (founded c.527), although Colchester may have been an important local centre for the north of Essex. Evidence for Saxons from the fifth to eighth centuries consists of a 5th-century hut at Lion Walk, two huts from Culver Street dating to the 7th century, burials (including warrior graves) found around and within the town which date from 400 to 700, including those on Magdalen Street and the seventh and eighth century burials to the north-east of Castle Park, brooches and loomweights from the fifth to seventh centuries, coins from the seventh and eighth centuries, and scatters of pottery and other artefacts from various sites. There is a possibility that due to financial and time constraints on archaeological investigations from the 1960s–1980s that some Anglo-Saxon evidence may have been lost, with Saxon finds from the demolition of the Medieval Cups Hotel on the High Street suggesting that some structures or features were missed. The early Saxon river port was located to the south-east of the town, at Old Heath (Ealdehethe) and Blackheath (Heath, and the later name of Colchester's port Hythe, derive from Old English hetha, meaning a landing place) The Bishop of London's soke in the medieval town may have derived from an earlier Saxon privilege dating from the Kingdom of Essex. The Kingdom of the East Saxons has a very low presence in written historical accounts from the Saxon period, and Colchester does not appear explicitly in written accounts until 917. The History of the Britons traditionally ascribed to Nennius lists a Cair Colun among the 28 cities of Britain, which has been thought to indicate Colchester. Geoffrey of Monmouth similarly referenced it as Kaelcolim, while his contemporary Geoffrey Gaimar called it Kair Koel. The Saxon version of the current name of the town is first recorded as "Colenceaster" and "Colneceastre" during the 10th century.

=== Ninth to eleventh centuries ===
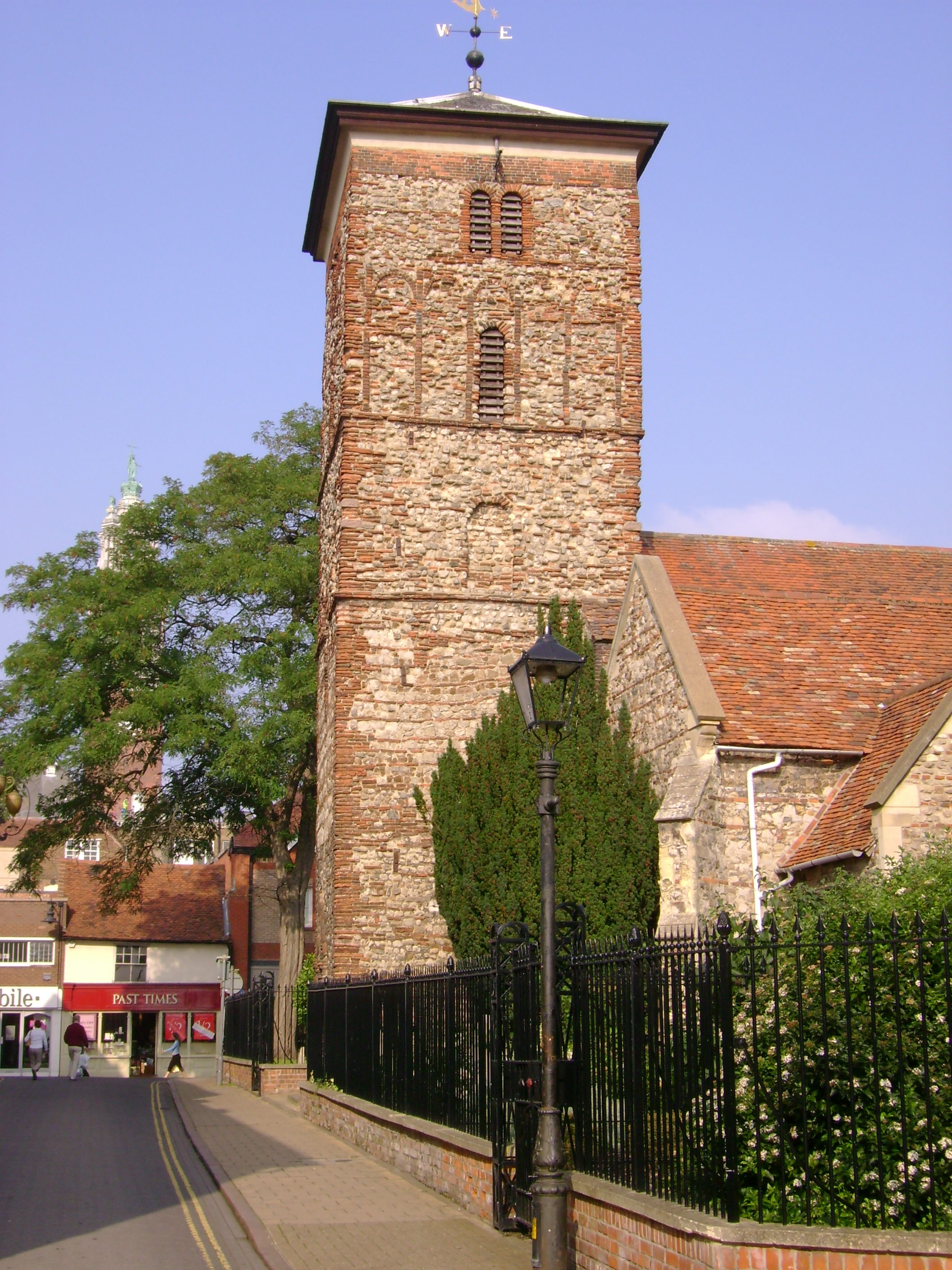
Trinity Church, Colchester with its 11th-century Saxon church tower

The isolated raids by Vikings in the first half of the 9th century took a far more serious turn in 865 when a great army of Danes under the command of Ivar the Boneless invaded the Kingdom of East Anglia. In 869 King Edmund of East Anglia was defeated and killed by the Danes and the east of England fell under Danish control. Under a peace treaty between Wessex and the Danes in 879, Colchester was incorporated in the Danelaw. Norfolk and Suffolk were heavily settled by the Danes as can be traced by the density of Scandinavian place names. North-East Essex was also colonised by the Danes, and Scandinavian place names such as Kirby and Thorpe are found around Colchester. Scandinavian names are found later amongst the town's residents, and Scandinavian style weapons have been dredged from the Colne, although these might be Late Saxon or Norman. 9th century graves of the town's inhabitants have been discovered in the vicinity of St Marys at the Walls in the south-west corner of the town.

The Kings of Wessex waged continual war on the Danes and finally Colchester was recaptured by English armies under Edward the Elder in 917. The Anglo-Saxon Chronicle states that after liberating Maldon, Edward's army:

"Went to Colchester, and beset the town, and fought thereon till they took it, and slew all the people, and seized all that was therein; except those men who escaped therefrom over the wall."

Following successful battles against the Viking armies, Edward returned to Colchester:

"After this, the same year, before Martinmas, went King Edward with the West-Saxon army to Colchester; and repaired and renewed the town, where it was broken down before."

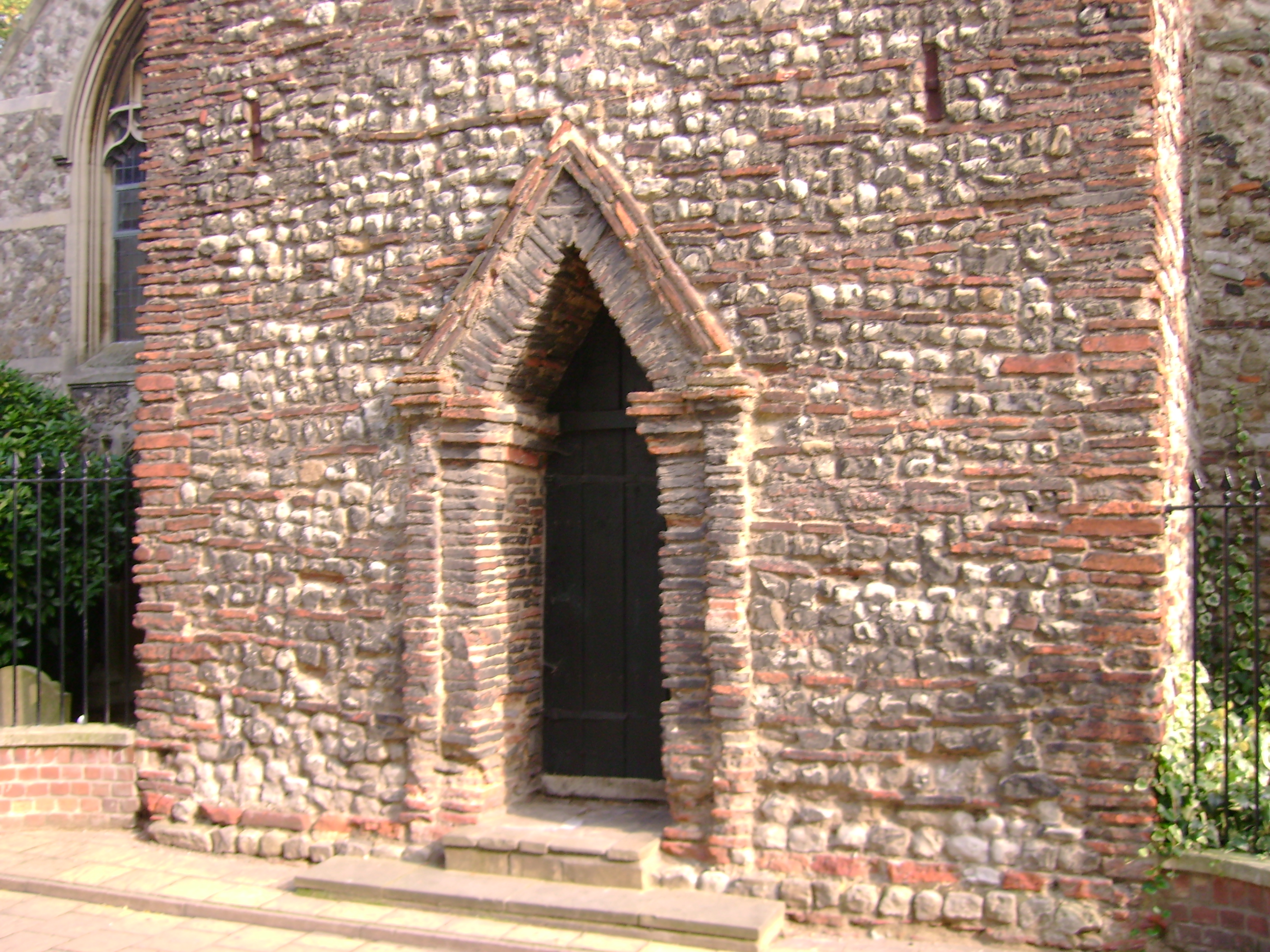
Saxon doorway of Trinity Church. Note the Roman tiles reused in its construction

After being restored to English rule by Edward the Elder the settlement at Colchester flourished into a prosperous small burh with a developed system of rights and privileges for its burgesses. However, its location (which was the result of its Iron Age and Roman origins) several miles up-river placed it in a poor position to exploit naval trade lanes, and the town was overshadowed in this respect by Maldon and the newer town of Ipswich in Suffolk. A new port at the present Hythe improved the situation somewhat, and the town shows an increase in foreign trade during the 10th century and a mint from 991. Witans were held in the town by Edward's successors, Æthelstan in 931 and Edmund I in 940. Æthelstan described Colchester as a Town well known to all men, and his Witan included 13 ealdormen, 37 thegns, 15 bishops, the Archbishop of Canterbury and the Bishop of Chester-le-Street. Six of the town's churches date from the Saxon period, and several more also might do. These are St Peter’s (which, with its central location close to the crossroads of Head and High Street may have been the main church in the Saxon period), Holy Trinity with its early 11th-century tower, St Martin's (whose tower also contains pre-Norman elements), the now demolished St Nicholas, All Saints and the now demolished St Runwald’s (which sat in the market square in front of the Moot Hall in the High Street). The three other candidates include St Mary-at-the-Walls (which contains 9th-century graves), an earlier church on the site of St Botolph's Priory (which supposedly had a tower similar to Holy Trinity's), and St John the Evangelist’s Church where St Botulph's Roundabout now sits was a Saxon church demolished by the Normans. St Helen's Chapel, built into the remains of the Roman Theatre on Maidenburgh Street, may also have had Saxon origins, as St Helen was often (erroneously) linked to the town in Saxon and later medieval folklore. A chapel (whose remains can be seen in front of the castle) and a 10th-century large hall were built in front of the still-standing ruins of the Temple of Claudius. The 10th-century town was at the heart of a large system of estates held by Essex ealdormen, holdings which were broken up by inheritance through the 11th century.

== Medieval era ==
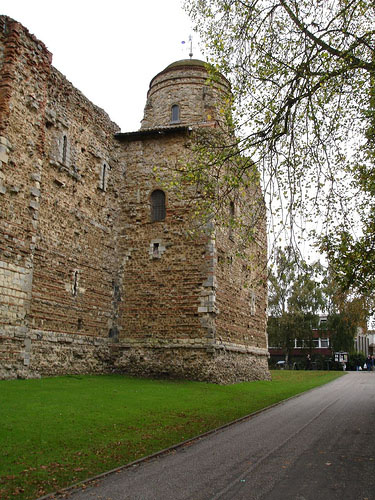
The Norman Colchester Castle, constructed over the vaults of the ruined Temple of Claudius

=== Norman Colchester ===
In the initial twenty years following the Norman conquest of England by William the Conqueror in 1066 Colchester suffered disproportionately under heavy tax burdens. The annual farm from the town in 1066 had been £15. 5s. 3d., but by 1086 it had risen to an extortionate £80. Only Rochester saw a bigger increase, putting Colchester joint fifth in terms of annual payments with Wallingford behind London, York and Lincoln (joint second), and Norwich. But by 1130 this burden had been reduced to £40. In 1069 a Danish fleet unsuccessfully attacked the east coast of England, failing to take Dover, Sandwich, Ipswich and Norwich, although it appears to have severely damaged Colchester, with a second invasion scare in 1071. At this time (1069 or 1070) the town was given to the control of Eudo Dapifer (also known as Eudo de Rie after his Norman home town). The son of Hubert de Rie, he was William the Conqueror's Seneschal of Normandy, later serving the Conqueror's successors William II and Henry I, and owning 64 manors in Eastern England, including 50 houses and 40 acres of land in Colchester. Eudo directed the construction of Colchester Castle (c. 1073 – 1080) on the remains of the Temple of Claudius, as a royal rather than baronial castle, intending it to be at the centre of the defence of Eastern England. Construction on the castle, which is the largest Norman castle ever built and the first stone Keep in England, was initially halted in around 1075 and hastily fortified during a rebellion in East Anglia supported by a Danish Fleet, but resumed shortly afterwards to be given to Eudo in 1089. Henry I later renewed this right in 1101, granting the "turrim and castelum" to Eudo in a charter. Under Eudo the town prospered, reaching a population of 2,500 (putting it in the middle rank of English towns). The town, and its turbulent history, was described sometime between 1087 and 1100 as:

"The city of Colchester is placed in the eastern part of Britain, a city near to a port, pleasantly situated, watered on every side by abundant springs, with a very healthy air, built with very strong walls; a city to be reckoned amongst the most eminent, had not time, fires, floods, incursions of pirates, and various strokes of misfortune obliterated all the monuments of the city."

Eudo endowed the town with several religious institutions. The foremost of these was St. John's Abbey (built 1095–1116), built close to the site of the Saxon church of St John the Evangelist, discovered during the creation of St Botolph's Roundabout. Stephan, Abbot of York, sent 13 monks to Essex to inhabit the abbey, with Pope Paschal II granting a petition to make their leader Hugh the first abbot of the abbey in 1104. The Abbot of Colchester had a seat in the House of Lords. Also in 1104 the abbey was granted the right to hold a fair on St John's Green outside of the abbey grounds. Upon Eudo's death in 1120 on his estate at Préaux in Normandy his remains were brought to England to be interred at the abbey on 28 February 1120. The abbey underwent reconstruction in 1133 after a large fire which had consumed part of the town affected the building. A large precinct wall was constructed around the abbey in the 12th century, some of which still stands along the north end of Mersea Road despite a 140m stretch of it being pulled down in the 1970s for the creation of a roundabout. As a Benedictine monastery lay folk were not permitted within the abbey, and so the parish church of St Giles was built on the edge of the Abbey's precinct to serve them in 1171. Although the church still stands as the Colchester Masonic Centre, large portions of the associated graveyard and earlier Roman features were removed and destroyed by building contractors with little archaeological investigation during the creation of a car park in the 1970s and 1980s. Eudo also founded the Hospital of St Mary Magdalen in 1100. This was built in the north-west corner of the junction between what is now Magdalen Street and Brook Street, deliberately placing it outside of the walled town to keep the leper patients away from the healthy population. This hospital was controlled by St John's Abbey, who paid for the upkeep of its inmates with an annual sum of £6 from the Abbey's estate in Brightlingsea. As the hospital had its own monks and officials the Abbey's level of control became a matter of dispute during the latter Middle Ages. In 1189 the monks at the hospital were granted the right to hold their own fair. Eudo is also supposed to have rebuilt the Saxon Chapel of St Helena, which was built into the remains of the Roman Theatre on Maidenburgh Street, and to have improved the port at the Hythe.

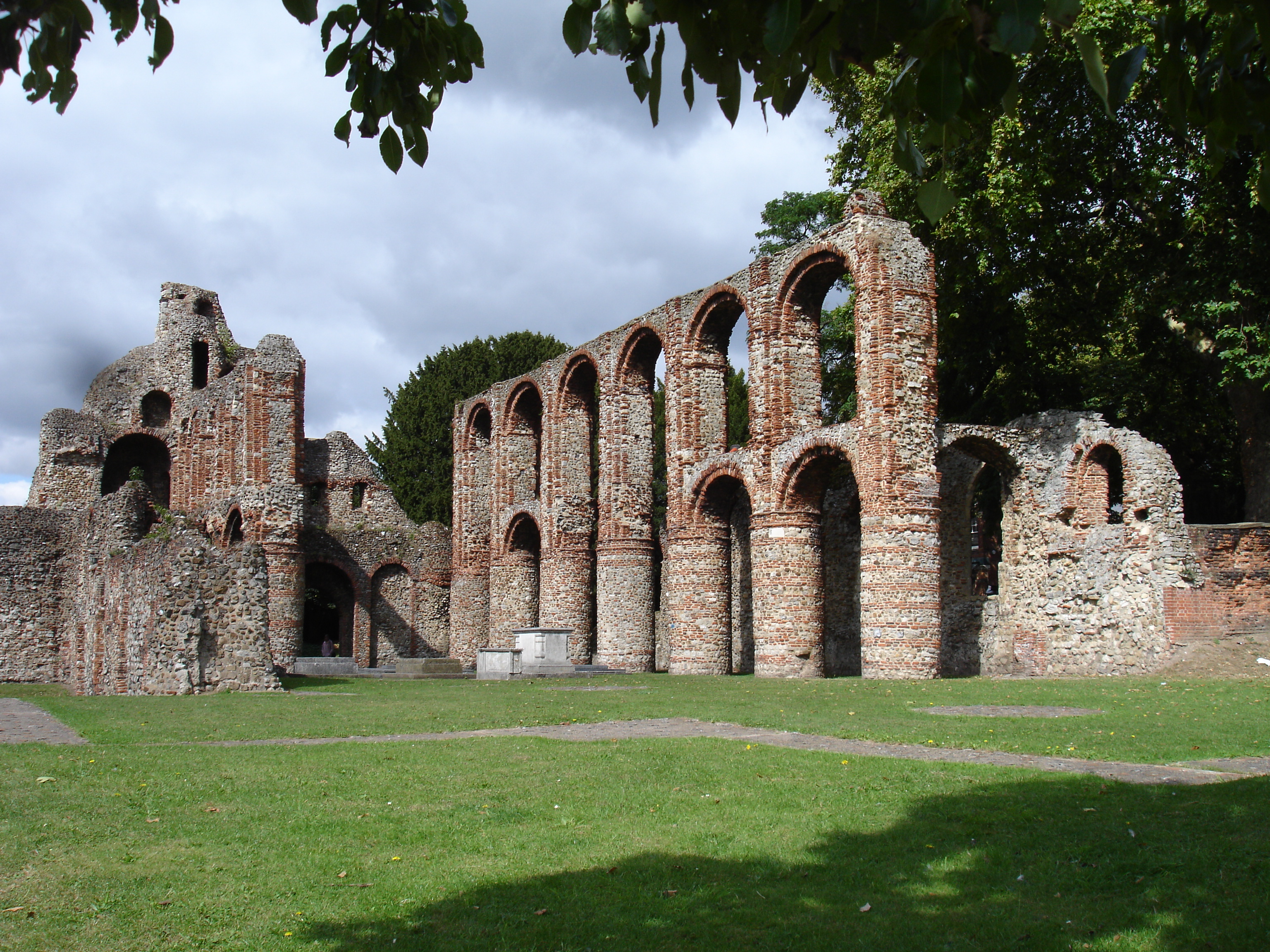
The ruined nave of the St Botolph's Priory church

Unrelated to Eudo, but contemporary with him, was the construction of the first Augustinian monastery in Britain at St Botolph's Priory outside of South Gate close to the abbey. The Priory was originally the site of a Saxon church in honour of St Botolph which housed some of his relics, and also Saint Denis. Pope Pascal II granted a priest called Ainulf, the leader of a group of priests at the church who had all studied the Austin rites in France, the rite to found the Priory, which in August 1116 was granted control over all of the Augustinian monasteries in England. The Priory was granted the right to hold a fair on the feast day of St Denis (9 October). However, despite the Priories eminent position it was relatively poor in comparison to the Abbey of St John. Secular buildings in the Norman town included the Moot Hall which was significantly rebuilt in 1160, which was unusual in its appearance for non-religious structures of the period due to the extravagant nature of its decorations, making it perhaps the most decorated secular building in the country in the 11th century. These included a carved stone door and carved windows created by the same mason who worked on Rochester Cathedral and Dover Priory, featuring carvings of King Solomon and The Queen of Sheba (emblematic of the wise judgements of the courts held in the Hall). Other secular buildings made from Roman rubble include the numerous Stone houses built around the town. Many of these 11th-century dwellings were demolished in the 1970s, including one on Lion Walk and one behind what is now the JobCentre. Numerous robber trenches and demolition pits from this period have been found around the town from which the Roman building material for these structures was mined, as well as large complexes of lime kilns built from Roman tiles for baking oyster shells to obtain lime for mortar.

The town's merchant fleet trade with the continent, with corn shipments from Colchester reported in Holland. Four moneyers operated in the town under William I, William II, Henry I and King Stephen, although by 1157 this had been reduced to one and to none by 1166. Iron working and pottery production occurred within the town, with a large series of pottery kilns producing Thetford-type ware and early medieval ware found at Mile End and Middleborough. Pottery datable to the Anglo-Norman period is relatively rare in England although not in Colchester. The town's burgesses had developed a corporate identity with established rights and responsibilities before they were enshrined in the 1189 Charter. These privileges included substantial common land grazing rights, fishing rights, the right to hunt foxes, hares and cats, common-ownership of the river bank and the protection of the town's market against unauthorised markets. These last two privileges were unique to Colchester amongst English towns. The townsfolk were also exempt from paying to billet visiting royals and dignitaries, paying Scot, Lot and Danegeld, and could reclaim money paid as tolls at other towns. Together the townspeople held 1,304 acres of land in parcels of 1 to 10 acres, whilst other land and houses in and around the town were owned by the Lords of local manors around Essex. Bury St Edmunds in Suffolk held 30 acres, and a wic at Mile End.

The town hosted King Henry II for a week in May 1157 after his crown-wearing at Bury St Edmunds, with his entourage which included the Archbishop of York, the Archbishop of Canterbury, the Bishops of London, Lincoln, Chichester, and Exeter, the Earl of Leicester, the Earl of Salisbury, Warin FitzGerald (a local Essex lord) and the Lord Chancellor Thomas Becket. Elements of the army to oppose Hugh Bigod's rebellion assembled at Colchester in 1173.

=== High medieval history ===
Colchester was the largest town in Essex throughout the entire Middle Ages and was initially the principal town of the county, with its castle being home to the High Sheriff of Essex and the County Jail. In 1204 the town's port at the Hythe was rated by its subsidy payments (£16. 8s. p.a.) as the 19/20th largest out of the 30 audited, ahead of local rivals Norwich, Ipswich, Dunwich and Orford, yet less than half that of Great Yarmouth, although this port status was short-lived. However it slowly lost its status during the 13th century to Chelmsford, which from 1202 to 1203 held the Royal Justices, and the Justices in Eyre from 1218.

In the early 13th century Colchester became embroiled in the First Barons' War. King John, who had visited the town several times in 1204, 1205, 1209, 1212 and 1214, had to send forces to besiege and take the castle from Baronial supporters in 1216, with King John himself arriving in the town later in March. However, later in the year a baronial army attacked and ravaged the town. The town received further royal visits from Henry III in 1242 and 1256, who stayed in his Royal Quarters in the Castle. Several Colchester men were implicated in the baronial conspiracies against him in the 1250s.

The thirteenth and early fourteenth centuries also saw a series of conflicts between the burgesses of the town and St. John's Abbey and several local lords over the infringements of their charter rights. In 1253, following long-standing dispute over access to the free warren in West Donyland and the extent of the Abbot's jurisdiction, a group of forty Colcestrians attacked and destroyed the Abbey's gallows and tumbrels at Greenstead to the east of the town, before cutting the ropes of the Abbey's ships at Brightlingsea. By 1255 these particular disagreements were settled, although an anti-abbey riot broke out at the Midsummers Fair in 1272. Then in 1312 the townspeople became entangled in disputes with the powerful FitzWalter family, lords of Lexden manor and close relations of the Plantagenets, when they began trespassing and hunting on Baron Robert FitzWalter's private estates as well as contesting the extent of his jurisdiction and control of pastureland. In 1319 a group of 174 Colcestrians attacked servants and tenants of Essex lord Hugh de Neville who was gathering supplies and men for the Scottish war, and in 1324 attacked John Dagworth Lord of Bradwell who was again attempting to raise men and arms. When Edward II was deposed in 1327 in the wake of the Scottish wars there was rioting and faction-squabbles in the town.

Further local disputes with the Lexden FitzWalters occurred in 1342, when a Lexden man was killed in an argument at Mile End to the north of the town; Lord John FitzWalter believed that the Colchester coroner would be biased in favour of the Colcestrian defendants, and so called on the County coroner at Chelmsford to conduct the enquiry which in turn angered the townsfolk who saw the intervention of the County coroner as an infringement of their Charter rights. However, when both the Colchester and Chelmsford enquiries judged in favour of the defendants the enraged John FitzWalter called on his agents to attack any Colchester man found outside of the town, resulting in the death of a Colcestrian at Southminster and another on the road to Maldon. The violence increased when the FitzWalters blockaded the town between 20 May and 22 June until they were bought off with £40 by the town. But the following year the situation deteriorated again, and so John FitzWalter once again besieged the town between 7 April and 1 June 1343 before being paid off with a further £40. A few years later in 1349 Lionel of Bradenham, Lord of Langenhoe and a friend and tenant of John FitzWalter, began constructing six weirs in arms of the River Colne which obstructed fish movements (infringing the burgesses' charter-enshrined right to the River bank and fish stocks). The resulting dispute with the town led to him besieging it between August and November 1350, damaging Colchester's eastern suburbs and taking grain and hay from Greenstead, before he was bought off with £20. Lionel began illegally placing piles in the Colne in 1360, which led to the town excluding Langenhoe men from Colchester's markets. He was successfully prosecuted by the burgesses of Colchester in 1362.

In the winter of 1348–49 the Black Death struck the town, killing up to 1,500 people including the Abbot and Prior of St. John's Abbey by the time it began to die down in August 1349. A second bout struck the town in 1360–61. The plague had struck England in the middle of the Hundred Years' War, to which Colchester had sent five ships and 170 mariners to aid in the blockade of Calais in 1347–48.

=== Late medieval history ===
Despite the destruction caused by the Black Death the town entered a period of growth spurred by the cloth trade from the mid-14th century onwards, with 22 people admitted into the ranks of the burgesses every year in the 1350s during which time Edward III visited the town in 1354. By 1377 Colchester's population had reached 7,000, placing it Eighth in rank of English provincial towns, increasing to its medieval maximum of 9,000 by the early 15th century. Immigrants into the town came from across Essex, Suffolk, Norfolk, Cambridgeshire, London, Bristol, Gloucester, Ludlow, Canterbury, Sandwich, Manchester, Yorkshire, Kent, Wales, Ireland, Calais and later (foreshadowing the large-scale immigration in the 16th century) from the Low Countries. The first burgess to be explicitly stated as being Flemish was in 1451, although Flemish names occur in the town from much earlier.

Colchester was one of the centres of the Peasants' Revolt in 1381. One of the leaders of the Rebels, John Ball of St Albans, had been a priest in Colchester for a long period in the 1350s. On 13 June a large group of peasants gathered at Colchester from the surrounding Essex countryside before marching to Stepney in South Essex. Those who stayed behind attacked the Moot Hall and St John's Abbey on 15 and 16 June, forcing the law courts to shut for five weeks, and carried off the court rolls of the abbey. On 17 June a group of Stanway men carried off the court rolls of St Crosses hospital on Crouch Street. Following the defeat of the Rebels at Billericay by King Richard survivors flooded into the town, taking their anger out on Colchester's sizeable Flemish population. Following the attack by the disgruntled peasants on the abbey its walls and gatehouse were strengthened.

The disputes between the townsfolk and the abbey continued into the late fourteenth and fifteenth centuries. Twelve armed men from the abbey were involved in a fight with townspeople outside of Colkynge's Castle (modern Balkerne Gate) in 1391 over grazing rights to the meadows in the area. The following year in 1392 the Abbot with his supporters got into a fight with his own monks, which spilled over onto St John's Green outside of the Abbey Gate. In 1404 the Abbot, alongside other leading Colcestrians and the Abbot of St Osyth's Priory, were charged with being part of an earlier conspiracy to put the deposed Richard II back on Henry IV's throne. Although the Abbot was acquitted in 1405, the case led to several leading burgesses of Colchester taking legal actions against him, all of which were resolved by 1415. These disputes with the established church stemmed in part from the town's position as a centre of Lollardy. A large group of Lollard books were confiscated in Colchester in 1405 and 1415, and in the late 1420s a group of Norfolk Lollards claimed to have secretly attended meetings in Colchester. In November 1428 a tailor by the name of William Cheveling was burnt at the stake outside of Colkynge's Castle (Balkerne Gate on the Western walls of the town) for being a heretic. The following year, in 1429, during a dispute with the townsfolk over the ownership of the Hythe water mill the Abbot of St John's called the town a nest of Lollards, intending it as an insult. A Colchester man was involved in John Oldcastle's rebellion in 1415 and there were riots in the town in response to the defeat of Jack Cade's rebellion in 1449 and 1450.

Colchester avoided the fighting of the Wars of the Roses which ended the medieval period and ushered in the Tudor period, although Colcestrians were involved in several conspiracies after the conflict ended in the 1470s against Henry VI and Henry VII, both of whom had visited the town (Henry VI in 1445 and Henry VII in 1487 and 1491). Colchester had strong sympathies with the House of York and the Plantagenets, and Richard III had visited the town several times, as a teenager in 1427 and again in 1467/68, staying at the pro-Yorkist St John's Abbey each time. Following the Yorkist defeat at the Battle of Bosworth Field the abbey provided a sanctuary for anti-Lancastrians, including briefly Viscount Lovell. The Abbey's sympathies were remembered in the early Tudor period by Edward IV and Richard III's mother Cecily Neville who left a large sum to the abbey in her will. By the end of the Middle Ages Colchester's population had begun to decline with the shrinking of the medieval cloth trade to about 5,000 by 1520, placing it eleventh in size of English provincial towns.

=== The medieval town ===
==== Borough governance ====
Colchester received its first town charter in 1189 from Richard the Lionheart before he embarked on his crusade, although it is clear from the wording of the document that the rights and privileges granted to the burgesses of Colchester pre-existed their formal recognition in the document. The borough celebrated the 800th anniversary of its charter in 1989. The document set out the election process for the towns bailiffs and justices, and placed the hearings of the Crown Court in the Moot Hall. The charter also defined the qualifications needed to obtain full burgess status; this was that a burgess had to have been born in the town, or had to have served an existing burgess of the town as an apprentice for at least seven years, or had paid for the status with a large fee.

The burgesses' rights included:

- The sole right to all of the fish and shellfish in the River Colne between North Bridge and Westernesse
- The right of access to the Colne River bank
- The right to travel in the borough without tolls, fees or hindrances
- The right to graze the commons between August and February every year
- The right to hunt foxes, hares and cats (polecats)
- They could claim a share of the town's corporate income obtained through fees, licence-payments, tolls, rents and fines
- Permitted to vote on specified matters

This was altered over time; for example Edward II removed the townsfolk's right to disdain from debt accrued in other counties, whilst the modified charter granted in 1413 by Henry V is currently on display in the Castle Museum, and first displayed the coat of arms of Colchester. Henry VI's charter extended the liberty of the borough to include the previously independent vills of Lexden, Greenstead, Mile End and West Donyland. An attempt in 1447 to take the rights to the Colne away from the burgesses and give it to the Earl of Oxford was blocked by the town.

The government of the borough was conducted through a group of officials, whose number, role and electoral procedures altered over the course of the Middle Ages as political, demographic and economic changes affected the town. The officers and aldermen wore red hoods and gowns as a sign of their position. Originally the two highest officials were reeves, later replaced by two bailiffs who were royal officers charged with collecting the fee farm for parliament and holding the borough courts, as well as taking the role of coroners when needed. Their position as royal officers put them at odds with the interest of the burgesses, and in many English towns the role of mayor was created as a counterbalance to their influence; this creation of a mayoral office did not occur in Colchester however, and the two bailiffs continued to act as the borough's chief officers. Elections for the bailiffs took place on 8 September (the Nativity of Mary), and they took office on Michaelmas. By the 13th century the bailiffs and coroners were separated, and the coroners were usually the bailiffs-elect for the following year. Further offices included the town clerk, the farmer of the tolls responsible for collecting the town's due, two to three under-bailiffs to assist the main bailiffs, key keepers to take over from the bailiffs the responsibility of guarding the town's common chest, and from 1310 three (from 1380 four) serjeants to take tolls and keep the peace. The serjeants and town clerk were elected on the 9 September.

With the growth of the town after the Black Death of the mid-14th century the borough government also developed, aided by a growing distrust of the bailiff's powers. In 1372 a new system was brought into effect, with tighter election processes for the bailiffs and two new officials initially called receivers but later chamberlains, responsible for the town's income. The town was divided into four wards: North Ward (the north west quarter of the town), East Ward (the north east), South Ward (south east) and Head Ward (the south west quarter of the town). The leading burgess of each ward chose five other burgesses from his ward to create an overall borough council of 24, from whom the town's officials and board of eight auditors (the aldermen) were chosen. This council and its officials were designed as a counterbalance to the bailiffs, who had previously ruled without referring to a common council of burgesses. The bailiffs and the council's board of aldermen elected 16 men from the four wards to form a second council, which convened four times a year. Further changes occurred in 1447, when a common council was created from four men from each of the four wards, from which the aldermen were to be elected, who in turn would elect four J.P.s to hear Crown Courts, the coroners and the keykeepers.

From 1295 onwards two Members of Parliament represented the town, who were also chosen from amongst the town's leading burgesses, although due to the financial cost involved this was not a popular office to hold. The local Lords were represented in the House of Lords, as was the Abbot of St John's Abbey.

==== Law ====
Jury courts met fortnightly at the Moot Hall, and at three other major hearings on Michaelmas, Hilary and Hock Days, called law hundreds where view of frankpledge was held, and cases concerning the town's treasure trove, the raising of hue and cry, bloodshed, encroachments, overcharging the common, breaches of the assize of ale and of weights and measures, and nuisance were heard. By 1310 the courts met more frequently. Prisoners awaiting trial were kept in a gaol beneath the Moot Hall and outside of the Hall's entrance where the town's stocks were located and where they could be feed by relatives and friends. The town's gallows were located on an unidentified main route outside of the town called Galwystrete (Gallow's Street). Much of the court's time was spent on cases of trespass, illegal hunting, the blocking, diversion and pollution of the town's public water sources, theft, removing stone from the town's walls and pavements, the inconsiderate emptying of pissepotts into the street and the creation of dunghills in public places (mounds of human and animal excrement and rubbish). This later issue was not confined to private residents, as in 1481/82 the chamberlains were charged with creating a dunghill behind the Moot Hall in the Moothalle Yard, and it was reported that "the Master of the schools is in the common habit of casting the dung of his school over and beyond the stone wall of the town at le Posterne and there making a dunghill" for which he was fined. The blocking and pollution of public water sources was always major issue for the courts, and in 1424/25 the town tanners and white-tanners were prosecuted for dumping waste in streams. The town jealously guarded its markets, and closed down an illegal meat market held on Crouch Street in the 15th century. Poaching deer from the Royal forests around the town such as Langham and Kings Wood (modern High Woods to the north of the town) was also a serious issue, and in 1267 when a group of Christian and Jewish Colcestrians chased a deer into the town and killed it the bailiffs confiscated the carcass. Attempts were made to curb gambling with cards, dice and chess in taverns, and to prevent people from staying all night in the taverns or using them during church hours. Practisers of Cleromancy were tightly regulated, whilst two cases of Witchcraft were tried in the town, one in 1420 when the parish clerk of St Peters was supposed to have uttered demonic names whilst practicing black magic, and a second case in 1456 involving a man and wife accused of killing boys in the town with witchcraft. The remains of the executed were placed on public display in the town as a warning, and in 1398 the town received a quarter of Oxfordshire rebel Henry Roper, which was displayed in the town marketplace on the High Street. Thomas Malory, author of the Arthurian romance Le Morte d'Arthur, was imprisoned in Colchester Castle in October 1454 for crimes including horse theft.

==== Other Councils and Courts ====
Aside from the main council and courts in the Moot Hall there were several others in the town. By 1411 a special court to hear cases concerning non-burgesses in the borough liberty called the foreign court was held. In 1477 the town was exempted from the Admiralty court, although it still seems to have been held at the Hythe after this time. The Ecclesiastical institutions also had their own courts. St John's Abbey had its own courts and gallows at its estate in Greenstead. In 1414 the court of the Prior of St Botolph's Priory was indicted for overstepping its authority.

Colchester's medieval Jewish community also had its own council and Beth din. They had their own bailiff by 1220 (the first was Benedict, father of Isaac), and a council chamber granted to them by Henry II in the suburban area of St John's Green, although by 1251 the Abbey of St John had ownership of this and had turned it into a Christian chapel.

==== Religious institutions ====
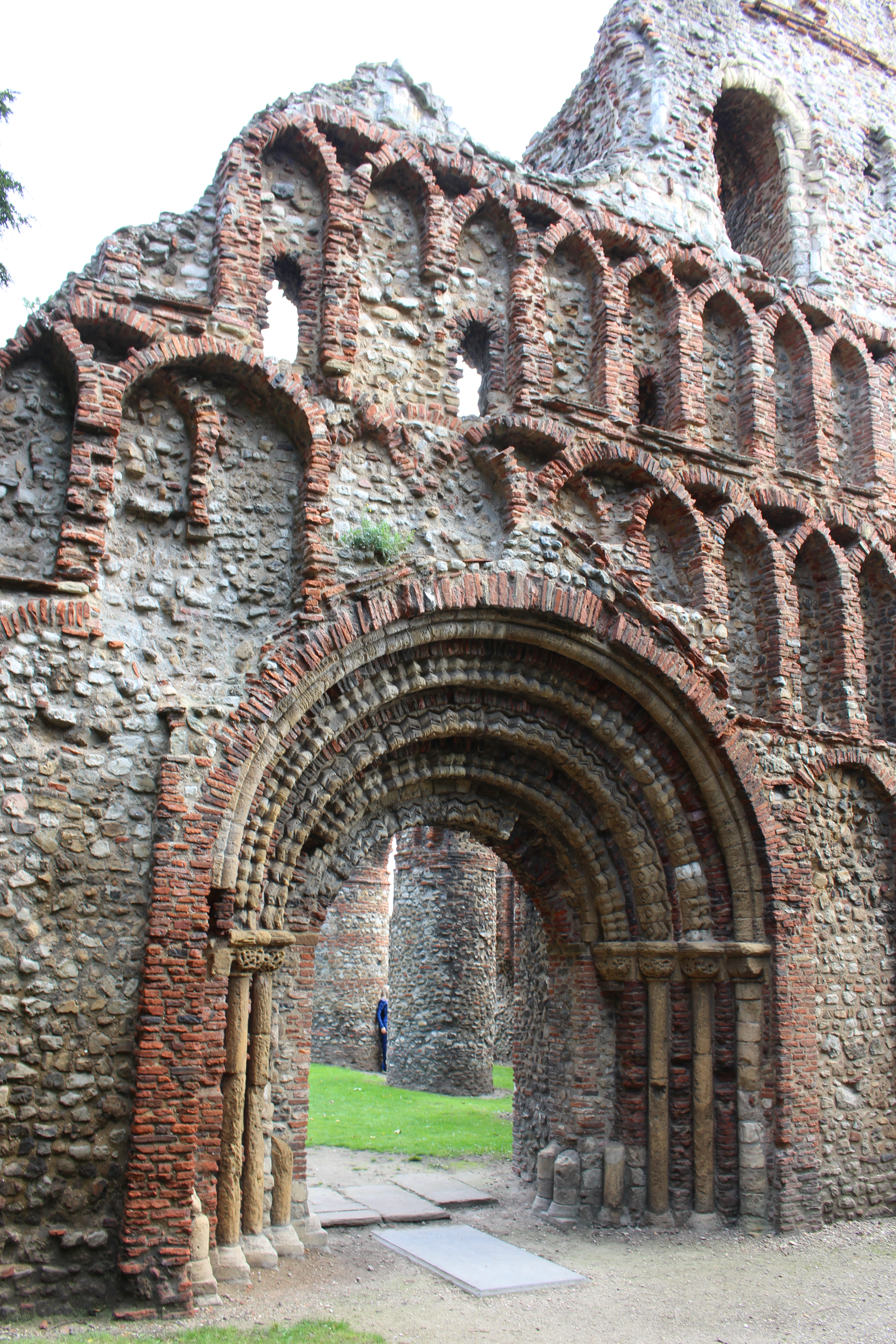
The Pardon Door of St Botolph's Priory

The largest and richest ecclesiastical institution in medieval Colchester was St John's Abbey, a Benedictine monastery founded in 1095 on the site of an existing Saxon church to St John the Baptist or St John the Evangelist to the south of the town. As it was of the Benedictine order, no lay person was permitted to worship in the abbey building itself, and so St Giles church was built by 1172 on the edge of the abbey precinct to serve the lay community of St John's Green. To the north-east of the abbey, on the road out of South Gate, was the Augustinian St Botolph's Priory. A third large institution was the Franciscan Greyfriars, founded by 1237 within the town walls on what is now the west end of East Hill. The Friary, part of the Wardenship of Cambridge, was a large building whose spire was the tallest structure in the medieval town. A fourth monastic institution was the Crossed (also spelt Crouched) Friars on Crouch Street, an Augustinian order separate from those at St Botolph's Priory. They had taken control in 1496 of the Chapel of the Holy Cross, a hospital on the junction of Maldon Road and Crouch Street. A fifth monastic institution, and a second hospital, was St Mary Magdalene's on Magdalene Road on the way to the Hythe port. This was under the nominal control of St John's Abbey, against whom the hospital struggled for independence in the 14th century, including enlisting the aid of Parliament. There were two other medieval hospitals connected to the town, St Catherine's somewhere outside of Head Gate, and St Anne's on Harwich Road, which was the site of a Holy Well. The town had several parish churches; St Mary-at-the-Walls (often called Our Lady-at-the-Walls), St Peter's, St Runwald's, St Martin's, St Nicholas', St James the Great's, All Saints/All Hallows, Holy Trinity, St Leonards-at-the-Hythe, and the chapel of St Helena. The castle contained a chapel, and the town also contained small chantry chapels.

There were numerous religious guilds in the town which were associated with specific churches. The largest of these was the Guild of St Helena, who took their prestige from having the patron saint of Colchester, St Helena, as their own patron. The guild had been given the responsibility in 1407 by Henry IV of taking over the dilapidated Hospital of the Holy Cross, although they were pushed out of this in 1496 by the arrival of the Crossed Friars who spuriously claimed that they had originally owned the hospital.

Other guilds included:

- St Mary's Guild at the church of St Leonards-at-the-Hythe, who maintained an Eternal Light for St Mary in the church
- Jesus Guild at St Peters church from 1447, who maintained the building through money obtained from ownership of Chiswell Meadow outside the south-east walls of the town
- A John the Baptist Guild, also at St Peters
- Corpus Christi Guild at St Nicholas church
- St Anne's Guild, who maintained St Anne's chapel and hospital on Harwich Road
- Saint Mary, St Crispin and St Crispian Guilds at Greyfriars
- St Barbara Guild at All Saints church
- A second St Barbara Guild at St Peters
- St Francis Guild at St James church

Colchester also hosted members of the heretical Christian Lollard sect, who held secret congregations in the town.

Aside from the Christian institutions, the town also had a Jewish rabbi and synagogue in the 13th century. In 1258 a rabbi called Samuel, son of Jechiel is recorded, whilst others are recorded later in the 1260s and 1270s. A synagogue existed in 1268 somewhere on either West or East Stockwell Street, later moving by 1285 to a solar in a house at the west end of the High Street. The medieval Jewish community in Colchester suffered the same fate as those elsewhere in England when they were expelled by King Edward I's Edict of Expulsion in 1290.

==== Economy of medieval Colchester ====
Colchester functioned as the main market town for the villages and townships of North East Essex and South West Suffolk throughout the Middle Ages. The local trade in grain, fish, cattle and sheep, as well as by-products such as beer, bread, wool, cloth, milk, cheese, butter, leather and meat was focused on the town, and were exported to other markets at Ipswich, Great Yarmouth and King's Lynn.

As well as its role as a local market, Colchester was also part of a wider network of trade routes in other goods. Colchester pottery, from kilns such as those excavated by archaeologists at Middleborough, Mile End and along Magdalene Street, has been found across Essex. The kilns also specialised in producing Colchester-ware louvers (ceramic vents or chimney stacks for letting air and smoke out of the roofs of houses and manors), some of which are very elaborate, during the thirteenth to sixteenth centuries which were used across Essex at places like West Bergholt, Heybridge, Chelmsford and Great Easton. Roof and glazed floor tiles were also made at kilns in the town and at nearby Wivenhoe.

However, it was the wool trade from the thirteenth to fifteenth centuries which occupied much of the town's population. By 1247 a fulling mill was recorded in the borough, and the russet woollen and linen cloths produced in the 13th century were sold at fairs in Ipswich and Boston, with Henry III buying Colchester russets to clothe his servants in 1248. However, it was the decades after the Black Death in 1348–49, when Colchester experienced large scale immigration from across Britain and the Low Countries, which saw the greatest boom in the wool trade for the town. Colchester's wool industry benefitted from the fact there was initially no regulatory guild for the weavers and fullers, with wool and dyes from across North East Essex and South West Suffolk, and even from markets at York, Southampton, Lewes and Westminster, coming into the town to be processed. Each bale of cloth could represent the work of up to fifty people from in and around Colchester, including shepherds, wool staplers, carders, wool combers, spinners, dyers, weavers, fullers, roughers, shearers, pressers and merchants. The town was surrounded by watermills used in the fulling process, with Lexden Mill (on the Colne North of Lexden), North Mill (to the west of North Bridge), New Mill (somewhere near North Bridge), Middle Mill (the main mill of the town), Stokes Mill (between Middle Mill and East Mill), East Mill (at East Bridge), Hythe Mill, Mill-in-the-Woods (possibly the same structure as Hythe Mill), Canwick Mill, Bourne Mill (the last two were on the Bourne Brook south of the walled town) and Hull Mill being especially close to the town.

At its peak, Colchester was exporting 40,000 bales of cloth annually, specialising in grey-brown russet cloth. The quality of Colchester's russets made it a favourite amongst England's clergy. By 1373 there were two wool fairs in the town, and wool was exported via Colchester's Hythe port to Zeeland, Flanders, Calais, Saint-Omer, Amiens, the Mediterranean, Sweden, Prussia, Gascony, Spain, and later in the 15th century to the German Hanseatic League, especially Cologne. Colchester's main trade partner outside England was Bruges, to which cloth, wool and dyes (as well as grain, butter and cheese) were exported in exchange for more exotic products such as wine, spices, saffron, nuts, furs, salt, soap, bitumen, ginger, garlic, pepper and silk. Customs officials from London and Ipswich would cocket the sacks of wool and cloth, whilst seven local officials aided the King's serjeant-at-arms in searching ships for uncustomed woollen products. The wool trade in the town began to change in the 15th century, with the creation in 1407 of two Masters of the Weaver's Art, and in 1411–12 the creation by the town bailiffs of new laws to protect and regulate the cloth industry. These included the standardisation of weights, a requirement that all spinning was to be carried out within the borough, that weavers were not to be paid with food or merchandise instead of coin, that a person could not be a weaver and a fuller, no apprentice was to serve less than five years, and that all disputes were to be solved by the two Masters. A separate fullers guild was also permitted by the town bailiffs, with two Masters to be elected annually on the Monday after Michaelmas at St Cross Church and to swear oaths of office before the presence of the bailiffs. However, by the second half of the 15th century war and depopulation in the Baltic states and France had caused a severe decline in trade with those regions, resulting in a large contraction of the wool trade in Colchester despite the continued presence of Hanseatic merchants in the town. Despite the shrinking of the medieval wool trade, the cloth industry in Colchester would boom again to even greater heights during the second half of the 16th century and into the 17th century.

Other industries were also present in the town. During the 14th century the leather working industry employed almost as many people as the cloth industry did, although this too declined in the later 14th century. In 1311 there was the creation of butchers wardens in response to complaints about the quality of the meat market, in 1336 there were two Keepers of the Tanners Art (although they were not formally recognised until 1442), in 1425 there was the creation of the four Masters of the Cordwainers Art, in 1451 the wax chandlers had Masters, and in 1456–57 there was the creation of four Supervisors of the Curriers Craft. The fish and oyster industry was also an important component of the medieval town's economy, with Colchester fish being sold at Sudbury, Dunwich and Great Yarmouth. In 1365 officials were created to supervise the fish market in the town, whilst illegal fishing and oyster cultivation was targeted by the bailiffs in an edict from 1382, which prohibited the forestalling of fish by blocking the river, the dredging of oysters out of season and the obstructing of the river. Colchester artisans included clockmakers, who maintained clocks in church towers across north Essex and Suffolk. Several were of French ancestry, such as John Orlogeer, who was admitted as a burgess in 1357–58 and William Orlogeer, admitted in 1368–69, whose surnames come from horloger (French for clockmaker), or Flemish ancestry, such as Austyn Wegayn (whose surname is an English rendition of the Flemish surname Begeyn). Colchester clockmakers repaired the two clocks in Colchester, at St John's Abbey and St Leonards-at-the-Hythe, Lord Howard's clock in 1482, the clock at Ramsey, and at Saffron Walden in 1461. Some of the richer members of Colchester's Jewish population were involved in moneylending, which was forbidden to Christians. This made them a scapegoat in hard times causing them to favour living in sturdy stone-built houses, such as the two owned by a man called "Aaron the Jew" in the 12th century. However, most of the Jewish community in Colchester were poor in comparison to others around Essex and East Anglia.

==== Layout of the medieval town ====
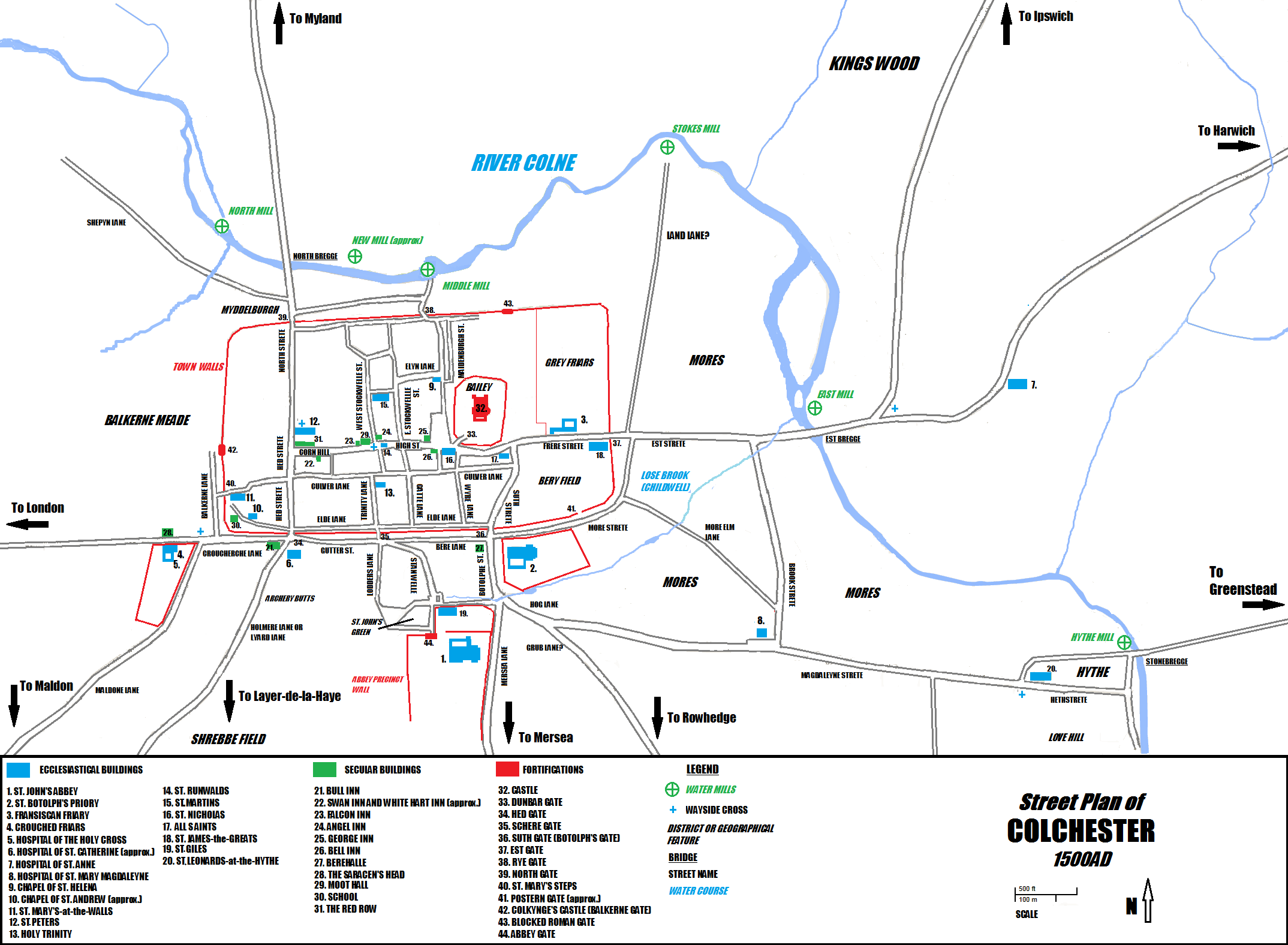
Colchester in 1500

Medieval Colchester had developed from the Saxon town, which in turn had grown within the shell of the old Roman town of Camulodunum. Most of the town was located within the old Roman walls, although suburbs along the main routes out of the town developed during the Middle Ages.

===== Intramural features =====
Most of the medieval town was located within the town walls, which were originally the walls of the Roman town. The walls were further strengthened in the Middle Ages by the addition of bastion towers around the southern portion of the walls, which took place in either 1312 or during an extensive repair of the walls in 1382–1421. To the ire of the town officials, the walls were sometimes the target of illegal quarrying of building stone by the townspeople. Of the original six Roman gates, two (Balkerne Gate and Duncan's Gate) had been blocked up, probably in the 4th century. This left Hed Gate (modern Head Gate) as the main entrance to the town (hence its name), with North Gate, Suth Gate (modern South Gate) and Est Gate (modern East Gate) as the remaining Roman gateways. In addition, four new gates were cut through the town walls during the Middle Ages. These are Ryegate (meaning River Gate, sometimes called Northsherd, the modern Ryegate Street), le Posterne (modern St Marys Steps next to the Arts Centre), Scheregate (modern Scheregate Steps) and a small Postern gate somewhere in the south-east corner of the town walls. The gates were frequently in a state of disrepair.

Through Hed Gate was Hed Strete (modern Head Street), which followed the old north–south Cardo maximus of the Roman town, continuing on as North Strete (modern North Hill) out of the North Gate. Two small lanes (the modern Church Street and Church Walk) led west from Hed Strete to St Mary-at-the-Walls church, a small chapel to St Andrew and Colchester's medieval school house. Next to St Marys was le Posterne, which was made by widening an existing Roman drain in the walls to create a foot passageway out of the town onto Balkerne Lane. At the south end of North Strete sat St Peters church, whose churchyard contained a large stone cross and a large stone marker of some kind.

Running east from Hed Strete was the other main street in the town, High Strete (modern High Street), which roughly followed the old Decumanus Maximus of the Roman town. The west end of High Strete, where the junction with Hed Strete is, was called Corn Hill because it was where the Corn Market was based at the Red Row, and also contained a bear-baiting stake. The High Strete was the location of Colchester's market, with the grain market at Corn Hill, les Butterstalls (the butter market) opposite the Moot Hall, the fish market on the south side of the street (which also sold porpoises), the shambles (meat market) around and to the east St Runwalds church (which stood in the centre of the street), the Cook Shop Row close to this, the vegetable market at the east end of the street near St Nicholas church, and several other groups of shops and stalls called la Bacherie and Cordwainers Row. A building for market officials called the Thulohus (toll house) stood in the High Strete. The market was originally only on Wednesdays and Saturdays, but by 1285 it was held on nearly every day of the week. The Moot Hall itself was a Saxon stone building with elaborate carved windows and doors, which was given new marble steps and a new entranceway in 1373/74. As well as housing a goal for those awaiting trial in its courts, the Moot Hall also contained a white-washed strong room in its cellar to hold valuables for the market holders. Next to the Moot Hall, on its west side, stood the Falcon Inn (later the Queens Head, and then the Three Cups Hotel) which was an important building in the town. In its later history it would host Admiral Nelson and the future French King Louis XVIII during their visits to the town. Other Inns on the High Strete included the George (which still stands as a hotel and public house under the same name), and the Angel (at junction of High Strete and West Stockwell Strete, also called Angel Lane after the Inn). The Bell Inn stood to the west of St Nicholas church, and housed part of the vegetable market. The Swan Inn and Hart Inn stood somewhere on the west end of the High Strete, near Helle Lane (possibly the modern Bank Passage between High Street and Culver Street West). The churches of St Nicholas and All Saints still stand on the south side of the High Strete at its eastern end, whilst the church of St Runwalds, which stood in the middle of the market, was demolished in the 19th century. One of the two bells in St Nicholas church was cast by Joanna Hille in 1411, the first recorded example of a woman casting a church bell.

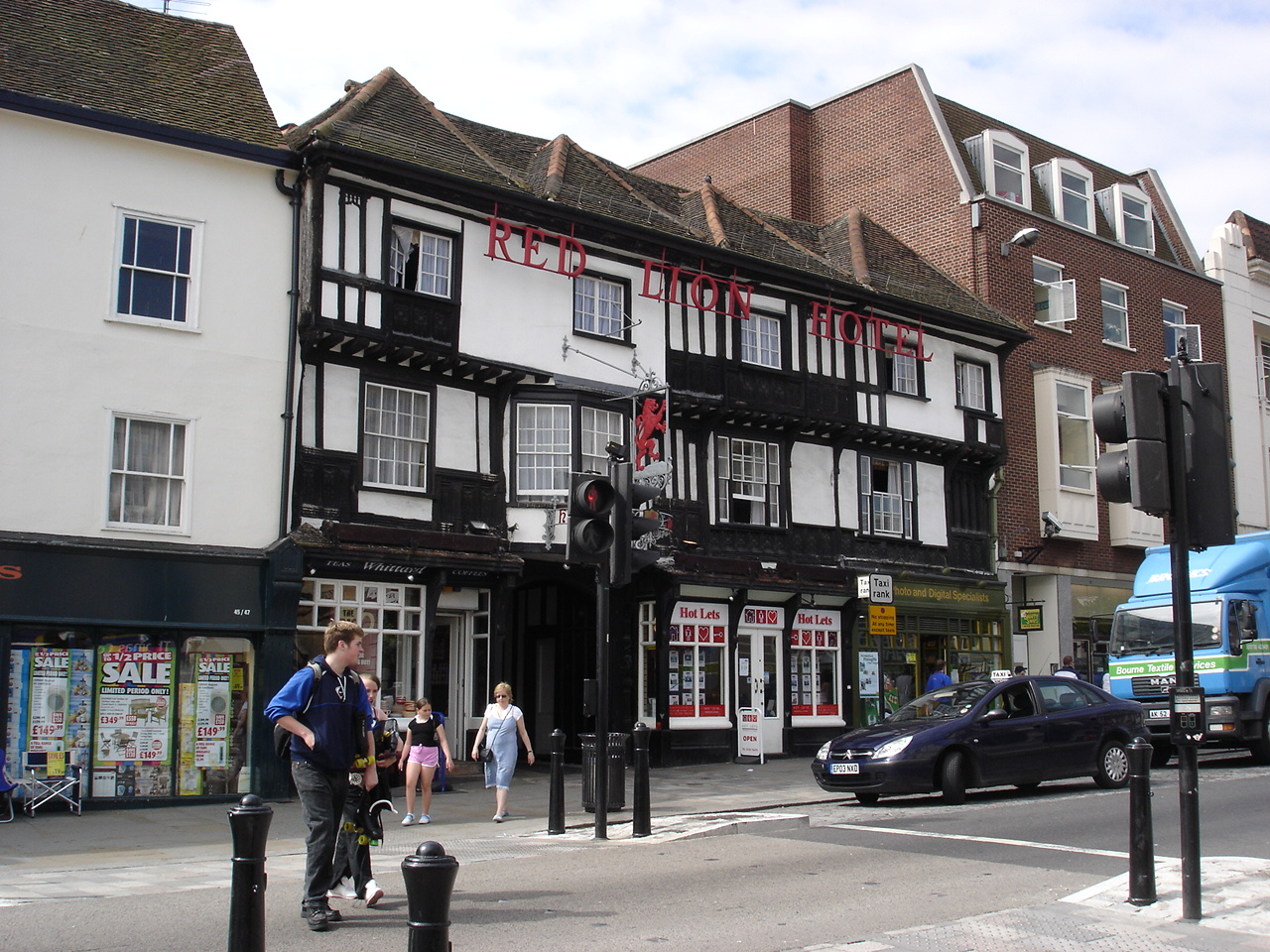
The Red Lion, built by John Howard in the late 15th century

The High Strete continued east to Est Gate (modern East Gate) as Frere Strete (modern East Hill), so called because the Franciscan Greyfriars stood on its north side, opposite the church of St James-the-Greats on the south side of the street. Where High Strete became Frere Strete there was another main road running south, called Suth Strete (modern Queen Street) which led out of Suth Gate (South Gate). Running east-west between Suth Strete and Hed Strete, and parallel to the High Strete ran Culver Strete (modern Culver Street East and Culver Street West) and Elde Lane (modern Short Wyre Street, Eld Lane and Sir Isaacs Walk). Elde Lane was the location of several alms houses for the poor from 1481/2 onwards. Connecting Elde Lane, Culver Strete and High Strete were three north–south streets, Catte Lane (modern Lion Walk), Wyre Lane (modern Long Wyre Street) and Trinity Lane (modern Trinity Street) where Holy Trinity church stands. The junction of Catte Lane and High Strete is where John Howard built his house that would later become the Red Lion.

To the north of High Strete ran three north–south streets, West Stockwell Strete, Est Stockwell Strete and Maidenburgh Strete (the modern West and East Stockwell Streets and Maidenburgh Street respectively). These streets were Saxon in origin, leading down to the old Stockwell public well. St Martins church stood on West Stockwell Strete, which was also home to Colchester's cobblers, whilst St Helena's Chapel stood on Maidenburgh Strete, on the corner of Elyn Lane (modern St Helens Lane). The south end of Maidenburgh Strete, where it joins High Strete, was an open market space taking up the area between modern Madienburgh Street, George Street and the east end of Williams Walk. These streets headed north down to what is now Northgate Street, where the Ryegate gave access to Middle Mill. The Castle sat with its associated buildings in the castle Bailey, surrounded by the bank and ditch defences, on the north side of the High Strete. The castle was the County Jail for most of the Middle Ages, with most dignitaries choosing to stay at St John's Abbey from the 14th century onwards.

The houses and buildings along the street fronts were timber framed, and usually consisted of a main hall and several side rooms, with ovens, wells and yards. Locally made roof tile, louvers and Flemish-style glazed floor tiles were in many of the larger houses. Behind the street fronts were large yards and cultivation plots, as well as industrial features such as metal casting pits and lime kilns. A feature of the medieval town were burgates, enclosed urban estates attached to some of the larger dwellings. As well as around 13 inns, the town also contained around 15–20 taverns. this cross roads was located the Bull Inn, which is still in existence as Colchester's oldest public house, and St Catherine's Hospital. The road to London was Croucherche Strete (modern Crouch Street), named after the Crouched Friars priory and Hospital of St Cross on the south-west corner of the junction with Maldone Lane (modern Maldon Road). Opposite the priory was an Inn called the Saracen's Head and an elaborate wayside cross. Croucherche Strete continued eastwards as Gutter Strete (modern St John's Street) where it met a cross-roads outside of Scheregate. Scheregate gave more direct access to the town for St John's Abbey and St John's Green via Lodders Lane (modern Abbey Gate Street) and Stanwell Strete (modern Stanwell Street). The abbey precinct, surrounded on the east, north and west sides by a wall which enclosed St Giles church, the abbey building itself and several smaller buildings, including the Abbot's house. Gutter Strete continued east to the cross-roads outside of Suth Gate as Bere Lane (modern Vineyard Street), which was one of the poorest districts in the town. Bere Lane took its name from the Berehalle (Bear Hall, a bear and bull baiting arena) located on its southern side. The road was also home to medieval Colchester's licensed brothels and stew houses (bath house/brothel buildings), and medieval tennis courts. The area kept its reputation as the Red-light district of Colchester until the end of the Victorian era, when the houses along what is now Vineyard carpark were demolished in a slum clearance, and the roads name was changed to the more innocuous sounding Vineyard Street. Bere Lane met Botolph Strete (modern St Botolph's Street) outside of the Suth Gate, which became the main road south out of the town to Mersea Island. St Botolph's Priory stood in its precinct behind the street front on the east side of the road, whilst the east precinct wall of St John's Abbey lay against its west side.

Along Botolph Strete's east side lay Hog Lane (also Grub Strete), which ran east to become Magdaleyne Strete (modern Magdalene Street and Barrack Street), the main road to the Hythe port, and another branch road to Rowhedge (modern Military Road). Magdaleyne Strete was named after the Hospital of St Mary Magdaleyne, which stood on the junction between Magdaleyne Strete and Brook Strete (modern Brook Street). This latter street took its name from the Lose Brook in the valley between Magdaleyne Strete and the town walls, a stream which arose at the Stanwell (Stone Well) on St John's Green before travelling east through the precinct of St Botolph's Priory and then across the mores (uncultivated land) to the south east of the town before emptying into the Colne near Est Bregge (East Bridge). This brook was used by the medieval cloth workers who lived at St John's Green and along Botolph Strete. Running around the outside of the south-east corner of the town was More Strete (modern Priory Street), named after the mores around it. A small lane ran across these mores from More Strete to Brook Strete called More Elm Lane, named after the Elm Trees that lined it.

More Strete connected Botolph Strete with Est Strete (modern East Street), which exited the town at Est Gate before crossing the Colne at Est Brugge (East Bridge). The community along Est Strete was one of the poorest in the town after Bere Lane, and was home to several unlicensed brothels. There was a mill at Est Brugge and small jetties on the river bank. Across the Est Brugge there stood a stone wayside cross at the point where the Est Strete divided into the main roads to Ipswich and Harwich (modern Ipswich and Harwich Roads respectively). Outside of North Gate ran the main road to Myland (Mile End) and Sudbury, with the suburbs of Myddelburgh (Middleborough) located on this road between North Gate and Northbregge (North Bridge). Myddelburgh and Myland contained pottery and louver kilns.

===== The medieval Hythe port =====
Magdaleyne Strete led from Colchester and connected the town to the Hythe, and by the 14th century houses extended from the Hythe all the way up to St Mary Magdalene hospital. The road into the Hythe was called Hethstrete (modern Hythe Hill), and had a wayside cross at some point along it. Although physically separate from the main part of the town proper, the Hythe was legally part of the town. The Hythe had a foot bridge in place of the old ford by 1407 to reach the east bank of the Colne, which in 1473–74 was replaced by the Stonebregge (Stone Bridge) to give access to the village of Greenstead. However, all of the structures at the Hythe were located on its west bank, which included cranes (some of the earliest recorded in England), warehouses, boat building sheds, at least one mill and brew houses (which used the raw water from the Colne for brewing). The river between the Hythe and Wivenhoe had been straightened in the early 14th century, but most large ships could not fit along the river to the Hythe, and so instead alighted their cargo at Brightlingsea close to the Colne Estuary, from where it was taken to the Hythe in smaller boats. Owing to this role as Colchester's surrogate port Brightlingsea subsequently became a member of the medieval Cinque Ports alliance. The Hythe was the richest parish in the town due to its port and river trade, and had its own small market for fish and bread. The Hythe saw a slight increase in trade through the second half of the 14th century, which has been linked to a decline in Ipswich's port from the 1330s into the 15th century. However, by the late 15th century the amount of revenue taken as river toll was down due to a contraction in overseas trade, and most shipping was done through London.

== Early modern era ==
=== Dutch community ===
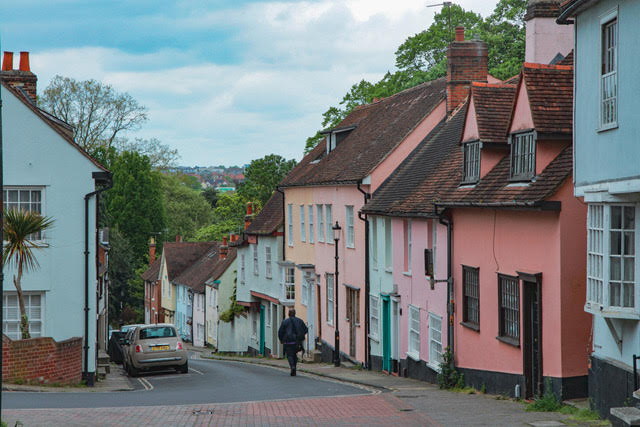
The Dutch Quarter photographed in 2024

The 1560s saw the beginning of a sustained period of immigration to Colchester, consisting primarily of Protestant Dutch weavers and clothmakers fleeing religious persecution in Flanders. The Dutch community in Colchester grew from 55 people in 1565 to 1,291 in 1586; thereafter the population stabilised at around 1,500 throughout the 17th century. The Dutch community brought with them much expertise in the textile trade, and were soon granted several privileges, including the right to inspect new draperies; as a result, Colchester bays enjoyed a high reputation throughout Europe into the early 18th century. They also received the right to their own church.

The turn of the 18th century saw the Dutch corporation exert increasing control over the cloth industry, introducing bylaws which stinted produced, and limiting entry to the corporation. At the same time, the War of the Spanish Succession saw a sharp decline in demand for Colchester cloth in Spain, formerly a key market. A riot broke out in 1715, leading to many of the bylaws being overturned; this began a period of decline for the Dutch corporation, which was dissolved in 1728. Meanwhile the Dutch community itself was becoming increasingly less prominent through ongoing integration with the Colcestrian population; 1728 also saw the closure of the Dutch church in the town.

An area in Colchester town centre is still known as the Dutch Quarter, and many buildings there date from the Tudor period. Between 1796 and 1810 Jane Taylor lived in West Stockwell Street of the Dutch Quarter, famous for writing the poem Twinkle Twinkle Little Star.

=== Witch trials ===
Colchester played a prominent role in the witch hunts of the 16th and 17th centuries. The self-proclaimed Witchfinder General, Matthew Hopkins, used Colchester Castle as his base.

=== English Civil War ===
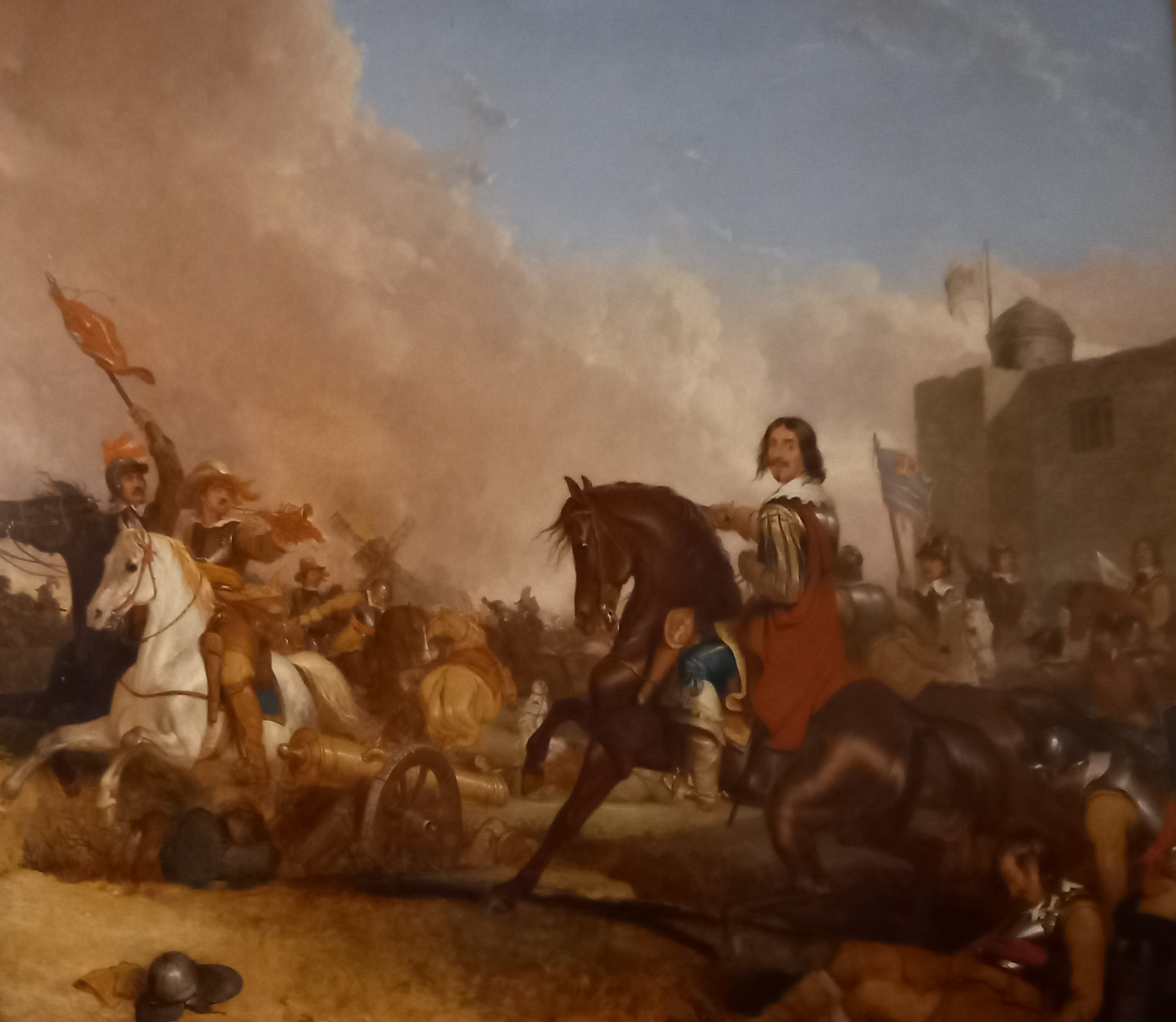
A painting depicting Lord Cappell in action at the Siege of Colchester in 1648. The tower of Colchester Castle can be seen in the background.

The outbreak of the First English Civil War, Colchester supported the Parliamentarian cause. Throughout the conflict Colchester contributed money, horses, and men to the Parliamentarian cause, including to the army of Robert Devereux, 3rd Earl of Essex. The first major instance of violence broke out when it became known that Sir Charles Lucas was stockpiling weapons for the Royalists; a crowd stormed St John's Abbey, seized the weapons, and imprisoned Lucas and his family. Their release was negotiated by Sir Thomas Barrington and Sir Harbottle Grimston.

In 1648, Colchester was thrown into the thick of the Second English Civil War when a large Royalist army (led by Sir Charles Lucas and Sir George Lisle) entered the town. They were hotly pursued from Kent by a detachment of the New Model Army led by Sir Thomas Fairfax, Henry Ireton, and Thomas Rainsborough. The Roundheads besieged the town for 76 days. By that time, many of the town's most ancient monuments like St. Mary's Church and the Gate of St. John's Abbey were partially destroyed and the inhabitants were reduced to eating candles and boots. When the Royalists surrendered in the late summer, Lucas and Lisle were shot in the grounds of Colchester Castle. The spot is marked by an obelisk today and there is a myth that no grass will grow in this area (it has since been covered with tarmac to make sure.)

=== Plague ===
Daniel Defoe mentions in A tour through England and Wales that the town lost 5,259 people to the plague in 1665, "more in proportion than any of its neighbours, or than the city of London". By the time he wrote this in 1722, however, he estimated its population (including "out-villages") to have risen to around 40,000.

== Modern era ==
=== Railways ===
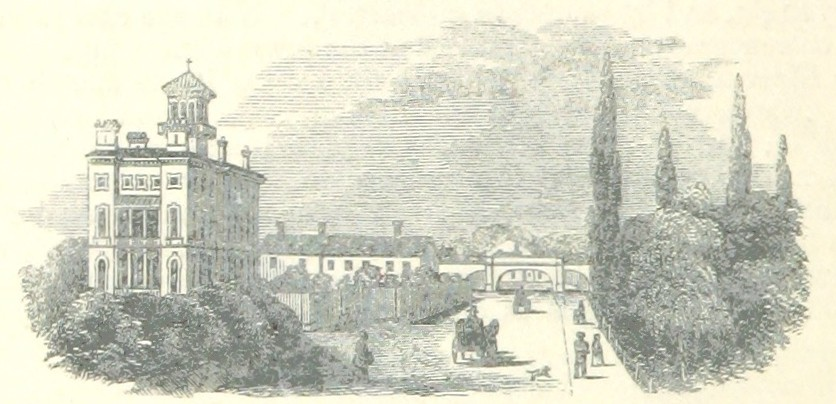
An illustration of Colchester railway station in 1851

The railways first came to Colchester in 1843, with the Eastern Counties Railway extending the London to Chelmsford line north to Colchester; arriving at what is now Colchester railway station. In 1846, the Eastern Union Railway built a line connecting Colchester to Ipswich, and by 1849 this line had been extended as far north as Norwich.

The 'Railway Mania' of the 1840s and 50s also saw the opening of branch lines to the Hythe (1847), Hadleigh (1847), Sudbury (1849), and Harwich (1854). The Hythe line was expanded over the following period, reaching Wivenhoe in 1863, Weeley and Brightlingsea in 1866, and Walton in 1867. Furthermore, it was extended to central Colchester in 1866, with the opening of St Botoloph's railway station.

In 1991, St Botoloph's station was renamed Colchester Town station. When Colchester received city status in 2022, there were calls for the station to be renamed to reflect this; however, Greater Anglia announced in 2023 that they have no plans to do so, owing to the cost associated.

=== Sports teams ===
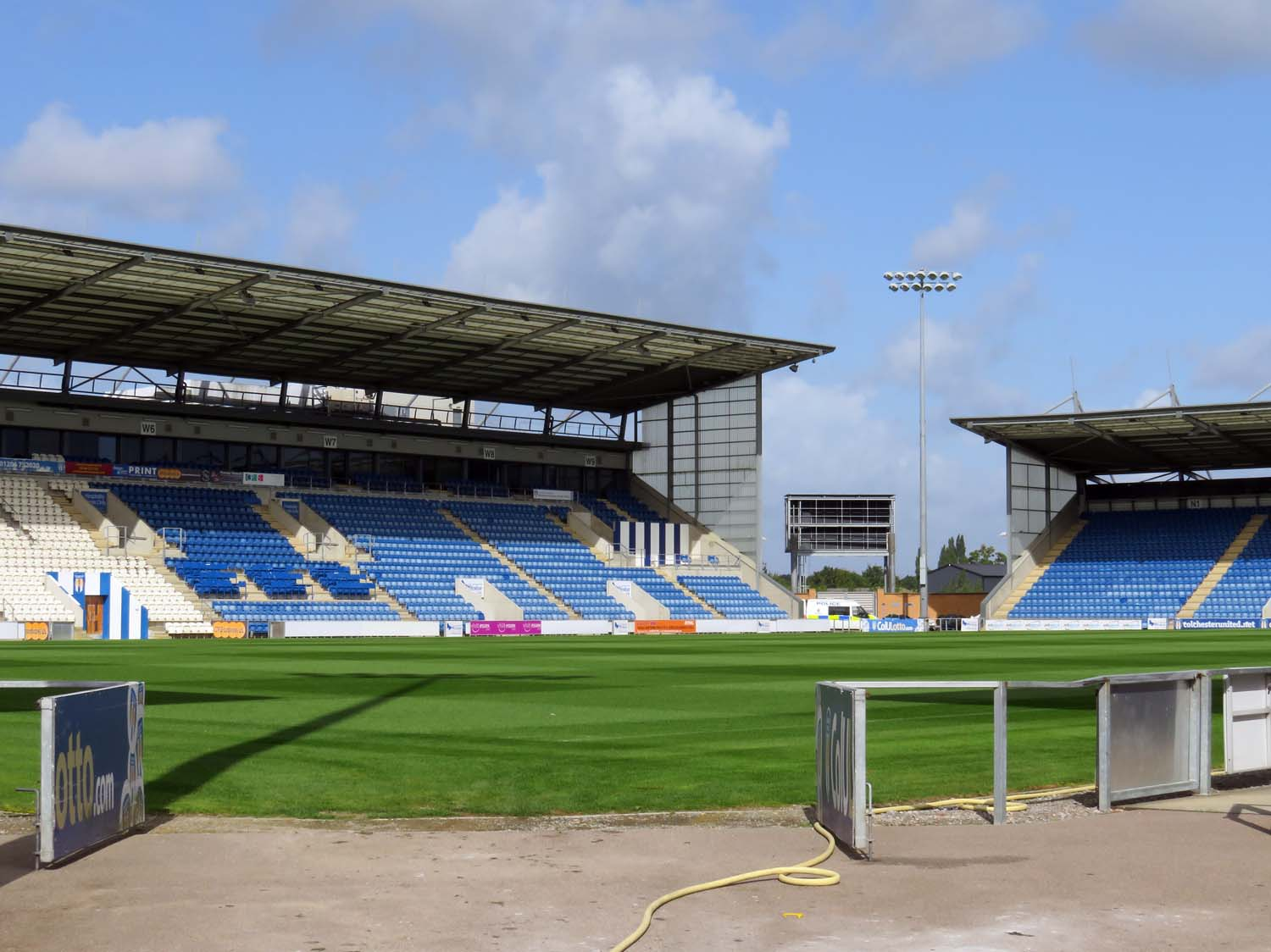
Colchester Community Stadium, photographed in 2017

The town's first amateur association football club, Colchester Town F.C., was founded in 1873. In 1937 the first professional club, Colchester United F.C., was formed, with Colchester Town becoming the reserve club. For most of its history, Colchester United played at Layer Road. In 2008 they moved to newly built Colchester Community Stadium.

Colchester and Essex Cricket Club formed in c. 1861, and in 1908 moved to Castle Park Cricket Ground, where they play to this day, now as Colchester and East Essex Cricket Club. The ground has also been used by Essex County Cricket Club in the past, including hosting their first game in 1914, and as a regular out-ground until 2017.

Colchester RFC, the city's rugby club, was formed in 1925.

Since 1983, Colchester has had an American football team, the Colchester Gladiators.

=== Colchester earthquake ===
At around 9:20 in the morning of 22 April 1884 the Colchester area was at the epicentre of the UK's most destructive earthquake, estimated to have been 5.2 on the Richter Scale, and lasting for about 20 seconds. The quake was felt over much of southern England and into Europe, and over 1,200 buildings were destroyed or damaged.

The Times for Wednesday 23 April reported damage "in the many villages in the neighbourhood from Colchester to the sea coast", with many poor people made homeless, and estimated the financial cost of the quake at 10,000 pounds sterling. Great damage was also reported in Wivenhoe and Ipswich, and buildings destroyed included Langenhoe church. The death of a child at Rowhedge was also reported.

A copy of the Report on the East Anglian Earthquake of April 22, 1884 can be found in the Colchester local library.

=== Business and manufacturing ===
==== Colchester Co-op ====
The Colchester and East Essex Co-operative Society was founded in 1861. Today the society is the largest independent retail chain in the region with a net asset value of £65 million.

==== Paxman ====
Engine manufacturer Paxman has been associated with Colchester since 1865 when James Noah Paxman founded a partnership with the brothers Henry and Charles Davey ('Davey, Paxman, and Davey') and opened the Standard Ironworks at a location in the town centre. In 1876 James Paxman obtained a site on Hythe Hill and the company moved to the "New" Standard Ironworks.

In 1925 Paxman produced its first spring injection oil engine and joined the English Electric Diesel Group in 1966 – later becoming part of GEC. Since the 1930s the Paxman company's main business has been the production of diesel engines. Paxman engines are world-famous. They are used in fast naval patrol craft, submarines, and high-speed trains. At its peak, the Paxman works covered 23 acres (93,000 m^{2}) and employed over 2,000 people.

Paxman became part of MAN Diesel in 2000. In 2003 the company announced proposals to transfer manufacturing to Stockport. Production was wound down, and what was to be the last production engine to be built in Colchester was completed on 15 September 2003. However, the Stockport plant proved unable to manufacture the popular VP185 efficiently, and thus in 2005, production resumed in Colchester.

== Commemoration ==
=== Oyster Feast ===
The Oyster Feast is the centrepiece of the Colchester's annual civic calendar. The feast celebrates the "Colchester Natives" (the native oyster, Ostrea edulis) that are gathered from the Colne oyster fishery. The feast has its origins in the 14th century and is held in the Moot Hall.

=== Colchester Town Watch ===
Colchester Town Watch was founded in 2001 to provide a ceremonial guard for the mayor of Colchester and for the town for civic events.

A self-financed body of volunteers, the Watch is convened under the auspices of the Statutes of Winchester of 1253. This statute was introduced to provide for some sort of law and order, and created the first police force in the UK. Today's Watch, of course, are a purely ceremonial body, leaving law and order to the Essex Constabulary.

The Watch's livery is based on late Elizabethan dress, and is in the town colours of red and green. The Watch wear crested morions, back and breastplates, and carry either partizans or half-pikes when on duty. The Captain has the privilege of wearing Elizabethan "civvies".

A fine and colourful (in every sense) body of persons, the Watch provide a link with Colchester history at many civic events. Their day is, however, the Marching Watches. On the Saturday closest to the Vigil of St. John The Baptist, the watch "walk the walls" completing a circuit of Colchester's town wall (the oldest in Britain, with parts dating back to Roman times), a "beating the bounds" type ceremony, establishing the territory they protect. A distance of some 3 kilometers, it finishes in a local hostelry, The Foresters Arms, so that the Watch may refresh themselves. They are accompanied by Mayors past and present, such civic dignitaries as may wish to attend, and anyone else who cares to join in.

== Colchester Army Garrison ==
The first permanent military garrison in Colchester was established by the Legio XX Valeria Victrix in AD 43 following the Claudian invasion of Britain.

The first formal barracks were built in Colchester in 1794, and expanded throughout the Napoleonic Wars. By 1805, Colchester could accommodate more than 7,000 soldiers and 400 horses; at a time when the town's population was around 11,500. Following the end of the Napoleonic Wars, the barracks were greatly reduced in scale, until by 1821 there were just 618 soldiers based in the town.

The second half of the 19th century saw the barracks expanded once more, with the construction of wooden huts for up to 5,000 men in 1855–56, a firing range at Middlewick in 1857, a cavalry barracks for 2,500 men in 1862–64, and an artillery barracks in the early 1870s. This continued into the 20th century, with the construction of Goojerat, Sabraon, Hyderabad, and Meaner barracks from 1900–1904. During the First World War, several battalions of Kitchener's Army were trained in Colchester. In 1914 the town housed up to 40,000 trainees. The barracks continued to expand in the interwar period, including the establishment of an airfield.

The postwar period saw the barracks concentrated down to a smaller size. Today, there are considerable plans to build a new and modern barracks out of the town to free up building land in the centre and replace the Victorian buildings. There are hopes that some of the original architecture will be conserved for heritage, and in 2004, the Garrison Conservation Area was designated.
