= Bourne Mill, Colchester =

National Trust property in Essex

Bourne Mill
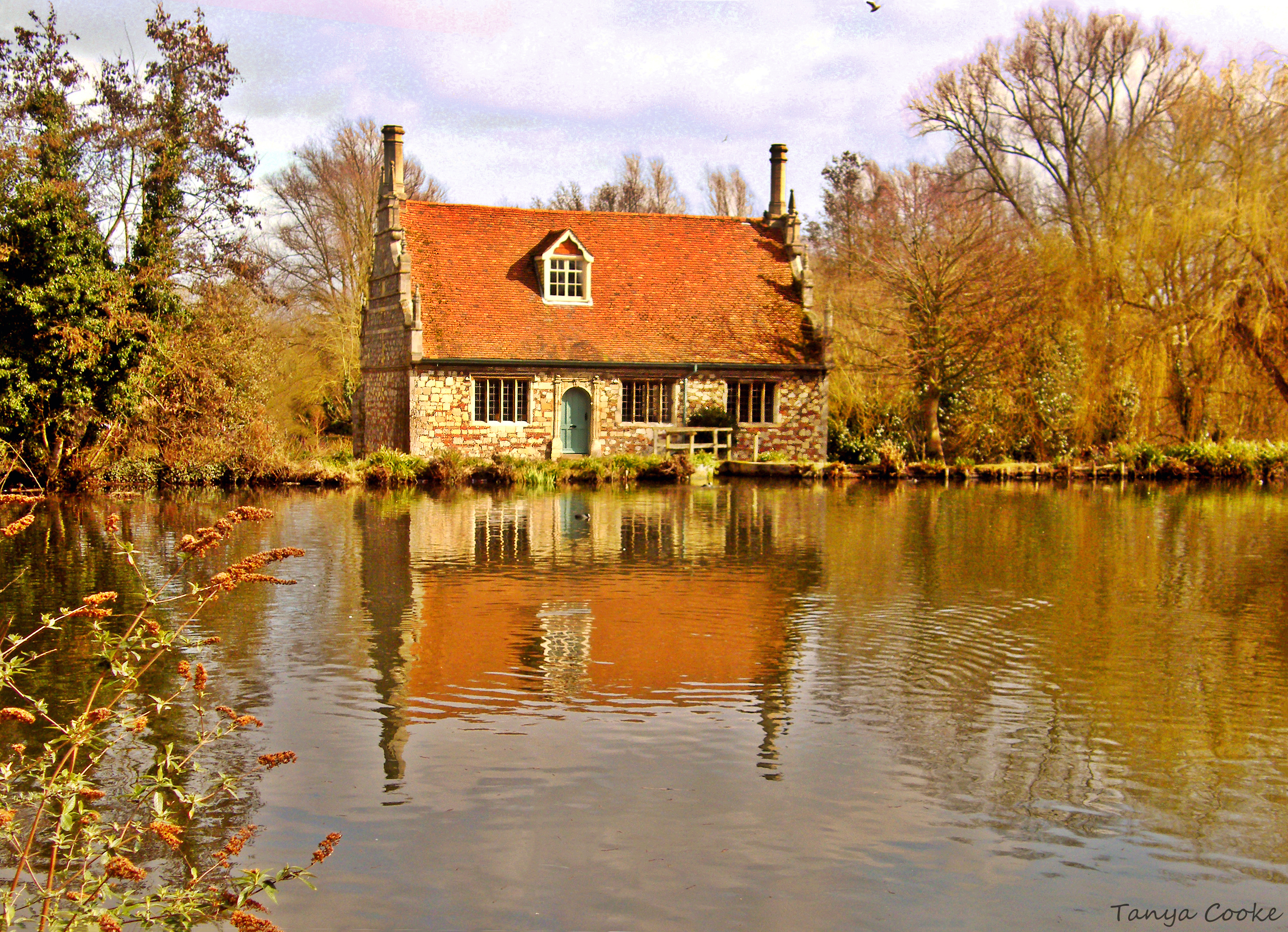
- Bourne Mill and Bourne Pond

- Location within Essex
- 51°52′38″N 0°54′45″E
- Type: Watermill
- Location: Colchester
- OS grid reference: TM 00565 23846

History
- Built: 1591
- Rebuilt: 1640

Site notes
- Area: Essex
- Owner: National Trust

Listed Building – Grade I
- Official name: Bourne Mill
- Designated: 24 February 1950
- Reference no.: 1123673

Bourne Mill is a Grade I listed former fishing lodge and then in turn a fulling mill and cornmill in the city of Colchester in Essex and is owned by the National Trust.

== Bourne Mill, as a mill belonging to St John's Abbey ==
St John's Abbey was founded as a priory in 1096 and granted abbey status in 1104. By 1311 Bourne Mill belonged to St John's Abbey, and may have been the Abbey's mill from the time of its foundation. Its name is first recorded in c. 1240 and derives from the small stream, or bourne, south of Colchester which drove the mill. It was a corn mill throughout the Middle Ages, and was possibly rebuilt in c. 1326. Its pond was the Abbey's fishpond.

== Sir Thomas Lucas's fishing lodge ==
At the dissolution of the Abbey in 1539, the mill and pond passed through a number of hands before being sold to John Lucas. John Lucas built a mansion on the site of the Abbey (subsequently destroyed during the Civil War). His son, Thomas, built a fishing lodge in 1591, incorporating elements of the former Abbey and his arms above the doorway. The gable ends are in the Dutch style, and incorporate a chimney at each end.

== Conversion to a mill ==
In 1640 the fishing lodge was fitted out as a fulling mill and run by Flemish refugees. In about 1840 it then became a cornmill and remained as such until the 1930s. The conversion to a cornmill resulted in the insertion of an upper floor and a sack hoist.

== Acquisition by the National Trust ==
The descendants of John Lucas continued to hold it until 1917. It was acquired by the National Trust in 1936 from the last miller, Alfred Pulford, after its shaft broke. The early history of the Trust's ownership of the mill was unsatisfactory, and by 1950 it had become derelict. At that point it was Grade I listed. It was converted into a house; the machinery was restored in 1966.
