= Catherine Horwood =

English journalist, author and social historian

- Born: Catherine Horwood
- Occupations: Author; Journalist; Biographer
- Spouse: Patrick Barwise
- Writing career
- Genres: Horticulture; History; Fashion
- Website: catherinehorwood.com

Catherine Horwood is an English journalist, author and social historian who writes on horticulture, garden design, and in fashion, the history of dress. She is the authorised biographer of the British plantswoman, garden designer, and author, Beth Chatto (creator of Beth Chatto Gardens near Elmstead, Essex). Her biography, Beth Chatto: a life with plants won the European Garden Book of the Year award in 2020.

Horwood has contributed to the Oxford Dictionary of National Biography and to BBC Radio 4 programmes on social history.

She is married to emeritus Professor Patrick Barwise.

== Journalism ==
Horwood has written for English Garden, Gardens Illustrated and Good Housekeeping magazine, becoming Good Housekeeping's features editor.

== Academic career ==
Horwood completed a Master of Arts (MA) degree in Women's History, and a PhD on Interwar Middle Class dress codes at Royal Holloway, University of London. She was also an Honorary Research Fellow at University of London and has also been awarded fellowships at the Yale Center for British Art, and the Huntington Library, Art and Botanical Gardens at San Marino, CA.

== Author ==
Horwood is the author of six books on horticulture, garden design and the social history of women in horticulture, and two books on fashion history.

=== Horticulture ===
- Potted History: How Houseplants Took Over Our Homes - (Pimpernel Press, 2020)
- Beth Chatto: A life with plants - (Pimpernel Press, 2019)
- Rose - (Reaktion, 2018)
- Women and Their Gardens: A History from the Elizabethan Era to Today - (Chicago Review Press, 2012)
- Gardening Women: Their Stories From 1600 to the Present - (Virago, 2010)
- Potted History: The Story of Plants in the Home - (Frances Lincoln Publishers, 2007)

=== Dress ===
- Keeping Up Appearances: Fashion and Class Between the Wars - (The History Press, 2011)
- Worst Fashions: What We Shouldn't Have Worn. But Did - (Sutton, 2005)
