= Elmstead, Essex =

Village in Essex, England

Coordinates: 51.874°N 0.975°E

Elmstead
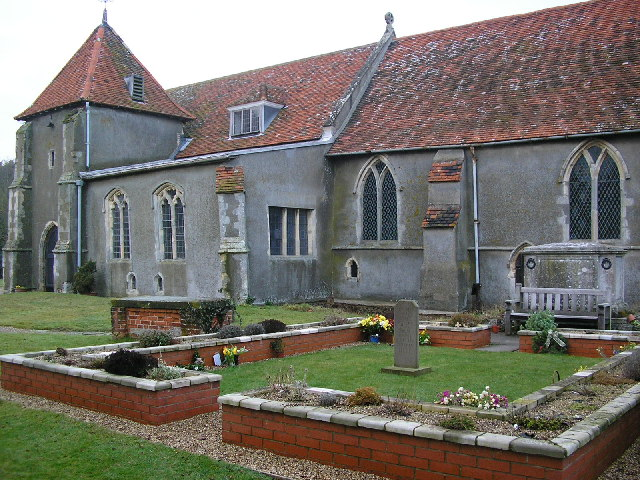
- St Anne and St Lawrence's Church

- Location within Essex
- Population: 1,987 (Parish, 2021)
- Civil parish: Elmstead
- District: Tendring
- Shire county: Essex
- Region: East
- Country: England
- Sovereign state: United Kingdom
- Post town: Colchester
- Postcode district: CO7
- Police: Essex
- Fire: Essex
- Ambulance: East of England

Elmstead is a village and civil parish in the Tendring district of Essex, England. The parish includes Elmstead Market, located south of Elmstead. At the 2021 census the parish had a population of 1,987.

== Parish Church of St Anne and St Lawrence ==
The Church of England parish church is dedicated to Saint Anne. The main parts of the church have been dated to around 1310; a South Chapel was added about 20 years later. The early 14th-century tower rises one and a half storeys and was never completed. The south wall of the chancel has a squint or leper window; these were popularly supposed to have been used by people infected by leprosy to receive Holy Communion; their exact purpose is unknown. On the sill of the east window is an oak effigy of a knight perhaps depicting Lawrence de Tany, who died in 1317.

== Nearby settlements ==
Nearby settlements include the city of Colchester, the town Wivenhoe and the villages of Alresford and Elmstead Market.

== Transport ==
For transport there is the A120 road and the A133 road nearby.
