= 2019 Colchester Borough Council election =

2019 UK local government election

- 2 May 2019

17 out of 51 seats to Colchester Borough Council 26 seats needed for a majority
- Registered: 135,607 (▲2.0%)
- Turnout: 32.6% (▼0.5%)
	First party	Second party	Third party
Leader	Darius Laws	Mark Cory	Tim Young
Party	Conservative	Liberal Democrats	Labour
Leader's seat	Castle (defeated)	Wivenhoe	Greenstead
Last election	25 seats, 40.4%	12 seats, 19.9%	11 seats, 25.3%
Seats before	25	12	11
Seats won	6	6	3
Seats after	23	13	11
Seat change	▼2	▲1	Steady
Popular vote	15,387	11,638	7,740
Percentage	35.2%	26.6%	17.7%
Swing	▼5.2%	▲6.7%	▼7.6%
	Fourth party	Fifth party
Leader	Beverly Oxford	Mark Goacher
Party	Independent	Green
Leader's seat	Highwoods	Castle
Last election	3 seats, 7.1%	0 seats, 7.0%
Seats before	3	0
Seats won	1	1
Seats after	3	1
Seat change	Steady	▲1
Popular vote	2,775	5,939
Percentage	6.3%	13.6%
Swing	▼0.8%	▲6.6%
- Winner of each seat at the 2019 Colchester Borough Council election.
Leader of the Council before election
Mark Cory
Liberal Democrats
No overall control (Note: Liberal Democrats–Labour–Independent coalition.)
Leader of the Council after election
Mark Cory
Liberal Democrats
No overall control (Note: Liberal Democrats–Labour–Independent coalition.)

The 2019 Colchester Borough Council election was held on 2 May 2019 to elect members of Colchester Borough Council in Essex, England. Seventeen members of the council (one-third of the whole) were up for election, one from each of the 17 wards.

== Result Summary ==
=== Result ===
2019 Colchester Borough Council election
Party	This election				Full council			This election		
Party	Candidates	Seats	Net	Seats %	Other	Total	Total %	Votes	Votes %	+/−
Conservative	17	6	▼2	35.3	17	23	45.1	15,387	35.2	–5.2
Liberal Democrats	17	6	▲1	35.3	7	13	25.5	11,638	26.6	+6.7
Labour	17	3	Steady	17.6	8	11	21.6	7,740	17.7	–7.6
Independent	4	1	Steady	5.9	2	3	5.9	2,775	6.3	–0.8
Green	17	1	▲1	5.9	0	1	2.0	5,939	13.6	+6.6
UKIP	1	0	Steady	0.0	0	0	0.0	248	0.6	N/A

Visual representation of the Council

=== Composition ===
Prior to the election, the composition of the council was:

↓
12	11	3	25
Liberal Democrats	Labour	Ind	Conservative

Following the election, the composition of the council was:

↓
13	11	3	1	23
Liberal Democrats	Labour	Ind	G	Conservative

== Ward results ==
The Statement of Persons Nominated was released on 4 April 2019 detailing the persons standing as candidates at the Borough Council election. Incumbent councillors standing for re-election are marked with an asterisk (*).

=== Berechurch ===
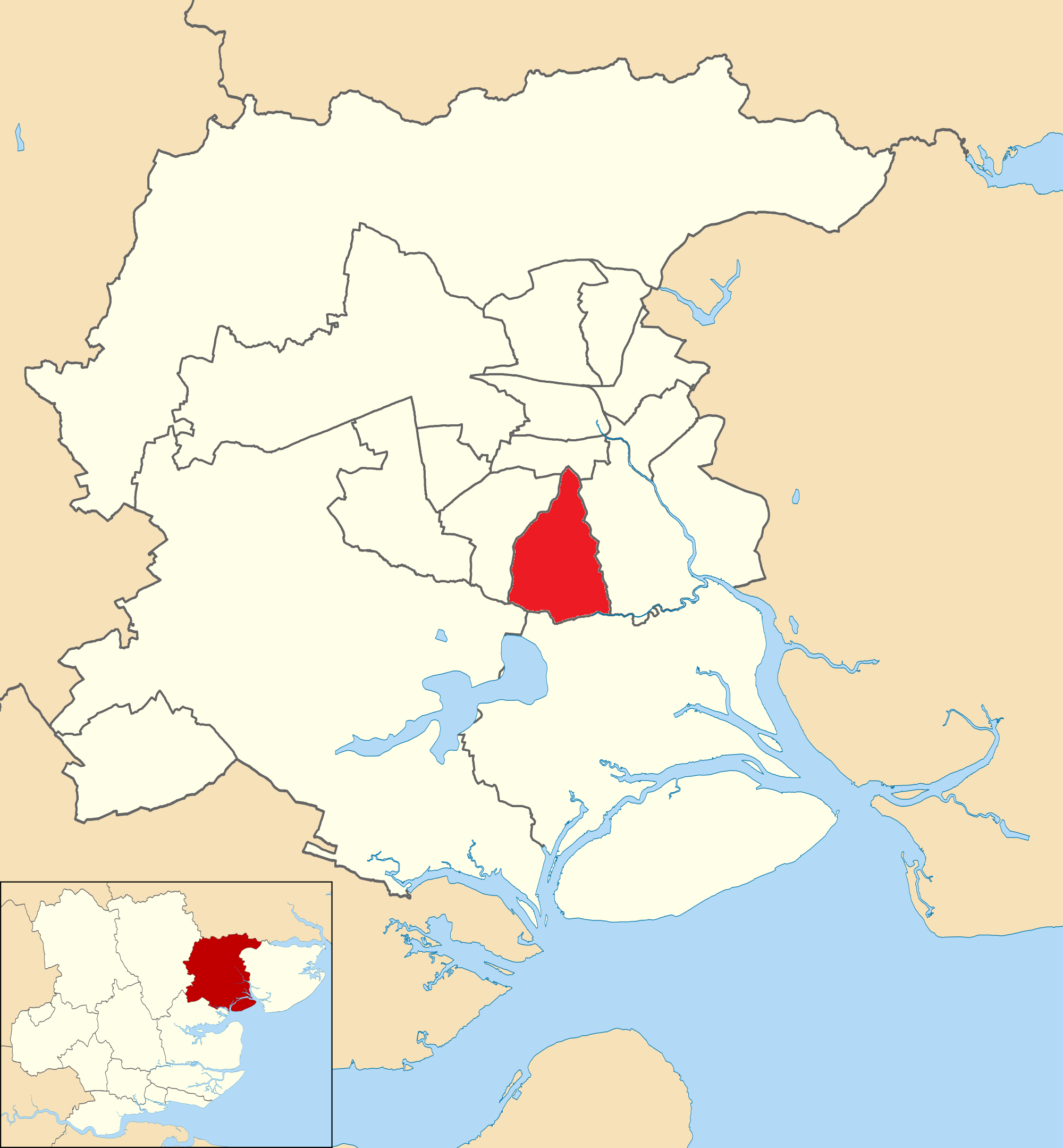
Berechurch ward

Berechurch
Party	Candidate	Votes	%	±%
Labour Co-op	Chris Pearson*	1,058	53.2	−9.4
Liberal Democrats	Mick Spindler	490	24.6	+15.9
Conservative	Fabian Green	301	15.1	−9.9
Green	Mary Bryan	142	7.1	+3.4
Majority		568	28.6	−8.9
Rejected ballots		25	1.2	
Turnout		2,016	27.4	+0.1
Registered electors		7,367		
Labour Co-op hold		Swing	▼12.7	

=== Castle ===
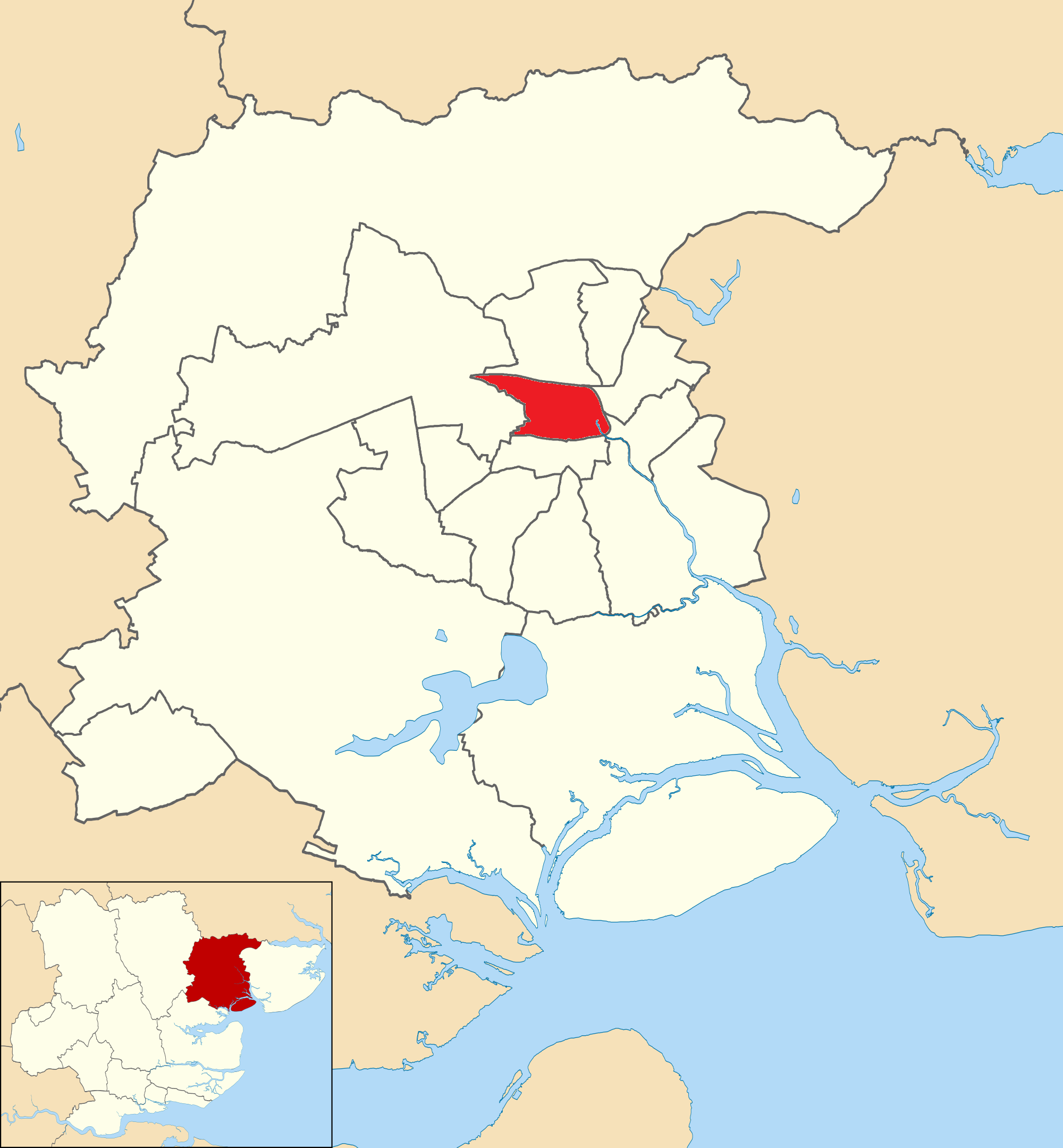
Castle ward

Castle
Party	Candidate	Votes	%	±%
Green	Mark Goacher	1,724	55.9	+25.6
Conservative	Darius Laws*	901	29.2	−1.5
Labour	Victoria Weaver	268	8.7	−16.0
Liberal Democrats	Verity Woolley	193	6.3	−8.0
Majority		823	26.7	N/A
Rejected ballots		25	0.8	
Turnout		3,111	40.5	+0.7
Registered electors		7,674		
Green gain from Conservative		Swing	▲13.6	

=== Greenstead ===
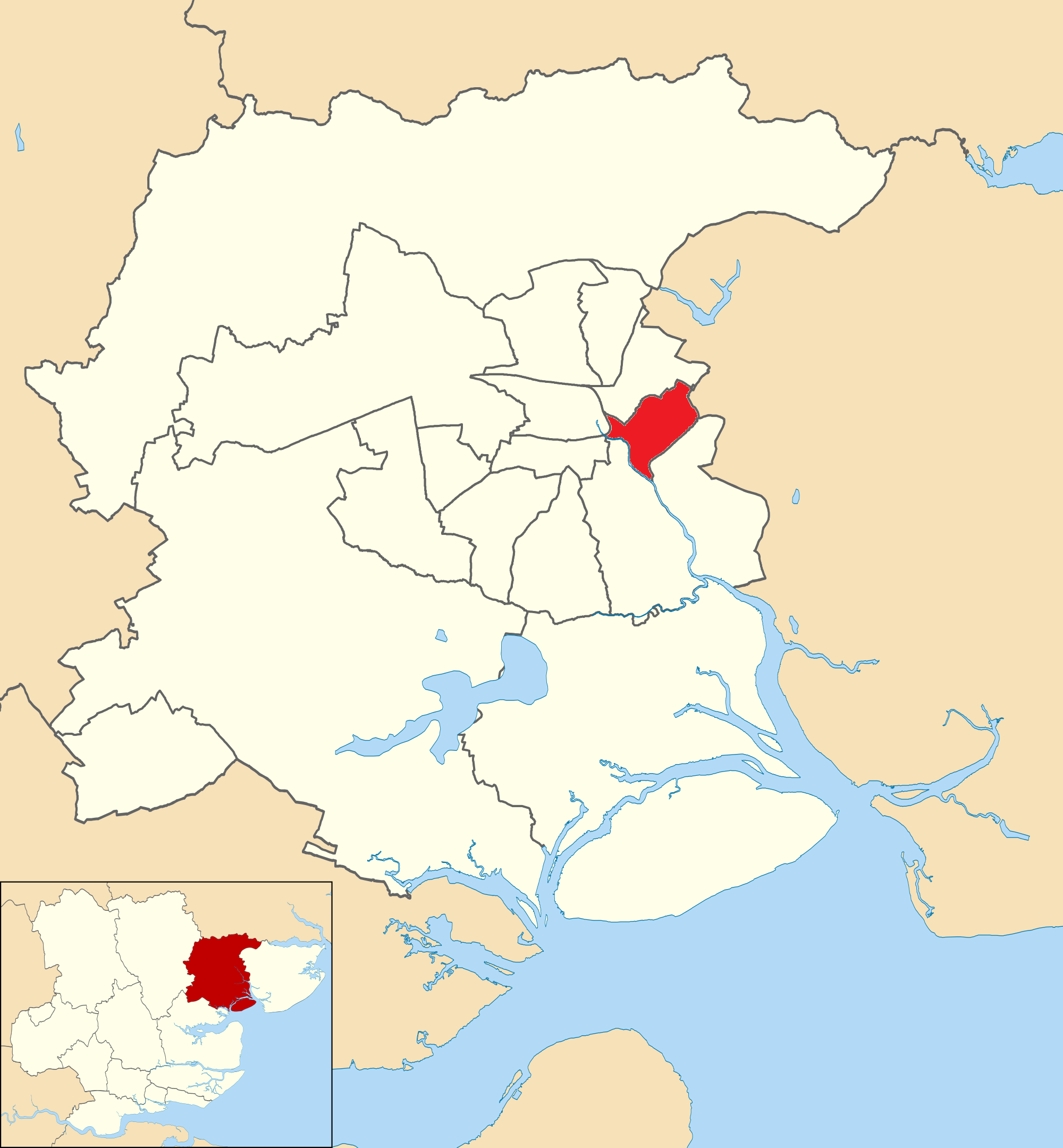
Greenstead ward

Greenstead
Party	Candidate	Votes	%	±%
Labour	Tim Young*	971	47.7	−3.8
Conservative	Christopher Piggott	388	19.0	−5.0
Liberal Democrats	Chantelle-Louise Whyborn	281	13.8	+2.1
Independent	Christopher Lee	228	11.2	+1.5
Green	John Clifton	169	8.3	+5.1
Majority		583	28.7	+1.2
Rejected ballots		30	1.5	
Turnout		2,067	20.4	−4.0
Registered electors		10,148		
Labour hold		Swing	▲0.6	

=== Highwoods ===
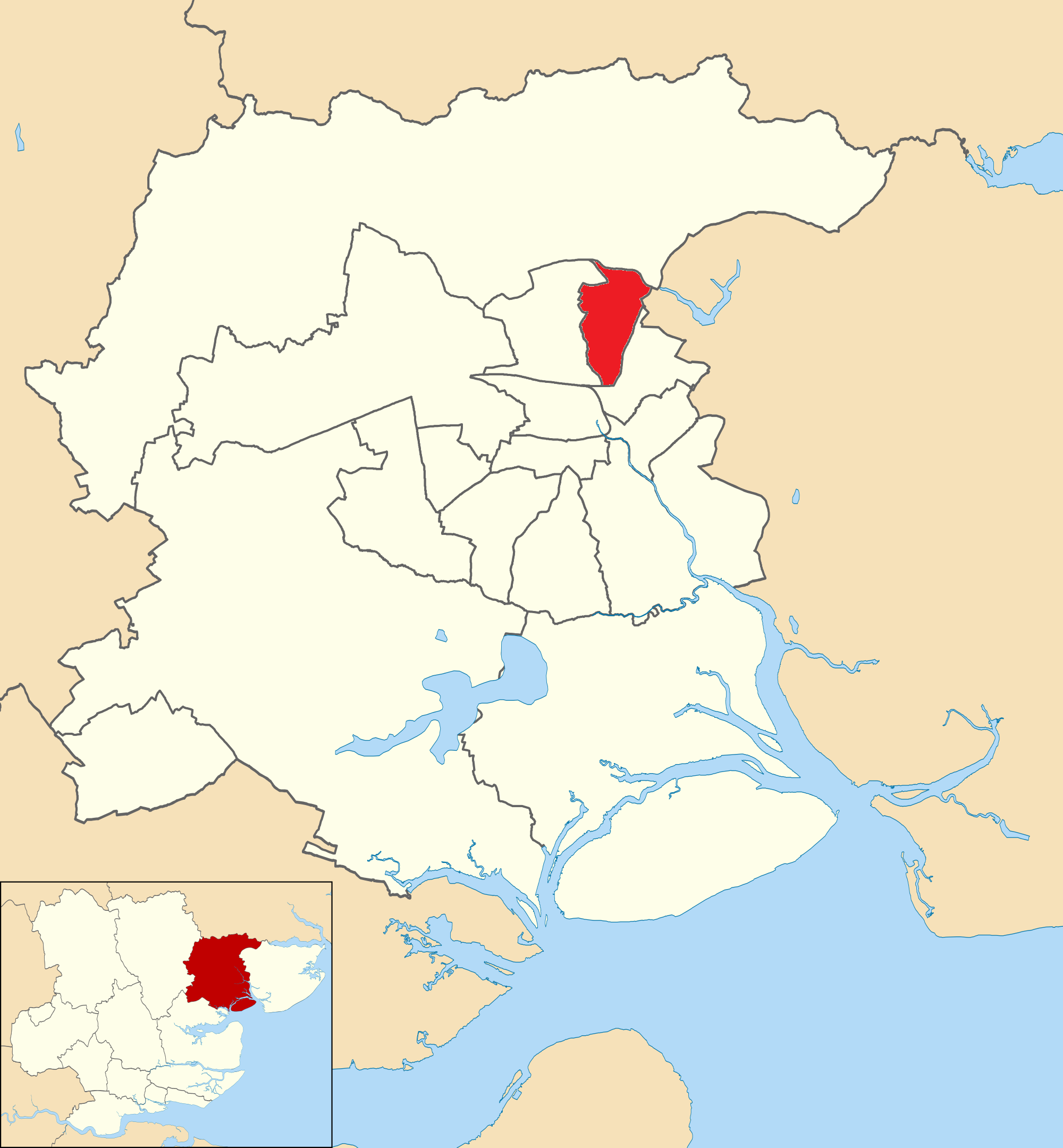
Highwoods ward

Highwoods
Party	Candidate	Votes	%	±%
Independent	Beverly Oxford*	1,119	52.6	+7.2
Conservative	Stephen Rowe	409	19.3	−8.3
Labour	Jocelyn Law	247	11.6	−3.8
Liberal Democrats	Mick Turrell	196	9.2	+1.3
Green	Robbie Spence	155	7.3	+3.6
Majority		710	33.3	+15.1
Rejected ballots		10	0.5	
Turnout		2,136	29.4	+1.8
Registered electors		7,273		
Independent hold		Swing	▲7.8	

=== Lexden & Braiswick ===
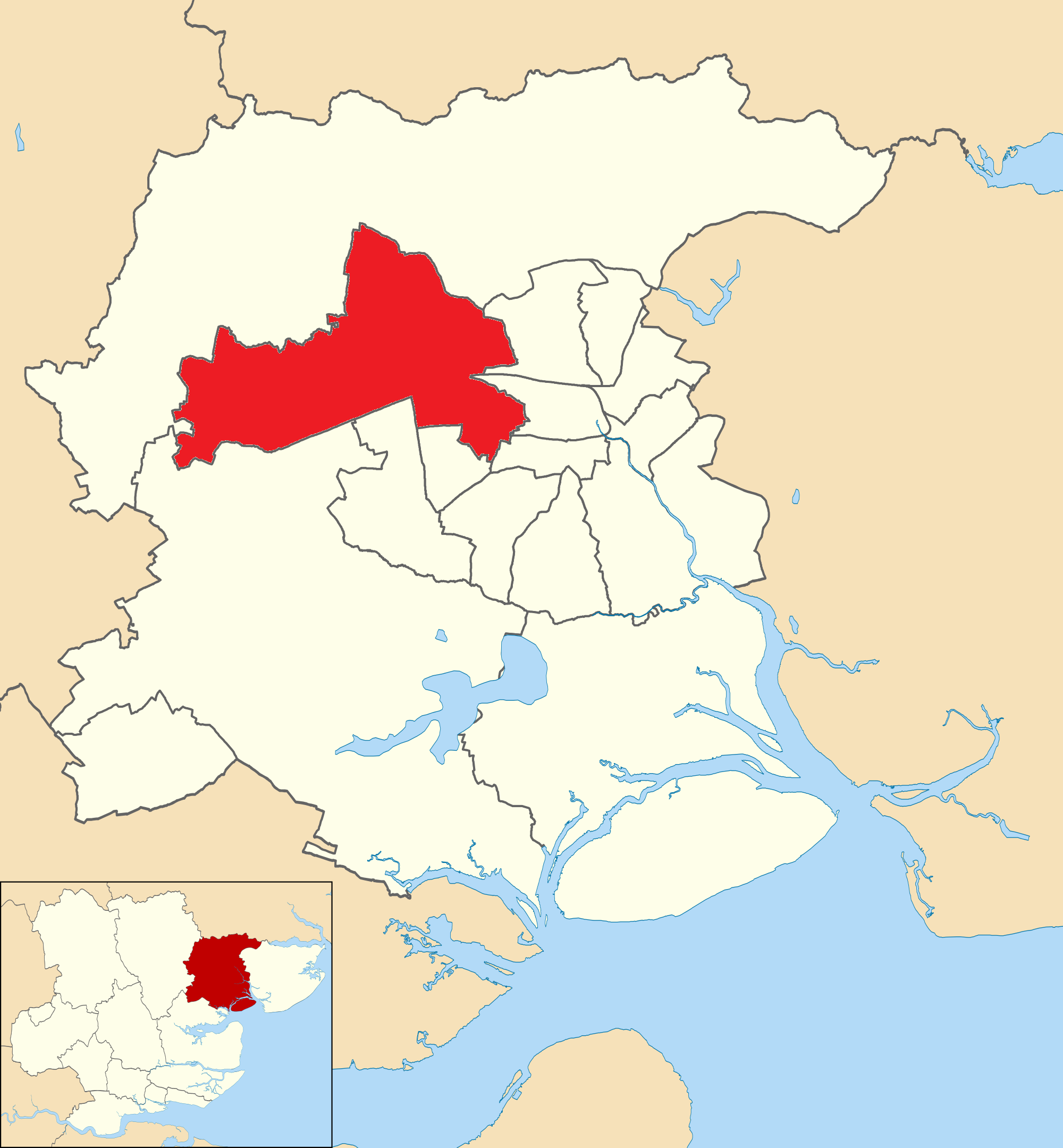
Lexden & Braiswick ward

Lexden & Braiswick
Party	Candidate	Votes	%	±%
Conservative	Lewis Barber*	1,745	62.3	−3.9
Liberal Democrats	Thomas Stevenson	442	15.8	+0.9
Green	Roger Bamforth	403	14.5	+7.9
Labour	Conrad Winch	209	7.5	−4.8
Majority		1,303	46.5	−4.8
Rejected ballots		24	0.9	
Turnout		2,823	39.2	+1.4
Registered electors		7,205		
Conservative hold		Swing	▼1.5	

=== Marks Tey & Layer ===
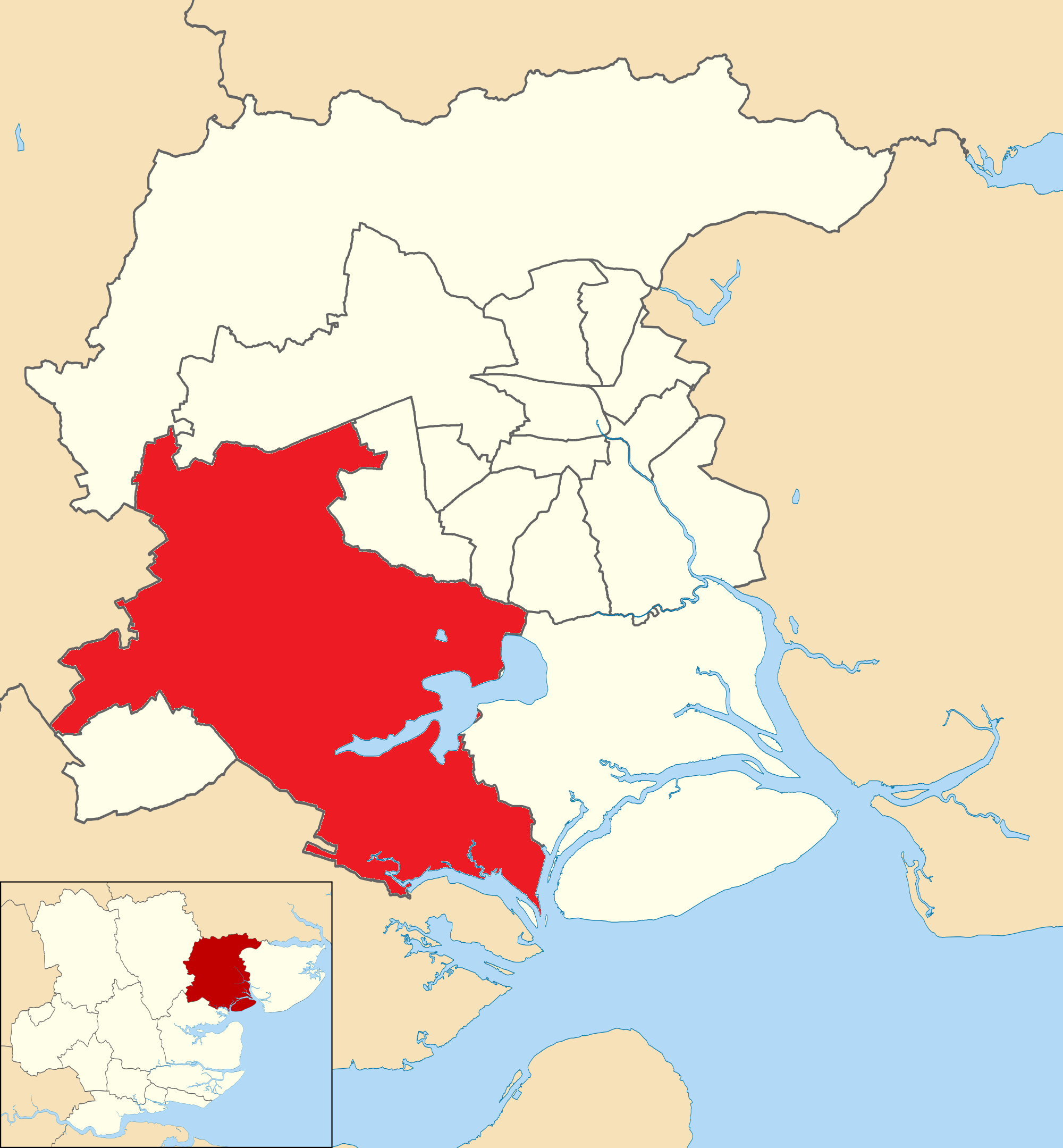
Marks Tey & Layer ward

Marks Tey & Layer
Party	Candidate	Votes	%	±%
Conservative	Andrew Ellis*	1,560	64.6	−6.6
Green	Matt Stemp	345	14.3	+9.2
Liberal Democrats	Mark Hull	328	13.6	+2.9
Labour	Jan Plummer	180	7.5	−5.6
Majority		1,215	50.3	+9.1
Rejected ballots		31	1.3	
Turnout		2,444	32.6	−2.1
Registered electors		7,488		
Conservative hold		Swing	▼7.9	

=== Mersea & Pyefleet ===
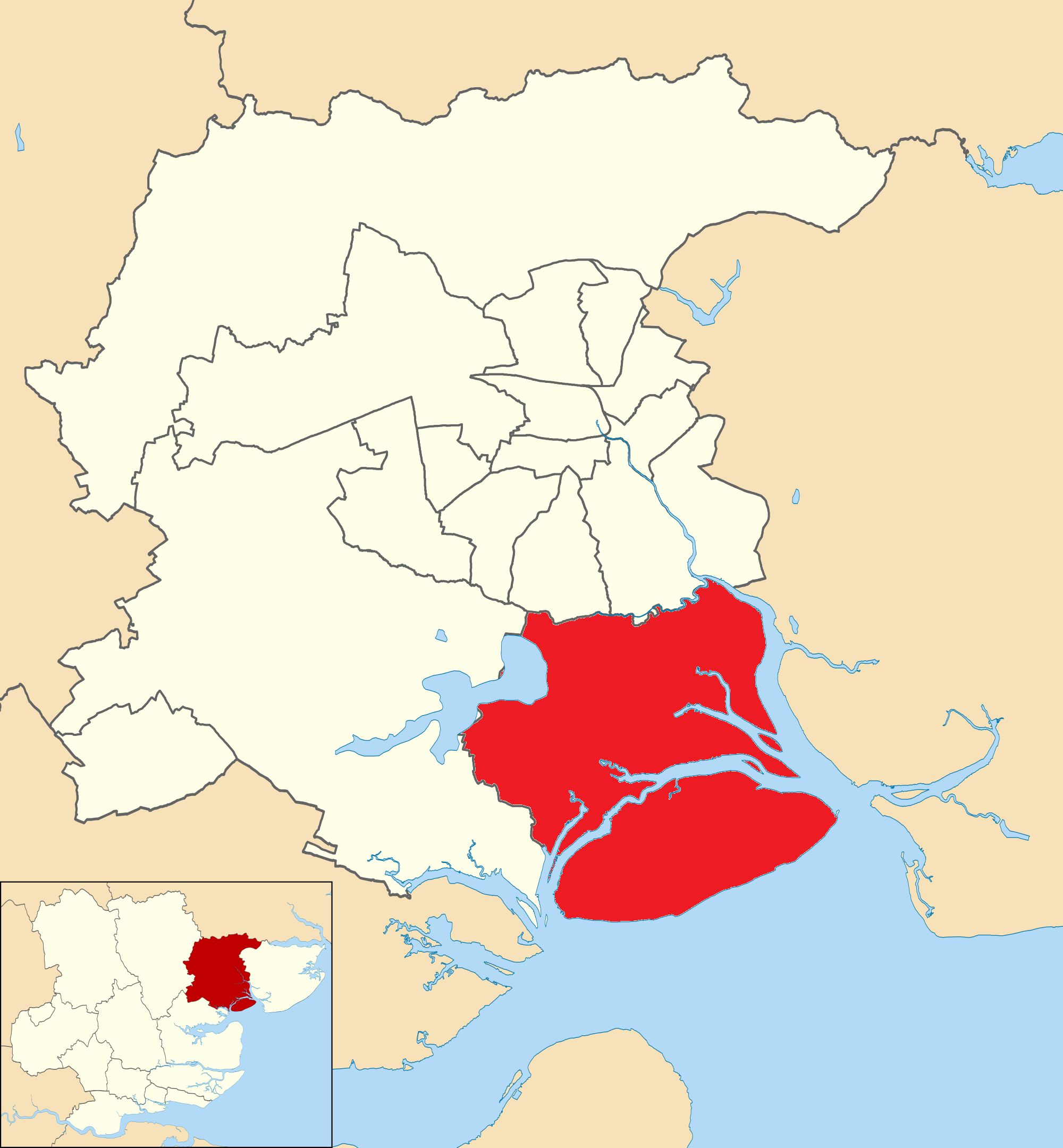
Mersea & Pyefleet ward

Mersea & Pyefleet
Party	Candidate	Votes	%	±%
Conservative	Patricia Moore*	1,026	30.3	−11.7
Independent	John Akker	969	28.6	−8.2
Independent	Carl Powling	459	13.5	N/A
Green	Peter Banks	310	9.1	−2.3
Labour	Bry Mogridge	263	7.8	+1.1
UKIP	David Broise	248	7.3	N/A
Liberal Democrats	Jenny Stevens	114	3.4	+0.4
Majority		57	1.7	−3.5
Rejected ballots		24	0.7	
Turnout		3,413	42.4	+1.9
Registered electors		8,052		
Conservative hold		Swing	▼1.8	

=== Mile End ===
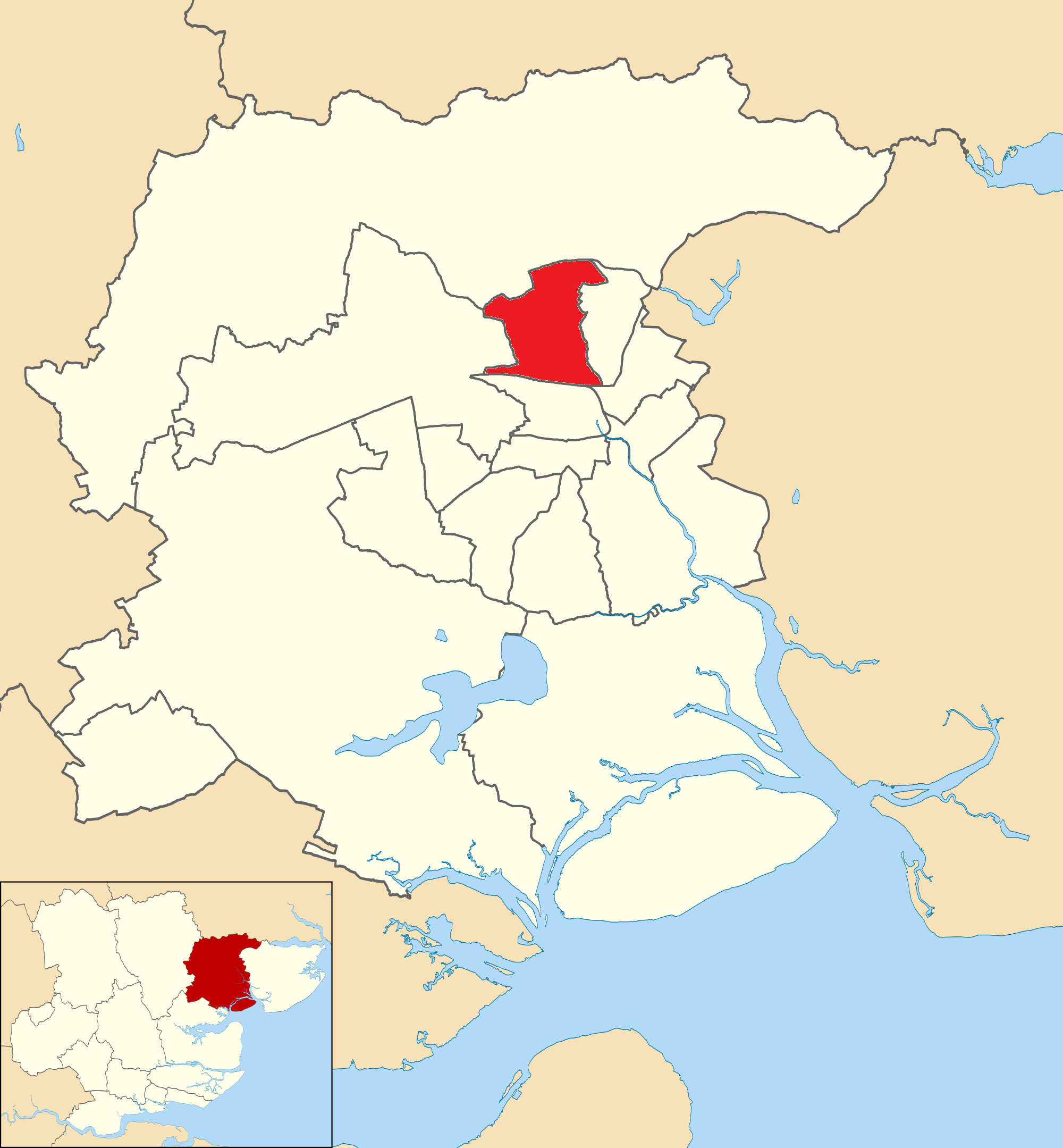
Mile End ward

Mile End
Party	Candidate	Votes	%	±%
Liberal Democrats	Phil Coleman*	1,447	62.2	+13.1
Conservative	Natalie Rowe	463	19.9	−10.4
Green	Amanda Kirke	216	9.3	+5.2
Labour	Sarah Ryder	201	8.6	−6.1
Majority		984	42.7	+23.9
Rejected ballots		16	0.7	
Turnout		2,343	28.6	−2.3
Registered electors		8,182		
Liberal Democrats hold		Swing	▲11.8	

No Independent candidate as previous (−1.8%).

=== New Town & Christ Church ===
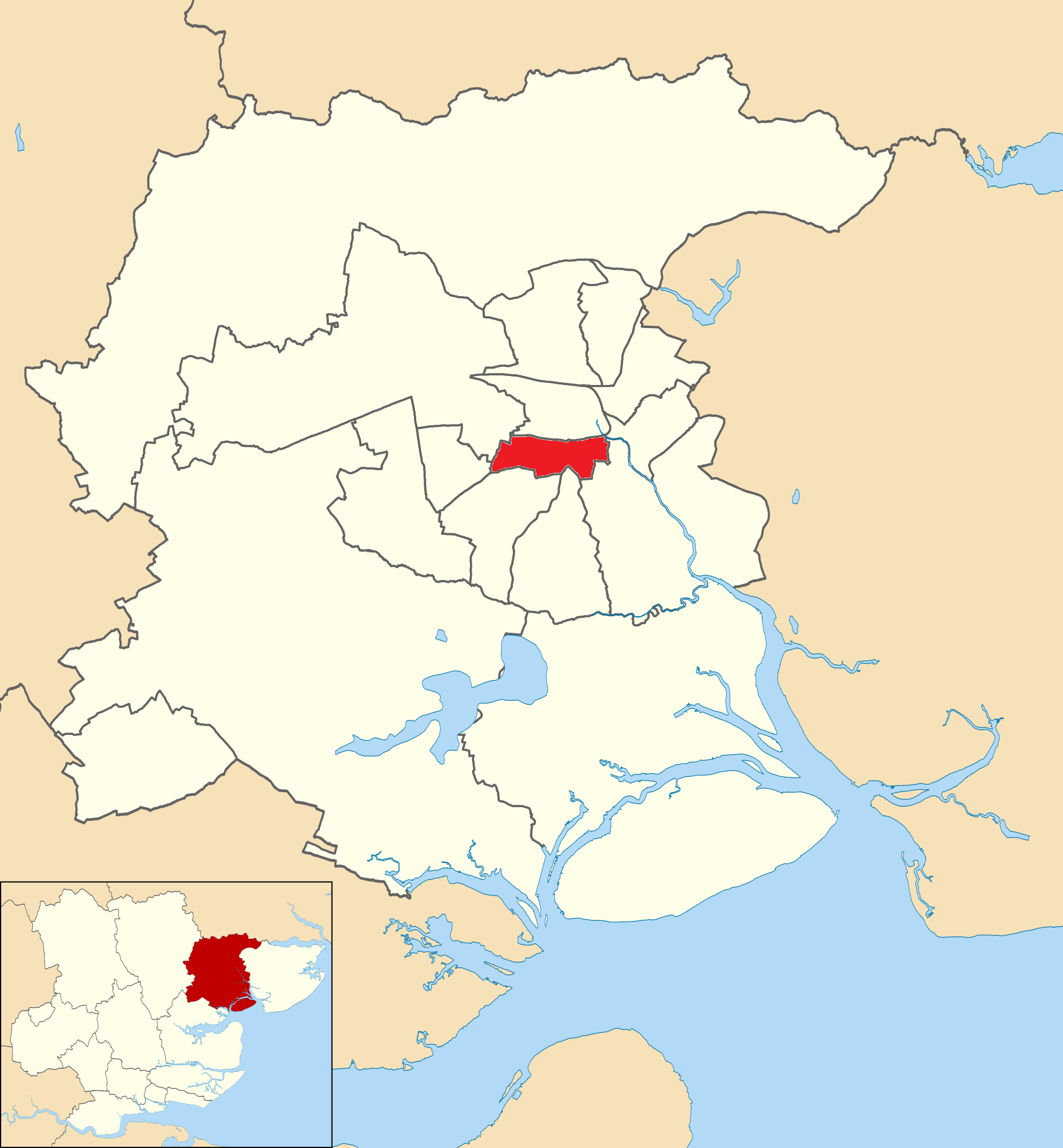
New Town & Christ Church ward

New Town & Christ Church
Party	Candidate	Votes	%	±%
Liberal Democrats	Nick Cope*	1,128	36.2	+10.4
Labour	Elisa Vasquez-Walters	992	31.9	−9.8
Conservative	Carla Hales	604	19.4	−5.2
Green	Bob Brannan	390	12.5	+6.9
Majority		136	4.3	N/A
Rejected ballots		25	0.8	
Turnout		3,139	33.4	−0.4
Registered electors		9,415		
Liberal Democrats hold		Swing	▲10.1	

No Independent candidate as previous (−2.3%).

=== Old Heath & The Hythe ===
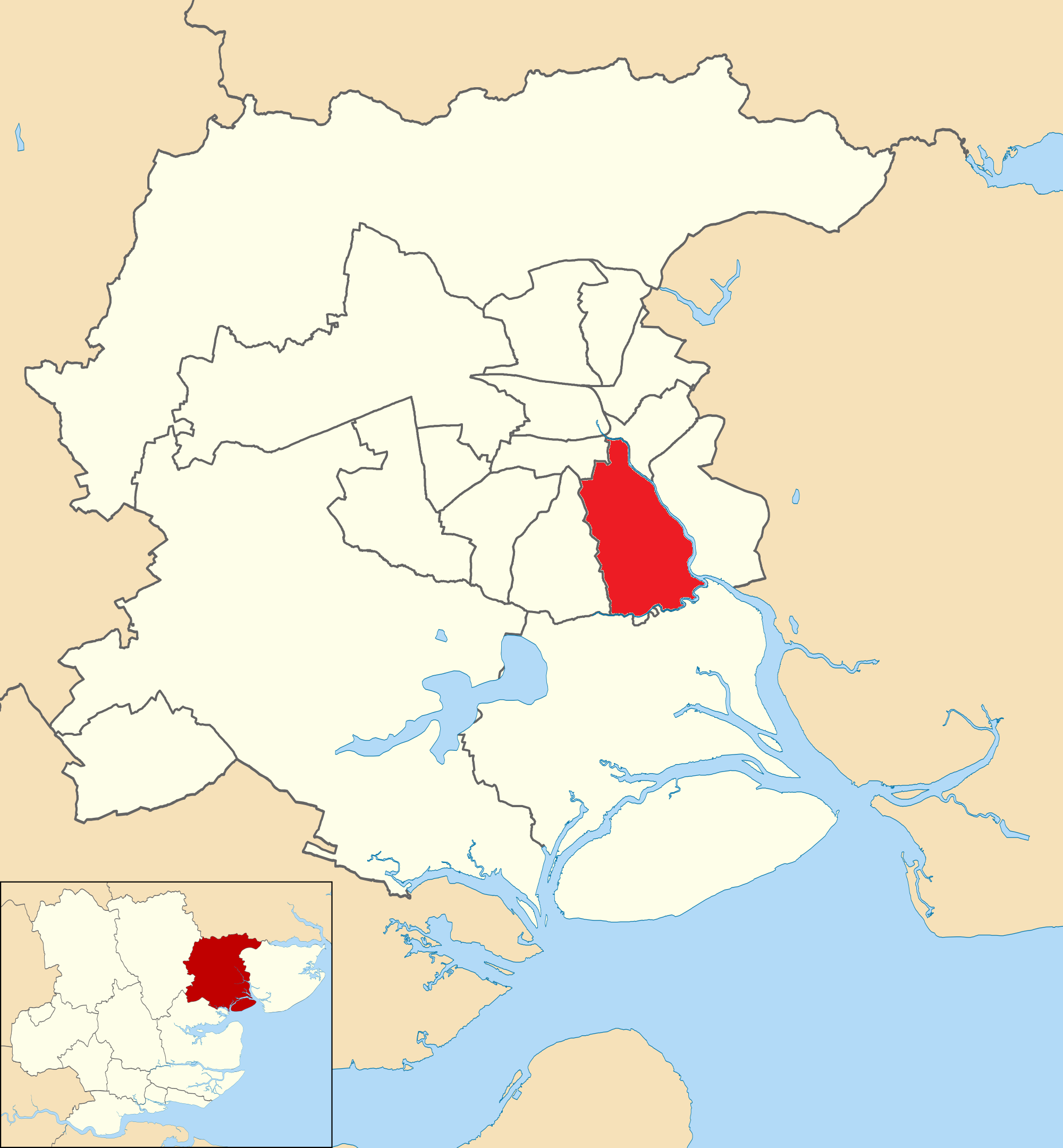
Old Heath & The Hythe ward

Old Heath & The Hythe
Party	Candidate	Votes	%	±%
Labour	Adam Fox*	1,181	52.0	−9.5
Conservative	Michael McDonnell	475	20.9	+0.5
Green	Andrew Canessa	323	14.2	+9.0
Liberal Democrats	Mark Kiley	292	12.9	+3.7
Majority		706	31.1	−10.0
Rejected ballots		28	1.2	
Turnout		2,299	27.5	−3.3
Registered electors		8,349		
Labour hold		Swing	▼5.0	

No Independent candidate as previous (−3.8%).

=== Prettygate ===
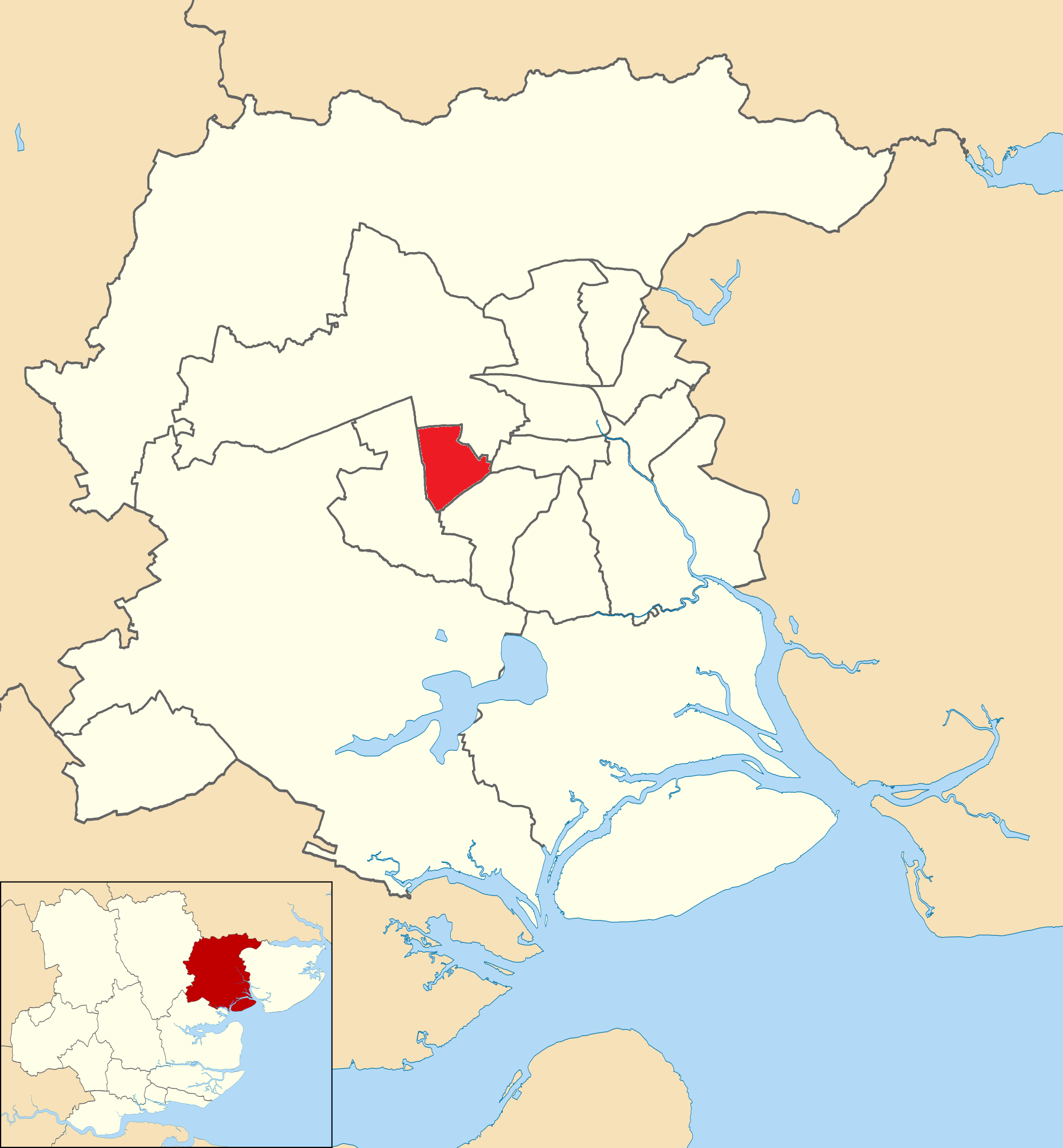
Prettygate ward

Prettygate
Party	Candidate	Votes	%	±%
Conservative	Beverly Davies*	1,520	54.1	−6.9
Liberal Democrats	John Loxley	600	21.4	+9.5
Labour	Jamie Overland	351	12.5	−7.3
Green	Clare Palmer	336	12.0	+4.8
Majority		920	32.7	−8.5
Rejected ballots		50	1.8	
Turnout		2,857	36.3	−1.3
Registered electors		7,866		
Conservative hold		Swing	▼8.2	

=== Rural North ===
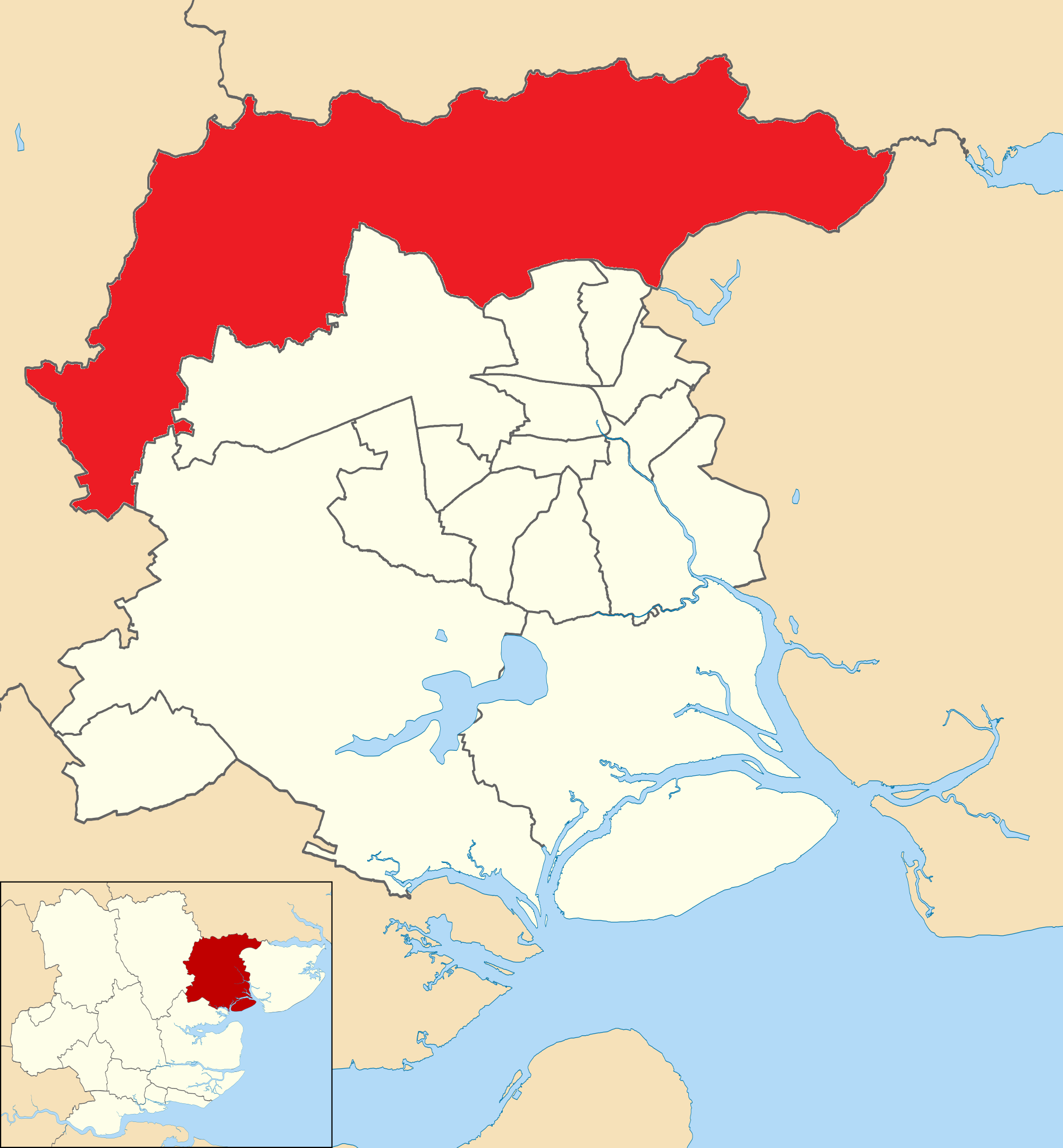
Rural North ward

Rural North
Party	Candidate	Votes	%	±%
Conservative	Nigel Chapman*	1,786	61.4	−7.1
Green	Sue Bailey	454	15.6	+6.0
Liberal Democrats	Will Brown	445	15.3	+5.2
Labour	Judith Short	225	7.7	−4.1
Majority		1,332	45.8	−10.9
Rejected ballots		41	1.4	
Turnout		2,951	34.9	+0.3
Registered electors		8,455		
Conservative hold		Swing	▼6.6	

=== Shrub End ===
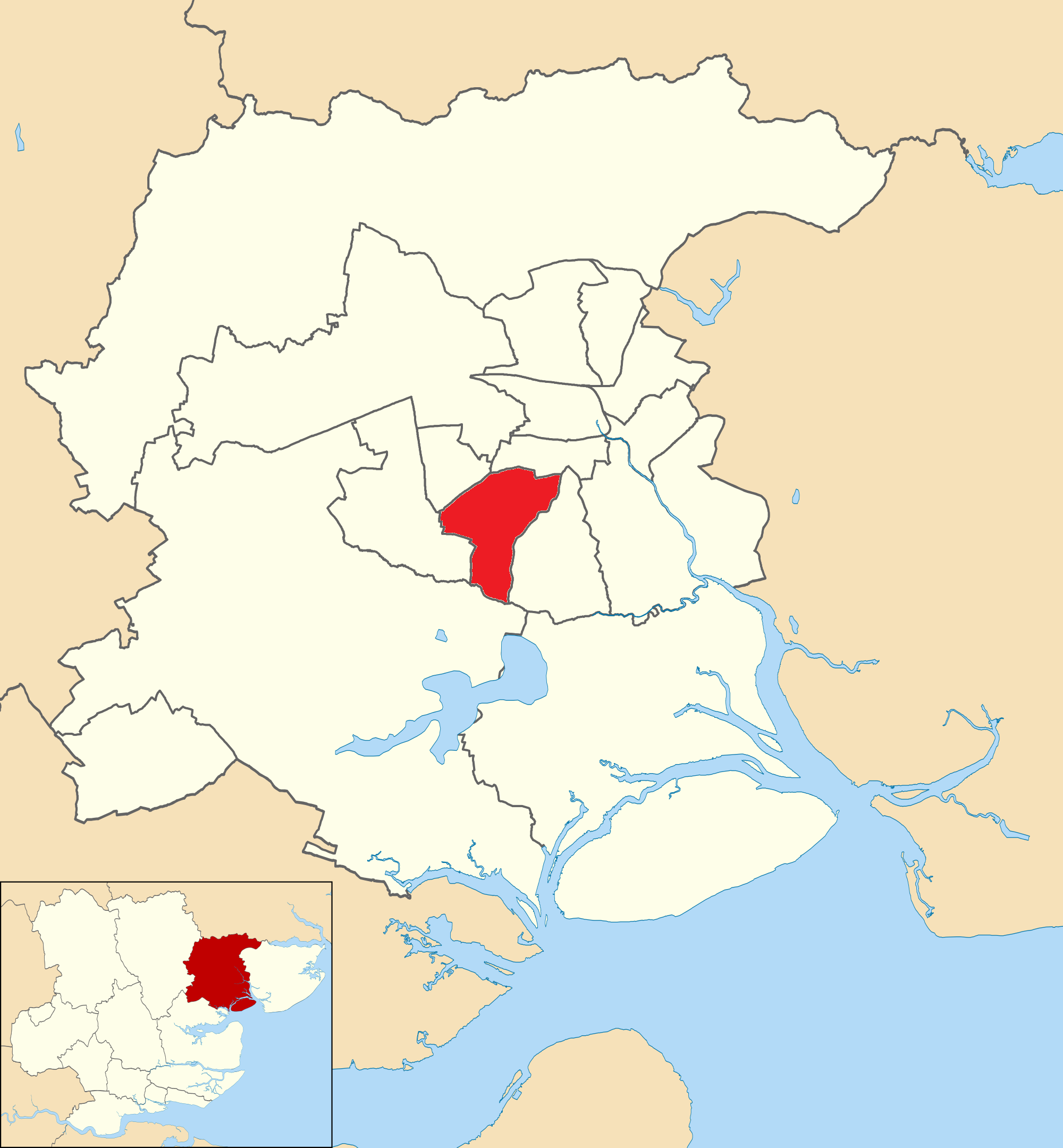
Shrub End ward

Shrub End
Party	Candidate	Votes	%	±%
Liberal Democrats	Sam McCarthy	878	41.6	+16.7
Conservative	Vic Flores*	714	33.8	−4.4
Labour Co-op	Rosalind Scott	364	17.3	−13.3
Green	Blake Roberts	154	7.3	+2.5
Majority		164	7.8	N/A
Rejected ballots		26	1.2	
Turnout		2,136	27.3	+1.8
Registered electors		7,820		
Liberal Democrats gain from Conservative		Swing	▲10.6	

No Independent candidate as previous (−3.8%).

=== St. Anne's & St. John's ===
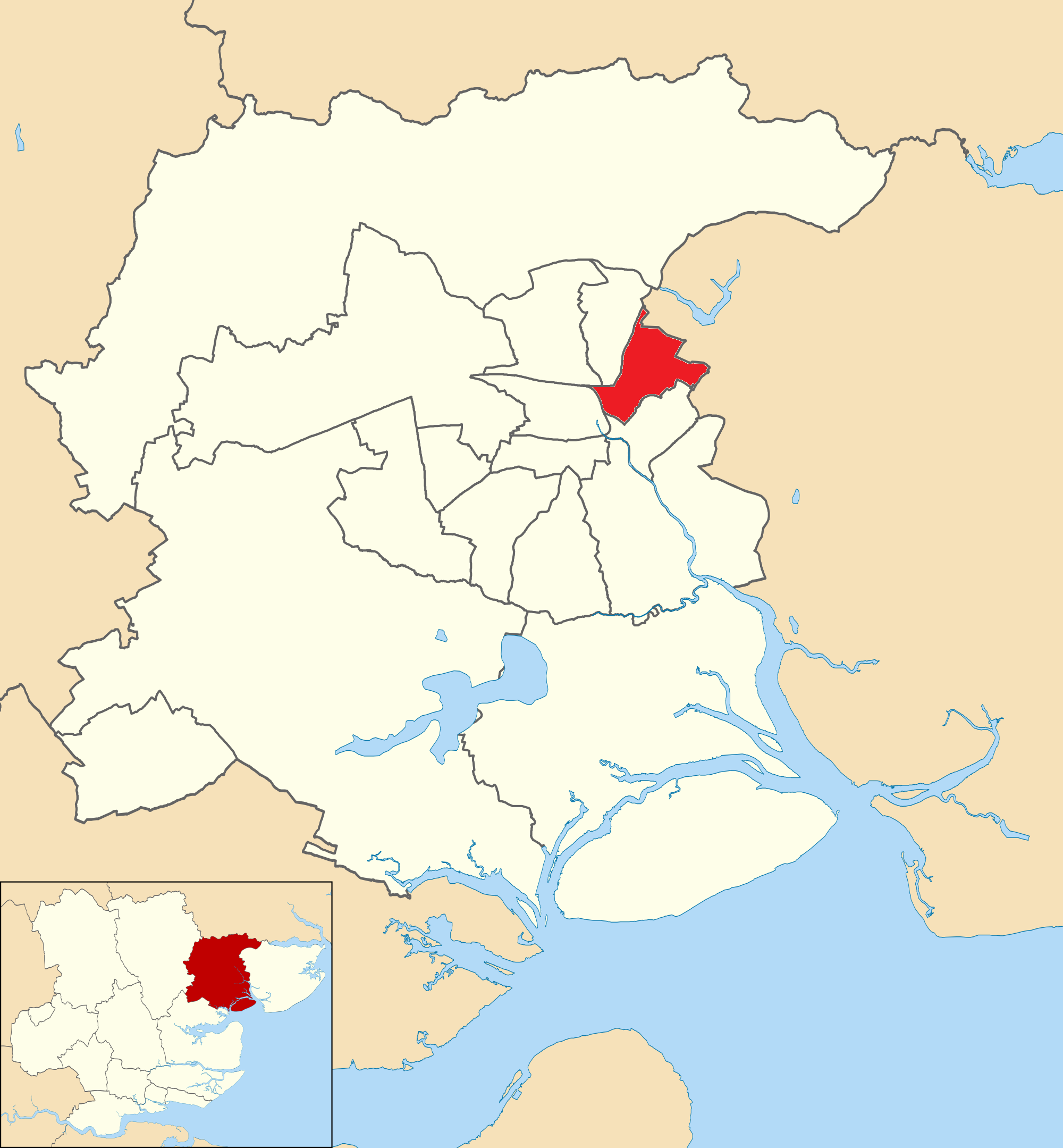
St. Anne's & St. John's ward

St. Anne's & St. John's
Party	Candidate	Votes	%	±%
Liberal Democrats	Helen Chuah*	1,238	44.4	+7.5
Conservative	Thomas Rowe	1,118	40.1	−3.3
Green	Megan Maltby	217	7.8	+4.0
Labour	HK Norman	213	7.7	−4.7
Majority		120	4.3	N/A
Rejected ballots		38	1.3	
Turnout		2,824	34.3	+0.1
Registered electors		8,235		
Liberal Democrats hold		Swing	▲5.4	

No Independent candidate as previous (−3.5%).

=== Stanway ===
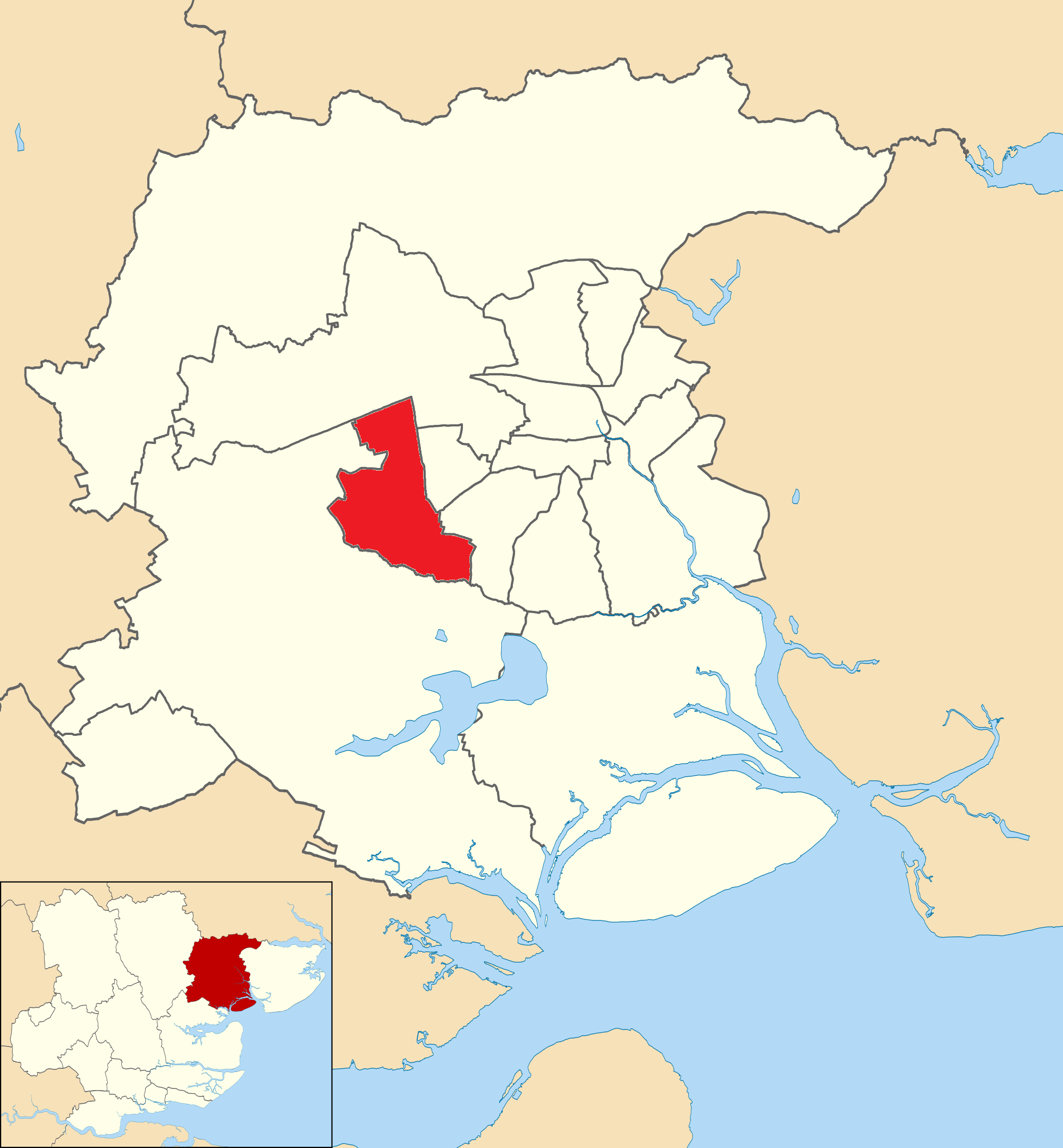
Stanway ward

Stanway
Party	Candidate	Votes	%	±%
Liberal Democrats	Lesley Scott-Boutell*	1,237	52.7	+13.1
Conservative	Jeremy Hagon	795	33.9	−12.1
Green	Katie Francis	171	7.3	+3.4
Labour	John Spademan	143	6.1	−4.3
Majority		442	18.8	N/A
Rejected ballots		15	0.6	
Turnout		2,361	35.0	+1.8
Registered electors		6,756		
Liberal Democrats hold		Swing	▲12.6	

=== Tiptree ===
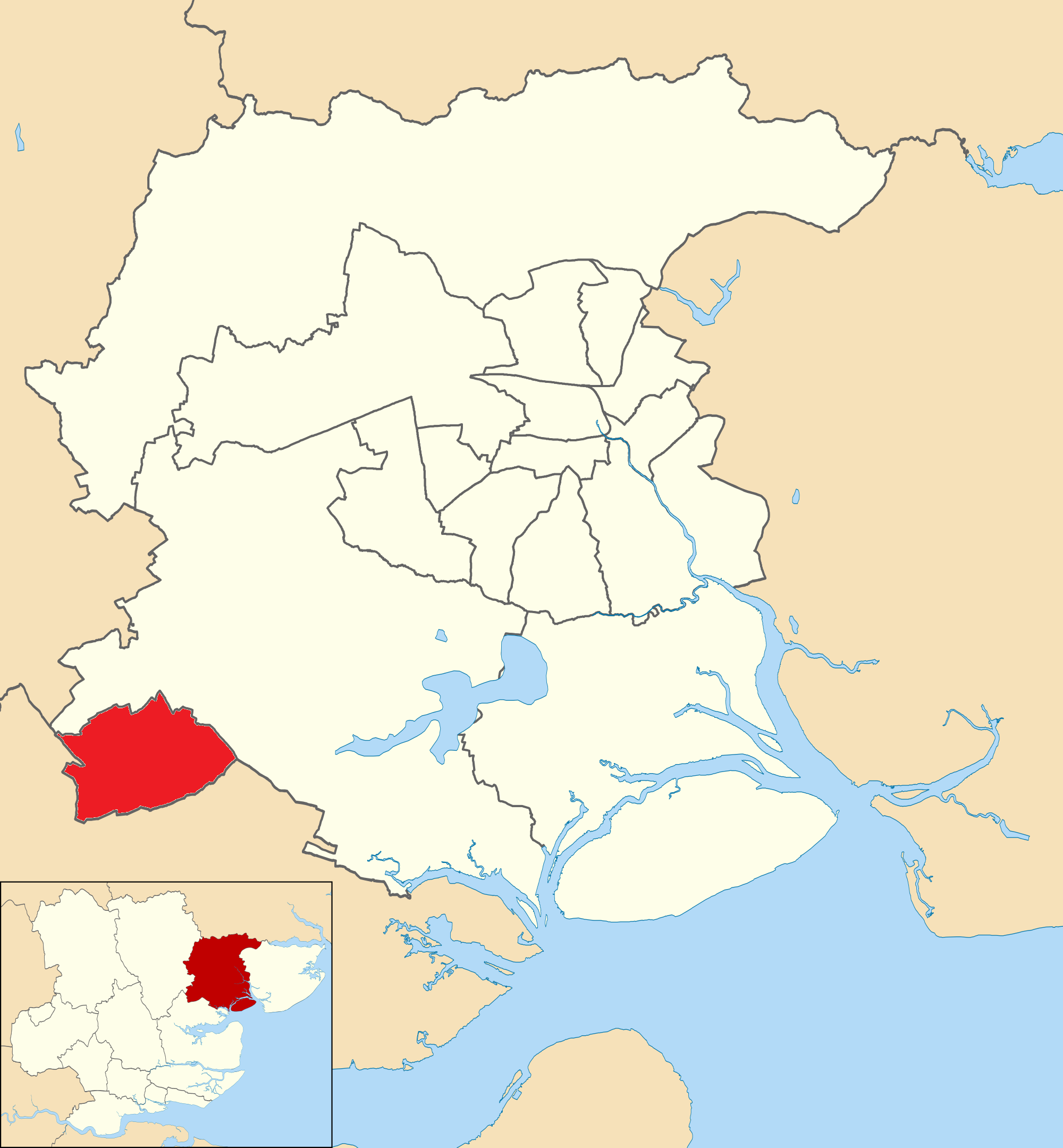
Tiptree ward

Tiptree
Party	Candidate	Votes	%	±%
Conservative	Barbara Wood*	1,315	64.2	−2.4
Labour	Paul Jeffs	303	14.8	−4.1
Green	Wolfgang Fauser	232	11.3	+6.0
Liberal Democrats	Gemma Graham	198	9.7	+0.5
Majority		1,012	49.4	+1.7
Rejected ballots		47	2.2	
Turnout		2,095	29.3	−0.1
Registered electors		7,156		
Conservative hold		Swing	▲0.9	

=== Wivenhoe ===
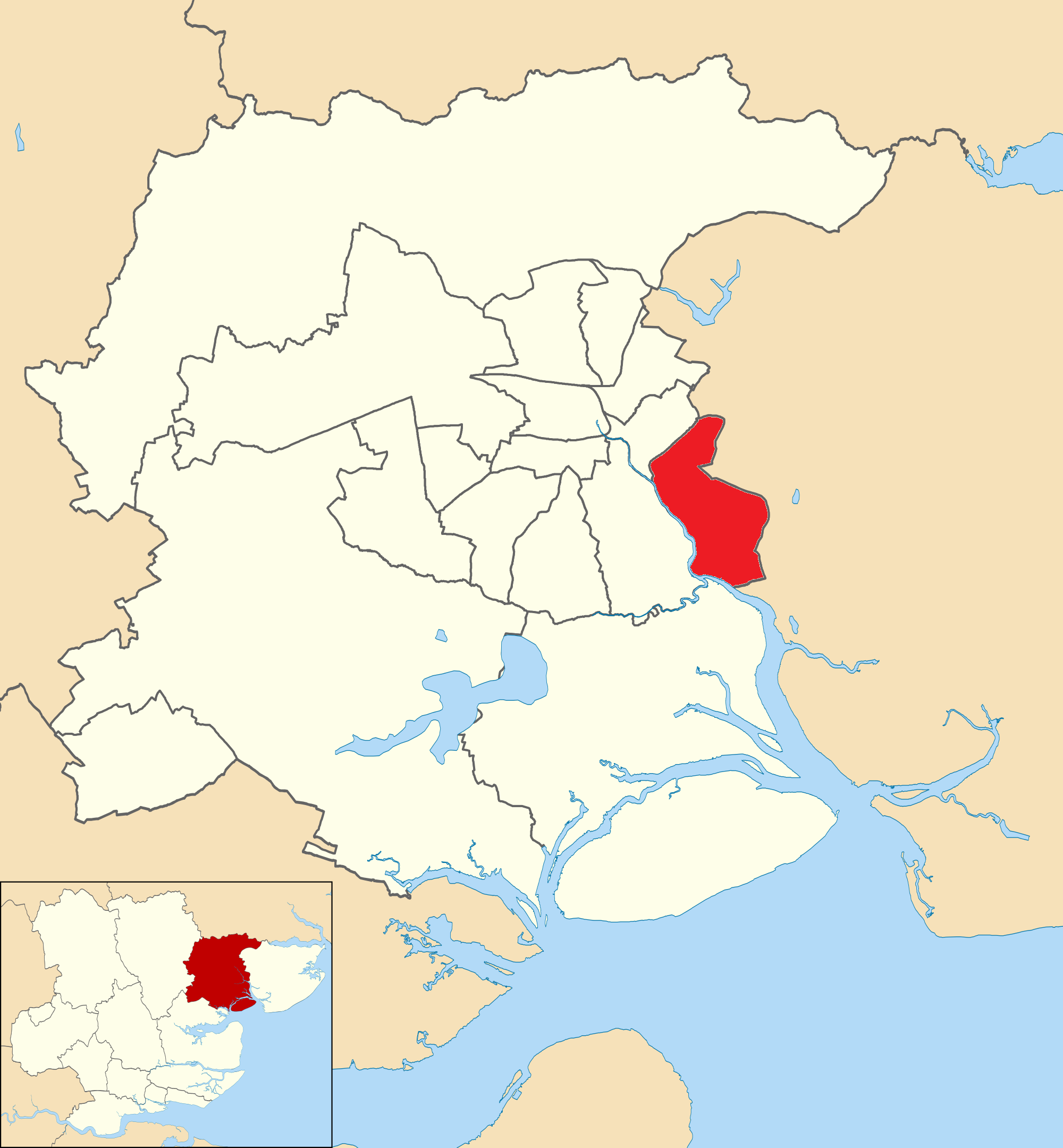
Wivenhoe ward

Wivenhoe
Party	Candidate	Votes	%	±%
Liberal Democrats	Mark Cory*	2,131	67.3	+17.8
Labour	Harry Nathan	571	18.0	−18.7
Conservative	Jodie Clark	267	8.4	−2.1
Green	John McArthur	198	6.3	+2.9
Majority		1,560	49.3	+36.5
Rejected ballots		27	0.8	
Turnout		3,194	39.1	−0.7
Registered electors		8,166		
Liberal Democrats hold		Swing	▲18.3	

== Post-election changes ==
- Conservative councillor Beverly Davies, elected for Prettygate at this election, stepped down before the 2021 election; the resulting vacancy was filled in a combined poll alongside the ward's ordinary 2021 election.
- Conservative councillor Brian Jarvis, first elected for Lexden & Braiswick in 2018, stood down before the 2021 election; the resulting vacancy was filled in a combined poll alongside the ward's ordinary 2021 election.
