= Beth Chatto =

English garden designer (1923–2018)

Beth Chatto OBE VMH
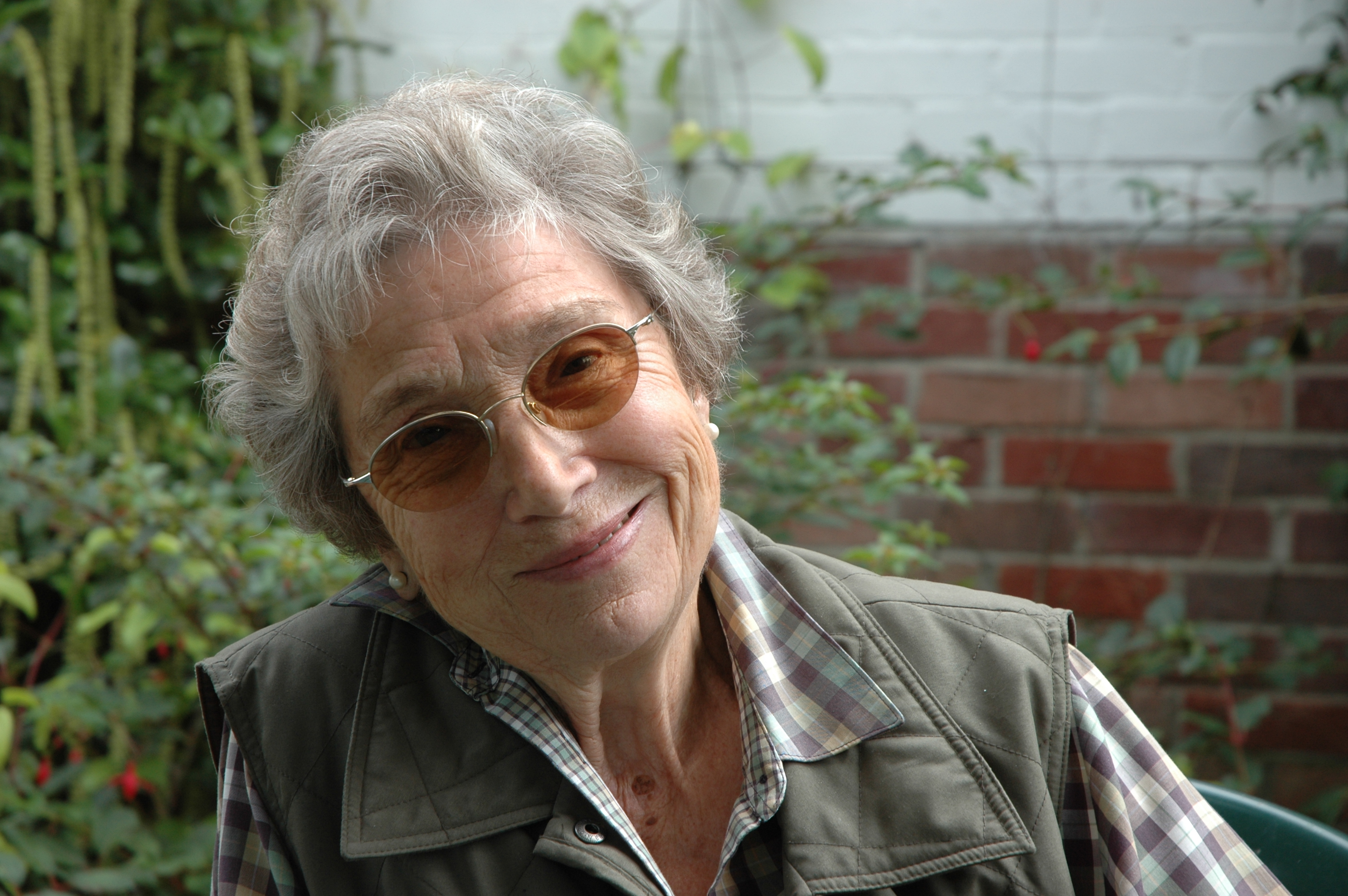
- Chatto in 2005
- Born: Bessie Diana Little; 27 June 1923; Good Easter, Essex, UK
- Died: 13 May 2018 (aged 94); Elmstead Market, Essex, UK
- Education: Colchester County High School for Girls; Hockerill College
- Occupations: Plantswoman, garden designer, author
- Known for: Beth Chatto Gardens

Beth Chatto OBE VMH (27 June 1923 – 13 May 2018) was an English plantswoman, garden designer and author known for creating and describing the gardens named after her near Elmstead Market, Essex. She wrote several books about gardening under specific conditions and lectured on this in Britain, North America, Australia, the Netherlands and Germany. Her principle of placing the right plant in the right place drew on her husband Andrew Chatto's lifelong research into garden-plant origins.

== Biography ==
She was born Bessie Diana Little at Good Easter, Essex, to Bessie (née Styles) and William Little. She had a twin brother, Seley, to whom she remained close in adulthood. (Beth Chatto's Garden Notebook, October, p. 278.) Her parents were themselves keen gardeners. She was educated at Colchester County High School for Girls before training as a teacher at Hockerill College, Bishop's Stortford. She adopted the name Beth in her twenties.

In the early 1940s, she met Andrew Chatto, a fruit farmer, namesake grandson of the founder of the publishing firm Chatto & Windus. Their shared love of plants helped to bring them together and they married in 1943. The couple lived in Braiswick, Colchester, where their two daughters, Diana and Mary, were born in 1946 and 1948. In 1960, they moved into the new White Barn House, built on the farm at Elmstead Market. At this time, they became friends with Sir Cedric Morris, who ran an art school at Dedham, Essex, attended by Francis Bacon and Lucian Freud. Chatto learned much of planting techniques from Morris, but his advice that she should move house if she wanted to create a truly great garden was less welcomed. With another friend, Pamela Underwood, Chatto became interested in flower arranging and the pair were founder members of the second flower arranging club in the country, in Colchester. From the late 1950s, Chatto was involved in the Flower Club movement.

From 1960, the Chattos worked on developing their gardens and in 1967 the nursery was opened. In 1978, Beth Chatto's first book, The Dry Garden, was published by J. M. Dent. She contributed to articles for the international and national press and appeared in international media. She worked with a team on developing the gardens and continued to inspect and approve their work until the day before she died, at the age of 94, on 13 May 2018. Her husband had pre-deceased her by almost 20 years, dying in 1999.

In her later years, Chatto commissioned Catherine Horwood to write about her life and her work. Beth Chatto: A Life with Plants was published in 2019 by Pimpernel Press.

== The Beth Chatto Gardens ==
Construction of the Beth Chatto Gardens at Elmstead Market, near Colchester, began in 1960. It was attached to the Chatto family home, on land that had previously been part of their fruit farm. It had not been farmed before, as the soil was considered too dry in places, too wet in others and the whole area had been allowed to grow wild with blackthorn, willow and brambles. The only plants to survive from the earliest days are the ancient boundary oaks surrounding the garden.

The Beth Chatto Gardens comprise a varied range of planting sites totalling 7 acres (2.8 ha), including dry, sun-baked gravel, water and marginal planting, woodland, shady, heavy clay and alpine planting. They now include the Gravel Garden, Woodland Garden, Water Garden, Long Shady Walk, Reservoir Garden (redesigned by the Head Gardener, Åsa Gregers-Warg, and the Garden and Nursery Director, David Ward, with input from Chatto) and Scree Garden. The development of these sites prompted Chatto to write books on gardening about what could be considered as "problem areas", using plants that nature has developed to survive under differing conditions.

== Exhibitions ==
In January 1975, Chatto created a small winter garden at one of the Royal Horticultural Society Halls, London SW1. More exhibits followed and eventually the Beth Chatto Gardens "Unusual Plants" exhibition arrived at the Chelsea Flower Show. Her exhibits won ten consecutive Gold Medals there from 1977 to 1987, except that she did not exhibit in 1983. Exhibits by the Beth Chatto Gardens can still be seen at the Tendring Hundred Show in Essex.

== List of publications ==
Beth Chatto was the author of many gardening books, including an exchange of letters with her friend and fellow gardener and writer Christopher Lloyd:

- The Dry Garden. Margaret Davies. J. M. Dent. 1978. ISBN 0-460-04317-X.
- The Damp Garden. illustrated by Margaret Davies. J. M. Dent. 1982. ISBN 0-460-04551-2.
- Plant Portraits. illustrated by Jill Coombs and Christine Grey-Wilson. J. M. Dent. 1985. ISBN 978-046-0-0460-08. (out of print)
- The Beth Chatto Garden Notebook. Orion. 1988. ISBN 978-046-0-0473-57.
- The Green Tapestry. photographs by Ron Sutherland and Steven Wooster. New York, NY: Simon & Schuster. 1990. ISBN 978-067-1-6703-68. (out of print, rev. ed. Beth Chatto's Green Tapestry: Perennial Plants for Your Garden, London, England, HarperCollins, 1999)
- Dear Friend and Gardener: letters exchanged between Beth Chatto and Christopher Lloyd. Frances Lincoln. 1998. ISBN 978-071-1-2122-75.
- Beth Chatto's Gravel Garden. photographs by Steven Wooster. Frances Lincoln. 2000. ISBN 978-071-1-2142-55. (reprinted in 2016 as Drought-Resistant Planting)
- Beth Chatto's Woodland Garden:Shade-Loving Plants for Year-Round Interest. photographs by Steven Wooster. Cassell. 2002. ISBN 978-030-4-3636-67.
- The Damp Garden. photographs by Steven Wooster. Cassell. 2005. ISBN 978-184-4-0304-53.
- Beth Chatto's Shade Garden. by Steven Wooster. Pimpernel Press. 2017. ISBN 978-191-0-2582-24. (previously Beth Chatto's Woodland Garden, 2008)

== Honours and awards ==
- 1987: Awarded the Lawrence Memorial Medal
- 1987: Awarded the RHS Victoria Medal of Honour
- 1987: Awarded an honorary degree by the University of Essex
- 1995: Selected to the International Professional and Business Women's Hall of Fame for outstanding achievements in introducing plant ecology to garden design
- 1998: Presented with the Life Time Achievement Award by the Garden Writers Guild
- 2002: Appointed an Officer of the Order of the British Empire (OBE) in the Queen's Birthday Honours
- 2009: Awarded an honorary degree by the Anglia Ruskin University
- 2011: Named a Paul Harris Fellow by Colchester Trinity Rotary Club
- 2014: Awarded the Society of Garden Design's John Brookes Lifetime Achievement Award

== Legacy ==
The Beth Chatto Education Trust was founded to engage all age groups with plants and gardens, and to take an ecological approach to them. The trust also sponsors the Beth Chatto Environmental Award, under the auspices of the Garden Media Guild.

The Society of Garden Designers has created a Beth Chatto Eco Garden Award to be assigned from 2020 onwards. It will focus on the ecological impact of garden designs.

== Other sources ==
- The Beth Chatto Gardens Guide Book: Early Beginnings
- Buchan, Ursula (18 November 2000). "Gravel allure". The Spectator.
