= A133 road =

Road in England

A133

Major junctions
- From: Colchester
- A12 A120
- To: Clacton-on-Sea

Location
- Country: United Kingdom
- Primary destinations: Elmstead Market; Frating; Great Bentley

Road network
- Roads in the United Kingdom; Motorways; A and B road zones

The A133 road runs between Colchester and Clacton-on-Sea. One end is at Cymbeline Way in Lexden, from where the road runs through the Avenue of Remembrance, bypassing Colchester city centre. It also runs past Wivenhoe Park, through Elmstead Market, Frating Green, meeting a spur from the A120 road at Great Bentley. The road by-passes Weeley, Weeley Heath, Little Clacton, Great Clacton ending in Clacton on Sea.

The A133 joins on from Junction 27 on the A12.

The A133 stretch within Colchester was formerly the A12.

== Route ==
=== Colchester to Frating ===
The western end of the A133 starts at Junction 27 of the A12. The junction is limited access, having no southbound exit or northbound entrance. From Spring Lane Roundabout, the road runs along Cymbeline Way, Colne Bank Avenue, Cowdray Avenue and St. Andrew's Avenue, bypassing Colchester city centre. This section is also known as the Avenue of Remembrance.

From the Greenstead Roundabout, the road is a dual carriageway at Clingoe Hill, with 2 lanes in both directions. The road goes back to a single carriageway at Elmstead Market.

A dual carriageway spur of the A133 runs from the A120 to a roundabout, where it meets the main A133 just outside Frating.

=== Frating to Clacton ===
The road is a single carriageway road for the rest of its length, and bypasses the villages of Weeley and Little Clacton before running past Clacton railway station and ending at Marine Parade.

== Sources ==
- Google Maps
- BBC
