= Patrick Barwise =

British academic (born 1946)

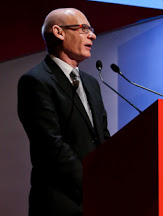
- Barwise in 2014
- Born: 26 June 1946 (age 80); Oxford, England
- Education: London Business School; Lincoln College, Oxford
- Occupation: Academic
- Spouses: Mary Campbell (1973–2002); Catherine Horwood (m.2012)

Patrick Barwise (born June 1946) is emeritus professor of management and marketing at London Business School. He joined the business school in 1976 after an early career at IBM and has published widely on marketing and media.

He is an honorary fellow of the Marketing Society, a patron of the Market Research Society and Chairman of the Archive of Market and Social Research. He was a visiting fellow at the Reuters Institute for the Study of Journalism, Oxford University (2011–2014); chairman of Which?, the consumer organisation (2010–2015); and specialist advisor to House of Lords Select Committee on the Communications Inquiry into the regulation of TV advertising (2010–2011.)

== Early study ==
Barwise received a BA in Engineering Science with Economics from Lincoln College, Oxford in 1968 (he went on to receive an MA in 1973). While working for IBM as a systems engineer, he maintained his study, and in 1973, he received a master's degree in Business Studies, from London Business School (LBS). In 1985, he obtained a PhD on Mass Attitudes and Routine Choice Behaviour, from London University.

== Career ==
=== London Business School ===
Barwise joined London Business School in 1976. He has published on a wide range of topics in management, marketing and media. From 1976 to 2006, he taught MBA and executive courses on marketing management, competitive positioning/strategy, strategic investment decisions, and 'Making Things Happen' (middle management and innovation). Barwise has also held many management posts at LBS including faculty dean, chairman of the marketing faculty, director of alumni affairs, chief examiner and senate representative.

==== Research ====
Most of Barwise’s research at LBS consists of applied empirical studies, typically conducted within practical management or policy contexts. His work has addressed topics such as customer focus and innovation, marketing leadership, consumer and audience behaviour, and broadcasting policy.

==== PhD supervision ====
- Anita Elberse (2002) Now a chaired professor at Harvard Business School: Sequential Product Release in International Markets.
- Seán Meehan (1997) Now a chaired professor at IMD, Lausanne: Market Orientation (winner of the Marketing Science Institute's Alden G Clayton award for dissertation proposal).
- Laura Cousins (1985) Now a consultant and lecturer: Marketing Planning in Theory and Practice.

=== Other activities ===
Barwise was the chairman of Which? from 2010 to 2015, where he chaired the council of trustees and sat on the board (commercial activities), the remuneration committee and the investment committee. He has sat on ad hoc advisory panels for many non-profit organisations such as Ethisphere, Channel 4, Market Research Society, Mencap and DCMS. He speaks at, and chairs events on, broadcasting/media policy, customer focus and innovation, digital inclusion, and various aspects of marketing. He carries out applied research and consulting for broadcasters and related companies, regulators and central government (Independent Review of the BBC's Digital TV Services, 2004; Evaluation of the Capability Reviews Programme, 2007; The Impact of the Commercial World on Children's Wellbeing, 2009; Incorporating Social Value into Spectrum Allocation Decisions, 2015) He is also an experienced expert witness in commercial, competition and tax cases.

== Published works ==
Barwise has published more than 100 research papers and books. Much of his research can be found here.

His latest book is The War Against the BBC

Previous published works include

- The 12 Powers of a Marketing Leader
- The Economics of Television in a Digital World
- Beyond the Familiar: Long-Term Growth through Customer Focus and Innovation
- Simply Better: Winning and Keeping Customers by Delivering What Matters Most. Winner of the 2005 American Marketing Association book prize.
- Television and its Audience
- Must Finance and Strategy Clash?
