= Gardening Women =

2010 book by Catherine Horwood

Gardening Women: Their Stories From 1600 to the Present
- Hardback UK edition (2010)
- Author: Catherine Horwood
- Language: English
- Subject: History; Horticulture
- Publisher: Virago
- Publication date: 2010
- Publication place: United Kingdom
- Media type: Print (hardcover, paperback) and Kindle
- Pages: 448 (original hardback)
- ISBN: 978-1844084630

Gardening Women: Their Stories From 1600 to the Present is a 2010 book on social history and horticulture and women's historical role in gardening and garden design by author and journalist Catherine Horwood. It was first published in hardback by the British publisher Little Brown under their imprint Virago.

== Editions ==
Gardening Women was published in hardback, paperback and Kindle editions.

=== American edition ===
The American edition was published under the title Women and Their Gardens: A History from the Elizabethan Era to Today by the Chicago Review Press in 2012.
