= Potted History =

2007 book about the history of houseplants

Potted History: The Story of Plants in the Home
- Hardback edition (2007)
- Author: Catherine Horwood
- Language: English
- Subject: History; Horticulture
- Publisher: Frances Lincoln Publishers
- Publication date: 2007
- Publication place: United Kingdom
- Media type: Print (hardcover
- Pages: 288 (original hardback)
- ISBN: 978-0711228009

Potted History: The Story of Plants in the Home is a 2007 book on the social history and horticulture of houseplants by the social and cultural historian Catherine Horwood. It was first published in hardback by the British publisher Frances Lincoln Publishers.

Potted History: The Story of Plants in the Home was first published in the UK in an illustrated, hardback edition.

== Summary ==
Rather than focusing on the more usual subject matter of how to look after and rear houseplants, Horwood instead traces the historical and sociological reasons why houseplants came to be found in our homes. She writes how potted plants and domestic horticulture are as subject to fashion as pieces of furniture, from the Victorian's use of the aspidistra in their front parlour to the contemporary of the orchid in the designer loft. The book also covers the influence of indoor horticulture on period design, finding that Wedgwood created a market for special bulb pots and that some of Terence Conran's early designs were for houseplant containers.
