= Weeley Heath =

Hamlet in Essex, England

Coordinates: 51.843°N 1.128°E

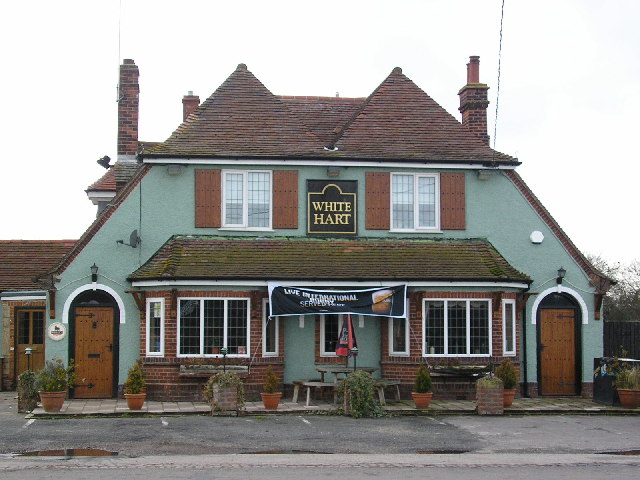
- White Hart

- Location within Essex
- Area: 0.537 km^{2} (0.207 sq mi)
- Population: 719 (2018 estimate)
  - Density: 1,339/km^{2} (3,470/sq mi)
- Civil parish: Weeley
- District: Tendring
- Shire county: Essex
- Region: East
- Country: England
- Sovereign state: United Kingdom
- Police: Essex
- Fire: Essex
- Ambulance: East of England

Weeley Heath is a hamlet on the B1441 and B1414 roads, in the civil parish of Weeley, in the Tendring district, in the county of Essex, England. Nearby settlements include the villages of Weeley and Little Clacton. In 2018 it had an estimated population of 719.

== Amenities ==
Weeley Heath has a fire station and a place of worship.

== Other features ==
There is also Weeleyhall Wood Nature Reserve in the village.
