= Beth Chatto Gardens =

Gardens near Colchester, Essex

Coordinates: 51.875071°N 1.004511°E

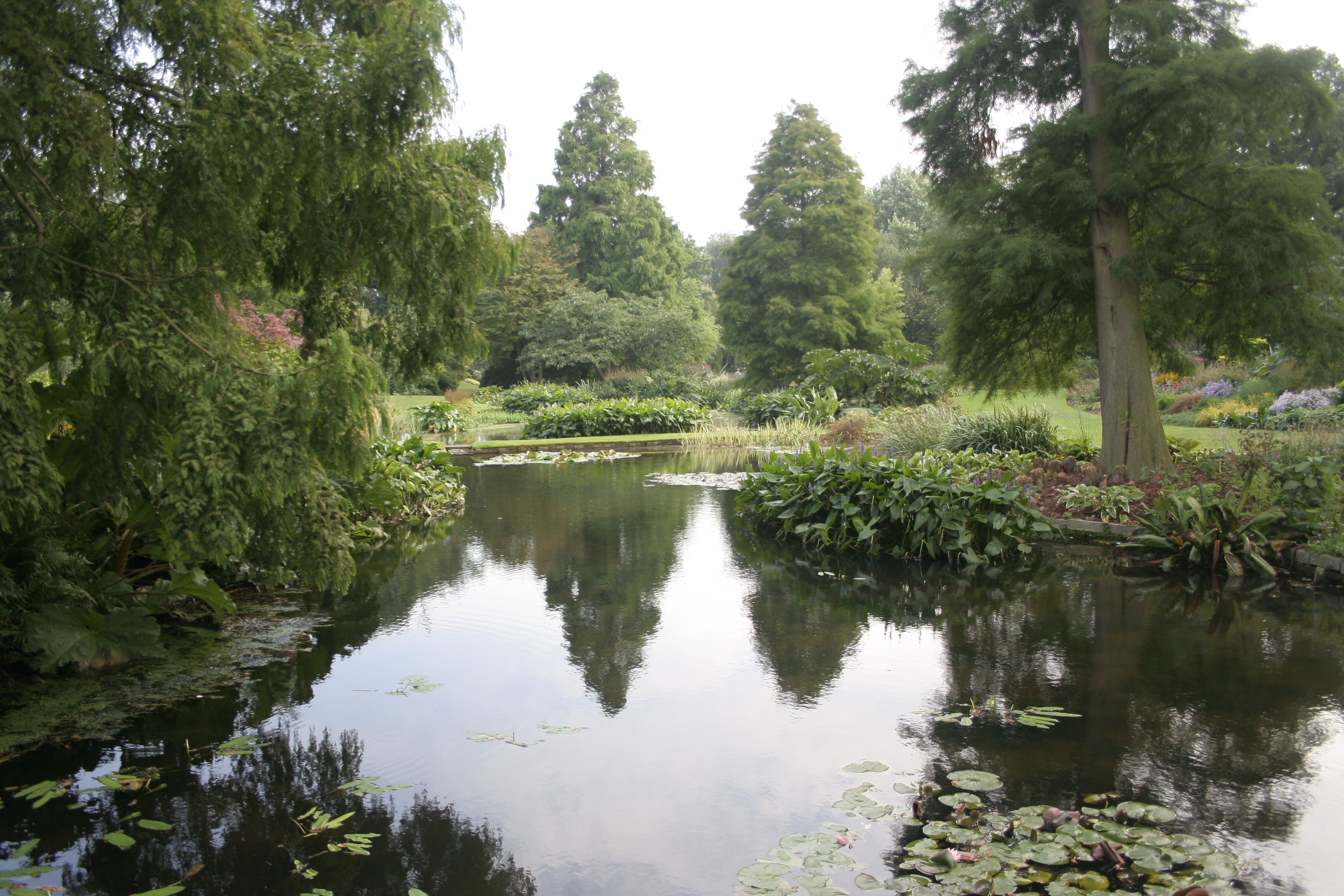
The Water Garden

The Beth Chatto Gardens are an informal collection of historically significant gardens in Essex, England, with National Heritage Grade II listing. The ecological gardens were created by plantswoman Beth Chatto in 1960 from the gravel soil and bogs of the disused fruit farm belonging to her husband, botanist Andrew Chatto. They are a series of gardens that display examples of sustainable planting based on Beth Chatto's ethos of 'right plant, right place'. The gardens are located at White Barn House in the village of Elmstead Market, 6 miles (9.7 km) east of Colchester.

== Plant nursery ==
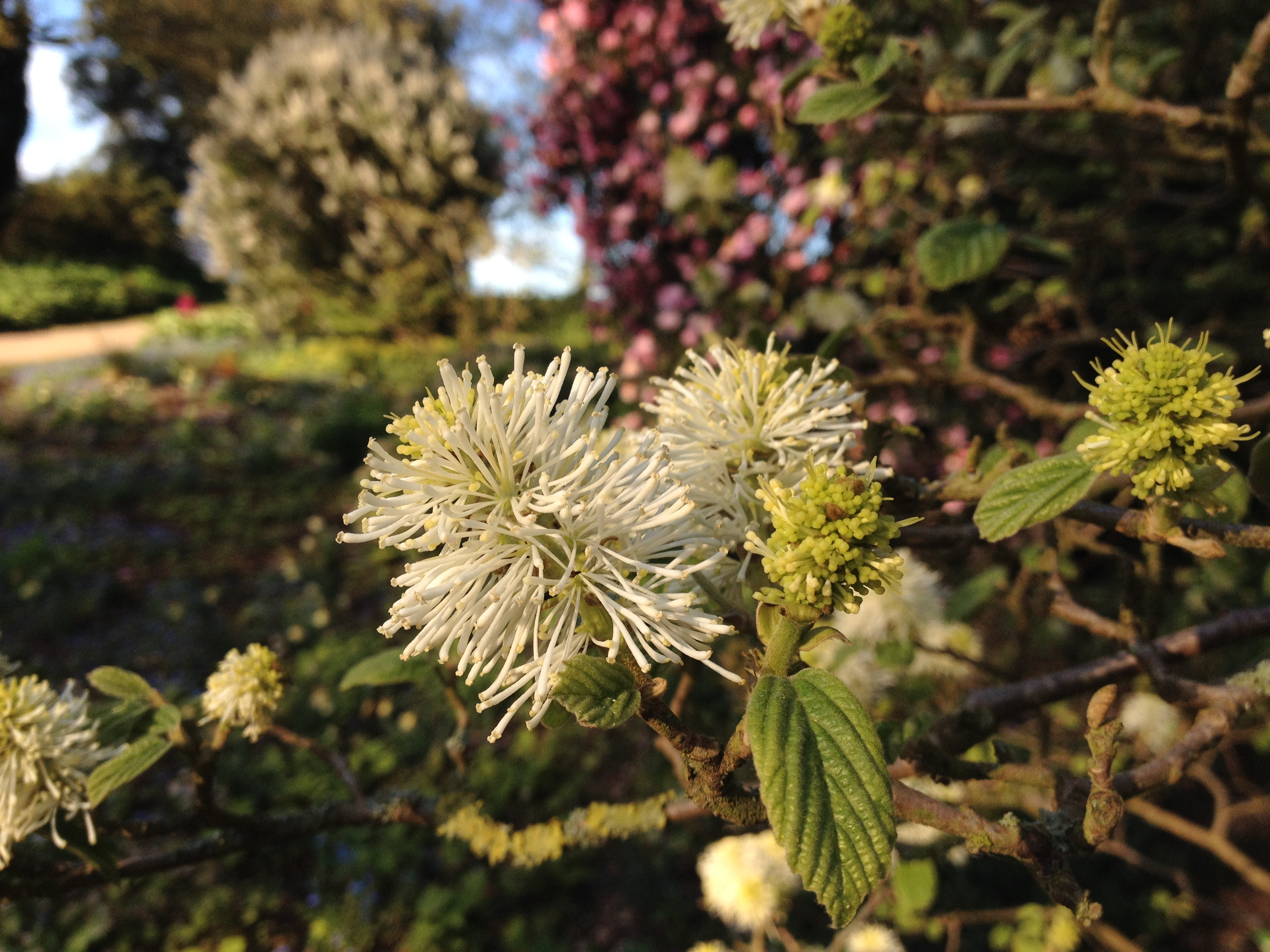
Fothergilla gardenii - flowers and foliage

The plant nursery on the Chatto land is run by Beth Chatto's propagation team and produces around 100,000 plants each year, most propagated from plants Chatto collected, and grown on site in peat-free compost. Plants are sold online and sent out all over the UK under the "Beth Chatto's Plants & Gardens" brand.

== Open to the public ==
Beth Chatto's Plants & Gardens is a family business, run by Beth Chatto's granddaughter Julia Boulton. The gardens and are open to the public seasonally. They cover around 7 acres (2.8 ha) and include a visitor information centre, tearoom, giftshop, and plant nursery. Chatto lived in the white house that remains overlooking the Water Garden. She was often seen about the gardens until her death in May 2018 at the age of 94. The gardens are managed by director David Ward and head gardener Asa Gregers-Warg.

== Sources ==
- Buchan, Ursula (18 November 2000). "Gravel allure". The Spectator. Archived from the original on 20 February 2008 – via FindArticles.
- Clayton, Phil, and Hepworth, Neil. "Beth Chatto Gardens" in The Garden. RHS, September 2015, pp. 46–52
- Stocken, Nicola. "By way of an introduction" in The Garden. RHS, September 2015, pp. 54–55
