= Elmstead Market =

Village in Essex, England

Coordinates: 51°52′48″N 0°59′40″E

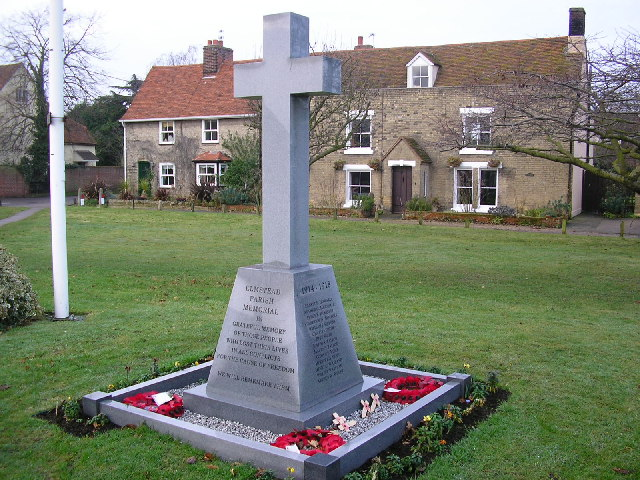
- The war memorial

- Location within Essex
- Area: 0.510 km^{2} (0.197 sq mi)
- Population: 1,684 (2018 estimate)
  - Density: 3,302/km^{2} (8,550/sq mi)
- OS grid reference: TM062244
- Civil parish: Elmstead
- District: Tendring
- Shire county: Essex
- Region: East
- Country: England
- Sovereign state: United Kingdom
- Post town: COLCHESTER
- Postcode district: CO7
- Dialling code: 01206
- Police: Essex
- Fire: Essex
- Ambulance: East of England
- UK Parliament: Harwich and North Essex

Elmstead Market is a village in the civil parish of Elmstead, in the Tendring district of Essex, England. It lies 2 1/4 miles (3.6 km) north-east of Wivenhoe and 4 1/4 miles (6.8 km) east of Colchester. It is on the A133 road which runs to Clacton-on-Sea to the south-east and Colchester to the west. In 2018 it had an estimated population of 1,684.

== Churches ==
The Church of England parish church is dedicated to Saint Anne.

== Transport ==
There are buses between Colchester and Clacton. The nearest train station is Alresford station, 2 miles (3.2 km) away.

== Schools ==
The village had two schools, Elmstead Primary School and Nursery and Market Field School, the latter for students with moderate learning difficulties.

== Woodland Trust Wood ==
The Woodland Trust acquired 103.93 acres (42.06 ha) of land west of the village, where thousands of trees have been planted.

== Notable residents ==
- Beth Chatto (1923–2018), garden designer and author: the Beth Chatto Gardens are located in the village.
- James Noah Paxman (1831–1922), founder of the engineering works Davey Paxman & Co.
- Albert Marshall (1897–2005), centenarian and World War I veteran.
