= Braiswick =

Village in Essex, England

Coordinates: 51.89°N 00.87°E

- Location within Essex
- OS grid reference: TL9826
- Shire county: Essex
- Region: East
- Country: England
- Sovereign state: United Kingdom
- Police: Essex
- Fire: Essex
- Ambulance: East of England

Braiswick, also referred to as New Braiswick Park is a village in Essex, England, 2 km northwest of Colchester. Development of Braiswick begun in 2007 and was eventually completed in 2011.

== History ==
In the late 13th century, Braiswick and surrounding settlements were often referred to as Myland. In the middle-ages, settlements seemed to have been scattered over the un-wooded areas of the region including Tubswick, recorded from 1295, and Braiswick seems to have originated as a medieval freehold.
