= North East Essex =

- Proposed unitary authority area
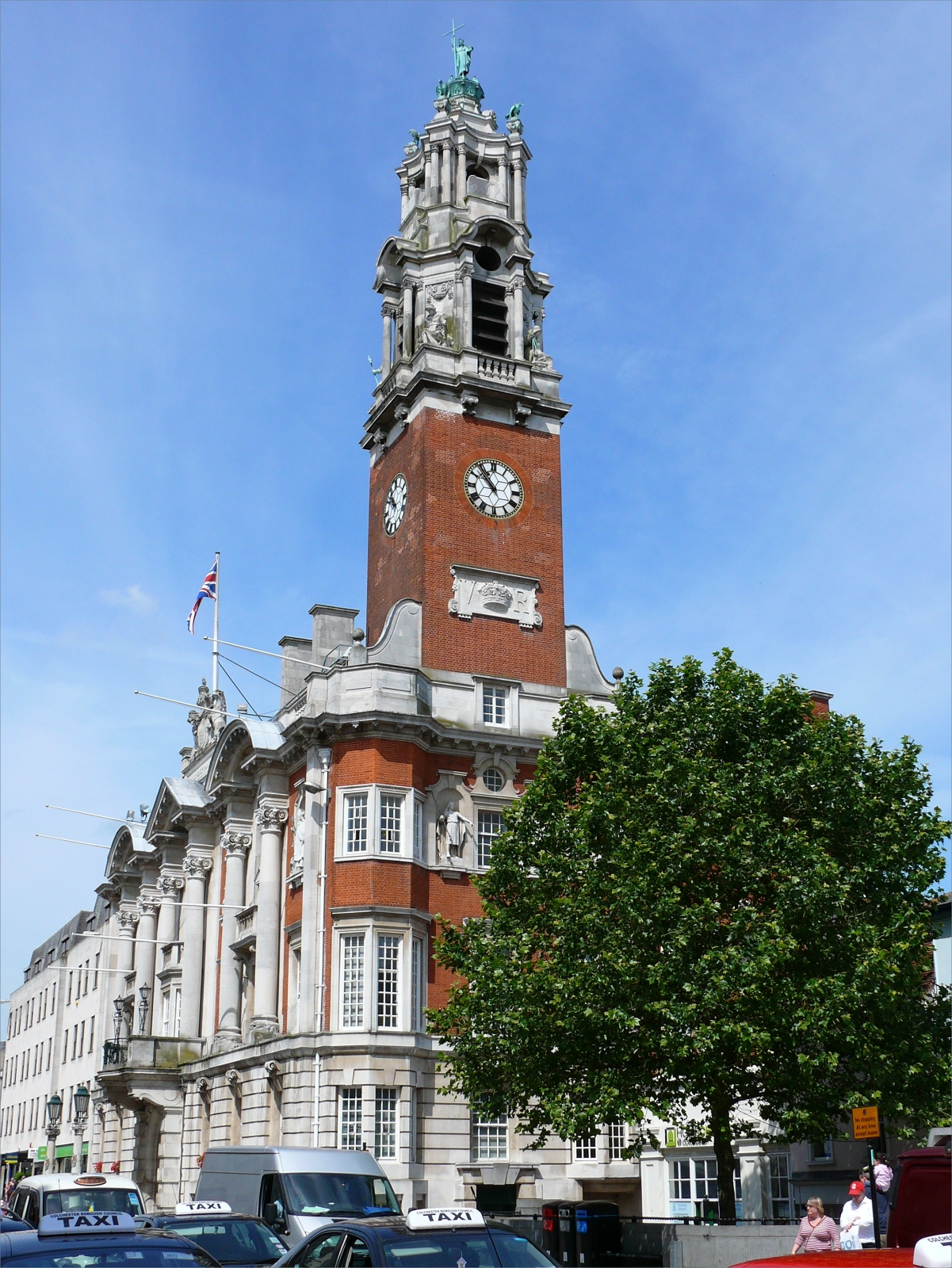
- Colchester

- North East Essex shown within Essex
- Interactive map of North East Essex
- Coordinates: 51.888°N 0.907°E
- Sovereign state: United Kingdom
- Country: England
- Region: East
- Ceremonial county: Essex

Government
  - Type: Unitary authority
  - Body: North East Essex Council

Area
  - Total: 492.77 sq mi (1,276.26 km^{2})

Population (2024 estimate)
  - Total: 521,285
  - Density: 1,057.87/sq mi (408.447/km^{2})
- Time zone: UTC+0 (GMT)
  - Summer (DST): UTC+1 (BST)

North East Essex was a proposed unitary authority area in Essex, England. As part of an ongoing local government reorganisation, it was intended to be formed from the existing districts of Braintree, Colchester and Tendring. The first councillors to North East Essex Council would have been elected in May 2027. The largest settlement in the district would have been the city of Colchester. Plans to create it were withdrawn in September 2026.

== History ==
In February 2025, Essex was accepted into the Devolution Priority Programme. Tied to this, councils were invited to submit proposals for the reorganisation of local government districts by September 2025. The government held statutory consultations from November 2025 to January 2026 and made a decision in March 2026. In North East Essex, it was decided to create a new unitary authority district by combining Braintree, Colchester and Tendring.

In September 2026, the Essex proposals were withdrawn by the government in light of new legal advice. In September 2026, the Essex proposals were withdrawn by the government in light of new legal advice. The decision was threatened with judicial review by Essex County Council.

== Geography ==
The largest settlement in the district would have been Colchester. The Office for National Statistics mid-2023 population estimate of the proposed district was 510,162.

=== Parishes and settlements ===
There are unparished areas in Braintree and Bocking, Colchester and Clacton but there are plans to form three parishes in Clacton unparished area. The government suggested the use of charter trustees to maintain Colchester's city status.

The remainder is covered by 116 civil parishes:

- Abberton, Aldham, Alphamstone, Alresford, Ardleigh, Ashen
- Beaumont-cum-Moze, Belchamp Otten, Belchamp St Paul, Belchamp Walter, Birch, Birdbrook, Black Notley, Borley, Boxted, Bradfield, Bradwell, Brightlingsea, Bulmer, Bures Hamlet
- Castle Hedingham, Chappel, Coggeshall, Colne Engaine, Copford, Cressing
- Dedham
- Earls Colne, East Donyland, East Mersea, Eight Ash Green, Elmstead
- Fairstead, Faulkbourne, Feering, Finchingfield, Fingringhoe, Fordham, Foxearth, Frating, Frinton and Walton
- Gestingthorpe, Gosfield, Great and Little Wigborough, Great Bardfield, Great Bentley, Great Bromley, Great Henny, Great Horkesley, Great Maplestead, Great Notley, Great Oakley, Great Tey, Great Yeldham, Greenstead Green and Halstead Rural
- Halstead, Harwich, Hatfield Peverel, Helions Bumpstead
- Kelvedon
- Lamarsh, Langenhoe, Langham, Lawford, Layer Breton, Layer Marney, Layer-de-la-Haye, Liston, Little Bentley, Little Bromley, Little Clacton, Little Henny, Little Horkesley, Little Maplestead, Little Oakley, Little Yeldham
- Manningtree, Marks Tey, Messing-cum-Inworth, Middleton, Mistley, Mount Bures, Myland
- Ovington
- Panfield, Pebmarsh, Peldon, Pentlow
- Ramsey and Parkeston, Rayne, Ridgewell, Rivenhall
- Salcott, Shalford, Sible Hedingham, Silver End, St Osyth, Stambourne, Stanway, Steeple Bumpstead, Stisted, Sturmer
- Tendring, Terling, The Salings, Thorpe-le-Soken, Thorrington, Tilbury Juxta Clare, Tiptree, Toppesfield, Twinstead
- Virley
- Wakes Colne, Weeley, West Bergholt, West Mersea, Wethersfield, White Colne, White Notley, Wickham St. Paul, Witham, Wivenhoe, Wix, Wormingford, Wrabness

== Governance ==
The local authority would have been North East Essex Council. The first councillors would have been elected in May 2027. This election was cancelled in May 2026.
