= Lexden and Winstree Rural District =

Former rural district in Essex, England

Coordinates: 51.889°N 0.846°E

Lexden and Winstree
- Rural district
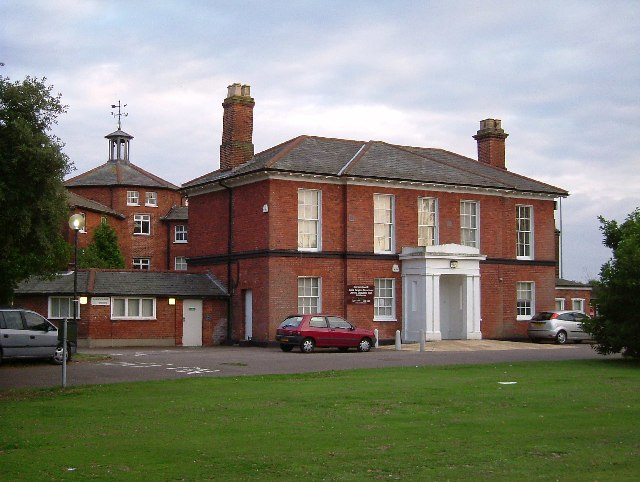
- Former Lexden and Winstree Union Workhouse, London Road, Stanway
- Area
  - 1971: 26,929 hectares (66,543 acres)
- Population
  - 1901: 18,586
  - 1971: 32,161
- History
  - Created: 28 December 1894
  - Abolished: 31 March 1974
  - Succeeded by: Colchester
- Status: Rural district

Lexden and Winstree Rural District was a rural district in Essex, England, from 1894 to 1974, covering an area in the north-east of the county which almost surrounded Colchester. It was abolished in 1974 when its area was absorbed into a much enlarged borough of Colchester.

== History ==
The district had its origins in the Lexden and Winstree Poor Law Union, which had been created in 1836 for a group of parishes to collectively deliver their responsibilities under the poor laws. Such unions were created under the Poor Law Amendment Act 1834, and often comprised both a town and the surrounding rural parishes. However, in this area the sixteen parishes which made up the ancient borough of Colchester were already grouped for poor law purposes under a private act of parliament of 1698. The rural parishes surrounding Colchester therefore formed a separate union, which was named Lexden and Winstree after two of the historic Hundreds of Essex. Despite the name, the union did not include Lexden itself, which was one of the parishes within the borough of Colchester. A workhouse was built in 1836 to serve the union on London Road in Stanway, to the west of Colchester.

In 1872, sanitary districts were established. In rural areas, public health and local government responsibilities were given to the existing boards of guardians of poor law unions. Rural sanitary districts were reconstituted as rural districts with their own elected councils with effect from 28 December 1894, under the Local Government Act 1894. The link with the poor law union continued in that all the rural district councillors were thereafter ex officio members of the board of guardians. Lexden and Winstree Rural District Council held its first official meeting on 2 January 1895 at the workhouse. Hamilton Ashwin, a clergyman from Dedham who was already the chairman of the board of guardians, was elected as the first chairman of the rural district council.

The parish of Wivenhoe was removed from the rural district in 1898 when it was made its own urban district, as was West Mersea in 1926.

In its early years, the rural district council met at the workhouse at Stanway, and its staff were based at various locations in Colchester. By 1965 the council had established its main offices at a large converted house built in 1904 called Lexden Grange at 127 Lexden Road in Colchester, which was outside the council's own administrative area.

The rural district was abolished in 1974. The area was merged with the old borough of Colchester and the urban districts of West Mersea and Wivenhoe to became a new non-metropolitan district and borough called Colchester.

== Parishes ==
The civil parishes in Lexden and Winstree Rural District were:

- Abberton
- Aldham
- Birch
- Boxted
- Chappel
- Copford
- Dedham
- East Donyland
- East Mersea
- Easthorpe (abolished 1949)
- Eight Ash Green (created 1949)
- Fingringhoe
- Fordham
- Great and Little Wigborough (created 1953)
- Great Wigborough (abolished 1953)
- Great Horkesley
- Great Tey
- Inworth (abolished 1934)
- Langenhoe
- Langham
- Layer Breton
- Layer-de-la-Haye
- Layer Marney
- Little Horkesley
- Little Wigborough (abolished 1953)
- Marks Tey
- Messing (abolished de facto 1934, de jure 1946)
- Messing-cum-Inworth (created 1934)
- Mount Bures
- Peldon
- Salcott
- Stanway
- Tiptree (created 1934)
- Virley
- Wakes Colne
- West Bergholt
- West Mersea (until 1926)
- Wivenhoe (until 1898)
- Wormingford
