= Hundreds of Essex =

Historical divisions of Essex, England

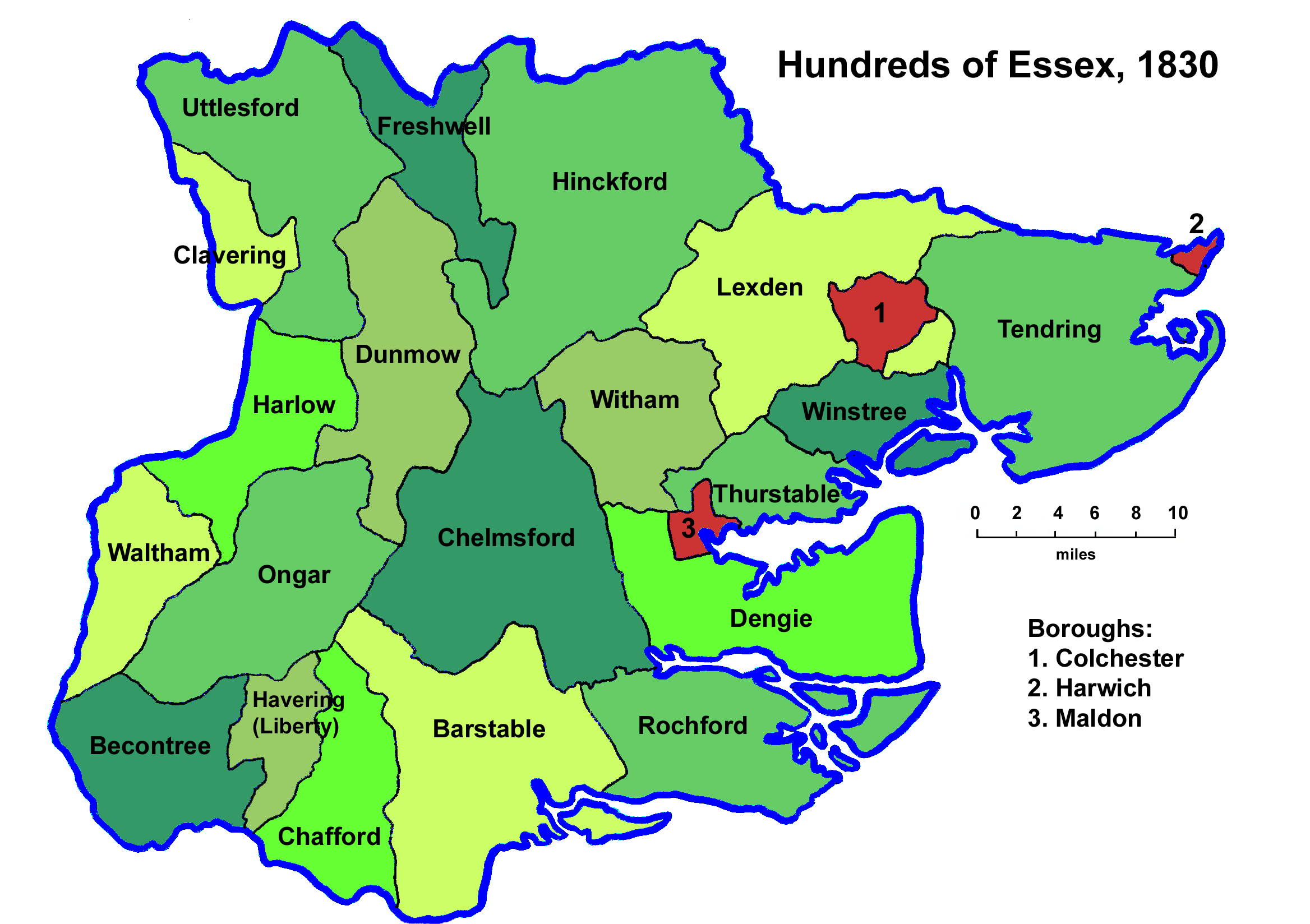
The Hundreds of Essex in 1830

Between Anglo-Saxon times and the nineteenth century the English county of Essex was divided for administrative purposes into 19 hundreds, plus the Liberty of Havering-atte-Bower and the boroughs of Colchester, Harwich, and Maldon. Each hundred had a separate council that met each month to rule on local judicial and taxation matters.

Essex probably originated as a shire in the time of Æthelstan. The Domesday Survey listed nineteen hundreds, corresponding very closely in extent and in name with those that were in use until early in the twentieth century. The additional half-hundred of Thunreslan on the border with Suffolk no longer exists, and the hundred of Witbrictesherna was renamed Dengie. The liberty of Havering-atte-Bower was formed from land taken from Becontree hundred. In the time of Edward I, Clavering and Freshwell were each considered half-hundreds in Essex.

== Parishes ==
At the start of the 19th century, the hundreds contained the following parishes:

| Hundred | Area (acres) |
Parishes
| Barstable | 71,373 |
Basildon, Bowers Gifford, Bulphan, Chadwell, Corringham, Doddinghurst, Downham, Dunton, East Horndon, East Tilbury, Fobbing, Great Burstead, Horndon-on-the-Hill, Hutton, Ingrave, Laindon, Langdon Hills, Lee Chapel, Little Burstead, Little Thurrock, Mucking, Nevendon, North Benfleet, Orsett, Pitsea, Ramsden Bellhouse, Ramsden Crays, Shenfield, South Benfleet, Stanford-le-Hope, Thundersley, Vange, West Horndon, West Tilbury, Wickford
| Becontree | 37,705 |
Barking, Dagenham, East Ham, Ilford, Leyton, Little Ilford, Walthamstow, Wanstead, West Ham, Woodford
| Chafford | 34,703 |
Aveley, Brentwood, Childerditch, Cranham, Grays Thurrock, Great Warley, Little Warley, North Ockendon, Rainham, South Ockendon, South Weald, Stifford, Upminster, Wennington, West Thurrock
| Chelmsford | 85,536 |
Great Baddow, Little Baddow, Bicknacre, Blackmore, Boreham, Broomfield, Buttsbury, Chelmsford, Chignal St James, Chignal Smealy, Danbury, Fryerning, East Hanningfield, West Hanningfield, South Hanningfield, Ingatestone, Great Leighs, Little Leighs, Margaretting, Mountnessing, Rettendon, Roxwell, Runwell, Sandon, Springfield, Stock, Great Waltham, Little Waltham, Widford, Woodham Ferrers (Ferris), Writtle
| Clavering | 19,987 |
Berden, Clavering, Farnham, Langley, Manuden, Ugley
| Dengie | 58,542 |
Althorne, Asheldham, Bradwell-on-Sea, Burnham, Cold Norton, Creeksea, Dengie, Hazeleigh, Latchingdon, St Lawrence, Mayland, Mundon, North Fambridge, Purleigh, Southminster, Steeple, Stow Maries, Tillingham, Woodham Mortimer, Woodham Walter
| Dunmow | 52,171 |
Barnston, Broxted, Great Canfield, Little Canfield, Chickney, Great Dunmow, Little Dunmow, Good Easter, High Easter, Great Easton, Little Easton, Lindsell, Mashbury, Pleshey, Aythorpe Roding, Berners Roding, High Roding, Leaden Roding, Margaret Roding, White Roding, Shellow Bowels, Thaxted, Tilty, Willingale Doe, Willingale Spain
| Freshwell | 28,728 |
Ashdon, Great Bardfield, Little Bardfield, Bardfield Saling, Helions Bumpstead, Hadstock, Hempstead, Radwinter, Great Sampford, Little Sampford
| Harlow | 30,193 |
Great Hallingbury, Little Hallingbury, Harlow, Hatfield Broad Oak, Latton, Matching, Netteswell, Great Parndon, Little Parndon, Sheering
| Havering (liberty) | 12,550 |
Havering-atte-Bower, Hornchurch, Romford
| Hinckford | 110,566 |
Alphamstone, Ashen, Belchamp Otten, Belchamp St Paul, Belchamp Walter, Birdbrook, Bocking, Borley, Braintree, Bulmer, Steeple Bumpstead, Bures, Felsted, Finchingfield, Foxearth, Gestingthorpe, Gosfield, Halstead, Great Henny, Little Henny, Haverhill, Castle Hedingham, Sible Hedingham, Lamarsh, Liston, Great Maplestead, Little Maplestead, Middleton, Ovington, Panfield, Pebmarsh, Pentlow, Rayne, Ridgewell, Great Saling, Shalford, Stambourne, Stebbing, Stisted, Sturmer, Tilbury Juxta Clare, Toppesfield, Twinstead, Wethersfield, Wickham St Paul, Great Yeldham, Little Yeldham
| Lexden | 62,476 |
West Bergholt, Great Birch, Boxted, Dedham, East Donyland, Easthorpe, Fordham, Great Horkesley, Little Horkesley, Langham, Mount Bures, Stanway, Wivenhoe, Wormingford, Aldham, Chappel, Great Coggeshall, Earls Colne, Colne Engaine, Wakes Colne, White Colne, Copford, Feering, Inworth, Markshall, Messing, Pattiswick, Great Tey, Little Tey, Marks Tey
| Ongar | 56,994 |
Abbess Roding, Beauchamp Roding, Berners Roding, Bobbingworth, Chigwell, Chipping Ongar, Fyfield, Greensted, High Laver, High Ongar, Kelvedon Hatch, Lambourne, Little Laver, Loughton, Magdalen Laver, Moreton, Navestock, North Weald Bassett, Norton Mandeville, Shelley, Stanford Rivers, Stapleford Abbotts, Stapleford Tawney, Stondon Massey, Theydon Bois, Theydon Garnon, Theydon Mount
| Rochford | 58,639 |
Ashingdon, Barling, Canewdon, Eastwood, South Fambridge, Foulness, Hadleigh, Havengore, Hawkwell, Hockley, Leigh, Paglesham, Prittlewell, Rawreth, Rayleigh, Rochford, Shopland, North Shoebury, South Shoebury, Southchurch, Great Stambridge, Little Stambridge, Sutton, Great Wakering, Little Wakering
| Tendring | 83,011 |
Alresford, Ardleigh, Beaumont-cum-Moze, Great Bentley, Little Bentley, Bradfield, Brightlingsea, Great Bromley, Little Bromley, Great Clacton, Little Clacton, Elmstead, Frating, Frinton, Great Holland, Little Holland, Kirby, Lawford, Manningtree, Mistley, Great Oakley, Little Oakley, St Osyth, Ramsey, Tendring, Thorpe-le-Soken, Thorrington, Walton-le-Soken, Weeley, Wix, Wrabness
| Thurstable | 24,776 |
Goldhanger, Heybridge, Langford, Tollesbury, Tolleshunt D'Arcy, Tolleshunt Knights, Tolleshunt Major, Great Totham, Little Totham, Wickham Bishops
| Uttlesford | 48,781 |
Arkesden, Birchanger, Great Chesterford, Little Chesterford, Great Chishill, Little Chishill, Chrishall, Debden, Elmdon, Elsenham, Heydon, Henham, Littlebury, Newport, Quendon, Rickling, Stansted Mountfitchet, Strethall, Takeley, Wenden Lofts, Wendens Ambo, Wicken Bonhunt, Widdington, Wimbish
| Waltham | 23,098 |
Chingford, Epping, Nazeing, Waltham Abbey
| Winstree | 23,685 |
Abberton, Fingringhoe, Langenhoe, Layer Breton, Layer de la Haye, Layer Marney, East Mersea, West Mersea, Peldon, Salcott, Virley, Great Wigborough, Little Wigborough
| Witham | 36,684 |
Bradwell, Great Braxted, Little Braxted, Cressing, Fairstead, Faulkbourne, Little Coggeshall, Hatfield Peverel, Kelvedon, Black Notley, White Notley, Rivenhall, Terling, Ulting, Witham

== See also ==
- History of Essex
- List of hundreds of England and Wales
