= Little Wigborough =

Village in Essex, England

Coordinates: 51°48′N 0°52′E

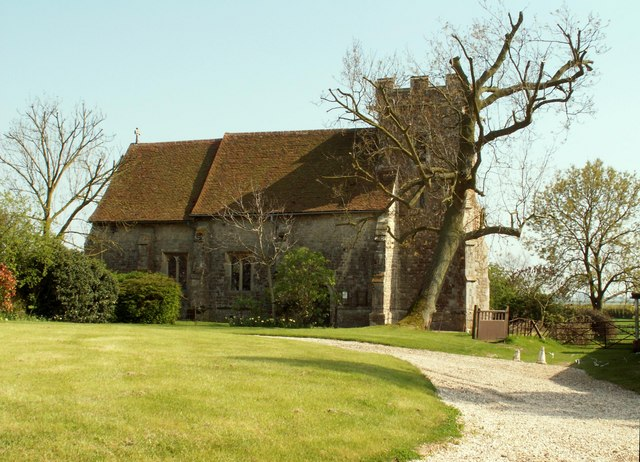
- St Nicholas's church

- Location within Essex
- Civil parish: Great and Little Wigborough
- District: Colchester
- Shire county: Essex
- Region: East
- Country: England
- Sovereign state: United Kingdom
- Police: Essex
- Fire: Essex
- Ambulance: East of England

Little Wigborough is a village in the civil parish of Great and Little Wigborough, in the City of Colchester district of Essex, England. Little Wigborough is located between Peldon and Great Wigborough.

== History ==
The place-name 'Wigborough' is first attested in the Domesday Book of 1086, where it appears as Wicgebergha and Wigheberga. Little Wigborough is first referred to in the Valuation of Norwich of 1254, where it appears as Wigeberwe Parva. The name means 'Wicga's hill or barrow'.

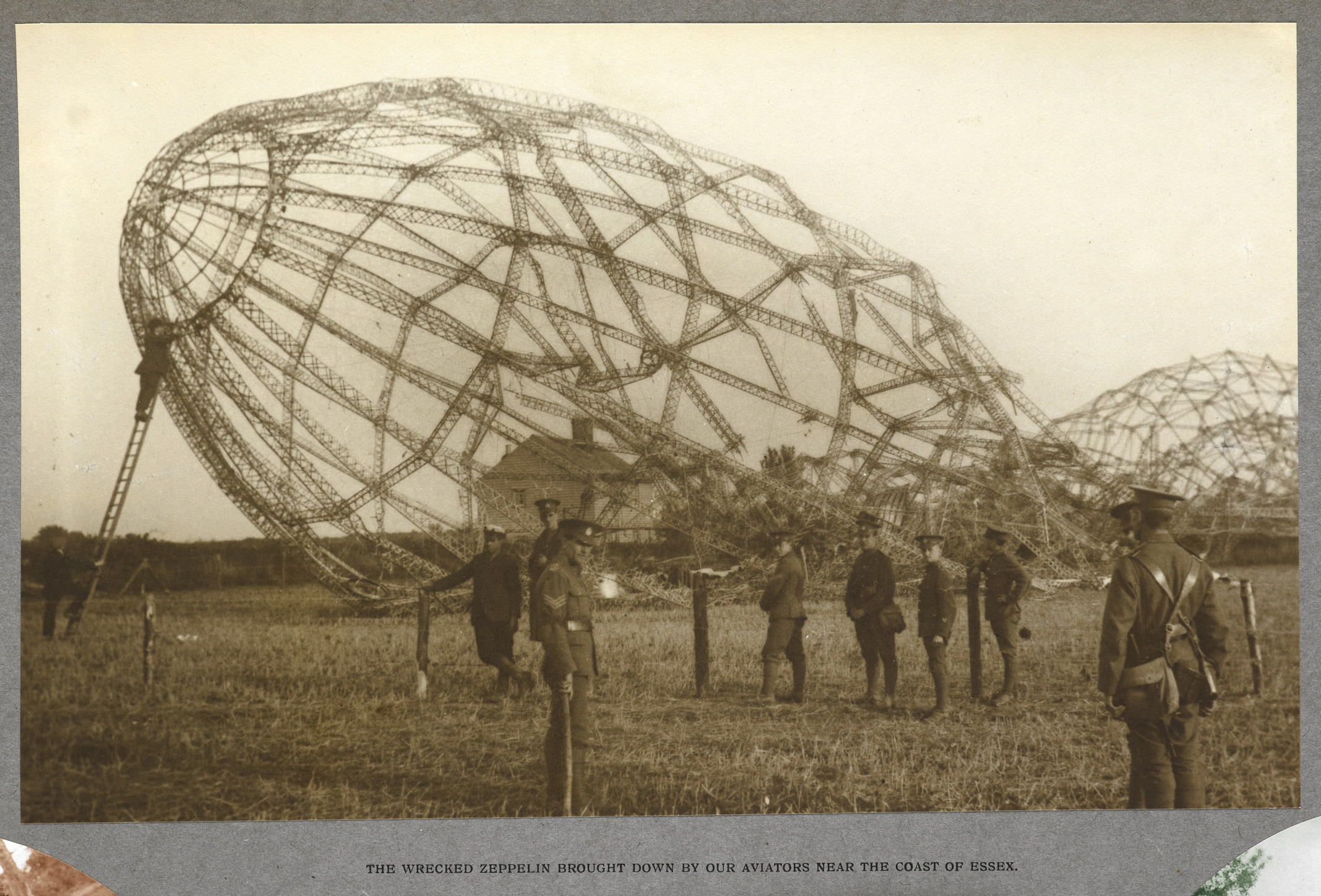
Wreck of Zeppelin L33

In the early hours of 24 September 1916, the German Army Zeppelin L33 was returning from a bombing raid on London, when it hit by an anti-aircraft shell and further damaged by Royal Flying Corps aircraft. It made a forced landing in the village, close to New Hall farm. The crew tried to burn the wreckage but they were only partially successful. They were arrested by the local special constable as they walked away from the scene. A pen drawing with pencil of the Zeppelin by the Scottish artist Adam Bruce Thomson is on display at the Scottish National Portrait Gallery.

Little Wigborough was an ancient parish in the Winstree or Winstred hundred of Essex. As well as the area around the village itself, the parish historically had an exclave to the west which included Maldon Road and streched to Salcott Creek to the south; this exclave was ceded to Great Wigborough in 1889. In 1953 the parish was merged with its neighbour Great Wigborough to form a new civil parish called Great and Little Wigborough. At the 1951 census (the last before the abolition of the civil parish), Little Wigborough had a population of 45.

Great and Little Wigborough now shares a grouped parish council with the neighbouring parishes of Peldon, Salcott and Virley, called the Winstred Hundred Parish Council.

== Church ==
The parish church is dedicated to St Nicholas. It is a Grade II* listed building dating from the 15th century but its list of rectors goes back to 1272.

The building was badly damaged in the 1884 Colchester earthquake but extensive repairs were made. Time has taken its toll however: it is currently closed and is unlikely to reopen without funding. There are cracks inside and out and the extreme weather of recent years has caused subsidence in the south-west buttress and walls. The floor has sunk in some places and raised up in others.

== Geography ==
Copt Hall Marshes is a marshland and National Trust nature reserve to the south of the village.
