= 1950 Colchester Borough Council election =

1950 UK local government election

Elections to Colchester Borough Council took place on 11 May 1950. This was on the same day as other local elections across the United Kingdom.

== Ward results ==
=== Abbey ===
Abbey
| Party | Candidate | Votes | % | ±% |
|---|---|---|---|---|
| Liberal | P. Warwick-Bailey | Unopposed | | |
| Turnout | | N/A | N/A | N/A |
| Liberal win | | | | |

=== Berechurch ===
Berechurch
| Party | Candidate | Votes | % | ±% |
|---|---|---|---|---|
| Labour | S. Head | 1,363 | 55.3 | |
| Conservative | E. Eastwood | 1,100 | 44.7 | |
| Turnout | | | | |
| Labour win | | | | |

=== Castle ===
Castle
| Party | Candidate | Votes | % | ±% |
|---|---|---|---|---|
| Conservative | H. Reid | 1,143 | 56.8 | |
| Labour | N. Green | 868 | 43.2 | |
| Turnout | | | | |
| Conservative win | | | | |

=== Harbour ===
Harbour
| Party | Candidate | Votes | % | ±% |
|---|---|---|---|---|
| Labour | T. Morris | 1,165 | 55.2 | |
| Conservative | B. Richardson | 946 | 44.8 | |
| Turnout | | | | |
| Labour win | | | | |

=== Lexden & Shrub End ===
Lexden & Shrub End
| Party | Candidate | Votes | % | ±% |
|---|---|---|---|---|
| Conservative | A. Craig | 1,380 | 71.3 | |
| Labour | I. Brown | 556 | 28.7 | |
| Turnout | | | | |
| Conservative win | | | | |

=== Mile End ===
Mile End
| Party | Candidate | Votes | % | ±% |
|---|---|---|---|---|
| Conservative | D. Underwood | 1,183 | 51.0 | |
| Labour | L. Worsnop | 1,137 | 49.0 | |
| Turnout | | | | |
| Conservative win | | | | |

=== New Town ===
New Town
| Party | Candidate | Votes | % | ±% |
|---|---|---|---|---|
| Labour | M. Cook | 1,200 | 55.4 | |
| Conservative | A. Worth | 930 | 42.9 | |
| Communist | T. Hawkins | 36 | 1.7 | |
| Turnout | | | | |
| Labour win | | | | |

=== St. John's ===
St. John's
| Party | Candidate | Votes | % | ±% |
|---|---|---|---|---|
| Conservative | R. Howell | 992 | 43.2 | |
| Labour | L. French | 876 | 38.2 | |
| Independent | H. Aldous | 428 | 18.6 | |
| Turnout | | | | |
| Conservative win | | | | |

=== St. Mary's ===
St. Mary's
| Party | Candidate | Votes | % | ±% |
|---|---|---|---|---|
| Conservative | H. Hacknessy | 1,735 | 81.8 | |
| Labour | T. Niblett | 385 | 18.2 | |
| Turnout | | | | |
| Conservative win | | | | |
