= Great Wigborough =

Village in Essex, England

Coordinates: 51.800°N 0.853°E

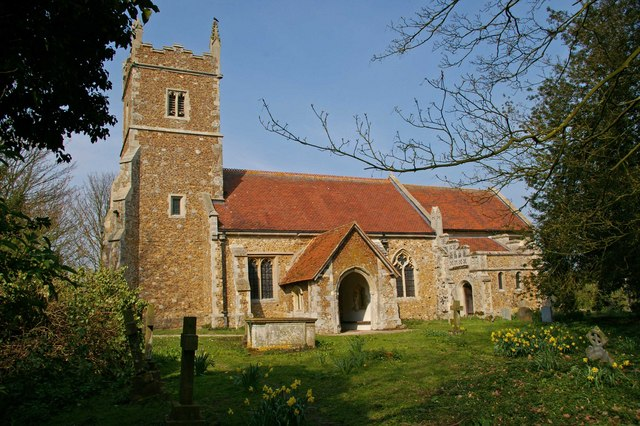
- St Stephen's Church, Great Wigborough

- Location within Essex
- OS grid reference: TL 968 151
- Civil parish: Great and Little Wigborough
- District: Colchester
- Shire county: Essex
- Region: East
- Country: England
- Sovereign state: United Kingdom
- Post town: Colchester
- Postcode district: CO5
- Police: Essex
- Fire: Essex
- Ambulance: East of England
- UK Parliament: Witham

Great Wigborough is a village in the civil parish of Great and Little Wigborough in the City of Colchester district of Essex, England.

The place-name 'Wigborough' first appears in the Domesday Book of 1086, where it appears as Wicgebergha and Wighebergha. The name means 'Wicga's hill or barrow'.

St Stephen's Church dates from the 14th century and is a Grade II* listed building. Heavily damaged in the 1884 Colchester earthquake, it was subsequently extensively restored.

Great Wigborough was an ancient parish in the Winstree or Winstred hundred of Essex. In 1953 the parish was merged with its neighbour Little Wigborough to form a new civil parish called Great and Little Wigborough. At the 1951 census (the last before the abolition of the civil parish), Great Wigborough had a population of 181.

Great and Little Wigborough now shares a grouped parish council with the neighbouring parishes of Peldon, Salcott and Virley, called the Winstred Hundred Parish Council.
