= Smythe's Green =

Village in Essex, England

Coordinates: 51.832°N 0.786°E

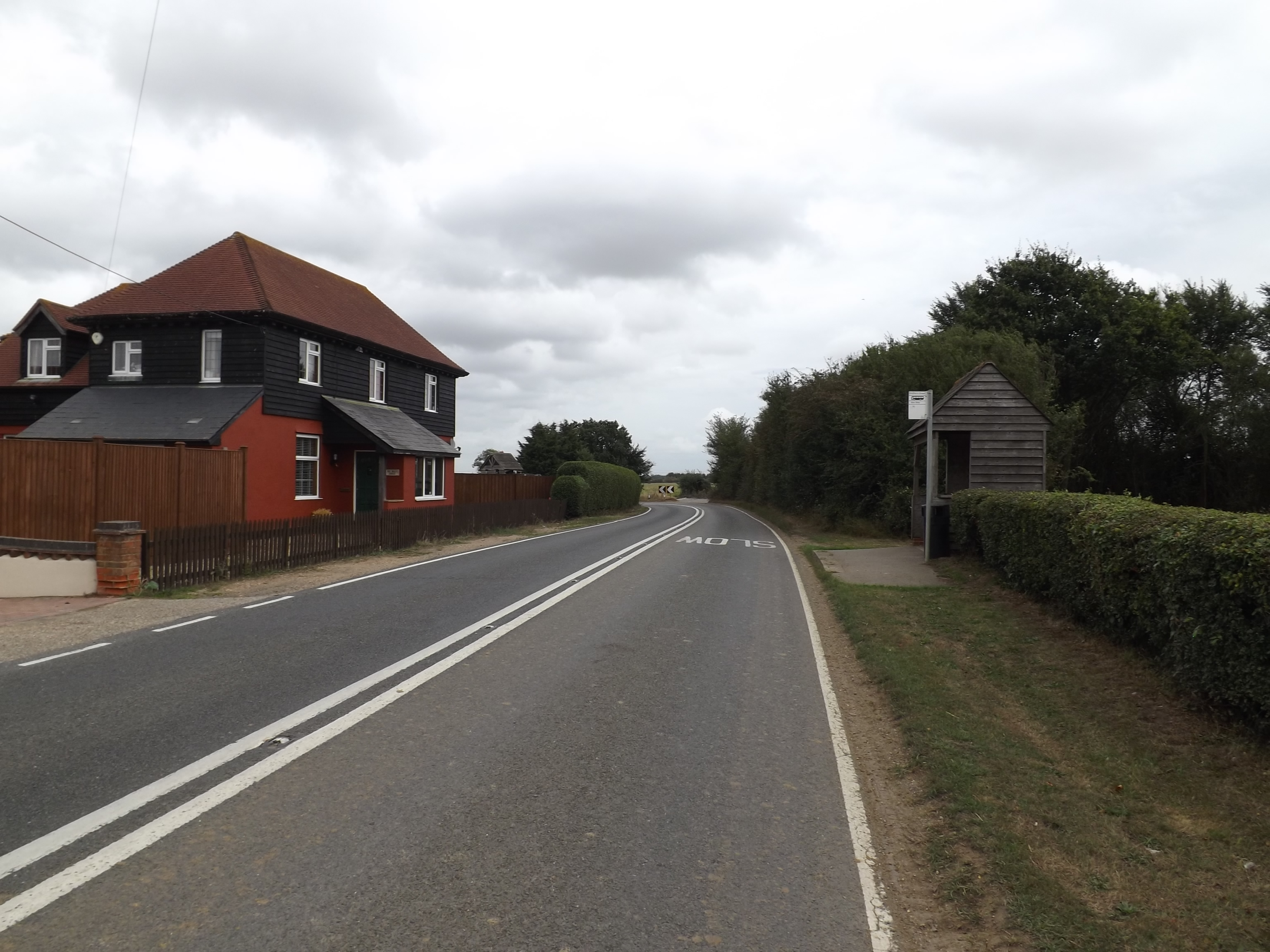
- B1022 Maldon Road, Smythes Green

- Location within Essex
- Civil parish: Layer Marney
- District: Colchester
- Shire county: Essex
- Region: East
- Country: England
- Sovereign state: United Kingdom
- Police: Essex
- Fire: Essex
- Ambulance: East of England

Smythe's Green is a hamlet on the B1022 road, in the civil parish of Layer Marney, in the Colchester district, in the county of Essex, England. It is located in between the villages of Tiptree and Birch.
