= 1951 Colchester Borough Council election =

1951 UK local government election

Elections to Colchester Borough Council took place on 11 May 1951. This was on the same day as other local elections across the United Kingdom.

== Ward results ==
=== Abbey ===
Abbey
| Party | Candidate | Votes | % | ±% |
|---|---|---|---|---|
| Conservative | A. Worth | 965 | 51.3 | N/A |
| Labour | E. Pain | 649 | 34.6 | N/A |
| Liberal | W. Platt | 260 | 13.9 | N/A |
| Turnout | | N/A | N/A | N/A |
| Conservative win | | | | |

=== Berechurch ===
Berechurch
| Party | Candidate | Votes | % | ±% |
|---|---|---|---|---|
| Labour | R. Harding | 1,266 | 50.3 | −5.0 |
| Conservative | C. Murphy | 1,253 | 49.7 | +5.0 |
| Turnout | | | | |
| Labour win | | | | |

=== Castle ===
Castle
| Party | Candidate | Votes | % | ±% |
|---|---|---|---|---|
| Conservative | C. Wheeler | 1,124 | 57.1 | +0.3 |
| Labour | W. Green | 844 | 42.9 | −0.3 |
| Turnout | | | | |
| Conservative win | | | | |

=== Harbour ===
Harbour
| Party | Candidate | Votes | % | ±% |
|---|---|---|---|---|
| Labour | The Mayor | Unopposed | | |
| Turnout | | | | |
| Labour win | | | | |

=== Lexden & Shrub End ===
Lexden & Shrub End
| Party | Candidate | Votes | % | ±% |
|---|---|---|---|---|
| Conservative | J. Hamilton | 1,235 | 56.9 | −14.4 |
| Independent | W. Ham | 937 | 43.1 | N/A |
| Turnout | | | | |
| Conservative win | | | | |

=== Mile End ===
Mile End
| Party | Candidate | Votes | % | ±% |
|---|---|---|---|---|
| Conservative | P. Borges | 1,202 | 56.5 | +5.5 |
| Labour | K. Peartree | 926 | 43.5 | −5.5 |
| Turnout | | | | |
| Conservative win | | | | |

=== New Town ===
New Town
| Party | Candidate | Votes | % | ±% |
|---|---|---|---|---|
| Labour | W. Lee | 1,132 | 53.2 | −2.2 |
| Conservative | A. Worth | 966 | 45.4 | +2.5 |
| Communist | E. Hawkins | 30 | 1.4 | −0.3 |
| Turnout | | | | |
| Labour win | | | | |

=== St. John's ===
St. John's
| Party | Candidate | Votes | % | ±% |
|---|---|---|---|---|
| Conservative | R. Joslin | 1,098 | 51.5 | +8.3 |
| Labour | C. Pell | 1,033 | 38.2 | +10.3 |
| Turnout | | | | |
| Conservative win | | | | |

=== St. Mary's ===
St. Mary's
| Party | Candidate | Votes | % | ±% |
|---|---|---|---|---|
| Conservative | A. Semken | Unopposed | | |
| Turnout | | | | |
| Conservative win | | | | |
