= Pattiswick =

Village in Essex, England

Coordinates: 51°53′N 0°39′E

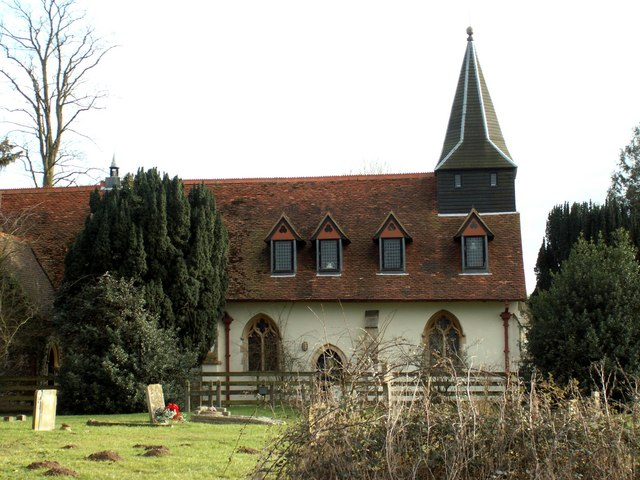
- St Mary's Church, now a private residence

- Location within Essex
- Civil parish: Bradwell
- District: Braintree
- Shire county: Essex
- Region: East
- Country: England
- Sovereign state: United Kingdom

Pattiswick is a village near the A120 road, in the civil parish of Bradwell, in the Braintree district of Essex, England.

== History ==
Pattiswick was historically a chapelry in the ancient parish of Feering in the Lexden hundred of Essex. The chapelry became a separate parish in 1313.

The parish was abolished in 1949. Most of its area, including the small village, was transferred to the parish of Bradwell, but a smaller area went instead to Coggeshall. At the 1931 census (the last before the abolition of the civil parish), Pattiswick had a population of 297.
