= Layer Breton =

Village in Essex, England

Coordinates: 51.830°N 0.821°E

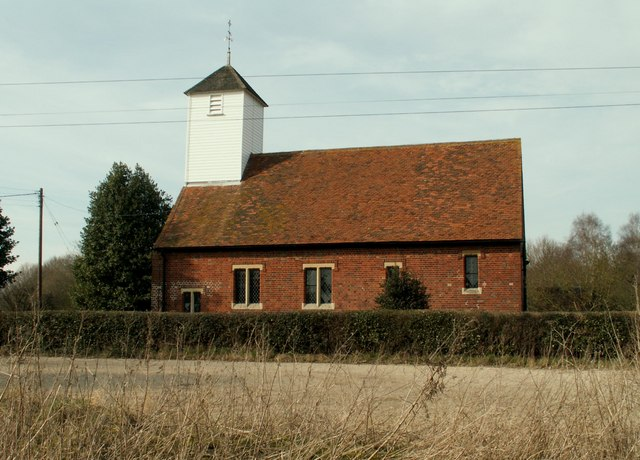
- St Marys Church

- Location within Essex
- Population: 285 (Parish, 2021)
- Civil parish: Layer Breton
- District: Colchester
- Shire county: Essex
- Region: East
- Country: England
- Sovereign state: United Kingdom
- Post town: Colchester
- Postcode district: CO2
- Police: Essex
- Fire: Essex
- Ambulance: East of England
- UK Parliament: Witham

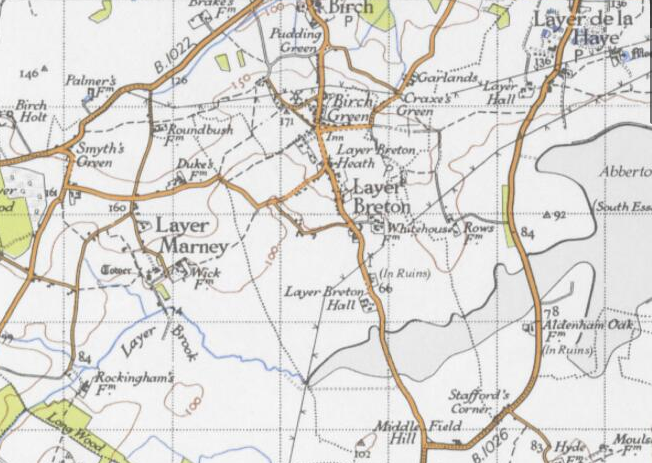
Layer Breton being shown on a 20th-century ordnance survey map.

Layer Breton is a village and civil parish in the Colchester district of Essex, England. At the 2021 census the parish had a population of 285. It is one of three neighbouring parishes called Layer, the others being Layer de la Haye to the west, and Layer Marney to the east. The other neighbouring parishes to Layer Breton are Birch and Great and Little Wigborough. The village has a church dedicated to St Mary the Virgin, rebuilt in brick in 1923 on a new site nearly a mile to the north of the old one. The village was among those which suffered damage from the 1884 Colchester earthquake.

== History ==
In the 1870s, John Marius Wilson's Imperial Gazetteer of England and Wales described Layer Breton as:

"A parish, with a village, in Lexden district, Essex. Post town, Kelvedon. Acres, 954. Real property, £1, 763. Pop., 298. Houses, 62. The property is divided among a few. The living is a rectory in the diocese of Rochester. Value, £350. * Patron, the Rev. W. Blow. The church is tolerable. There are chapels for Independents and Quakers; and the Independent one was rebuilt and enlarged in 1860."

Name

The name Layer Breton originally came from a river name of Celtic origins, 'Leire', most likely to be identical with one found in Leicester. Lewis Brito ('the Breton') gave land here to St. John's Abbey, Colchester in the 12th century.

== Churches ==
St. Mary's Anglican Church stands next to the Heath in the main part of the village. It was built in 1915. The original church stood opposite Layer Breton Hall. It was demolished in 1913 after the destruction following the 1884 Colchester earthquake. "A watercolour painting of the old church, which was painted shortly before the demolition, hangs in the new church. It shows that the old building was of a similar shape and size to the new, having a vestry behind the altar and a wooden porch. It had a wooden bell turret as does the new building. It was of rubble construction with a tiled roof. The modern church is of brick construction with tiles. There was a church on the old site from at least Norman times. The old church probably dated from the 14th century." St Mary The Virgin church is part of a group of seven parishes which belong to the Benefice of Thurstable and Winstree, which came into being on 1 October 2013. The other six parishes in the benefice are Tolleshunt Knights with Tiptree, Great Braxted, Messing, Inworth, Copford and Easthorpe.

== Demographics ==
Population

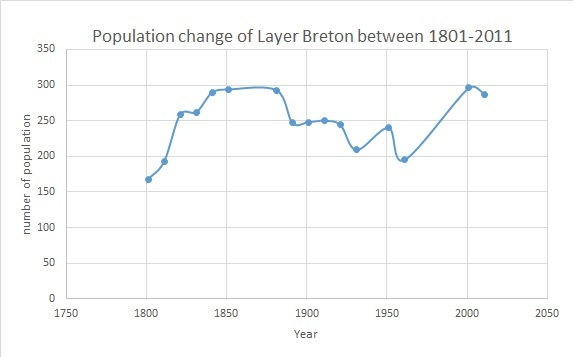
Total population of Layer Breton Civil Parish, Colchester reported by the census of population from 1881 to 2011

The population of Layer Breton over the past two centuries has seen gradual changes. For the first century the population fluctuated between 168 and 247. During 1801 the population was 168, the lowest the population has ever been to date. From this date up until 1881 the population continued to increase the population reached 293 however this would be the highest the population would reach until the 20th century, after this the population began to decrease falling to 247 in 1891 and staying around this number for the next 30 years with small fluctuation in the size of the population ( the population was 248 in 1901, 250 in 1911 and 244 in 1921).The population decreased in 1931 to 209 but the following census (1951) it had increased to 240 but this wasn't to last as the population dropped to 195 in 1961. In 2001 the population of Layer Breton was 296 with 152 males and 144 females. According to the 2011 census there were 144 males and 143 meaning the population was 287 showing little change in the past 10 years.

Occupation of Males and Females in 1881 Layer Breton

Employment

Many of the male workers during 1881 were involved in agricultural activities. This was the most common work sector during this period as many households relied on farm grown products and produce. In contrast many of the women were without specific occupations; however, 20 women were workers and dealers in dress and 11 were involved in domestic service or offices. The 2001 census showed that 49% residents were employed (144 out 296), this includes part-time workers, full-time workers and self-employed workers. However the 2011 census 66% of the population aged 16–74 were in some form of employment. The 2011 census data set also shows which employment sectors the people of Layer Breton are currently employed in the three most popular industries people are involved in are the manufacturing (11.5%), Education (11.5%) and Wholesale and Retail Trade; Repair of Motor Vehicles and Motor Cycles (10.8%)

Ethnicity

Information published by the 2011 census shows that the largest ethnic group in Layer Breton is White British. The census report shows that 96% (275 out of 287) of the total population are of this the ethnicity. the other 4% of the population are from Mixed/Multiple Ethnic Groups; White and Asian. When comparing the 2001 data to the 2011 the data is the same. Showing that the ethnic structure of Layer Breton has not changed over the 10 years.

Age structure

Information that was released following the 2011 census indicates that 31% of the population were aged between 45 and 59, the second largest group was people aged 30 to 44 with 14% of the population being in this age group . The neighbourhood statistics website showed that the mean age for people living in Layer Breton was 46.1. Out of the 287 usual residents in Layer Breton 55 were under the age of 18 and 57 of the usual residents were over the age of 60. The 2001 census indicates that 28% of the population were aged between 45 and 59 years old, the second largest group was persons aged 30–44 years old with 22% of Layer Breton's population being in this age category. Out of the 295 usual residents in 2001 52 were under the age of 18 and 60 of the usual residents were over the age of 60. In comparison, the number of people in the age group 45-59 has increased by 3% since 2001, whereas the population in the age group 30-44 decreased by 14% from 2001 to 2011.

House prices

House prices in Layer Breton March 2017

The current average value in Layer Breton in March 2017 is £564,891. This has decreased 0.03% from December 2016. Terraced properties sold for a current average value of £273,706 and semi-detached properties valued £342,126. In the past year property prices in Layer Breton have increased 5.80%. This is according to the current Zoopla estimates. 20 years ago the average house price was £298,998 the change of value has increased by £425,842, ten years later the average house price increased to £318,337 and 5 years later it increased to £359,000. In the past 3 months the average house price has decreased slightly by £179.

== Transport ==
There are no train stations in Layer Breton; the closest station is Marks Tey Rail Station which is 6.21 kilometres away. Destinations from this station include Ipswich, Colchester, Clacton-on-Sea and London Liverpool Street. No buses run on a Sunday in Layer Breton. On weekdays they vary from 6 to 8 buses a day into nearby parishes Birch and Layer De La Haye. Buses also run into Colchester, destinations including Colchester Zoo and Colchester Hospital. Other destinations the bus goes to are the Tollgate Centre in Colchester, Shrub End, Heckfordbridge, Great Wigborough, Salcott, Tollesbury and Tolleshunt D'arcy.
