= East Donyland =

Civil parish in Essex, England

Coordinates: 51.851443°N 0.949024°E

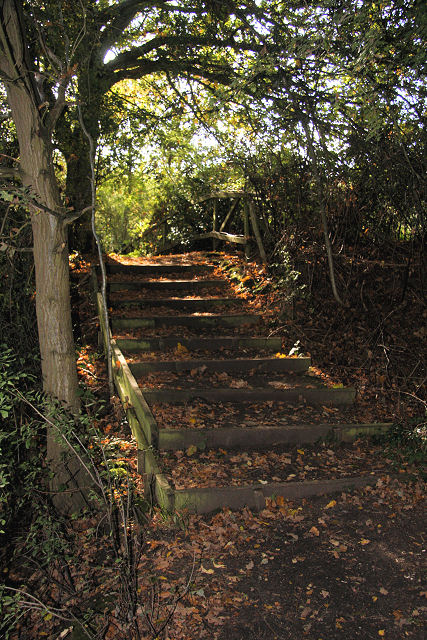
- A public footpath in woods in East Donyland

- Location within Essex
- Population: 2,522 (Parish, 2021)
- District: City of Colchester
- Shire county: Essex
- Region: East
- Country: England
- Sovereign state: United Kingdom
- Post town: COLCHESTER
- Postcode district: CO5
- Dialling code: 01206
- Police: Essex
- Fire: Essex
- Ambulance: East of England

East Donyland is a civil parish in the City of Colchester district of Essex, England. The main settlement in the parish is the village of Rowhedge. The parish also includes the country estate of East Donyland Hall. The parish lies to the south-east of Colchester. The neighbouring parish to the south is Fingringhoe, and to the east the parish is separated from its neighbour Wivenhoe by the River Colne. At the 2021 census the parish had a population of 2,522.

== History ==
The name "Donyland" means 'Land connected with Dunna'. In Saxon times there had been a single estate called Donyland covering an extensive area south of Colchester. The estate was split into four parts in the late 10th century. Three of the four parts of Donyland then came under the jurisdiction of the borough of Colchester; those three were collectively termed "West Donyland". The other part was outside the borough in the Lexden hundred, and became known as East Donyland. The Donyland estates were recorded in the Domesday Book of 1086 as 'Dunilanda'/'Dunulunda'.

East Donyland became a parish. The parish church, dedicated to St Lawrence, historically stood to the north of East Donyland Hall. A replacement parish church, also dedicated to St Lawrence, was built in 1838 on a new site in Rowhedge, which had come to be the largest settlement in the parish.

The parish has been subject to occasional adjustments to its boundaries with neighbouring parishes.
