= 1884 Colchester earthquake =

Earthquake in Essex, England

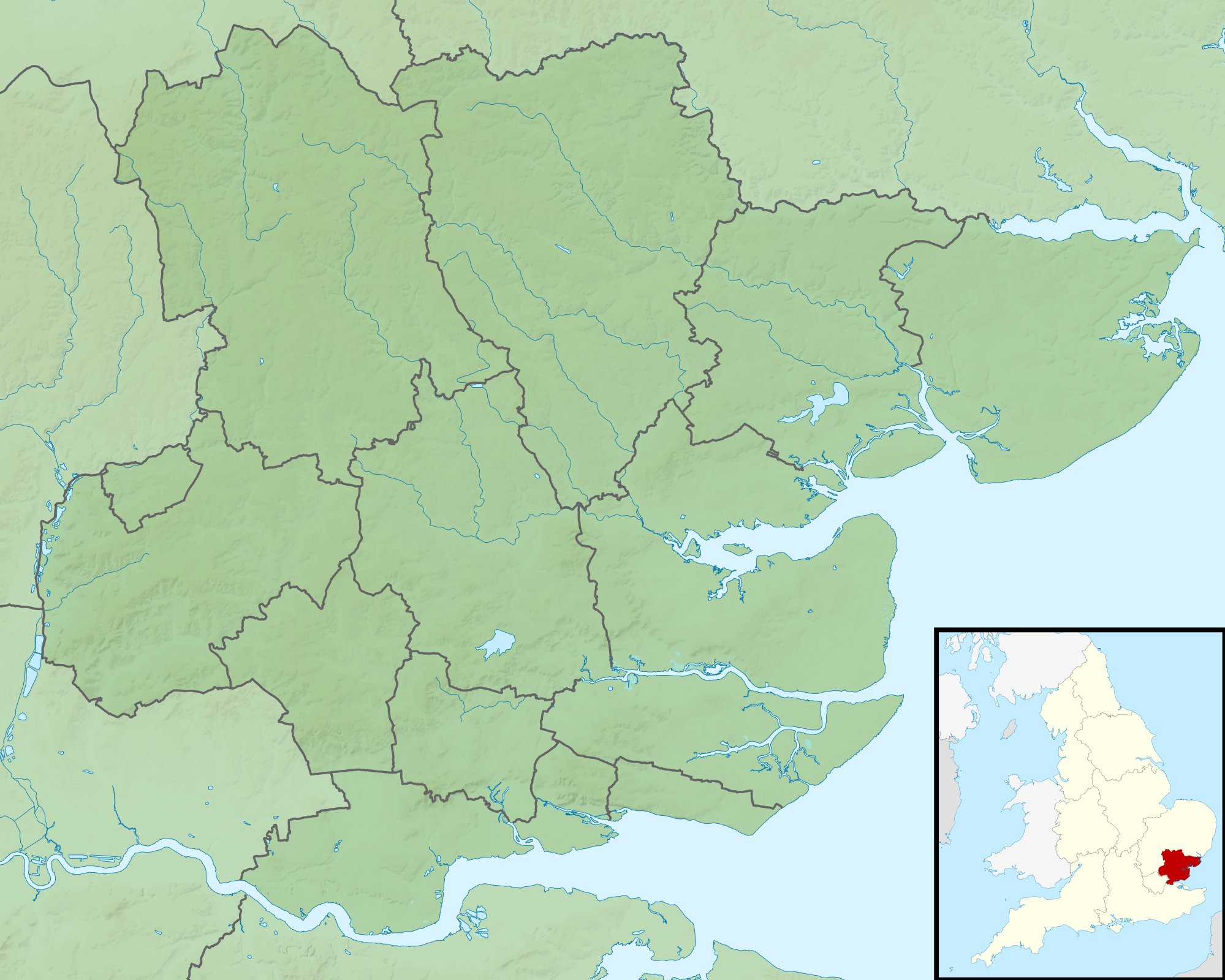
- Location within Essex
- Local date: 22 April 1884
- Local time: 09:18
- Magnitude: 4.6 M_{L}
- Depth: 3 km (1.9 mi)
- Epicentre: 51.82°N 0.90°E
- Areas affected: England, Essex
- Max. intensity: EMS-98 VIII (Heavily damaging)
- Casualties: 2 (indirect)

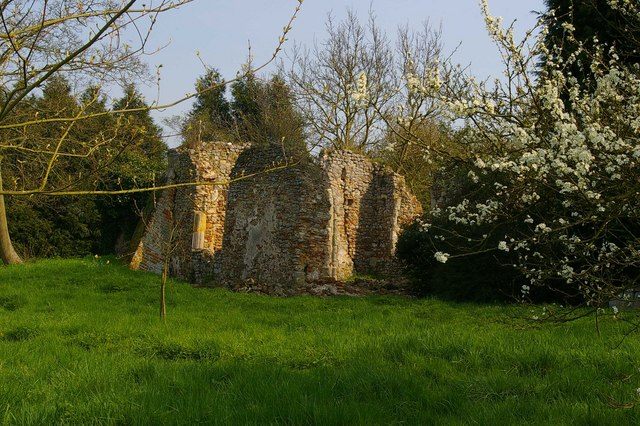
Ruins of Virley church, destroyed in the earthquake

The Colchester earthquake, also known as the Great English earthquake, occurred on the morning of 22 April 1884 at 09:18. It caused considerable damage in Colchester and the surrounding villages in Essex. In terms of overall destruction caused it is certainly the most destructive earthquake to have hit the United Kingdom in at least the last 400 years, since the Dover Straits earthquake of 1580.

== Earthquake ==
At 9:18 am the earthquake struck, centred mainly in the villages of Wivenhoe, Abberton, Langenhoe, and Peldon causing the surrounding area to rise and fall violently as the waves spread, lasting for around 20 seconds. Measuring 4.6 on the Richter scale, the effects were felt across England, as well as in northern France and Belgium.

It is believed that the earthquake resulted from movement along a fault in the ancient Palaeozoic rocks that underpin most of Essex, causing waves to propagate through the overlying Cretaceous and Tertiary layers.

The British Geological Survey estimates that the 1884 earthquake's magnitude was only around 4.6 on the Richter scale, compared with 6.1 for the 1931 Dogger Bank earthquake.

== Damage ==
The earthquake damaged about 1,250 buildings, including almost every building in Wivenhoe and Abberton, and in settlements all the way to Ipswich. The medieval church in Langenhoe was significantly damaged, as were those in the villages of Layer-de-la-Haye, Layer Marney, Layer Breton, and Peldon. In Peldon, the local newspapers claimed that every building had been damaged in some way. The Guardian reported that the earthquake was greeted with terror by the people near Colchester.

There are some reports that between three and five people were killed by the earthquake, but this has been disputed by other contemporary accounts and later analysis, which suggest that there were no fatalities directly caused by this event. The Times reported damage "in the many villages in the neighbourhood from Colchester to the sea coast", with many poor people made homeless, and estimated the cost of the disaster at £10,000. It did, however, mention the death of a child at Rowhedge, attributed to the earthquake. Mary Saunders, of Manningtree, drowned herself in the River Stour some days later. The large waves caused by the earthquake destroyed many small craft.

Langenhoe Church was badly damaged. Masonry tumbled off the tower, crashing into the roof of the nave and chancel. The nearby rectory was also damaged.

== See also ==
- List of earthquakes in the British Isles
- List of historical earthquakes
