= Eight Ash Green =

Village and civil parish in Essex, England

Coordinates: 51.896°N 0.822°E

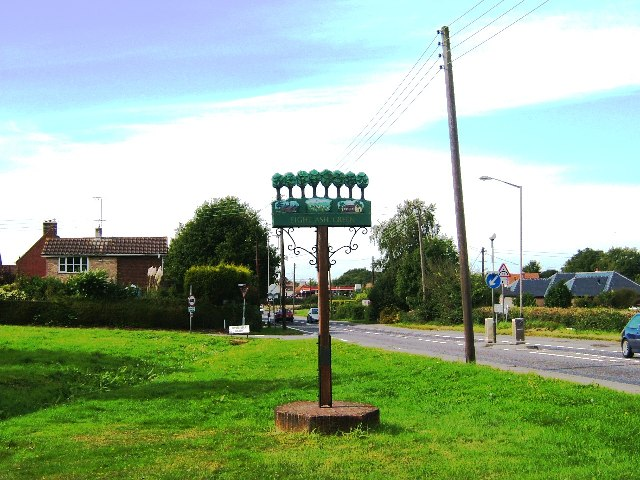
- The village sign in September 2005

- Location within Essex
- Population: 1,768 (Parish, 2021)
- Civil parish: Eight Ash Green
- District: Colchester
- Shire county: Essex
- Region: East
- Country: England
- Sovereign state: United Kingdom
- Post town: COLCHESTER
- Postcode district: CO6
- Police: Essex
- Fire: Essex
- Ambulance: East of England

Eight Ash Green is a village and civil parish in the City of Colchester district of Essex, England. It is on the A1124 road, near Junction 26 (Eight Ash Green Interchange) of the A12 road. At the 2021 census the parish had a population of 1,768.

The parish was formed on 1 April 1949 from parts of the parishes of Copford, Fordham, Stanway, and Aldham.
