= Little Yeldham =

Village in Essex, England

Coordinates: 52.02567°N 0.591803°E

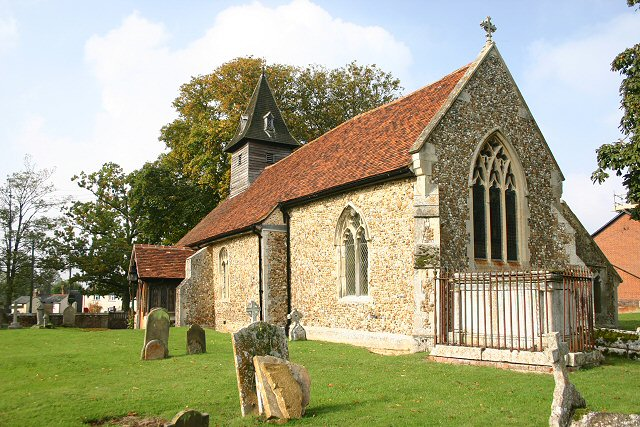
- St. John the Baptist church, Little Yeldham

- Location within Essex
- Population: 355 (Parish, 2021)
- OS grid reference: TL775395
- District: Braintree
- Shire county: Essex
- Region: East
- Country: England
- Sovereign state: United Kingdom
- Post town: Halstead
- Postcode district: CO9
- Dialling code: 01787
- Police: Essex
- Fire: Essex
- Ambulance: East of England
- UK Parliament: Braintree

Little Yeldham is a village and civil parish in north-west Essex, approximately one mile north east of Great Yeldham.At the 2021 census the parish had a population of 355.

== History ==
The Domesday Book of 1086 records Yeldham (now Great Yeldham and Little Yeldham) as being in the hundred of Hinckford and having a population of 40 households. The settlement is listed under four owners: Count Eustace (of Boulogne), Count Alan (of Brittany), Richard son of (Count) Gilbert and Ranulf brother of Ilger.

In 1818 the population was 221 with a Sunday School attendance of 56 children. By 1833 the population was 371 with a Sunday School attendance of 71 (31 males, 40 females).

== Buildings ==
St John the Baptist church stands on the east side of the village. The walls are of flint and pebble rubble and the roofs are tiled. The nave of the church was probably built in the 12th or 13th century, but the west wall was rebuilt in the 19th century. The chancel was rebuilt in the 15th century. There are two bells, said to be by Miles Graye, dating from 1674.
