= Wivenhoe =

Town in Essex, England

Coordinates: 51°52′00″N 00°57′45″E

- Town and civil parish
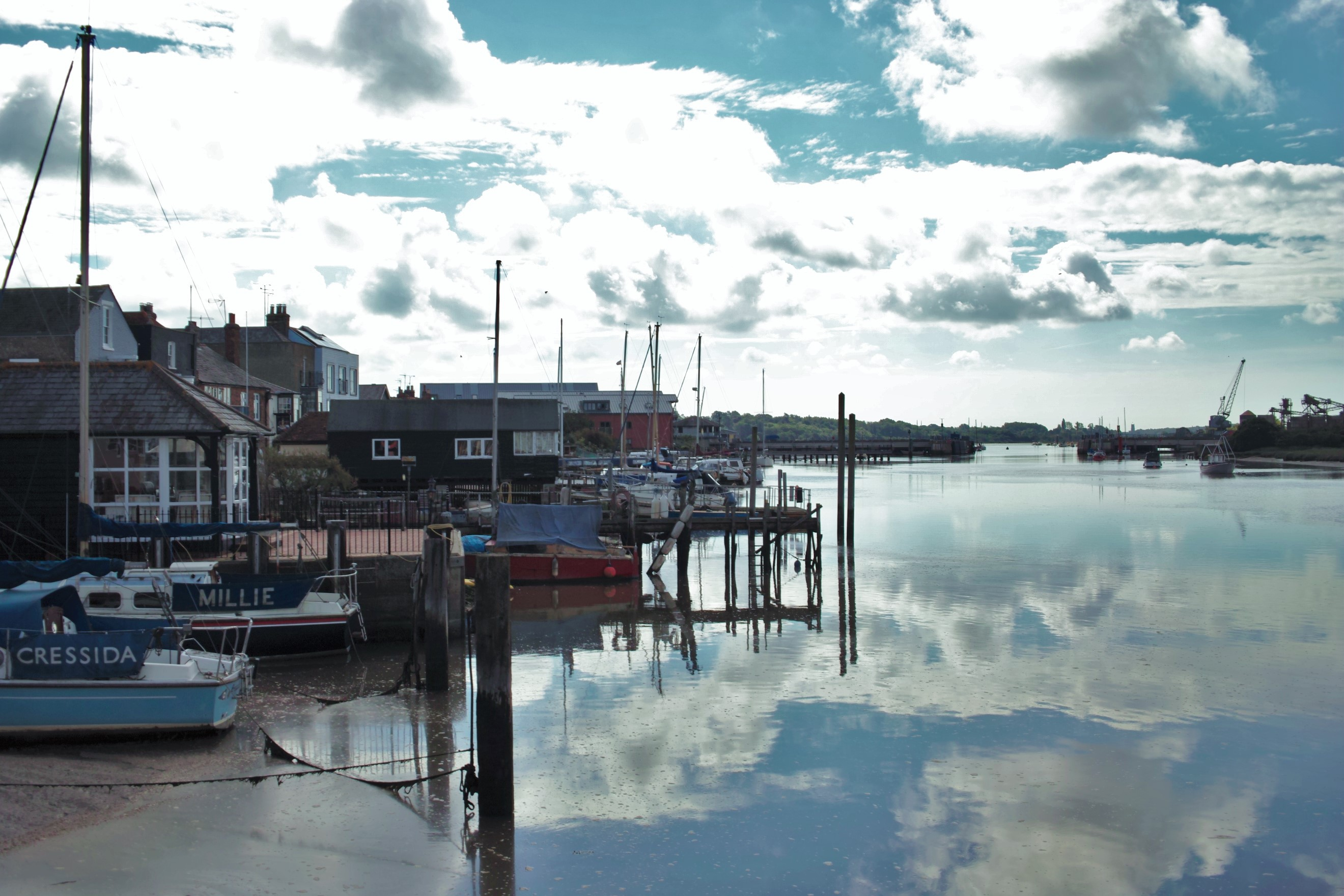
- Wivenhoe riverfront on the River Colne

- Location within Essex
- Population: 7,586 (Parish, 2021); 7,350 (Built up area, 2021)
- OS grid reference: TM045225
- Civil parish: Wivenhoe
- District: Colchester
- Shire county: Essex
- Region: East
- Country: England
- Sovereign state: United Kingdom
- Post town: COLCHESTER
- Postcode district: CO7
- Dialling code: 01206
- Police: Essex
- Fire: Essex
- Ambulance: East of England
- UK Parliament: Harwich and North Essex

Wivenhoe (/ˈwɪvənhoʊ/ WIV-ən-hoh) is a town and civil parish in the City of Colchester district of Essex, England. It lies approximately 3 miles (5 km) south-east of Colchester. The historic core of Wivenhoe stands on the left bank of the River Colne, which is tidal at this point. At the 2021 census the parish had a population of 7,586 and the built up area had a population of 7,350.

The town's history centres on fishing, ship building and smuggling.

Much of lower Wivenhoe is also a designated conservation area, with many streets being of particular architectural interest. The urban area has grown up the hill away from the river to absorb the formerly separate hamlet of Wivenhoe Cross on the higher ground to the north-east.

== Etymology ==
The place-name Wivenhoe is Saxon in origin, deriving from the personal name Wifa's or Wife's spur or promontory (hoe). The place-name is now usually pronounced 'Wivvenho', but the Essex accent would traditionally have rendered it as 'Wivvenhoo'. According to folk etymology, the name derived from "Wyvernhoe", originating from the mythical beast called a wyvern and the previously mentioned ridge (hoe). The town's football team, Wivenhoe Town FC, is nicknamed 'The Wyverns'.

== History ==
Wivenhoe is recorded in the Domesday Book of 1086 as Wiivnhou in the hundred of Lexden, when it formed part of the land of Robert Gernon, where there was a mill, 12 acres (4.9 ha) of meadow and pasture for 60 sheep.

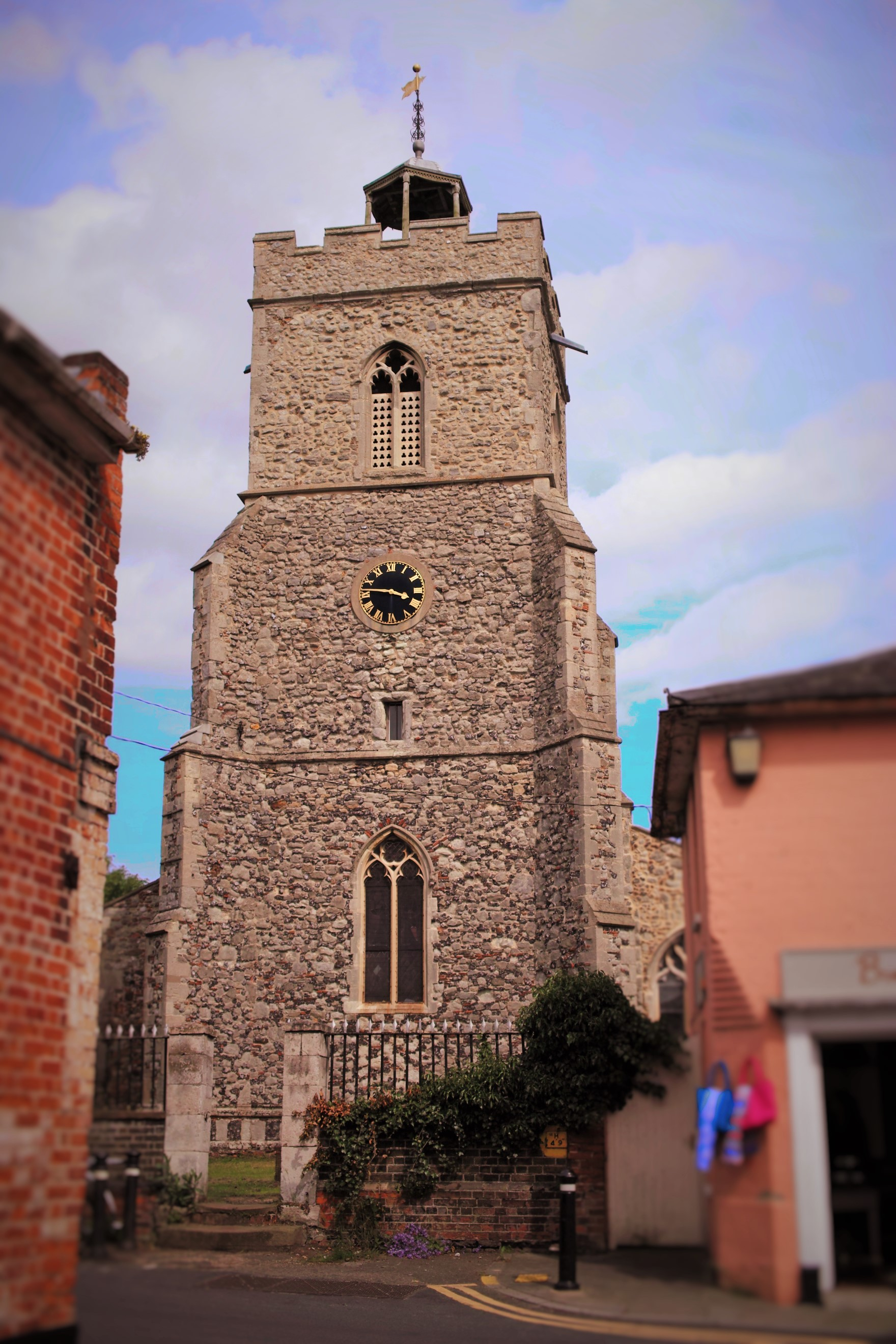
St Mary's Church, Wivenhoe

The church of St. Mary the Virgin is in the High Street and existed by 1254 when Simon Battle was the patron. The North and South aisles were built in 1340 and 1350, making it the oldest building still standing in Wivenhoe. It has a chancel with north and south chapels and a north vestry, an aisled and clerestoried nave with north and south porches, and a west tower on which there is an open-sided cupola added to the roof by 1734. The walls are of rubble, which includes some Roman tile, with ashlar dressings. Elizabeth de Vere (d. 1537), widow of John, 13th earl of Oxford, left Wivenhoe church the vestments and ornaments from her private chapel. The tower was plastered in 1563.

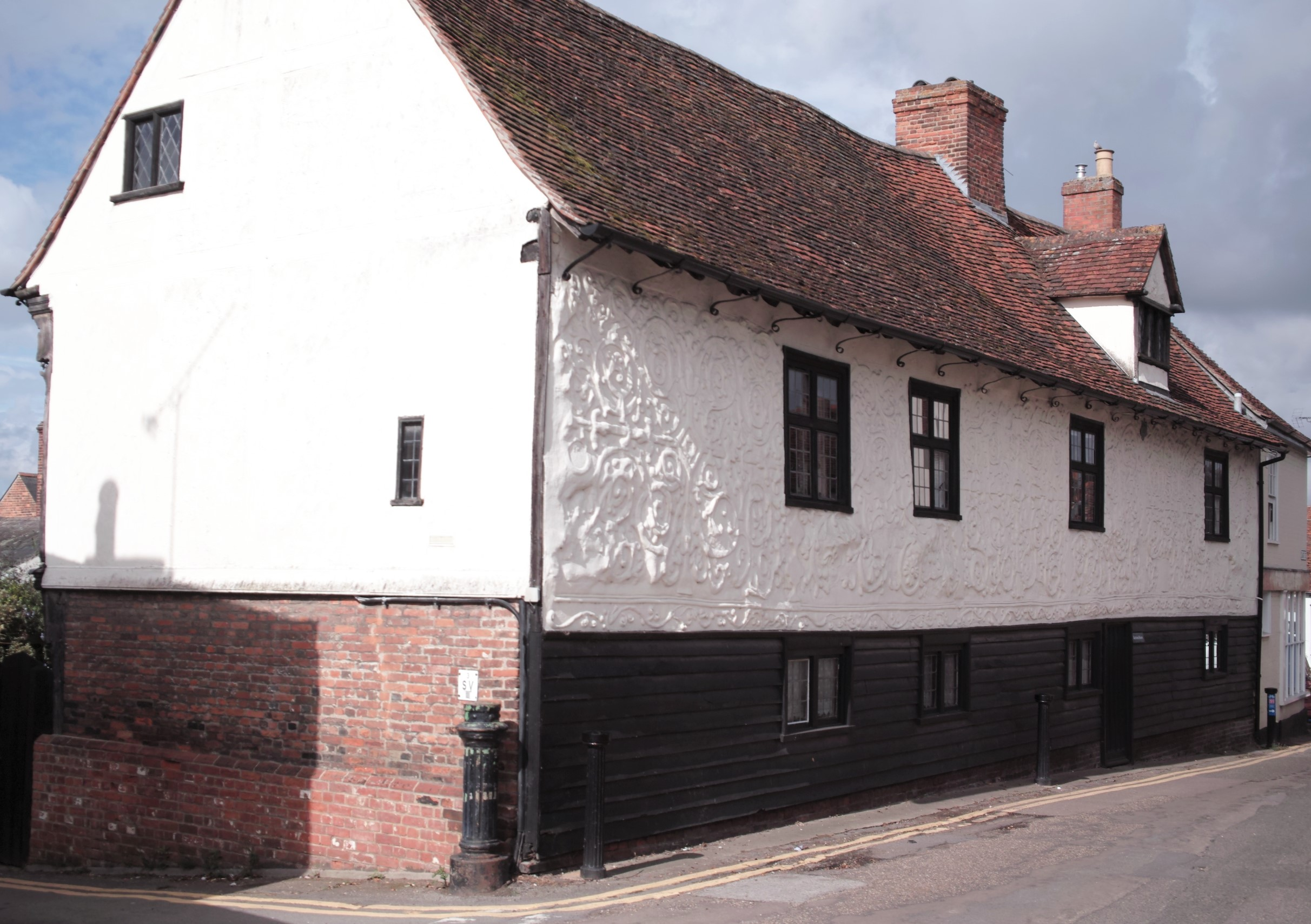
The old Garrison House in East Street, Wivenhoe displays one of the finest examples of pargeting in the region, and was built around 1675

Wivenhoe developed as a port and until the late 19th century was effectively a port for Colchester, as large ships were unable to navigate any further up the River Colne, which widens here into its estuary. Wivenhoe had two prosperous shipyards. It became an important port for trade for Colchester and developed shipbuilding, commerce and fishing industries. The period of greatest prosperity for the town came with the arrival of the railway in 1863.

In 1884 the town suffered significant damage when it lay close to the epicentre of one of the most destructive UK earthquakes of all time – the 1884 Colchester earthquake. In 1890, there was a population of about 2,000 mostly engaged in fishing for oysters and sprats and in ship and yacht building. A dry dock was built in 1889 and extended in 1904, making it one of the largest on the East Coast; it was demolished in the mid-1960s. In the 1960s, Wivenhoe Park was chosen as the location for the University of Essex.

During the UK miners' strike, the now defunct Wivenhoe Port imported coal and became subject to picketing by miners (many from Yorkshire), which led to a very substantial police presence, some of them drafted in from other counties, and violent skirmishes as striking miners tried to prevent vehicles entering and leaving the port.

== Wivenhoe Park ==
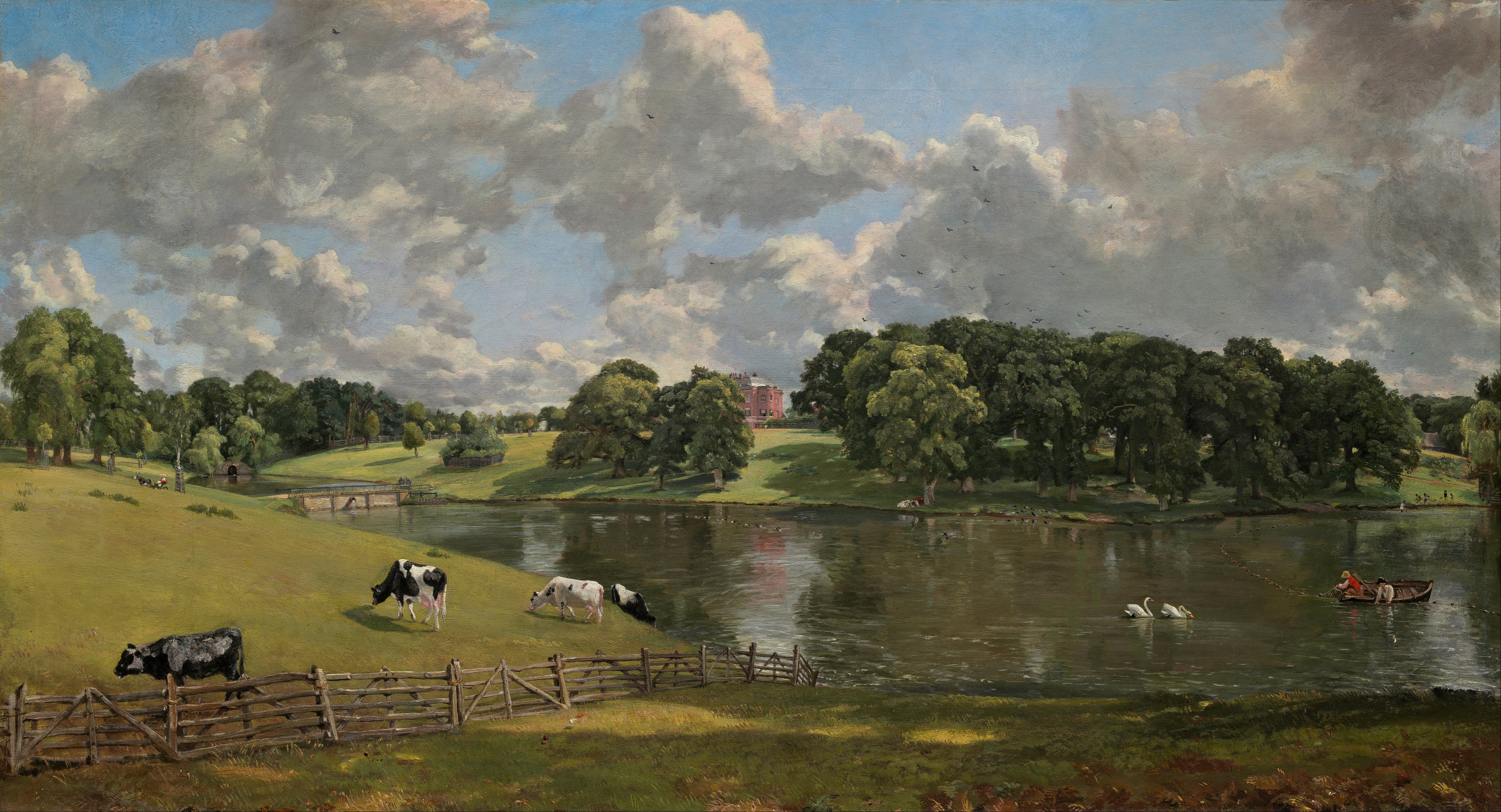
Wivenhoe Park, by John Constable, 1816. (National Gallery of Art in Washington, D.C.)

Wivenhoe Park, bordering on the town of Colchester, is the location for the University of Essex. The site was the home for several centuries of the Rebow family, descendants of Flemish clothweavers from Colchester. Wivenhoe House was designed for Isaac Martin Rebow in 1759 by Thomas Reynolds; the park itself was designed by Richard Woods and was remodelled in 1846–1847 by Thomas Hopper. A view of the house across the lake was painted by John Constable on a social visit to Major-General Francis Slater Rebow in 1816 for a fee of 100 guineas.

== Governance ==
There are three tiers of local government covering Wivenhoe, at parish (town), district, and county level: Wivenhoe Town Council, Colchester City Council and Essex County Council. The parish council is based at an office at 77 High Street.

=== Administrative history ===
Wivenhoe was an ancient parish in the Lexden hundred of Essex. When elected parish and district councils were created in 1894, Wivenhoe was given a parish council and included in the Lexden and Winstree Rural District. The parish was subsequently converted into an urban district in 1898.

Wivenhoe Urban District was abolished in 1974, becoming part of a much enlarged borough of Colchester (the borough subsequently gained city status in 2022). A successor parish called Wivenhoe was created as part of the 1974 reforms, covering the area of the former urban district, with its parish council taking the name Wivenhoe Town Council.

== Transport ==
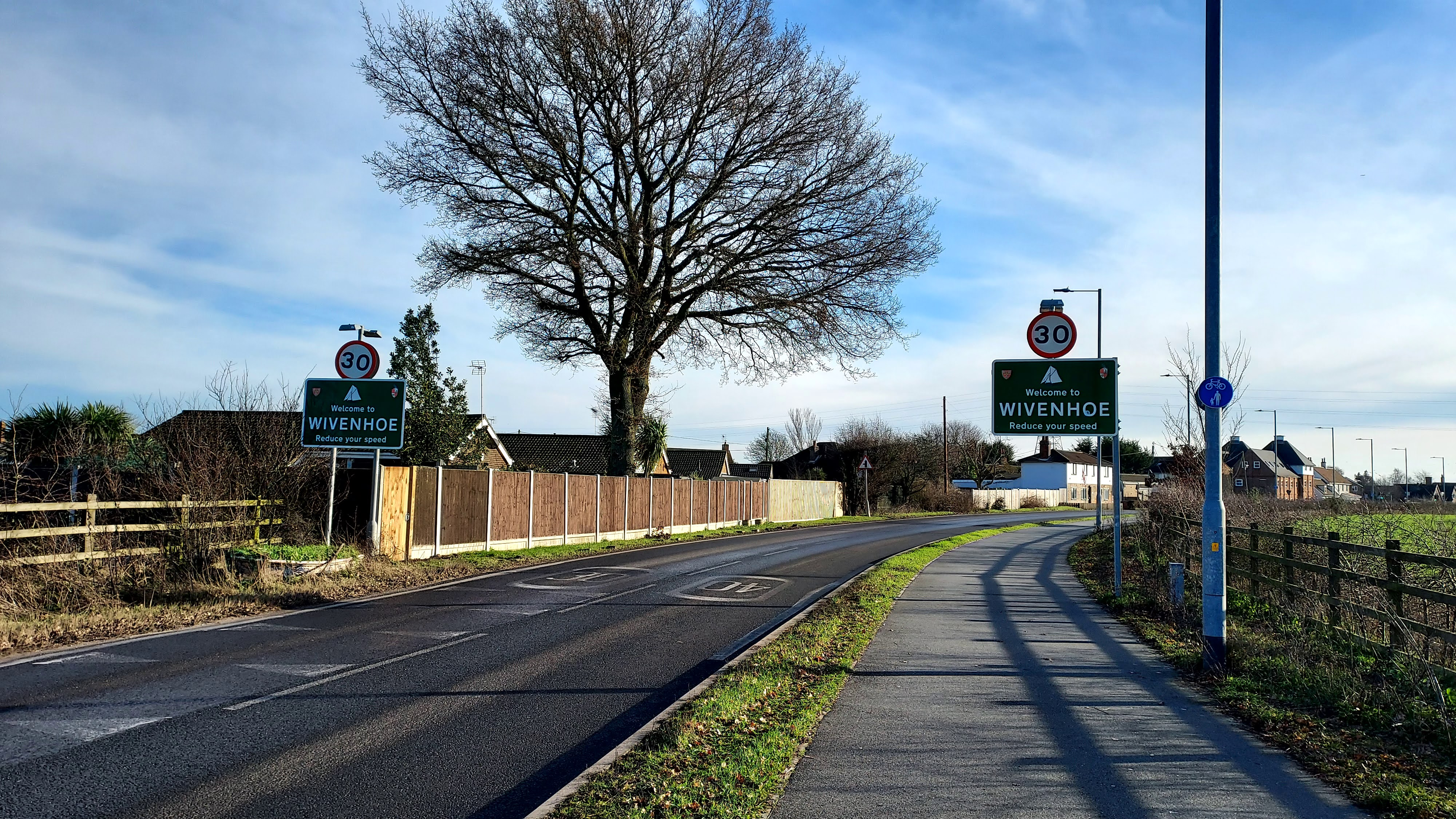
Colchester Road connecting Wivenhoe and the University of Essex

Wivenhoe railway station is situated on the Sunshine Coast Line, a branch off the Great Eastern Main Line, which links Colchester with the seaside resorts of Clacton-on-Sea and Walton-on-the-Naze. Direct electric services, operated by Greater Anglia, run from Wivenhoe station to Clacton-on-Sea, Walton-on-the-Naze, Colchester and London Liverpool Street. The station was the junction for the now defunct line to Brightlingsea (1866–1964).

The town is connected by a seasonal foot ferry service, which runs on weekends and bank holidays according to the tide from April to mid-October, across the river Colne to Fingringhoe and Rowhedge. A boat service also runs during the Summer with dates determined by tide, from Brightlingsea. Connecting water links for this service are also available from St. Osyth and East Mersea.

Local bus services are operated by First Essex and Hedingham & Chambers. Routes serving Wivenhoe include the 74 from Colchester to Clacton.

Wivenhoe is located just over one hour away from Stansted Airport and 30 minutes from Harwich International Port.

== Society and leisure ==
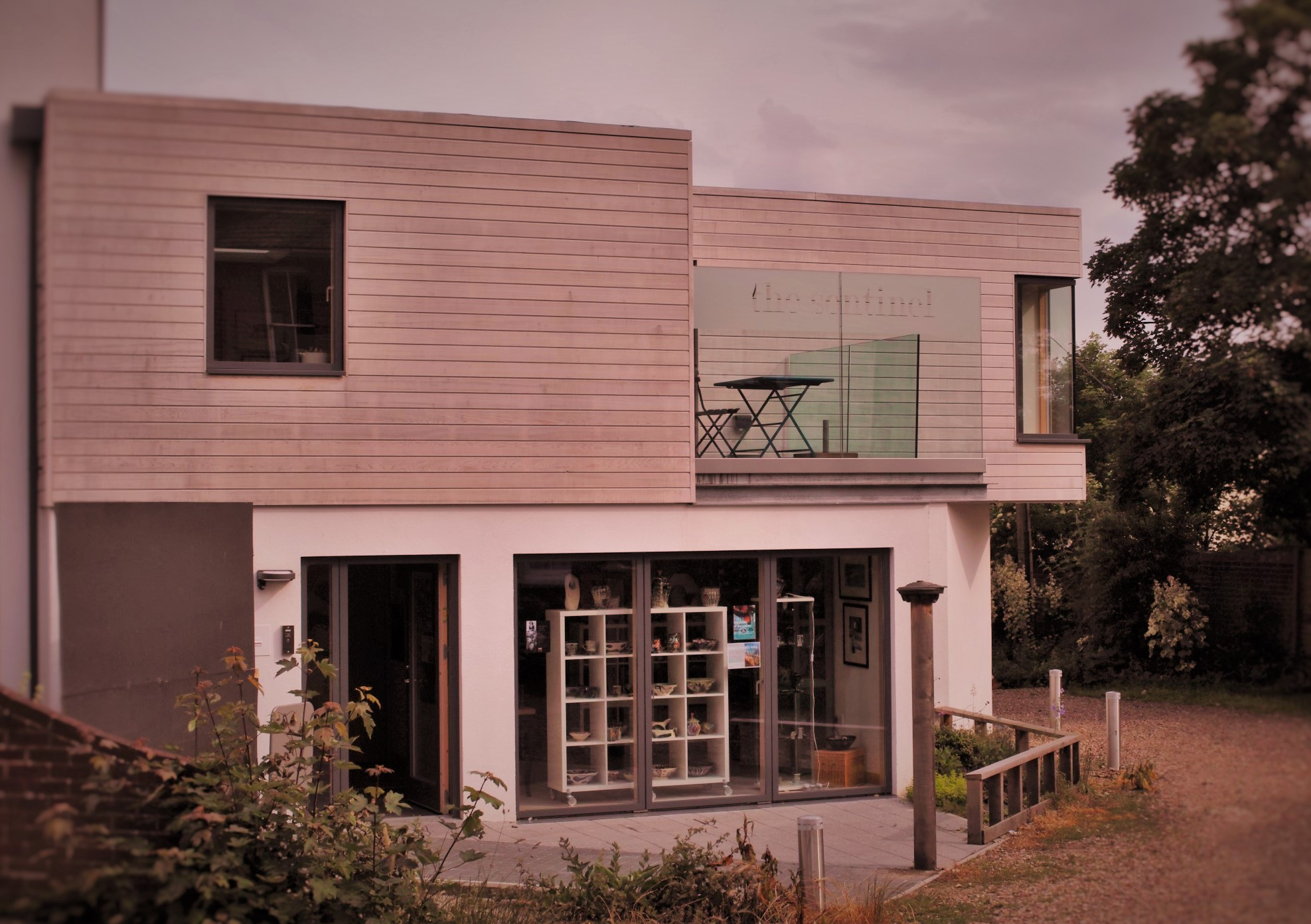
The Sentinel Gallery, Wivenhoe

Wivenhoe has a population of between nine and ten thousand people with a mixture of students from the University of Essex, a long-standing artistic community, and commuters. Property prices averaged £286,000 in February 2008. The town has a number of small local shops: there is a bookshop which was established in 1976, (shortlisted for the national Independent Bookseller of the Year award 2008) a chemist, two post offices, corner house coffee shop, toy shop, delicatessen, tea rooms, Co-op, pet supplier, florist and art gallery. There are five pubs including the Black Buoy Pub, Horse and Groom, The Greyhound, The Station, and the Rose and Crown. Some of which are the venue for musical events, including a jazz club. The Crab & Winkle Gallery can be found at the town's railway station. The town is popular with students from the university who walk from the campus to enjoy the facilities of the town's public houses and its waterfront.

The town has a number of sports and leisure clubs and societies: Wivenhoe Sailing Club's clubhouse is just downstream of the river barrier. Wivenhoe Town Football Club play at Broad Lane Sports Ground, which is also used by Colchester United Ladies and was home to Wivenhoe Old Boys Football Club, and is also home to Wivenhoe Tennis Club. Wivenhoe Town Cricket Club is located on Rectory Road. There are a number of musical and theatre groups, and an art gallery. The King George V Playing Field is in the lower half of the town, with a small skate park, football pitches, a small play park and a dog-walking area. There is a bowls club on De Vere Lane and a bridge club meets in the Town Council's offices.

== Media ==
Local news and television programmes are provided by BBC East and ITV Anglia. Television signals are received from the Sudbury TV transmitter and the local relay transmitter. Local radio stations are BBC Essex, Heart East, Greatest Hits Radio Essex, Actual Radio and Colne Radio, a community based station. The town is served by local newspapers, Colchester Gazette, Essex County Standard and East Anglian Daily Times.

== Education ==
Wivenhoe has two primary schools: Broomgrove Infant and Junior, and Millfields Primary.

Secondary schools are available in the surrounding area. The University of Essex has been located at Wivenhoe Park since 1964.

== Notable residents ==
Wivenhoe manor was owned by John de Vere, 12th Earl of Oxford and was passed down with the earldom until sold by Edward de Vere, 17th Earl of Oxford in 1584. The actor-manager Sir John Martin-Harvey was born in the village in 1863 (died 1944) and is commemorated by a blue plaque on Quay House, one of his childhood homes. He was the son of yacht-designer John Harvey and grandson of Thomas Harvey, yacht builder. The Volante was built by Thomas Harvey & Son (Thomas & Thomas Harvey junior) in the Halifax Yard at Ipswich. The "Volante" competed in the first America's Cup in 1851.

Harry Bensley, who became famous for taking on a wager to walk around Britain and eighteen other countries while wearing an iron mask and pushing a perambulator, lived in the village with his wife Kate after having served in the First World War, whilst pianist and popular entertainer Semprini (1908–1990) lived in Talisman House, adjacent to the high street in Wivenhoe, during his retirement.

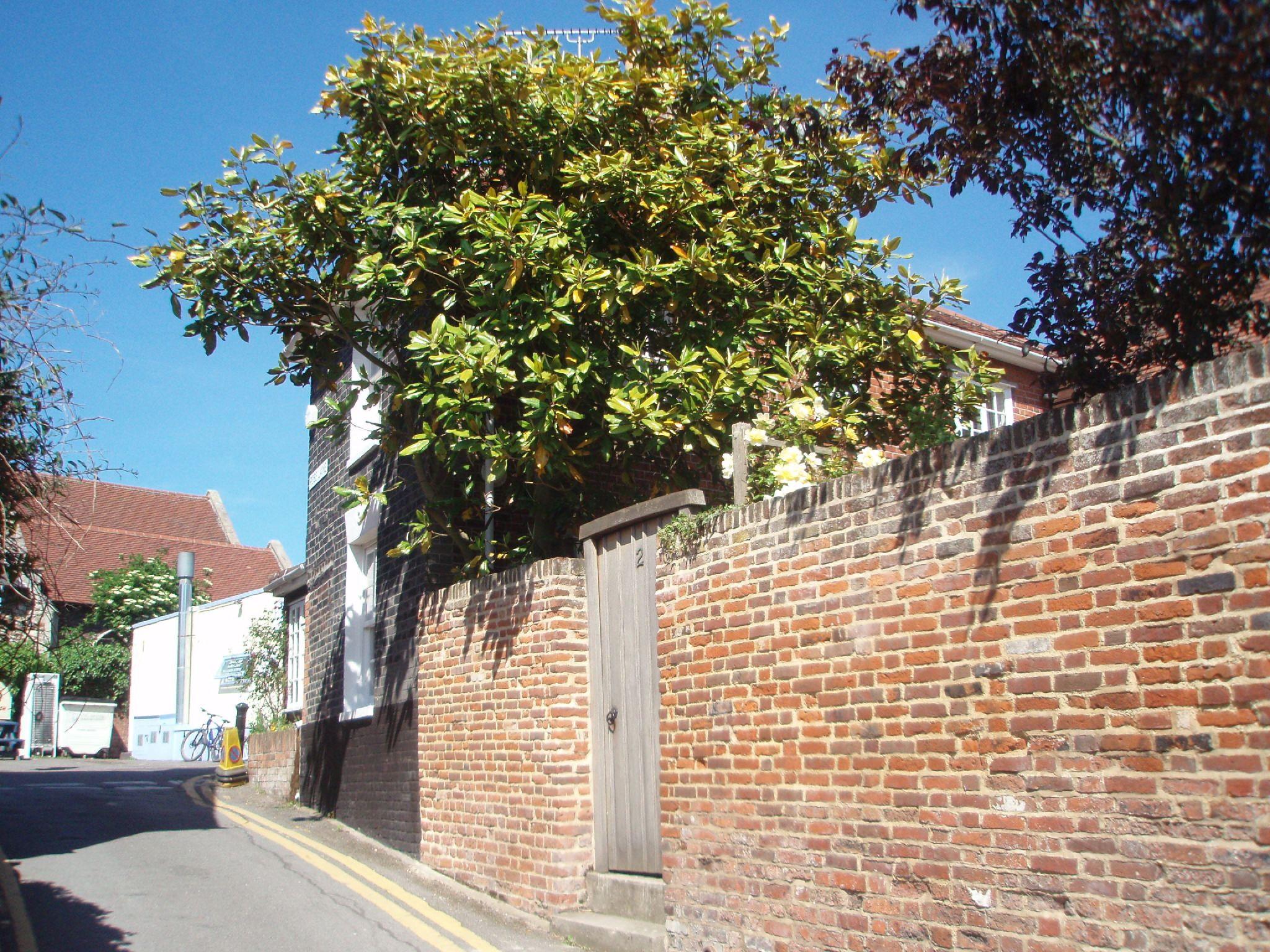
Rose Lane, Wivenhoe, home of Joan Hickson

Wivenhoe was also the home of actress Joan Hickson (1906–1998) who played Miss Marple in the BBC adaptations of Agatha Christie's novels and children's author, journalist, and writer Leila Berg (1917–2012). Berg was an advocate for the empowerment of children, particularly through literature, which prompted her to devise and launch the 'Nippers' series of early readers books published by Macmillan in 1968, which sought to address the exclusion of working-class and ethnic minority lives from children's books.

British academic Anthony Everitt (b. 1940) who publishes regularly in The Guardian and The Financial Times also lives in Wivenhoe. Everitt was Secretary-General of the Arts Council of Great Britain and is author of Cicero: The Life and Times of Rome's Greatest Politician. He is a visiting professor in the performing and visual arts at Nottingham Trent University, a companion of the Liverpool Institute for Performing Arts and an Honorary Fellow of the Dartington College of Arts. Other residents include the poet and musician Martin Newell, writer A. L. Kennedy, James Dodds, painter, printmaker and publisher under the imprint of Jardine Press, who has been described as "boatbuilding's artist laureate", and the singer Polly Scattergood, who was born in Wivenhoe before moving to London.

Painter Francis Bacon owned a house on Queens Road (no. 68) which he purchased for £6,500 so he could spend time out of London visiting his friends, the artists Dickie Chopping (1917–2008) and Denis Wirth-Miller (1915–2011). The house remained as it was for many years after his death in 1992. Several journalists and writers have also been based in the lower end of the town: George Gale (former editor of The Spectator, Daily Telegraph cartoonist and Daily Express columnist) parodied by Private Eye magazine as 'George G. Ale', and Peregrine Worsthorne, (former editor of the Sunday Telegraph) who both had homes there. Poet and political activist Anna Mendelson (as 'Grace Lake') was a resident of Wivenhoe and associated with the short-lived British terrorist organisation the Angry Brigade whilst a student at Essex University.

The musician Keith Christmas was born in Wivenhoe in 1946.

== Sources ==
- Butler, Nicholas (1989). The Story of Wivenhoe. Quentin Press. ISBN 0-947614-01-X.
- Haining, Peter (1976). The Great English Earthquake. Robert Hale. ISBN 0-7091-5395-3.
- Collins & Dodds (2009). River Colne Shipbuilders, A Portrait of Shipbuilding 1786–1988. Jardine Press. ISBN 978-0-9552035-8-9.
