= Great and Little Wigborough =

- Civil parish
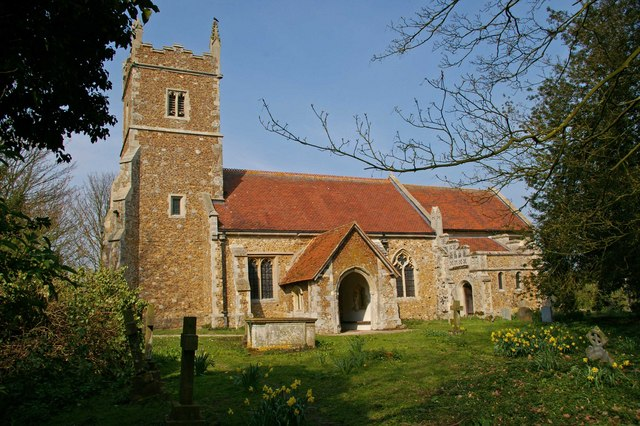
- St Stephen’s Church, Great Wigborough
- Interactive map of Great and Little Wigborough
- Coordinates: 51.801397°N 0.86116076°E
- Country: England
- Primary council: Colchester
- County: Essex
- Region: East of England
- Created: 1953
- Status: Parish
- Main settlements: Great Wigborough and Little Wigborough

Area
  - Total: 13.5 km^{2} (5.2 sq mi)

Population (Parish, 2021)
  - Total: 231
  - Density: 17.1/km^{2} (44.3/sq mi)

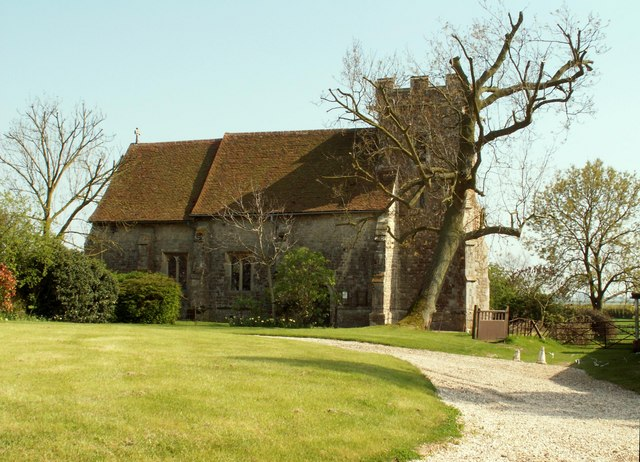
Little Wigborough church

Great and Little Wigborough is a civil parish in the City of Colchester district of Essex, England, about 6 miles (10 km) from Colchester. The parish includes the villages of Great Wigborough and Little Wigborough and the hamlet of Stafford's Corner on the B1026 road. The parish was created in 1953 as a merger of the two ancient parishes of Great Wigborough and Little Wigborough. At the 2021 census the parish had a population of 231.

The parish shares a grouped parish council with the neighbouring parishes of Peldon, Salcott, and Virley; the parish council is called the Winstred Hundred Parish Council.

== History ==
The name "Wigborough" means 'Wicga's hill'. Wigborough was recorded in the Domesday Book as Wi(c)gheberga.

Great Wigborough and Little Wigborough were both ancient parishes. They were merged into a single parish called Great and Little Wigborough in 1953, subject to an adjustment to the boundary with Layer de la Haye at the same time.

There are 18 listed buildings in Great and Little Wigborough.

== Governance ==
There are three tiers of local government covering Great and Little Wigborough, at parish, district, and county level: Winstred Hundred Parish Council, Colchester City Council, and Essex County Council. The parish council is a grouped parish council, also covering the neighbouring parishes of Peldon, Salcott, and Virley.
