= Layer Marney =

Village in Essex, England

Coordinates: 51.823°N 0.797°E

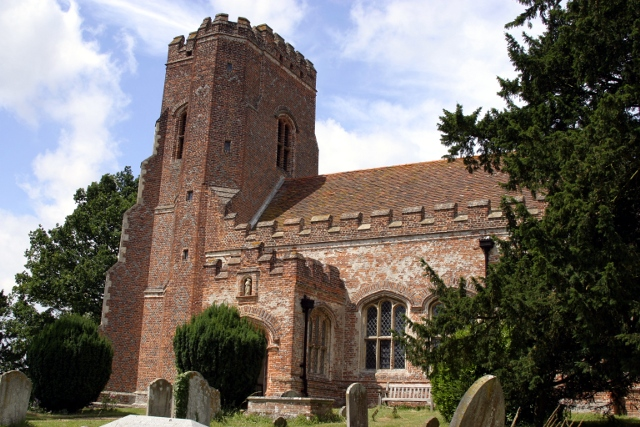
- Parish church of St Mary the Virgin

- Location within Essex
- Population: 230 (Parish, 2021)
- Civil parish: Layer Marney
- District: Colchester
- Shire county: Essex
- Region: East
- Country: England
- Sovereign state: United Kingdom
- Post town: COLCHESTER
- Postcode district: CO5

Layer Marney is a village and civil parish in the Colchester district of Essex, England, near Tiptree. The parish includes the hamlet of Smythe's Green. Layer Marney has a Tudor palace called Layer Marney Tower and the Church of St Mary the Virgin. At the 2021 census the parish had a population of 230. Layer Marney is the westernmost and least populous of the three neighbouring parishes called Layer, the others being Layer Breton and Layer-de-la-Haye.

== History ==
In the Domesday Book of 1086 there were a number of manorial estates at a place simply called Layer in the Winstree hundred of Essex. No church or priest was mentioned in any of the entries for Layer in the Domesday Book. The Layer area subsequently came to comprise the three parishes of Layer Marney, Layer Breton, and Layer-de-la-Haye.

In 1879 Kezia Peache and her brother became the Lord and Lady of the Manor of Layer Marney. The Peache siblings paid for the substantial repairs required to Layer Marney Tower.
