= Salcott =

Village in Essex, England

Coordinates: 51.787°N 0.826°E

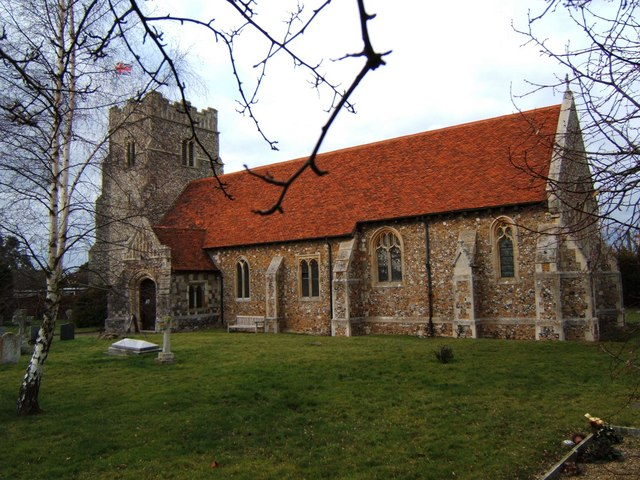
- St Mary's Church

- Location within Essex
- Population: 263 (Parish, 2021)
- OS grid reference: TL 950 135
- Civil parish: Salcott
- District: Colchester
- Shire county: Essex
- Region: East
- Country: England
- Sovereign state: United Kingdom
- Post town: Maldon
- Postcode district: CM9
- Dialling code: 01621
- Police: Essex
- Fire: Essex
- Ambulance: East of England
- UK Parliament: Witham

Salcott is a village and civil parish in the City of Colchester district of Essex, England. Salcott closely adjoins the neighbouring village of Virley of the opposite side of Virley Brook; they are sometimes described as a single village of Salcott-cum-Virley. They have formed a single ecclesiastical parish called Salcott Virley since 1879. Salcott is adjacent to Tolleshunt Knights, Tollesbury and Great Wigborough, near Tiptree. At the 2021 census the parish had a population of 263. Salcott shares a grouped parish council with the neighbouring parishes of Great and Little Wigborough, Peldon, and Virley, called the Winstred Hundred Parish Council.

== History ==
The name Salcott is believed to come from "salt cote", linked to the historic industry of salt extraction on the adjacent marshes.

In the Domesday Book of 1086 a manor called Salcott was listed in the ownership of a Robert of Verly. By the 14th century a larger village also called Salcott had been established on the opposite of the brook. To distinguish the two, the older Salcott north of the brook became known as Salcott Virley and later just as Virley, whereas the newer Salcott south of the brook became known as Salcott Wigborough, on account of it being in the parish of Great Wigborough. At one time, Salcott Wigborough had a market. Salcott Wigborough eventually just became known as Salcott.

Salcott's fortunes dived in the early 1500s and it is believed many of the village fishermen turned to smuggling to scrape a living.

The communities have been connected by a wooden bridge across Salcott Creek for many years, and there was rivalry between the two. Folklore says that one side called the other "yellow bellies" over a particular incident, the detail of which has been lost in time. In 1977 the Silver Jubilee of Elizabeth II was marked by a tug of war across the creek.

Salcott Wigborough had a chapel of ease to its parish church at Great Wigborough from the 14th century, and subsequently became a separate parish. Salcott Virley and Salcott Wigborough parishes were united for ecclesiastical purposes in 1879.

Although Salcott and Virley have formed a single ecclesiastical parish since 1879, they remain separate civil parishes. They are now both covered by the same grouped parish council, the Winstred Hundred Parish Council, which also covers the neighbouring parishes of Great and Little Wigborough and Peldon.

== Churches ==
Salcot and Virley each had a church dedicated to St Mary the Virgin. After the ecclesiastical parishes were united in 1879 the church at Salcott was used as the main church, and the already dilapidated church at Virley was closed. Both buildings were damaged in the 1884 Colchester earthquake; that at Virley was left in ruins, whilst the church at Salcott was repaired and remains in use today.
