= Layer de la Haye =

Village in Essex, England

Coordinates: 51.843°N 0.858°E

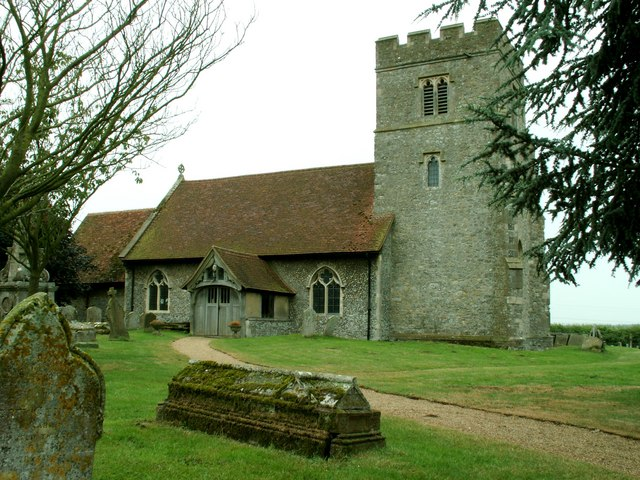
- St. John the Baptist church, Layer de la Haye

- Location within Essex
- Population: 1,767 (Parish, 2021)
- OS grid reference: TL968199
- Civil parish: Layer-de-la-Haye
- District: City of Colchester
- Shire county: Essex
- Region: East
- Country: England
- Sovereign state: United Kingdom
- Post town: COLCHESTER
- Postcode district: CO2
- Dialling code: 01206
- Police: Essex
- Fire: Essex
- Ambulance: East of England
- UK Parliament: Witham

Layer de la Haye, sometimes hyphenated as Layer-de-la-Haye, (Note: The official name of the civil parish is hyphenated, and the hyphenated version is also used by Royal Mail in official postal addresses. The parish council omits the hyphens, as do road signs in the village.) is a village and civil parish in the City of Colchester district of Essex, England. It is the largest and easternmost of the three neighbouring parishes called Layer, the others being Layer Breton and Layer Marney. At the 2021 census, the parish had a population of 1,767.

== History ==
The village is thought to have been founded in Saxon times, with its original name, Legra, meaning 'lookout'. Its elevation made it an ideal vantage point for the Saxons against raiding parties from the coast. Later its name changed to Leire or Leger, meaning 'mud'. A Norse word, this is likely to have referred to the soil and marshland around the village. During the time of the Norman Conquests, the village was "owned" by the de la Hayes, and its name thus changed to Layer de la Haye. Layer was ravaged by the Black Death of the 14th Century. The Church became derelict until it was restored by monks.

In 1289, John de Rye donated 160 acres (65 ha) of land to St John's Abbey in Colchester. As a token of appreciation, a manor and farm were named after him (Rye Manor and Rye Farm respectively). At the end of the 15th century, the Abbey built a toll-gate house, now called the Greate House (originally the Gate House) near Malting Green.

At the time of the dissolution of the Monasteries which began in 1536, Sir Thomas Audley, who in turn became speaker of the House of Commons and Lord Chancellor, appropriated the manors of Rye and Blind Knights, together with the Mill and the patronage of the benefice. Layer Mill is mentioned in the Domesday Book as a water-mill. The mill wheel was powered by water from the Roman River.

Within the churchyard of St John the Baptist lie the graves of Arthur Cecil Alport (a South African physician who first identified the Alport syndrome in a British family in 1927), Cuthbert Alport (a Conservative Party politician, minister and life peer) and General Sir Ivo Vesey (a British Army officer who served as Chief of the General Staff in India from 1937 to 1939).

Layer de la Haye is among the villages which suffered damage from the 1884 Colchester earthquake.

== Facilities ==
The village has a Church of England primary school for children up to the age of eleven. They run a number of after-school clubs, including a girls football club, which is organised by Colchester United F.C.

The parish church is dedicated to St John the Baptist. There has been a church building at its location since at least 1128, when it was mentioned in documents, although some of the fabric appears to be earlier than that date. For over 400 years, priests were supplied by the Abbey of St John or the Priory of St Botolph, in Colchester. The nave and tower date from 1350, when they were rebuilt by the monks of St Botolph. During the 19th century, a south aisle was added, to accommodate the increased population of the village. Parish registers go back to 1752, as earlier ones were destroyed in a fire. The tower houses five bells, the oldest of which dates from 1459. A project to install a new bell frame was completed in 2001. The church is part of the benefice of Thurstable and Winstree, a group of eight parishes covering an area to the south of Colchester. There are close links with the parishes of Birch, Layer Breton, and Layer Marney.

Part of Abberton Reservoir is located within the parish, and Essex Wildlife Trust manage a visitor centre which is accessed from Church Road, Layer de la Haye. The site is of international importance for wild fowl, with up to 40,000 birds visiting it each year. Construction of the reservoir was authorised in 1935 by an Act of Parliament, which also authorised the building of Layer de la Haye Treatment Works. This processes water from the reservoir, from where it is piped to Tiptree to be mixed with water from other sources, before it enters the drinking water supply system. The buildings at the treatment works are good examples of International Modern Movement structures.

== Population ==
In 1950 its population was under 700; by 1975 it was over 1,000 and in 1990 it was just short of 2,000. However, the proximity of Colchester, with its large range of shops and facilities, eventually forced all of the three shops in Layer to close. The Layer Village Store was reopened by new owners in 2015.

Despite concerns over vandalism and anti-social behaviour, the village is generally regarded as a safe and happy place to be. Societies and clubs provide entertainment for the whole village community.

== House prices ==
Layer-De-La-Haye, with an overall average price of £444,714 was more expensive than nearby Lexden (£371,319), Stanway (£309,215) and Colchester (£273,543).

== Bibliography ==
- ESW (2006). "Abberton Reservoir Expansion Project" (PDF). Essex and Suffolk Water. Archived from the original (PDF) on 5 March 2016.
