= Virley =

Village in Essex, England

Coordinates: 51.789°N 0.826°E

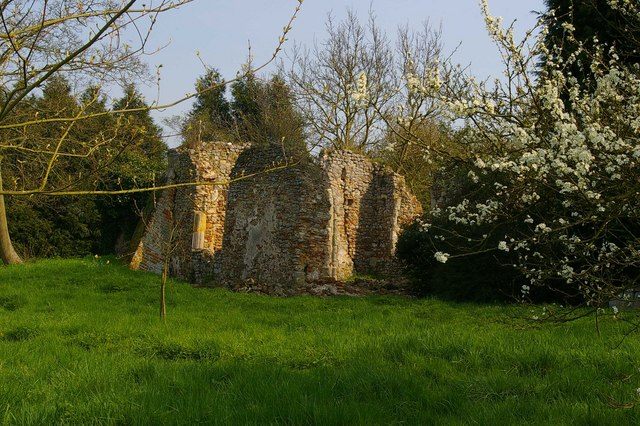
- Ruins of St Mary's Church, destroyed in the 1884 earthquake

- Location within Essex
- Population: 64 (Parish, 2021)
- OS grid reference: TL 950 113
- Civil parish: Virley
- District: Colchester
- Shire county: Essex
- Region: East
- Country: England
- Sovereign state: United Kingdom
- Post town: Maldon
- Postcode district: CM9
- Dialling code: 01621
- Police: Essex
- Fire: Essex
- Ambulance: East of England
- UK Parliament: Witham

Virley is a small village and civil parish in the City of Colchester district of Essex, England. It lies 7 miles (11 km) south of Colchester. Virley closely adjoins the neighbouring village of Salcott, from which it is separated by Virley Brook, also known as Salcott Creek. The two settlements are sometimes described as one village called Salcott-cum-Virley; they have formed a single ecclesiastical parish called Salcott Virley since 1879. At the 2021 census the civil parish of Virley had a population of 64. Virley shares a grouped parish council with the neighbouring parishes of Great and Little Wigborough, Peldon, and Salcott, called the Winstred Hundred Parish Council.

== History ==
In the Domesday Book of 1086 a manor called Salcott was listed in the ownership of a Robert of Verly. By the 14th century a larger village also called Salcott had been established on the opposite of the brook. To distinguish the two, the older Salcott north of the brook became known as Salcott Virley and later just as Virley, whereas the newer Salcott south of the brook became known as Salcott Wigborough, on account of it being in the parish of Great Wigborough. Salcott Wigborough eventually just became known as Salcott.

Virley or Salcott Virley was an ancient parish. Its parish church, dedicated to St Mary, was built in the 13th century. On the other side of the brook, Salcott Wigborough had a chapel of ease to its parish church at Great Wigborough from the 14th century, and subsequently became a separate parish. Salcott Virley and Salcott Wigborough parishes were united for ecclesiastical purposes in 1879, by which time the church at Virley was very dilapidated; it was not used for services after 1879. Five years later, the church at Virley was largely destroyed in the 1884 Colchester earthquake, although some ruins remain.

Although Virley and Salcott have formed a single ecclesiastical parish since 1879, they remain separate civil parishes. They are now both covered by the same grouped parish council, the Winstred Hundred Parish Council, which also covers the neighbouring parishes of Great and Little Wigborough and Peldon.

A local legend holds that a local landowner was trying to build a mansion on the marsh. The Devil showed him firm ground but expected his soul in return. The terrified man said that when he died his coffin should be placed in the wall of Virley church to protect him. It was said the church was marked with the devil's claws until it fell in the earthquake and the devil got his man. Virley also appears in the novel Mehalah: A Story of the Salt Marshes by Sabine Baring-Gould, published in 1880. In chapter 23 there is a description of services in the old church.
