= Langenhoe =

Village in Essex, England

Coordinates: 51.834°N 0.912°E

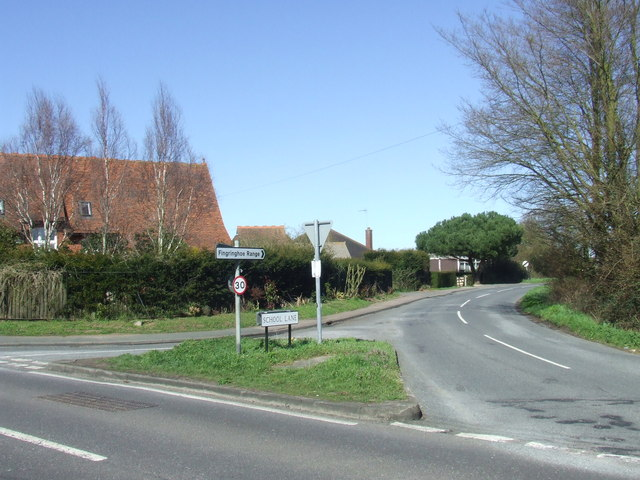
- Junction of School Lane and Mersea Road

- Location within Essex
- Population: 566 (Parish, 2021)
- Civil parish: Langenhoe
- District: Colchester
- Shire county: Essex
- Region: East
- Country: England
- Sovereign state: United Kingdom
- Post town: COLCHESTER
- Postcode district: CO5

Langenhoe is a village and civil parish in the City of Colchester district of Essex, England, located south of Colchester. It shares a grouped parish council with the neighbouring parish of Abberton. The parish boundary between Abberton and Langenhoe follows Mersea Road (the B1025). The two villages now form a single built up area, which the Office for National Statistics calls "Langenhoe and Abberton". At the 2021 census Langenhoe parish had a population of 566, and the Langenhoe and Abberton built up area had a population of 1,015.

The village church was once reputed to be amongst the most haunted buildings in Essex. This ancient church, which had been damaged in the Essex earthquake of 1884, was closed to worship in 1955 and demolished in 1963 after it was deemed structurally unsafe. The ecclesiastical parish of Langenhoe was merged with Abberton in 1961 to form an ecclesiastical parish called "Abberton with Langenhoe". They remain separate civil parishes, although they share a grouped parish council.

The name Langenhoe is from the Old English for ‘long hill-spur’.
