= Peldon =

Village in Essex, England

Coordinates: 51.812°N 0.886°E

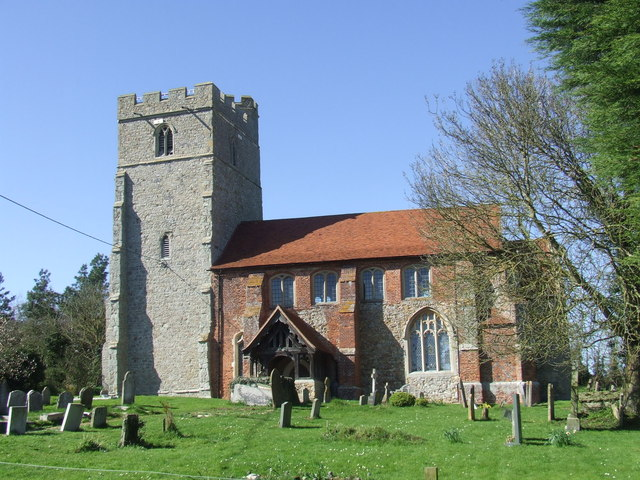
- St Mary's Church, Peldon

- Location within Essex
- Population: 568 (Parish, 2021)
- Civil parish: Peldon
- District: Colchester
- Shire county: Essex
- Region: East
- Country: England
- Sovereign state: United Kingdom
- Post town: Colchester
- Postcode district: CO5
- Police: Essex
- Fire: Essex
- Ambulance: East of England

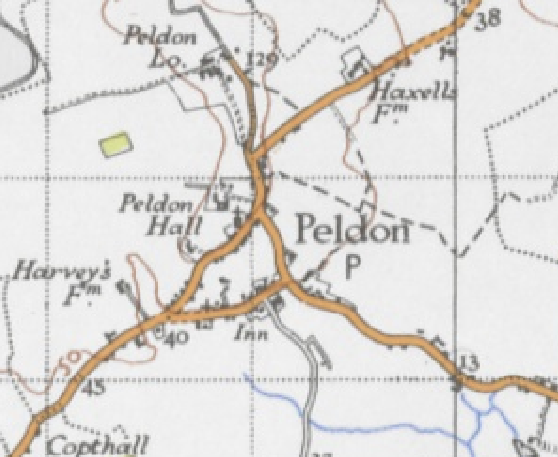
20th-century map of Peldon

Peldon is a village and civil parish in the City of Colchester district of Essex, England. It shares a grouped parish council with the neighbouring parishes of Great and Little Wigborough, Salcott, and Virley, called the Winstred Hundred parish council. Nearby villages include Langenhoe. The parish church is dedicated to St Mary the Virgin and is a Grade I listed building. At the 2021 census the parish had a population of 568.

== History ==
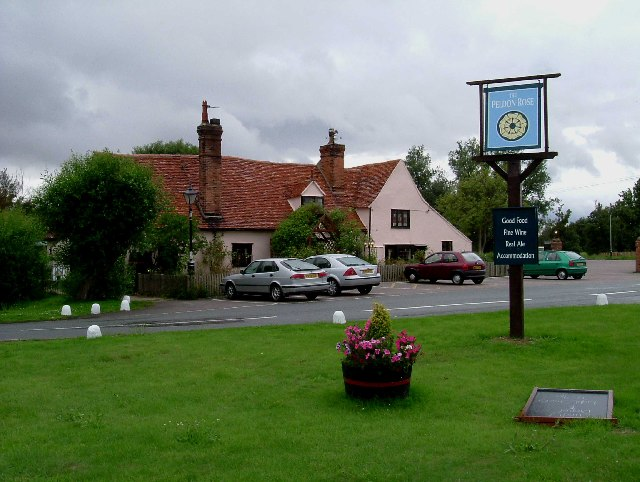
The Peldon Rose inn

During the Iron Age and Roman periods the marshes around Peldon were home to a thriving salt-production industry, and red hills created by this process can be found around the village. Peldon was originally around 2,200 acres of land, equating to approximately 8.9 square kilometres. The manor of Peldon (as opposed to the village) is said to have been established by William the Conqueror in 1086 and was passed on to Sir Thomas Darcy by King Henry VIII. The land was later owned by various local families.

The place-name 'Peldon' is first attested in Anglo-Saxon charters of circa 950 and 995 AD, where it appears as Piltendone and Peltandune respectively. It appears as Peltenduna in the Domesday Book of 1086. The name may mean 'Pylta's hill', from a personal name otherwise unrecorded. The early charters show the village to have been of Saxon origin, and to have predated William the Conqueror by over a century at least.

In 1870-72 John Marius Wilson's Imperial Gazetteer of England and Wales described Peldon as:

"Peldon, a parish and a sub-district in Lexden district, Essex. The parish lies near Mersea Island, 4½ miles S W of Wivenhoe r. station, and 5½ S by W of Colchester; and has a post-office under Colchester. Acres, 2,186. Real property, £3,591. Pop., 501. Houses, 106 The property is much subdivided."

The Colchester earthquake of 22 April 1884 measured 5.1 magnitude on the Richter scale and badly damaged Peldon and much of the area around. The earthquake damaged around 1250 buildings including churches, houses and cottages, and it was reported at the time that every single building in Peldon was damaged in some way, including the local church, causing heavy financial ramifications for the local area. The Peldon Rose, the village's 15th-century inn, rumoured to have been connected by a smugglers' tunnel to nearby Ray Island, still exhibits earthquake damage. In 1984 a village festival was held at Kemps Farm, Peldon, to commemorate the 100th anniversary of the earthquake.

Peldon was also affected by the First World War. On 24 September 1916, German Zeppelin L33 was damaged during a bombing attack on London, and crashed at New Hall Farm, Little Wigborough, only twenty yards from a nearby house. The occupants of the house, the Lewis family, ran for their lives as the airship hit the ground. The crew ran from the craft and, shortly after, it exploded. The crew of the aircraft thought that landing in the sea would be too dangerous, prompting the decision to turn inland.

== Demographics ==
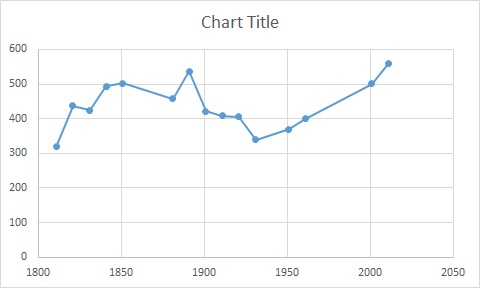
Total population change of Peldon from 1881 to 2011

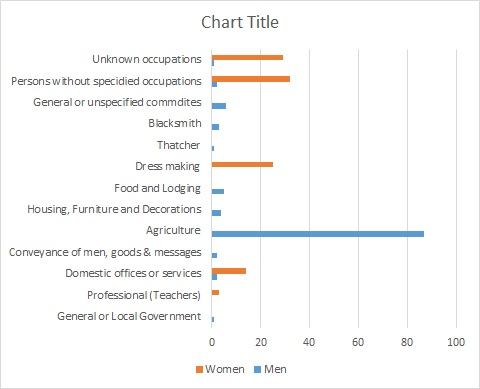
Occupational structure in 1881 in Peldon

According to the 2011 Census there was a population of 559, with 291 males and 268 females. Of these 559 residents, 282 are residents between the ages of 16 and 74 and are in employment. The main source of employment for the population of Peldon is the repair of motor vehicles and motor cycles, with 47 people working in this area of industry. The age structure of Peldon is primarily made up of people over the age of 45, with around 53% of the residents of Peldon being in this age bracket. Of the 422 residents of Peldon that are aged between 16 and 74, only three people are unemployed. This means that 419 residents in this age bracket are employed and economically active, or are economically inactive due to retirement or long-term illness.

The graph captioned "Occupational structure in 1881" shows the huge difference between male and female jobs. Men worked mainly in agriculture, which dominated the occupational structure as farming was the main occupation in many parishes in Britain at this time. However, a large proportion of women in Peldon were occupied in mainly dress making or unknown occupations.

== Church ==
St Mary's Church in Peldon generally dates back to the 11th century, with Anglo-Saxon origins. The nave originates from the 12th century, the tower the 14th century, and the roof from the 16th century. The church tower leans in a southwesterly direction, sometimes supposed to have been caused by the 1884 earthquake. However, the leaning tower was reportedly already leaning when the earthquake occurred; it was noted in the 1880 novel Mehalah, a Story of the Salt Marshes by Sabine Baring-Gould, the rector of East Mersea. The leaning tower was most likely caused by subsidence due to poor ground.

The church has undergone many changes throughout its existence, having been damaged during the 1884 earthquake and undergoing numerous refurbishments throughout the centuries. These refurbishments and improvements continue to this day, with charity work in Peldon taking place to raise money in order to repair and refurbish the church, a Grade I listed building. The registered charity The Friends of St Mary's Peldon raises funds for the church, and has raised over £45,000.

In the 1870s, the parish church was described as: "The church stands on an eminence, with commanding view; is later English, with a tower; and was restored in 1859, and then found to include remains of an early Norman church."

== Notable people ==
- John Ball (c. 1338 – 15 July 1381), English priest who took a prominent part in the Peasants' Revolt of 1381.
- Laurence Fox (1978-) Actor and Far-Right politician, leader of Reclaim Party currently resides in Peldon
