= City of Colchester =

Local government district in North East Essex, England

Coordinates: 51°53′19″N 0°54′13″E

- Non-metropolitan district, borough, city
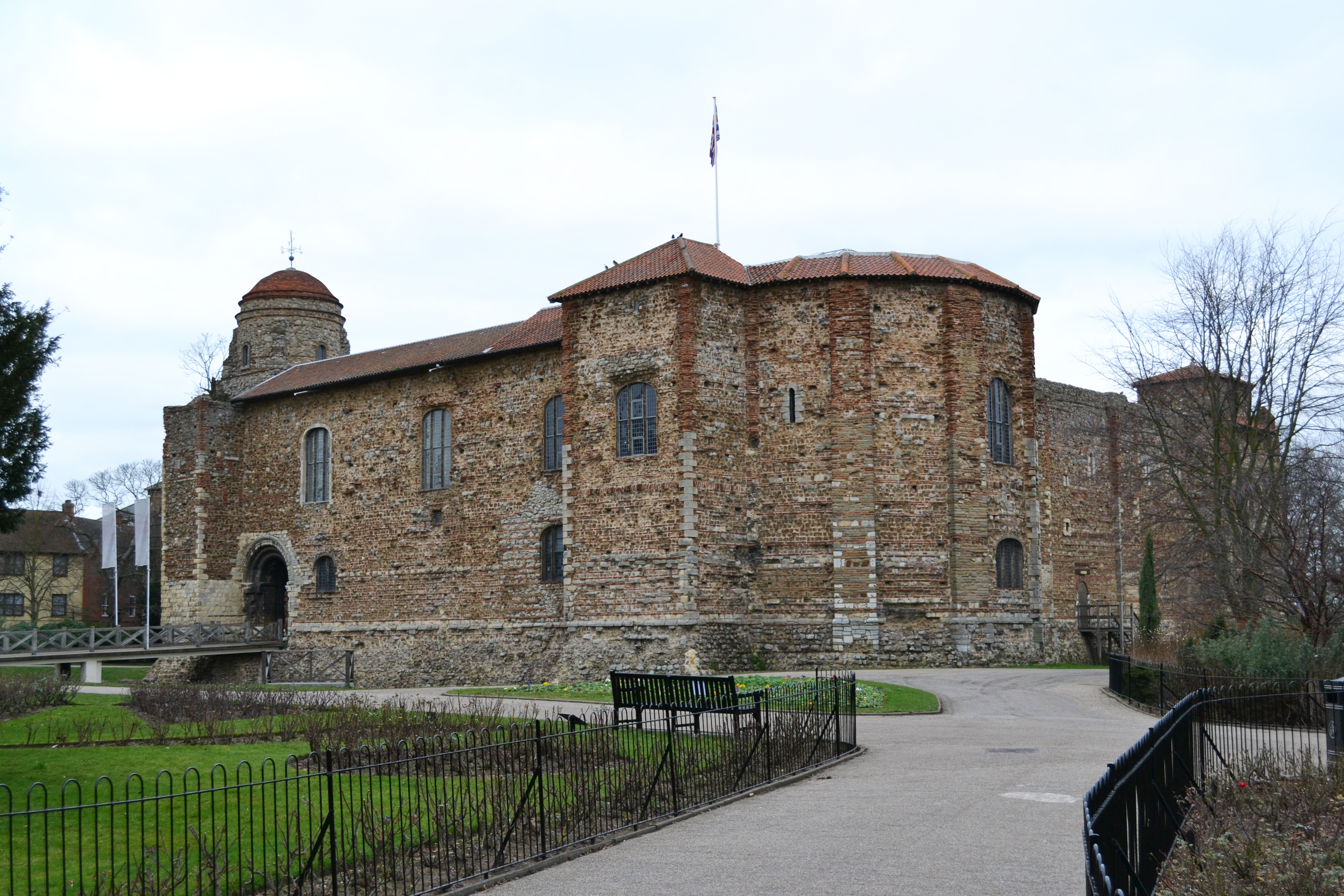
- Colchester Castle

- Coat of arms

- Colchester shown within Essex
- Sovereign state: United Kingdom
- Constituent country: England
- Region: East of England
- Non-metropolitan county: Essex
- Status: Non-metropolitan district, City,
- Admin HQ: Colchester
- Incorporated: 1 April 1974

Government
  - Type: Non-metropolitan district council
  - Body: Colchester City Council
  - Leadership: (No overall control)
  - MPs: Bernard Jenkin, Priti Patel, Pam Cox

Area
  - Total: 128.64 sq mi (333.18 km^{2})
  - Rank: 115th (of 296)

Population (2025)
  - Total: 201,163
  - Rank: 100th (of 296)
  - Density: 1,563.7/sq mi (603.77/km^{2})

Ethnicity (2021)
  - Ethnic groups: List: 87% White; 5.1% Asian; 3.5% Black; 2.9% Mixed; 1.5% Other

Religion (2021)
  - Religion: List: 44.4% Christianity; 44.4% No religion; 9.1% Other; 2.1% Islam
- Time zone: UTC0 (GMT)
  - Summer (DST): UTC+1 (BST)
- ONS code: 22UG (ONS); E07000071 (GSS)
- OS grid reference: TL997254

The City of Colchester is a local government district with city status in Essex, England, named after its main settlement, Colchester. With an estimated population of 200,222 in mid-2024, it is the most populous district in Essex. The district includes the towns of West Mersea and Wivenhoe, with surrounding rural areas stretching from Dedham Vale, on the Suffolk border in the north, to Mersea Island in the Colne Estuary in the south. It borders Tendring District to the east, Maldon District to the south, Braintree District to the west and Babergh District in Suffolk to the north.

== History ==
Colchester was an ancient borough with urban forms of local government from Saxon times. Burgesses were already established by the time of the Domesday survey of 1086. The earliest known borough charter dates from 1189, but that charter appears to confirm pre-existing borough rights rather than being the foundation of a new borough. The borough was reformed in 1836 to become a municipal borough.

The current district was formed on 1 April 1974, under the Local Government Act 1972, covering four former districts which were abolished at the same time:

- Colchester Municipal Borough
- Lexden and Winstree Rural District
- West Mersea Urban District
- Wivenhoe Urban District

The new district was named Colchester after its largest settlement. The new district was awarded borough status from its creation, allowing the chair of the council to take the title of mayor, continuing Colchester's series of mayors.

As part of the Platinum Jubilee of Elizabeth II celebrations in 2022, the borough of Colchester was granted city status, confirmed by Letters Patent dated 5 September 2022, allowing the council to change its name to Colchester City Council.

In March 2026, the government announced that it would abolish the district in 2028 as part of local government reform across Essex. These proposals were withdrawn in September 2026.

== Arms and branding ==
Colchester's Coat of Arms includes several aspects pertaining to its Roman history, and to traditions relating to that period. The bearers are a Roman centurion and an oyster fisherman. It also has elements relating to the myth of St Helena, patron saint of Colchester, having lived in the city during the Roman period.

Some road signs, positioned at the boundary of the unparished areas of the town, describe Colchester as 'Britain's first city' due to it having been a Roman colonia.

== Governance ==
Colchester City Council

Type
- Type: Non-metropolitan district

Leadership
- Mayor: Andrew Ellis, Conservatives, since 27 May 2026
- Leader: Paul Dundas, Conservatives, since 3 June 2026
- Chief Executive: Pamela Donelly since 1 April 2022

Structure
- Seats: 51
- Political groups: Coalition administration Conservative (18) Liberal Democrats (12) Other parties Labour (9) Reform UK (5) Independent (4) Green (3)

Elections
- Last election: 7 May 2026

Meeting place
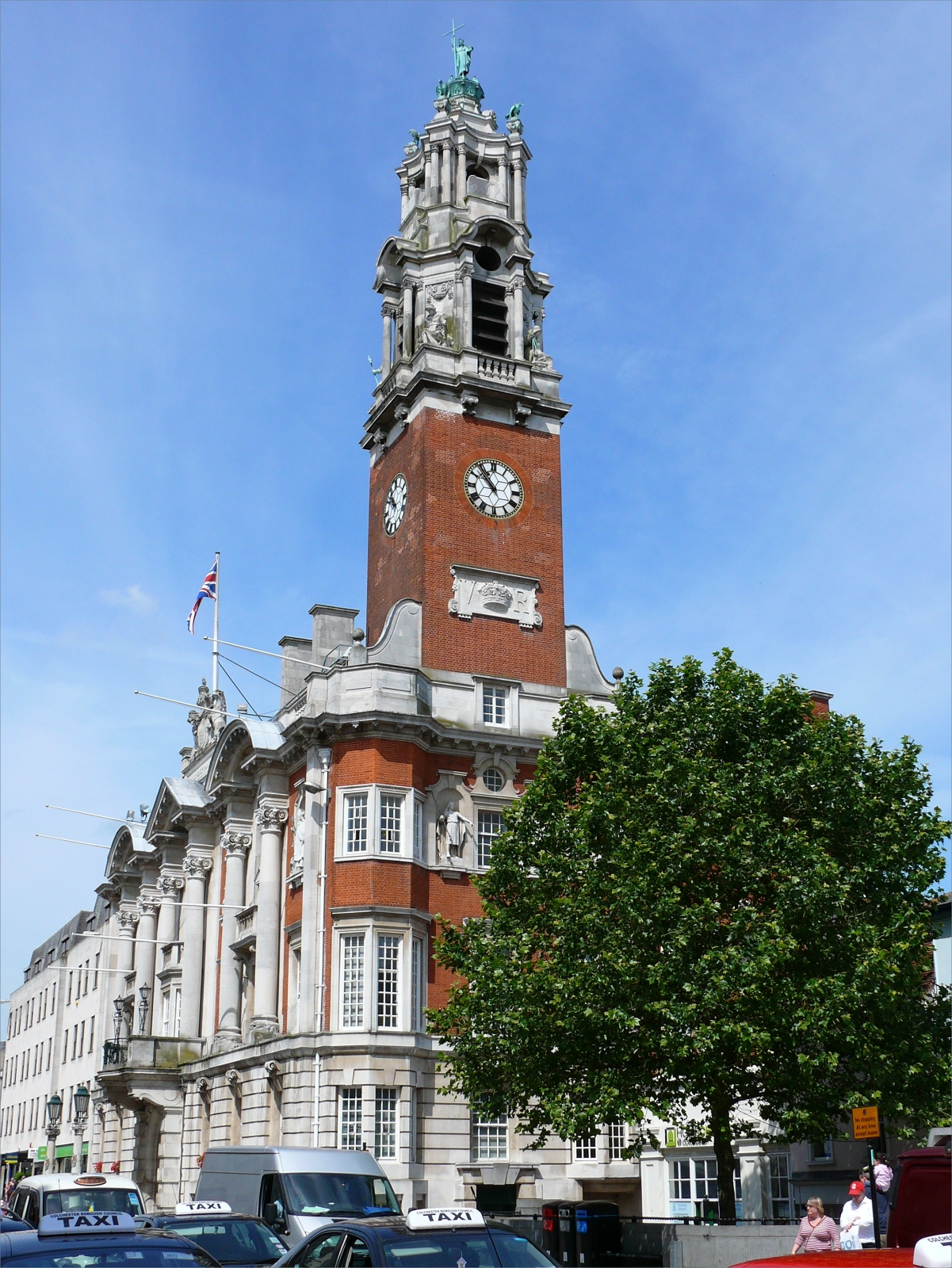
- Town Hall, High Street, Colchester, CO1 1PJ

Website
- www.colchester.gov.uk

Colchester City Council provides district-level services. County-level services are provided by Essex County Council. Parts of the district are also covered by civil parishes, which form a third tier of local government.

=== Political control ===
The council has been under no overall control since 2008. A Conservative Party and Liberal Democrats coaliation administration was formed in June 2026, which replaces an earlier LibDem/Labour Party coalition that had been in place since May 2025. Between the 2023 election and the new coalition forming in 2025, the council had been run by a Liberal Democrat minority administration with informal support from the Labour Party and the Green Party on a case-by-case basis.

The first election to the borough council, following the reforms of the Local Government Act 1972, was held in 1973, initially operating as a shadow authority alongside the outgoing authorities until the new arrangements came into effect on 1 April 1974. Political control of the council since 1974 has been as follows:

Party in control	Years
No overall control	1974–1976
Conservative	1976–1986
No overall control	1986–1994
Liberal Democrats	1994–1998
No overall control	1998–2007
Conservative	2007–2008
No overall control	2008–present

=== Leadership ===
The role of mayor is largely ceremonial in Colchester. Political leadership is instead provided by the leader of the council. The leaders since 2000 have been:

Councillor	Party	From	To
Bill Frame	Liberal Democrats	2000	2002
Colin Sykes	Liberal Democrats	2002	2004
John Jowers	Conservative	2004	2006
Robert Davidson	Conservative	2006	2008
Anne Turrell	Liberal Democrats	2008	Jun 2014
Martin Hunt	Liberal Democrats	16 June 2014	May 2015
Paul Smith	Liberal Democrats	27 May 2015	May 2018
Mark Cory	Liberal Democrats	23 May 2018	May 2021
Paul Dundas	Conservative	26 May 2021	May 2022
David King	Liberal Democrats	22 May 2022	June 2026
Paul Dundas	Conservative	3 June 2026	

=== Composition ===
Following the 2026 council elections and a subsequent change of allegiance later in May 2026, the composition of the council was:

Party	Councillors
Conservative	18
Liberal Democrats	12
Labour	9
Reform	5
Independent	4
Green	3
Total	51

The independent councillors form the Progressive Independent Alliance.

=== Premises ===
The council meets at Colchester Town Hall on the High Street. The current building was completed in 1902 on a site which had been occupied by Colchester's main civic buildings since 1277.

Most of the council's administrative offices are at a modern office building called Rowan House at 33 Sheepen Road, north-west of the city centre.

== Elections ==
Since the last boundary changes in 2016 the council has comprised 51 councillors representing 17 wards, with each ward electing three councillors. Elections are held three years out of every four, choosing one councillor for each ward at a time to serve a four-year term. In the fourth year of the cycle when there are no elections to the city council, elections for Essex County Council are held instead.

== Demography ==
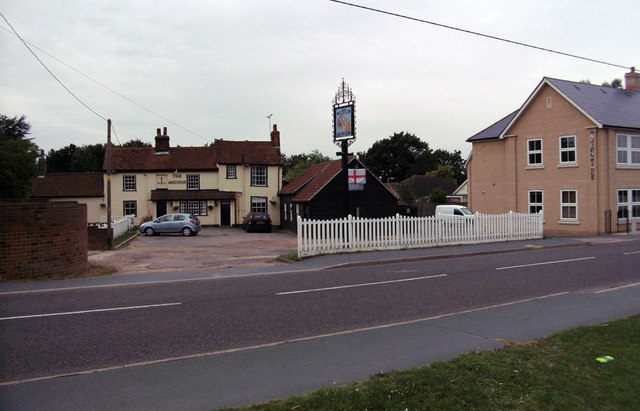
Tiptree, one of the outlying settlements of the City of Colchester District

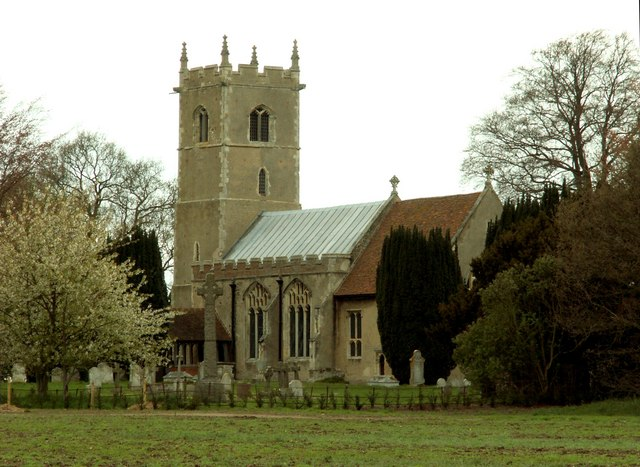
Great Horkesley, one of the many outlying villages of the City of Colchester District

In 2008, Colchester had a population of approximately 181,000. Average life expectancy was 78.7 for males and 83.3 for females. By the time of the 2021 census, the population had risen to 192,700.

At the previous census, in 2011, 92% of the population was White (87.5% British, 0.7% Irish and 3.8% Other White), Asians were the second largest group making up 3.6% (0.8% Indian, 0.2% Pakistani, 0.2% Bangladeshi and 1% Chinese, other 1.4%), Black people constituted 1.4% (0.3% Caribbean, 1% African, 0.1% other), those of mixed race made up 1.8%, 0.6% were Arab and there were 0.4% from other ethnic groups. 57.7% identified themselves as Christian, while 31.4% had no affiliation to a religion. Of other religions, 1.6% identified as Muslim, 0.7% Hindu, 0.6% Buddhist, 0.2% Jewish, 0.1% Sikh, 0.5% others and 7.3% did not answer.

== Parishes ==
There are 35 civil parishes in the district; the former Colchester Municipal Borough is an unparished area (subject to some adjustments since 1974 to that area's boundaries with neighbouring parishes). The parish councils of Wivenhoe and West Mersea take the style "town council". Some of the smaller parishes are grouped together to share a parish council: Abberton and Langenhoe Parish Council covers those two parishes, and the Winstred Hundred Parish Council covers the four parishes of Great and Little Wigborough, Peldon, Salcott, and Virley. The two parishes of Layer Breton and Layer Marney have parish meetings rather than parish councils due to their small populations.

- Abberton
- Aldham
- Birch
- Boxted
- Chappel
- Copford
- Dedham
- East Donyland
- East Mersea
- Eight Ash Green
- Fingringhoe
- Fordham
- Great and Little Wigborough
- Great Horkesley
- Great Tey
- Langenhoe
- Langham
- Layer Breton
- Layer de la Haye
- Layer Marney
- Little Horkesley
- Marks Tey
- Messing-cum-Inworth
- Mount Bures
- Myland
- Peldon
- Salcott
- Stanway
- Tiptree
- Virley
- Wakes Colne
- West Bergholt
- West Mersea (town)
- Wivenhoe (town)
- Wormingford
