= Grade II* listed buildings in Colchester (borough) =

There are over 20,000 Grade II* listed buildings in England. This page is a list of these buildings in the district of Colchester in Essex.

== List of buildings ==
Name	Location	Type	Completed (Note: The date given is the date used by Historic England as significant for the initial building or that of an important part in the structure's description.)	Date designated	Grid ref. (Note: The grid reference is based on the British national grid reference system, sometimes known as OSGB36, used by the Ordnance Survey.) Geo-coordinates	Entry number (Note: The "List Entry Number" is a unique number assigned to each listed building and scheduled monument by Historic England.)	Image
Church of St Andrew	Abberton	Church	14th century	7 April 1965	TL9974419386; 51°50′14″N 0°53′52″E	1110914	Church of St Andrew More images
Aldham Hall	Aldham	House	Early 17th century	23 June 1952	TL9184924860; 51°53′21″N 0°47′11″E	1306270	Upload Photo
Barn to north-east of Hoe Farmhouse	Aldham	Barn	c.1500	27 January 1982	TL9061325774; 51°53′52″N 0°46′09″E	1170078	Upload Photo
Church of St Margaret and St Catherine	Aldham	Church	1854	7 April 1965	TL9176325844; 51°53′53″N 0°47′09″E	1170063	Church of St Margaret and St Catherine More images
The Old House	Aldham	House	1751	7 April 1965	TL9202226996; 51°54′30″N 0°47′25″E	1337411	Upload Photo
Threshers	Aldham	House	Later 16th century	7 April 1965	TL9203826983; 51°54′30″N 0°47′25″E	1110885	Upload Photo
Church of St Mary (ruin) North of Birch Hall	Birch	Church	12th century	23 June 1952	TL9500720770; 51°51′05″N 0°49′48″E	1110898	Church of St Mary (ruin) North of Birch Hall More images
Badcocks Farmhouse	Copford	Farmhouse	Late 15th century	23 June 1952	TL9004321086; 51°51′22″N 0°45′29″E	1239073	Upload Photo
Easthorpe Hall	Copford	House	17th century	23 June 1952	TL9116621513; 51°51′34″N 0°46′29″E	1273949	Upload Photo
St Mary's Grange	Copford	House	Late 15th century	23 June 1952	TL9161521602; 51°51′36″N 0°46′53″E	1239072	Upload Photo
Brook House	Dedham	Jettied house	16th century	23 June 1952	TM0583333190; 51°57′33″N 0°59′40″E	1239284	Brook House More images
Dale Brook	Dedham	House	c.1780	23 June 1952	TM0582133190; 51°57′33″N 0°59′39″E	1239313	Dale Brook More images
Essex Rose Cafe	Dedham	Jettied house	15th/16th century	23 June 1952	TM0575433196; 51°57′33″N 0°59′36″E	1239326	Essex Rose Cafe More images
Gould House	Dedham	House	18th century	23 June 1952	TM0581033187; 51°57′33″N 0°59′39″E	1273803	Gould House More images
Great House	High Street, Dedham	House	1937–38	6 July 1981	TM0557733100; 51°57′30″N 0°59′26″E	1239335	Great House More images
House and shop occupied by F R Spearing next to Shermans	Dedham	House	18th century	23 June 1952	TM0571333173; 51°57′32″N 0°59′33″E	1273804	Upload Photo
Ivy House	Dedham	House	1767	23 June 1952	TM0573733181; 51°57′33″N 0°59′35″E	1239286	Ivy House More images
Knights Manor	Dedham	Manor house	16th century	23 June 1952	TM0613332234; 51°57′01″N 0°59′53″E	1273808	Upload Photo
Le Talbooth	Gun Hill, Dedham	Jettied house	16th century	22 November 1967	TM0421933464; 51°57′44″N 0°58′16″E	1239265	Le Talbooth More images
Loom House & Marlborough Head Inn	Dedham	Houses	Later	23 June 1952	TM0578633184; 51°57′33″N 0°59′37″E	1239285	Loom House & Marlborough Head Inn More images
Rye Farmhouse	Dedham	Farmhouse	c.1400	27 January 1982	TM0473031516; 51°56′40″N 0°58′38″E	1239440	Upload Photo
Shakespeare House	Dedham	House	Later	23 June 1952	TM0565733151; 51°57′32″N 0°59′30″E	1239331	Shakespeare House More images
Sheldrakes	Dedham	House	18th century	7 April 1965	TM0566333132; 51°57′31″N 0°59′31″E	1239317	Upload Photo
The Sun Public House	Dedham	Jettied house	14th century	23 June 1952	TM0568233174; 51°57′32″N 0°59′32″E	1273783	The Sun Public House More images
Vale Bakery	Dedham	Bakery	Late medieval	7 April 1965	TM0562133123; 51°57′31″N 0°59′28″E	1239332	Vale Bakery More images
1 High Street	Dedham	Timber-framed house	18th century	23 June 1952	TM0584433191; 51°57′33″N 0°59′40″E	1239312	Upload Photo
Barnards Farmhouse	Fordham	Farmhouse	14th century	27 January 1982	TL9198627322; 51°54′41″N 0°47′23″E	1239874	Upload Photo
Wash Farmhouse	Fordham	Farmhouse	13th century	27 January 1982	TL9190627384; 51°54′43″N 0°47′19″E	1239836	Upload Photo
Church of St Nicholas	Little Wigborough, Great and Little Wigborough	Church	15th century	7 April 1965	TL9809114540; 51°47′40″N 0°52′16″E	1223007	Church of St Nicholas More images
Church of St Stephen	Great Wigborough, Great and Little Wigborough	Church	14th century	7 April 1965	TL9680715640; 51°48′17″N 0°51′11″E	1223003	Church of St Stephen More images
Chapel Cottage	Great Horkesley	House	15th century	23 June 1952	TL9772130967; 51°56′31″N 0°52′31″E	1222607	Chapel Cottage More images
Cockerills	Great Horkesley	Cross-wing house	14th century	7 April 1965	TL9772831610; 51°56′52″N 0°52′32″E	1222741	Upload Photo
Gulls Farmhouse	Great Tey	Farmhouse	15th century	27 January 1982	TL8715024732; 51°53′23″N 0°43′06″E	1267431	Upload Photo
The Hall	Langham	House	c.1740	27 January 1982	TM0322233656; 51°57′51″N 0°57′24″E	1223465	Upload Photo
Valley House	Langham	House	17th century	23 June 1952	TM0199634291; 51°58′13″N 0°56′21″E	1223746	Upload Photo
Layer Breton Hall	Layer Breton	House	Mid-18th century	27 January 1982	TL9486517131; 51°49′08″N 0°49′33″E	1267120	Upload Photo
Duke's Farmhouse	Layer Marney	Farmhouse	16th century	23 June 1952	TL9305918267; 51°49′47″N 0°48′01″E	1267081	Duke's Farmhouse More images
Wick Farmhouse	Layer Marney	Cross-wing house	15th century	27 January 1982	TL9308517484; 51°49′21″N 0°48′01″E	1223989	Upload Photo
Blind Knights	Layer-de-la-Haye	House	Early 15th century	18 May 1979	TL9763219069; 51°50′07″N 0°52′02″E	1267086	Upload Photo
Malting Green House	Layer-de-la-Haye	House	Early 18th century	27 January 1982	TL9756119950; 51°50′35″N 0°52′00″E	1223909	Malting Green House More images
Holt's Farmhouse	Little Horkesley	Farmhouse	c. 1750 (frontage)	27 January 1982	TL9479131125; 51°56′40″N 0°49′58″E	1223990	Upload Photo
King's Farmhouse	Little Horkesley	Farmhouse	15th century or earlier	7 April 1965	TL9629631698; 51°56′57″N 0°51′18″E	1224018	King's Farmhouse More images
Little Horkesley Hall	Little Horkesley	House	18th century	27 January 1982	TL9599931868; 51°57′03″N 0°51′02″E	1267036	Upload Photo
Old Josselyns	Little Horkesley	House	Modern	23 June 1952	TL9639232612; 51°57′26″N 0°51′25″E	1266816	Old Josselyns More images
The Priory	Little Horkesley	Farmhouse	17th century	27 January 1982	TL9607431991; 51°57′07″N 0°51′07″E	1224435	Upload Photo
Westwood Park	Little Horkesley	Country house	17th century	27 January 1982	TL9619529988; 51°56′02″N 0°51′09″E	1267009	Upload Photo
Barn south of Marks Tey Hall	Marks Tey	Barn	c.1400	27 January 1982	TL9168123306; 51°52′31″N 0°46′59″E	1224577	Upload Photo
Barn to south-west of Little Tey House	Marks Tey	Aisled barn	16th century	27 January 1982	TL8928924405; 51°53′10″N 0°44′57″E	1266779	Upload Photo
Church of All Saints	Messing, Messing-cum-Inworth	Church	13th century	7 April 1965	TL8968518930; 51°50′12″N 0°45′07″E	1224665	Church of All Saints More images
Messing Park	Messing Park, Messing-cum-Inworth	House	Early 18th century	7 April 1965	TL8939318026; 51°49′43″N 0°44′50″E	1224649	Upload Photo
Games Farmhouse	Peldon	Farmhouse	Early 15th century	27 January 1982	TL9879516278; 51°48′35″N 0°52′56″E	1266661	Upload Photo
Church of St Mary	Salcott cum Virley	Church	14th century	7 April 1965	TL9519713590; 51°47′13″N 0°49′43″E	1224767	Church of St Mary More images
Beaconhead Farmhouse	Stanway	Farmhouse	14th century	27 January 1982	TL9530024803; 51°53′15″N 0°50′11″E	1224842	Beaconhead Farmhouse More images
Catchbells	Stanway	House	c.1500	27 January 1982	TL9411224407; 51°53′04″N 0°49′09″E	1224841	Catchbells More images
Church of All Saints	Stanway	Church	Late 13th century	16 June 1999	TL9532022056; 51°51′46″N 0°50′07″E	1266610	Church of All Saints More images
Olivers	Stanway	House	17th century	7 April 1965	TL9670721437; 51°51′25″N 0°51′18″E	1224900	Upload Photo
Parish Church of St Albright	Stanway	Parish church	12th century	7 April 1965	TL9403924318; 51°53′01″N 0°49′05″E	1224899	Parish Church of St Albright More images
Church of All Saints	Wakes Colne	Parish church	Norman	7 April 1965	TL8896628605; 51°55′26″N 0°44′48″E	1225059	Church of All Saints More images
Normans Farmhouse	Wakes Colne	Farmhouse	c.1300	27 January 1982	TL8865530347; 51°56′23″N 0°44′35″E	1225019	Upload Photo
Old House	Wakes Colne	House	17th century	27 January 1982	TL8975029170; 51°55′43″N 0°45′30″E	1225029	Old House More images
Watch House	Wakes Colne	Open hall house	c.1520	27 January 1982	TL8957128540; 51°55′23″N 0°45′20″E	1224980	Watch House More images
Cooks Hall	West Bergholt	House	16th century	27 January 1982	TL9500527364; 51°54′38″N 0°50′01″E	1225091	Cooks Hall More images
High Trees Farmhouse	West Bergholt	Farmhouse	Early 15th century	23 June 1952	TL9590728276; 51°55′07″N 0°50′50″E	1225133	Upload Photo
Horsepits Farmhouse	West Bergholt	Farmhouse	16th century or earlier	23 June 1952	TL9543927112; 51°54′30″N 0°50′23″E	1266529	Upload Photo
The Hall	West Bergholt	House	18th century	7 April 1965	TL9523728060; 51°55′01″N 0°50′15″E	1266531	The Hall More images
Yew Tree House, gate and gatepiers	West Mersea	House	Early 18th century	11 October 1949	TM0084012476; 51°46′30″N 0°54′35″E	1266512	Upload Photo
The Church of St Mary	Wivenhoe	Parish church	Mid-14th century	3 May 1949	TM0389921524; 51°51′18″N 0°57′34″E	1225318	The Church of St Mary More images
Jenkins Farmhouse	Wormingford	Farmhouse	16th century	23 June 1952	TL9308130723; 51°56′29″N 0°48′27″E	1225427	Jenkins Farmhouse More images
Rochfords	Wormingford	House	16th century	23 June 1952	TL9329730373; 51°56′18″N 0°48′38″E	1225428	Upload Photo
Church of St James the Great	Colchester	Church	13th to 15th century	24 February 1950	TM0016525238; 51°53′23″N 0°54′27″E	1307051	Church of St James the Great More images
Church of St Michael	Berechurch	Bell tower	14th century	24 February 1950	TL9928521888; 51°51′36″N 0°53′34″E	1123672	Church of St Michael More images
Church of St Peter	Colchester	Church	Early 15th century	24 February 1950	TL9943525240; 51°53′24″N 0°53′48″E	1123570	Church of St Peter More images
Colchester Club	Colchester	House	Mid-18th century	24 February 1950	TL9992825170; 51°53′21″N 0°54′14″E	1337710	Colchester Club More images
Column and street light, left of entrance to Town Hall	Colchester	Column	c.1898	8 September 1993	TL9958525213; 51°53′23″N 0°53′56″E	1230447	Column and street light, left of entrance to Town Hall More images
Column and street light, right of entrance to Town Hall	Colchester	Column	c.1898	8 September 1993	TL9959425215; 51°53′23″N 0°53′57″E	1230446	Column and street light, right of entrance to Town Hall More images
Employment Exchange	Colchester	House	Early 18th century	2 December 1971	TL9964825319; 51°53′26″N 0°54′00″E	1337704	Employment Exchange More images
Essex and Suffolk Fire Office	Colchester	Corn exchange	1820	24 February 1950	TL9943725211; 51°53′23″N 0°53′48″E	1306789	Essex and Suffolk Fire Office More images
Former Church of St Leonard at the Hythe	Hythe	Church	12th century	24 February 1950	TM0128024719; 51°53′05″N 0°55′24″E	1123578	Former Church of St Leonard at the Hythe More images
Former Church of St Martin	Colchester	Church	Early 12th century (origin)	2 December 1971	TL9961025347; 51°53′27″N 0°53′58″E	1337393	Former Church of St Martin More images
Garrison Church	Colchester Garrison	Military chapel	1856	2 December 1971	TM0039524387; 51°52′55″N 0°54′37″E	1123564	Garrison Church More images
Grey Friars	Colchester	House	18th century	24 February 1950	TM0005725268; 51°53′24″N 0°54′21″E	1123611	Grey Friars More images
Headgate Court, Colchester	Colchester	Courtyard	16th–17th century	24 February 1950	TL9936025041; 51°53′18″N 0°53′44″E	1337707	Headgate Court, Colchester More images
Municipal Water Tower ("Jumbo")	Colchester	Water tower	1882	2 December 1971	TL9932125182; 51°53′22″N 0°53′42″E	1123669	Municipal Water Tower ("Jumbo") More images
Rear wing of the Old Siege House	Colchester	House	Early 19th century	2 December 1971	TM0072825326; 51°53′25″N 0°54′56″E	1123628	Rear wing of the Old Siege House More images
Summerhouse at Number 74 (the Minories)	Colchester	Summerhouse	Mid-18th century	19 February 1959	TM0001325176; 51°53′21″N 0°54′18″E	1123608	Summerhouse at Number 74 (the Minories) More images
The George Hotel	Colchester	House	17th century	24 February 1950	TL9973525258; 51°53′24″N 0°54′04″E	1123614	The George Hotel More images
The Marquis of Granby Inn	Colchester	Inn	Early 16th century	24 February 1950	TL9941125469; 51°53′32″N 0°53′48″E	1123534	The Marquis of Granby Inn More images
The Minories	Colchester	House	Later 18th century	24 February 1950	TM0000925230; 51°53′23″N 0°54′18″E	1123607	The Minories More images
The Scheregate	Colchester	Timber-framed house	17th century	24 February 1950	TL9962125012; 51°53′16″N 0°53′58″E	1337769	The Scheregate More images
The Siege House	Colchester	House	Early 16th century	19 February 1959	TM0073825318; 51°53′25″N 0°54′57″E	1123627	The Siege House More images
Tymperleys	Colchester	House	15th–16th century	24 February 1950	TL9957325084; 51°53′19″N 0°53′55″E	1169553	Tymperleys More images
Wivenhoe House	Wivenhoe Park	Country house	1759	1 June 1973	TM0327524120; 51°52′43″N 0°57′07″E	1225229	Wivenhoe House More images
3–5 West Stockwell Street	Colchester	Timber-framed house	Late 15th century	19 February 1959	TL9960225278; 51°53′25″N 0°53′57″E	1110922	3–5 West Stockwell Street More images
29–31 West Stockwell Street	Colchester	Timber-framed house	c.1600	24 February 1950	TL9954225466; 51°53′31″N 0°53′54″E	1110929	29–31 West Stockwell Street
54 Head Street	Colchester	House	1774	24 February 1950	TL9943225035; 51°53′17″N 0°53′48″E	1123596	54 Head Street
11A and 11B High Street	Colchester	House	17th century	24 February 1950	TL9948925169; 51°53′22″N 0°53′51″E	1123597	11A and 11B High Street
71 Culver Street	Colchester	House	18th century	24 February 1950	TL9994225169; 51°53′21″N 0°54′15″E	1123644	71 Culver Street More images
20 and 22 Crouch Street	Colchester	House	Mid-18th century	24 February 1950	TL9927524953; 51°53′15″N 0°53′39″E	1123643	20 and 22 Crouch Street
9 and 10 East Hill	Colchester	Town house	Early Georgian	24 February 1950	TM0027325224; 51°53′22″N 0°54′32″E	1123650	9 and 10 East Hill More images
60 North Hill	Colchester	House	17th century	24 February 1950	TL9938425270; 51°53′25″N 0°53′46″E	1169334	60 North Hill
6 Trinity Street	Colchester	House	18th century	1 August 1968	TL9959525105; 51°53′20″N 0°53′56″E	1337771	6 Trinity Street More images
13–15 North Hill	Colchester	Shop	Later 19th century	24 February 1950	TL9942025377; 51°53′29″N 0°53′48″E	1337776	13–15 North Hill More images
58-62 Head Street, 17 Sir Isaac's Walk	Colchester	Cellar	Late 17th century (medieval cellar)	24 February 1950	TL9943525012; 51°53′17″N 0°53′48″E	1337728	58-62 Head Street, 17 Sir Isaac's Walk More images
Colchester War Memorial	Colchester	War memorial	1923	7 July 2006	TL9992525247; 51°53′24″N 0°54′14″E	1391704	Colchester War Memorial More images

== See also ==
- Grade I listed buildings in Essex
- Grade II* listed buildings in Essex
  - Grade II* listed buildings in Basildon (district)
  - Grade II* listed buildings in Braintree (district)
  - Grade II* listed buildings in Brentwood (borough)
  - Grade II* listed buildings in Castle Point
  - Grade II* listed buildings in Chelmsford (borough)
  - Grade II* listed buildings in Epping Forest (district)
  - Grade II* listed buildings in Harlow
  - Grade II* listed buildings in Maldon (district)
  - Grade II* listed buildings in Rochford (district)
  - Grade II* listed buildings in Southend-on-Sea
  - Grade II* listed buildings in Tendring
  - Grade II* listed buildings in Thurrock
  - Grade II* listed buildings in Uttlesford
- Churches in Colchester
