= Bernard Mason =

British publisher

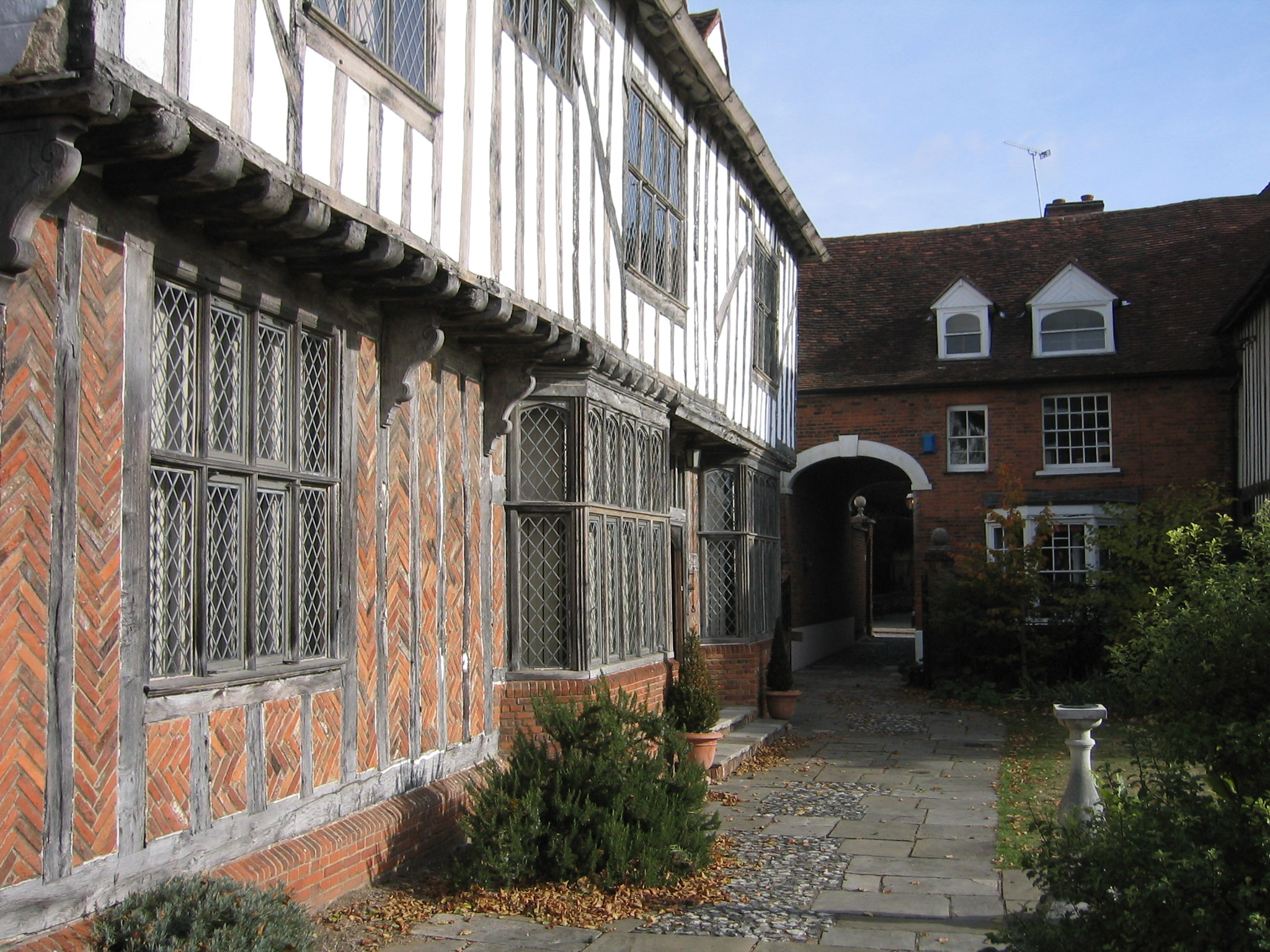
Tymperleys

Bernard Mason OBE (12 September 1895 – 29 April 1981) was a prominent Colchester businessman and philanthropist who was born in Ipswich but lived his whole life in Colchester. He was the proprietor of Mason's printing firm from which he retired as director in 1962.

Mason began collecting Colchester-made clocks in 1927 and bequeathed the collection to the town, along with his home "Tymperleys" (the former mansion of Elizabethan scientist Dr William Gilberd). Mason was a Freeman of the Worshipful Company of Clockmakers and the author of "Clock and Watchmaking in Colchester" (1969) which originally cost four guineas (£4 4s. 0d.; £4.20). He was made an OBE in 1959. Mason claimed that there are 375 known examples of Colchester clocks and he managed to collect 216 of them in his lifetime, travelling far and wide to bring them back "home".

Tymperleys once housed the Mason Collection as part of the Colchester Clock Museum. The museum closed in 2011 and some of the clocks went on display in the nearby Hollytrees Museum, where they remain to this day. The remaining clocks are still within the museum collection, cared for at their stores. The collection comprises 203 clocks and 14 watches made in Colchester from the 17th to 19th centuries. Significant items include a lantern clock from 1645 by William Bacon, and a mantel clock from 1725 by Nathaniel Hedge.

Bernard Mason was in charge of air raid warnings throughout Colchester district during World War II.

== Personal life ==
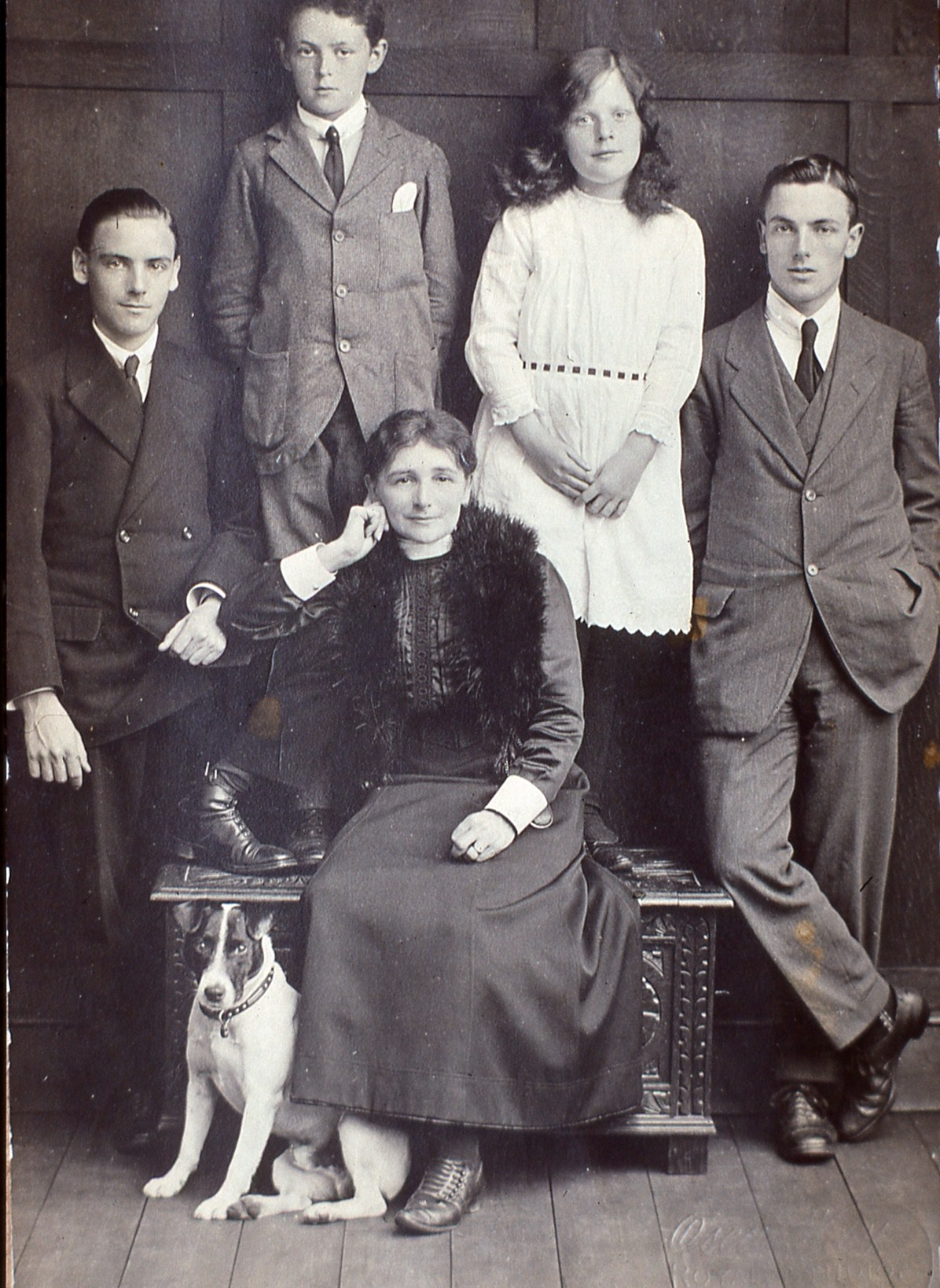
Family picture of the Mason family

Mason was born in Felixstowe, to Ernest Nathan Mason, an engineer's draughtsman and Bertha Betsey Mason (née Kitton), and had two brothers, Eudo and Conrad and a younger sister Helena. Mason's father had worked for Paxmans, before developing a method of making photographic blueprints from engineering drawings and setting up his own firm E.N. Mason and Sons Ltd. Mason married Evelyn Lily Franklin in Colchester in 1927.

Mason's younger brother Eudo Mason (1901–69) was a scholar and professor of German literature.

== Bibliography ==
- 1969 - Clock and Watchmaking in Colchester England ISBN 978-0600430759
