= Nathaniel Hedge =

English clockmaker

Nathaniel Hedge III (1710–1795) was an English clockmaker based in Colchester in Essex.

Hedge was apprenticed to the Colchester clockmaker John Smorthwaite in 1728 and married Smorthwaite's daughter Sarah in 1733. Hedge went on to become a prosperous and highly respected clockmaker.

Examples of Hedge's work can be found in the Mason collection at the Colchester Clock Museum.
