= Old St Mary's Church, West Bergholt =

Coordinates: 51.9171°N 0.8384°E

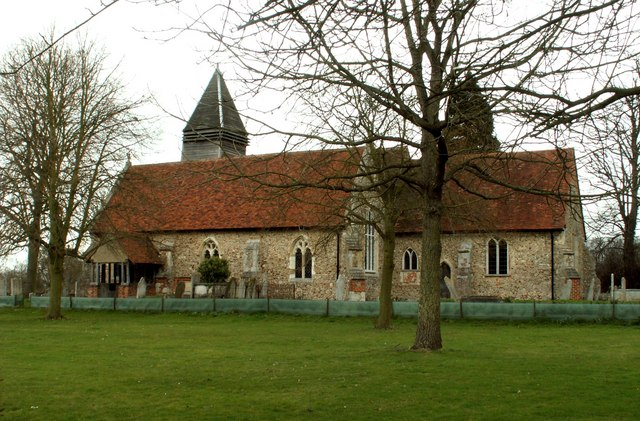
- Old St Mary's Church, West Bergholt, from the south

- Location in Essex
- OS grid reference: TL 954 281
- Location: West Bergholt, Essex
- Country: England
- Denomination: Anglican
- Website: Churches Conservation Trust

History
- Dedication: Saint Mary

Architecture
- Functional status: Redundant
- Heritage designation: Grade I
- Designated: 7 April 1965
- Architectural type: Church
- Style: Anglo-Saxon, Gothic
- Closed: 1904

Specifications
- Materials: Indurated conglomerate Tiled roofs

Old St Mary's Church is a redundant Anglican church in the village of West Bergholt, Essex, England. It is recorded in the National Heritage List for England as a designated Grade I listed building, and is under the care of the Churches Conservation Trust. It stands at a distance from the village, close to West Bergholt Hall.

== History ==
Excavation has shown that the oldest part of the church is Anglo-Saxon, its north wall dating from about 1000. At this time there was an apse at the east end, but this was later converted into a square-ended chancel. The chancel was extended in about 1300. During the 14th century the south aisle with its three-bay arcade was added. When the bellcote was added in two phases during the medieval era, timber originally from the west end of the church, was used in its construction.

During the following centuries there was a population shift, and by the late 19th century most people were living at a distance from the church. Due to this, and because the fabric of the church had deteriorated, it was decided to build a new church, also dedicated to Saint Mary, nearer to its congregation. This was dedicated on 12 August 1904. The old church was declared redundant in 1975 and was vested in the Churches Conservation Trust the following year.

Queen Elizabeth I had to step in twice to sort out problems with the village vicars. The first troublesome vicar was Reverend Edmund Tarrell, who was noted for spending too much time in the public houses and not enough time in the Church. The Queen has to intervene after it was reported that the vicar had failed to turn up to evensong and failing to give a woman her last rites as he was in a Colchester pub and could not be found. He most serious offence, which he managed to escape, was not reading out King Henry VIII's latest religious doctrine, which carried the penalty of death. Later in 1581, it was reported to the Queen that the village's vicar, Reverend Richard Kyrby, refused to conduct the service in English after the introduction of her new Prayer Book, which he claimed should remain in Latin. Sixteen years later the Queen stepped in and had him removed.

In 1650, Reverend Gregory Holland was called before the Committee for Scandalous Ministers for preaching Royalist sermons during the Civil War, along with drunkenness and swearing in Church. The result of this hearing was that he was allowed to continue in his post as vicar at Bergholt, but that the parishioners elect him a curate, who would pay him the majority of his stipend.

It was not only the vicars that were in trouble, but in 1556 a member of the parish, Agrees George, was out of favour with Queen Mary, for refusing to attend church until the service was no longer conducted in the Roman Catholic tradition. She was then tried before the Bishop of London, Reverend Edmund Bonner, along with 12 others. During her time at Newgate Prison she wrote a letter attacking the Pope for being the Anti-Christ and that she was baptised in Christ's Church not Rome. She was burned at Stratford before 20,000 people.

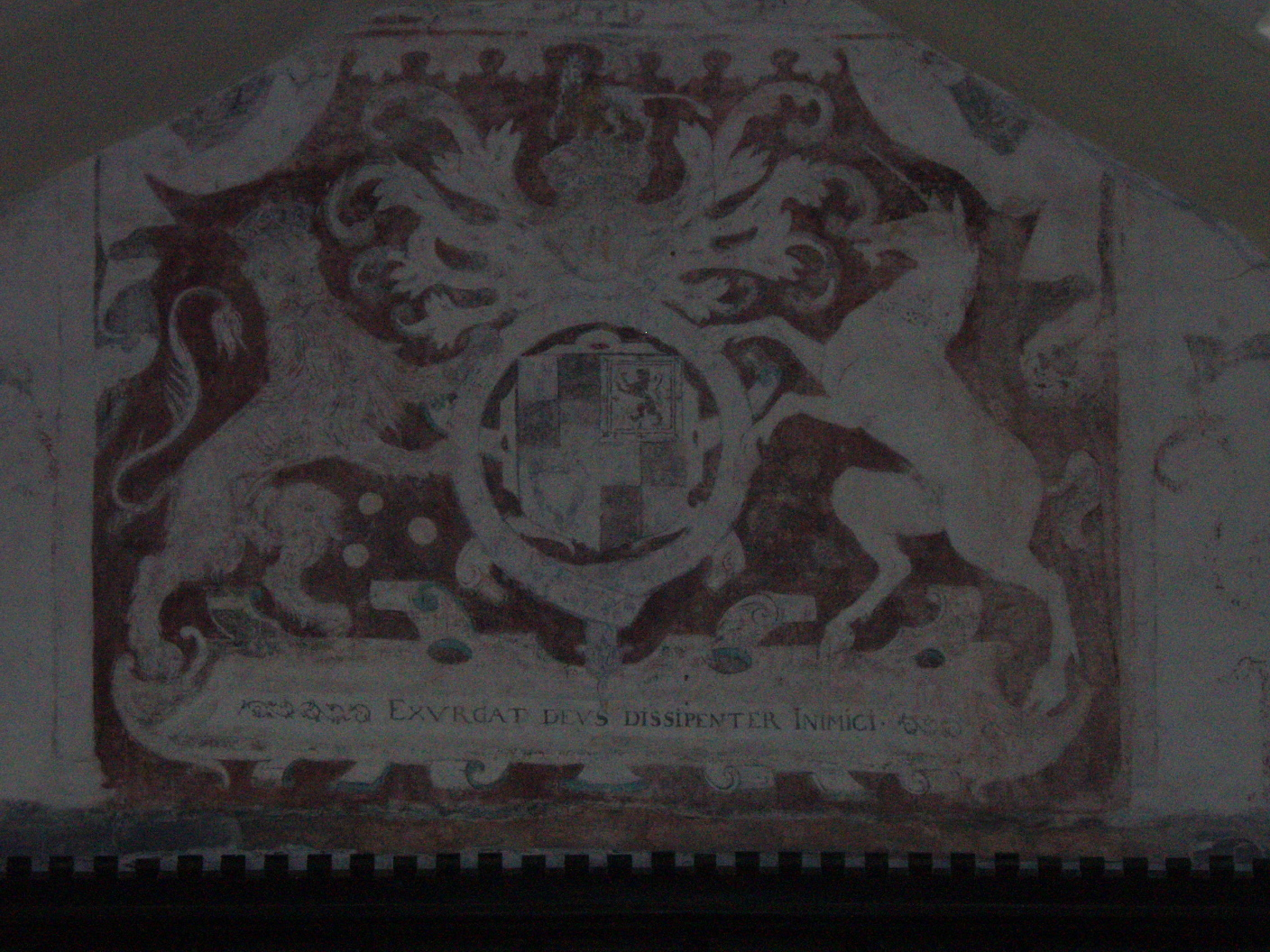
James I's Royal Coat in St Mary's Church

Later on, in order to remind all the villagers who was king, King James I had his royal coat of arms painted in the Church. This coat of arms can still be seen to this day if one stands in the gallery and looks towards the altar. The motto on the arms reads "Exurgat Deus Dissipenter Ininice", this is the opening line of Psalm 68 (Let God arise and let His enemies be scattered). Opposite James' arms is a set of Hanoverian arms acquired in 1816.

== Architecture ==
The church is constructed in indurated conglomerate and has tiled roofs. The porch is of timber on a brick plinth. Romanesque carved stones have been re-used in the walls of the present church. Its plan consists of a three-bay nave with a south aisle and a south porch, a chancel, and a bellcote at the west end. The windows in the chancel have Y-tracery, while the tracery in the windows of the south aisle is curvilinear.

Internally the roof is supported by massive tie-beams, and the ceilings are plastered. At the west end is a gallery on two Ionic columns, with a panelled front and an entablature with triglyphi. In the southeast of the aisle is a piscina with a trefoil head. The font consists of a cylindrical bowl on a square stem. There is also a royal coat of arms from the Jacobean era.

== See also ==
- List of churches preserved by the Churches Conservation Trust in the East of England
