= Jumbo Water Tower =

Victorian water tower in Colchester, England

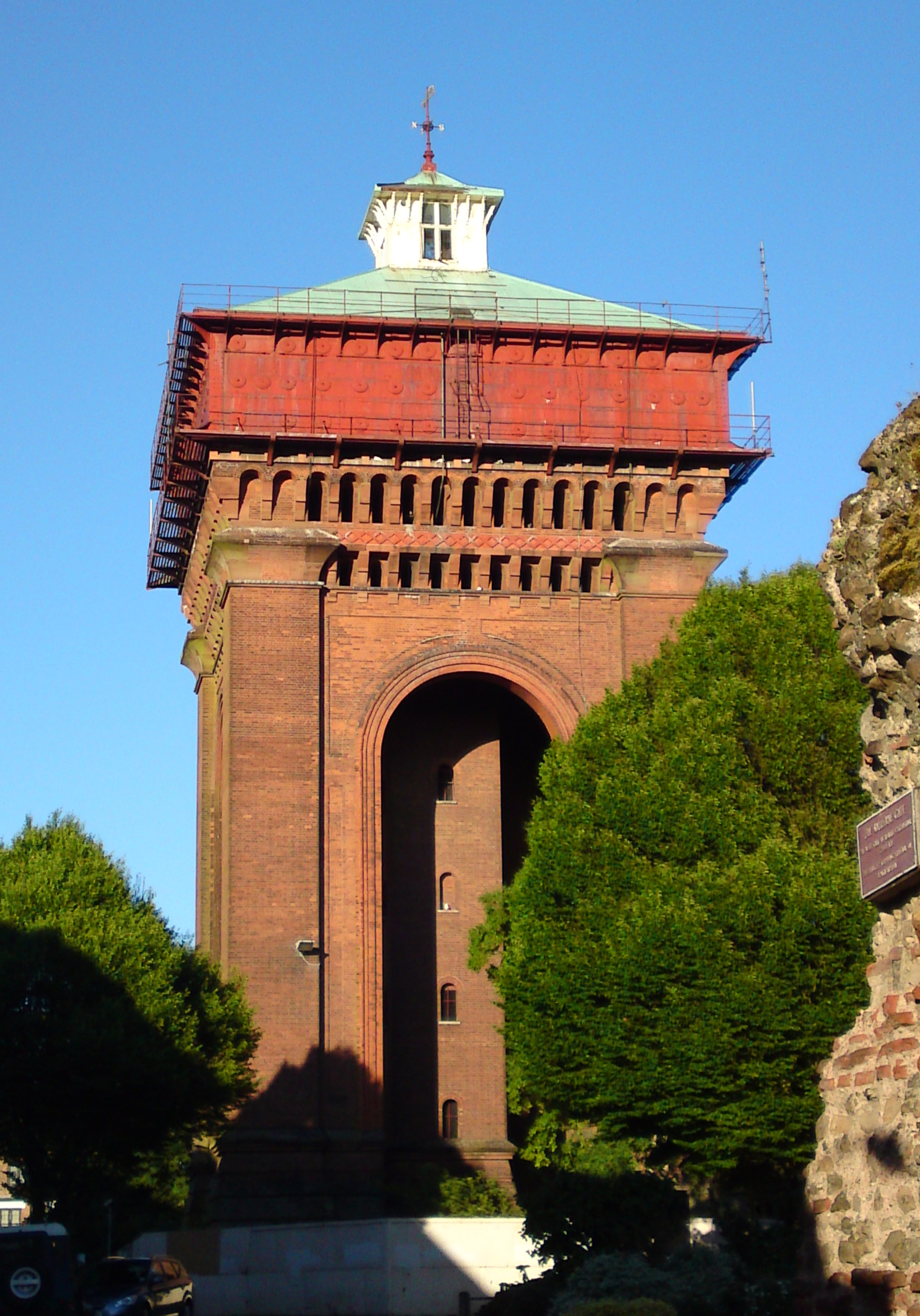
- Jumbo Water Tower photographed from the west in 2011
- Interactive map of the Jumbo Water Tower area

General information
- Location: Balkerne Gate, Colchester, Essex, England
- Year built: 1882–3
- Opened: 1883

Design and construction
- Designations

Listed Building – Grade II*
- Official name: Municipal Water Tower (Jumbo)
- Designated: 2 December 1971
- Reference no.: 1123669

Jumbo Water Tower is a water tower at the Balkerne Gate in Colchester, Essex, and the largest water tower in the UK. Charles Clegg (c. 1855 – c. 1904), the Borough Surveyor and Engineer, designed the structure. The tower is 40.1 metres (132 ft) tall overall and contains 1.2 million red bricks. The tower was nicknamed 'Jumbo' after the London Zoo elephant as a term of derision in 1882 by Reverend John Irvine, who was annoyed that the tower dwarfed his nearby rectory at St Mary-at-the-Walls.

== Construction and design ==
Construction took around 20 months and was completed in 1883. 1,200,000 bricks and 819 tons of stone and cement were used in the construction of the tower. The tank is constructed of cast-iron bolted panels and when it was in use could hold 1,069 cubic metres (37,800 cubic ft) of water. It was claimed at the time to be the second-largest water tower in England.

Inside the central pier are 157 steps to a cupola which at 35.37 metres (116.0 ft) above ground offers views a long way over Colchester and the surrounding area.

It was Grade II* listed in 1971.

== Post use history ==
After a century of service the water tower became superfluous to the water supply system and was sold off by Anglian Water in 1987. It has had multiple owners since. In 2001 after prolonged controversy permission was granted on appeal to replace the tank with a glass walled penthouse, but work on this never started and permission expired. In 2006 at the height of the UK property boom, Jumbo was sold at auction for £330,000 to a local developer. In 2008 a local charity, the Balkerne Tower Trust, was formed with the aim of restoring the Grade II* listed tower and making it a heritage attraction with guided public access.

In September 2011, a subsequent planning application to convert the tower into a penthouse, flats and restaurant was rejected by Colchester Borough Council by 7 votes to 5. Further planning applications in 2013 were also refused, and the building was put up for sale in May 2014, selling for £190,000 at auction to local poultry farmer Paul Flatman. A scheme devised by North Essex Heritage, a Building Preservation Trust, to construct a restaurant, gift shop and heritage centre within the tower was set back in July 2018 when an application for a Heritage Lottery Fund grant was turned down.

In December 2021, the tower was leased by Paul Flatman to North Essex Heritage for a 150-year term. The Trust plans to adapt the tower to house a restaurant, visitor experience and historical interpretation space. In April 2024, comedian Griff Rhys Jones, also the President of The Victorian Society, gave his support to the restoration project.

in January 2025 North Essex Heritage received an £8,000,000 grant from the National Lottery Heritage Fund towards the restoration of the water tower. This was followed by a £200,000 donation from the Garfield Weston Foundation in March 2025. Planning consent was received in February 2025 with work set to commence later the same year following the appointment of Sir Robert McAlpine as the lead contractor.

== See also ==
- Grade II* listed buildings in Colchester (borough)
- Tower Hill Water Tower, a water tower of similar design in Ormskirk, Lancashire
