= Eudo Mason =

German scholar

- Born: 26 September 1901; Colchester, United Kingdom
- Died: 10 June 1969 (aged 67) near Peebles, United Kingdom

Academic background
- Education: University of Leipzig (PhD)
- Thesis: Lebenshaltung und Symbolik bei Rainer Maria Rilke (1938)

Eudo Colecestra Mason (26 September 1901 – 10 June 1969) was a German scholar. He was a professor of German at Edinburgh University, joining in 1946 and becoming Chair of German in 1951, a position he held until his death in 1969, only the third person to take the role since 1919. He had previously worked as a lecturer in Münster, Leipzig, and Basel.

Mason attended school in Cambridge, before studying at both the University of Cambridge and University of Oxford completing his Doctorate in Leipzig. His thesis on Austrian-Bohemian poet Rainer Maria Rilke was published in 1938. Mason was seen as the principal scholar in the revival of Henry Fuseli. In 1967 Mason won the Friedrich Gundolf Prize. His final works, Holderlin and Goethe:3 was published posthumously in 1975.

In 2004, the Chair of German at the University of Edinburgh was renamed the Eudo C. Mason Chair of German.

== Personal life ==
Mason was born in Colchester, Essex on 29 September 1901 to Ernest Nathan Mason, an engineer's draughtsman and Bertha Betsey Mason (née Kitton), and had two older brothers, Bernard and Conrad and a younger sister Helena. Mason's father had worked for Paxmans, before developing a method of making photographic blueprints from engineering drawings and setting up his own firm E.N. Mason and Sons Ltd. Mason married Esther Klara Giesecke in Colchester in 1939, however he outlived her as she died in 1966.

Mason received a service of remembrance on 1 August 1969 at the University of Edinburgh's Chaplaincy Centre. The executors of Mason's will donated his collection of over 3,600 children' books in English, French and German to the National Library of Scotland.

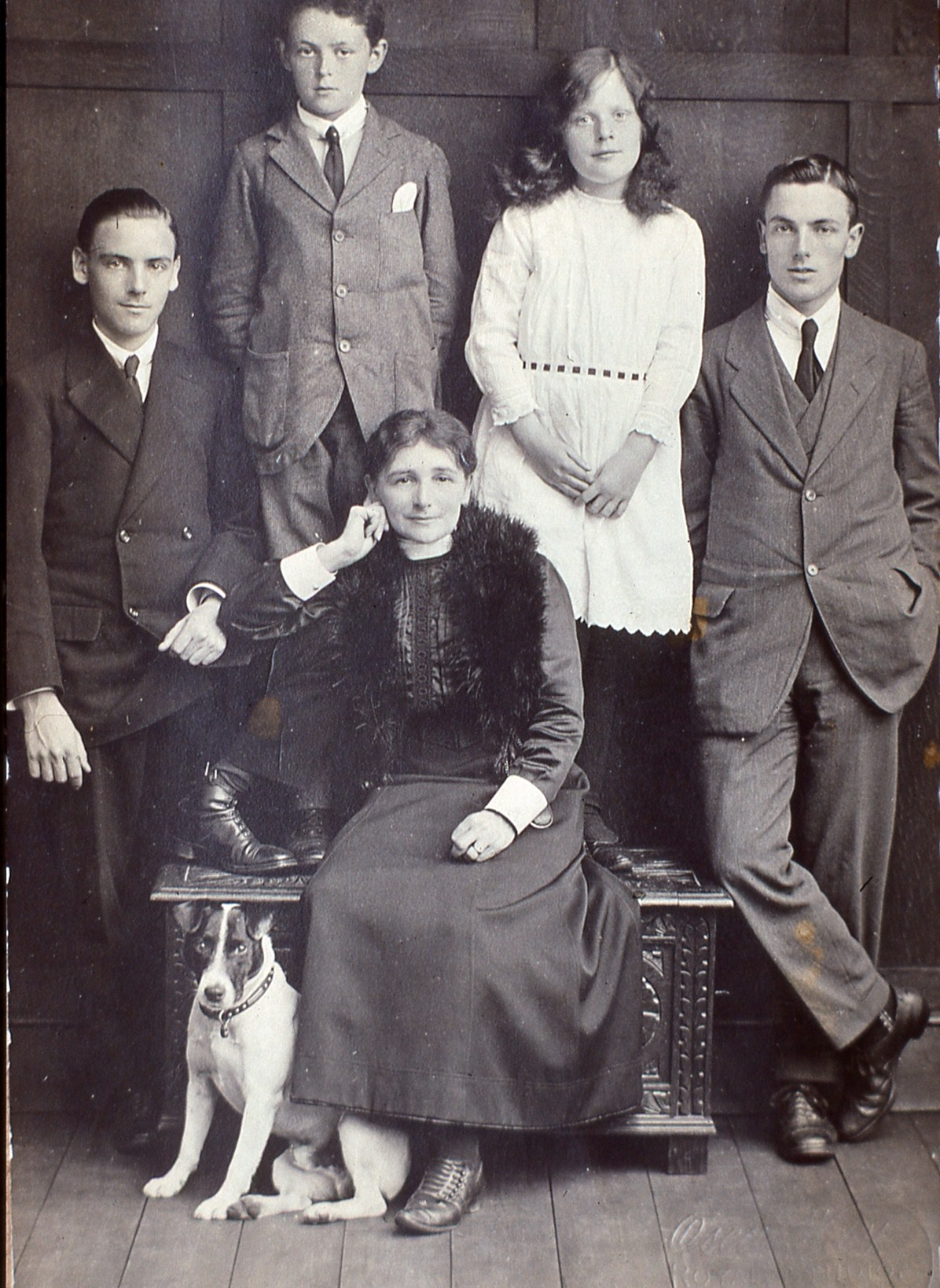
Family picture of the Mason family

== Bibliography ==
- 1938 Rilke's apotheosis: a survey of representative recent publications on the work and life of R.M. Rilke
- 1951 The Mind of Henry Fuseli : selections from his writings ASIN B0000CHWF5
- 1951 Chinese Poetry Paper by the Masters of the Ten Bamboo Hall (Author - Jan Tschichold, Translator - Eudo C. Mason)
- 1958 Rilke und Goethe
- 1959 Deutsche und englische Romantik: Eine Gegenüberstellung ASIN B00B3MH5FM
- 1961 Rilke, Europe, and the English-Speaking World ISBN 978-0-521-05687-8
- 1963 Exzentrische Bahnen: Studien zum Dichterbewubsein der Neueit ASIN B00BGGQANI
- 1963 Rilke ISBN 978-0-05-001422-6
- 1963 A Miscellany Of German And French Poetry ASIN B0010IIA6C
- 1964 RAINER MARIA RILKE, Sein Leben und sein Werk ASIN B000L2ANPE
- 1968 Goethe's "Faust": Its Genesis and Purport ISBN 978-0-520-00821-2
- 1975 Holderlin and Goethe: 3 (Britische und Irische Studien zur Deutschen Sprache und Literatur/British and Irish Studies in German Language and Literature) ISBN 978-3-261-01410-8

== Articles ==
- 1951 Reviews of Book: Lessings Dramen; Erworbenes Erbe The Downside Review 1 July 1951
- 1954 RILKE'S CORRESPONDENCE WITH BENVENUTA AND ERIKA MITTERER - German Life and LettersVolume 7, Issue 3, April 1954
- 1966 RILKE'S EXPERIENCE OF INSPIRATION AND HIS CONCEPTION OF "ORDNEN" - Modern Language Studies, Volume II, Issue 4, October 1966, Pages 335–346
