= Wormingford =

Village in Essex, England

Coordinates: 51.9581°N 0.8194°E

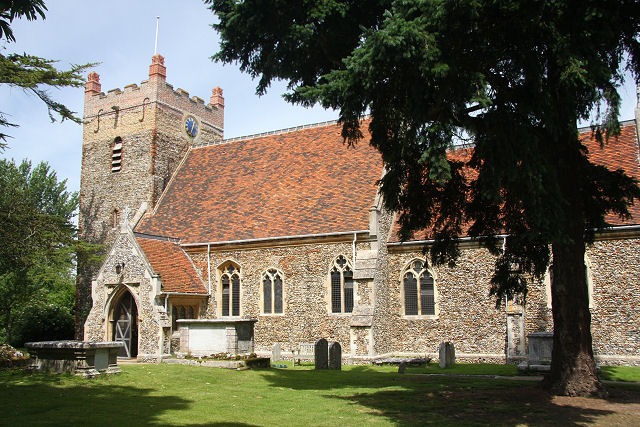
- St Andrew's Church, Wormingford

- Location within Essex
- Population: 450 (Parish, 2021)
- OS grid reference: TL938325
- Civil parish: Wormingford
- District: Colchester
- Shire county: Essex
- Region: East
- Country: England
- Sovereign state: United Kingdom
- Post town: COLCHESTER
- Postcode district: CO6
- Dialling code: 01787
- Police: Essex
- Fire: Essex
- Ambulance: East of England
- UK Parliament: North Essex

Wormingford is a village and civil parish in the City of Colchester district of Essex, England. At the 2021 census the parish had a population of 450.

The ancient parish of Wormingford on the south bank of the River Stour, 6 miles (9.7 km) north- west of Colchester and 8 miles (13 km) south-east of Sudbury, Suffolk, covered 2,322 acres (929 hectares). The Stour forms the northern boundary, and the eastern, southern, and western ones follow mainly field boundaries, but sometimes cut through fields. Detached fields totalling 15 acres (61,000 m^{2}) in Little Horkesley, were transferred to that parish in 1889.

Wormingford has a post office and a public house and restaurant called The Crown.

Most of the parish lies on a relatively high plain which drains northwards to the River Stour and southwards to the River Colne. From the Stour the ground rises southwards to reach a height of more than 225 ft (70 m) in the south-west. A band of alluvium runs beside the Stour and there are river terrace deposits south of that, then, as the ground rises, bands of London clay, and sands and gravels. Most of the higher south part of the parish is boulder clay, good farming land, with a small pocket of sands and gravels running south-east from Wood Hall.

The main road from Colchester to Bures and Sudbury (B1508) runs from south-east to north-west across the parish. Minor roads connected the parish with Assington (Suffolk) across Wormingford bridge, with Fordham, and with Little Horkesley and Nayland (Suffolk). Other minor roads and tracks and a network of footpaths link the scattered farms and houses.

The ford from which the parish takes its name (originally 'Withermund's ford') was probably that in the river Stour by the watermill, at the bottom of Church Road, where there is a sand bank in the middle of the river. A ford further east near Garnons has also been suggested, but seems less likely. The Church Road ford was replaced before 1802 by a bridge, called a horse-bridge in 1812. About 1821 Messrs Jones, who leased the river tolls, built a new bridge, apparently a narrow wooden footbridge. It collapsed in the winter of 1895–6 and was replaced by an iron bridge in 1898.

The modern form of the place name, recorded from 1254, gave rise to three stories of dragons, ('worm' meaning serpent or dragon). The first story says the village is the location where the patron saint of England, St George, killed his dragon; a mound in the village is said to cover the body of the legendary dragon. The second, also unsubstantiated, is that a crocodile escaped from Richard I of England's menagerie in the Tower of London and caused much damage in Wormingford before being killed by Sir George Marney; a stained-glass window in St Andrew's Church depicts this legend. The third, written in 1405 by John de Trokelowe, a monk, told of a dragon who threatened Richard Waldegrave's territory near Sudbury but fled into the Mere when pursued.

A large number of scattered archaeological finds from all periods from the Neolithic suggest that settlement was first on the flood plain, alongside the Stour, before woodland on the higher ground further south was gradually cleared. Prehistoric tools were found in the complex of ring ditches and other crop marks near the mere in the north-west of the parish (see below); when a Bronze Age barrow nearby was destroyed in 1836 'hundreds of urns in rows' were found.

The artist John Constable of East Bergholt (1776–1837), had Wormingford associations, his relatives farming at Wormingford Hall and Gernons. John Nash who lived at the Elizabethan yeoman's house, Bottengoms, painted in and around the village from 1929 until 1977. The author Ronald Blythe inherited Bottengoms from Nash, who had bought the house in 1944. Blythe wrote a column, "Word from Wormingford", in the Church Times from 1993 to 2017.

The Church of England parish church, St Andrew's, is a Grade I listed building.

== Wormingford Mere ==
Wormingford Mere lies next to the River Stour and covers an area of 49,000 square metres (12 acres). It is a 12,000-year-old natural feature known as a kettle hole. A study in 1981 by the University of Cambridge found that the water is 6 metres (20 ft) deep, below which is 14 metres (46 ft) of mud. An analysis of a 4 centimetres (1.6 in) core of sediment found 9,000-year-old pollen at 14 metres (46 ft) which showed that the landscape at that time was primarily hazel and birch with some elm. Colchester Archaeological Group says that the mere's "relationship to its surrounding features [including crop marks, see above] is striking" and that it might "have played some role in ceremonial activity", perhaps being seen as "an entrance to the spirit underworld".

== Wormingford airfield ==
Originally a relief airfield for biplanes in the First World War, the airfield was expanded by Richard Costain Ltd and a number of sub-contractors during the period 1942/43. Earmarked for an Eighth Heavy Bomb Group, nothing ever came of this and at the end of November 1943 the yet to be completed station was handed to the Ninth Air Force for use by one of its Fighter Groups. On 30 November, the 362nd Fighter Group arrived at Wormingford.

The Group was assigned to the 70th Fighter Wing. It did not fly its first mission until 8 February 1944. Its operational status at Wormingford was a short one and they left on 8 April 1944. During its stay, the 362nd mounted over 30 missions, losing five aircraft.

The next group to move in was the 55th Fighter Group with its P-38 Lightnings from Nuthampstead in Hertfordshire. The 55th's role as a fighter group was to be a short one due to some of the disadvantages of the aircraft. However, the 55th later become renowned for ground strafing and ground attack bombing. On D-Day, the P-38 groups were given the task of acting as convoy escorts for the armada of ships moving to and from Normandy. The 55th was selected to serve with the occupation forces in Germany and in July 1945 it left Wormingford for Gielbelstadt airfield in Bavaria. The old airfield is now used by the Essex and Suffolk Gliding Club.

== Wormingford sports clubs ==
The football club Wormingford Wanderers, commonly known as ‘The Worms’, are an amateur football club based in Wormingford Essex. The teams compete in Division 3 North of the Essex and Suffolk Border league, The club was founded in 1922 and play on the Wormingford playing fields off Robletts Way, moves are afoot to build a statue of modern day Worms legend 'Brillo' after his recent retirement and many years of class service to the club who not only holds the club record for most appearances, but also the record for scoring two own goals and receiving a red card in the same game.

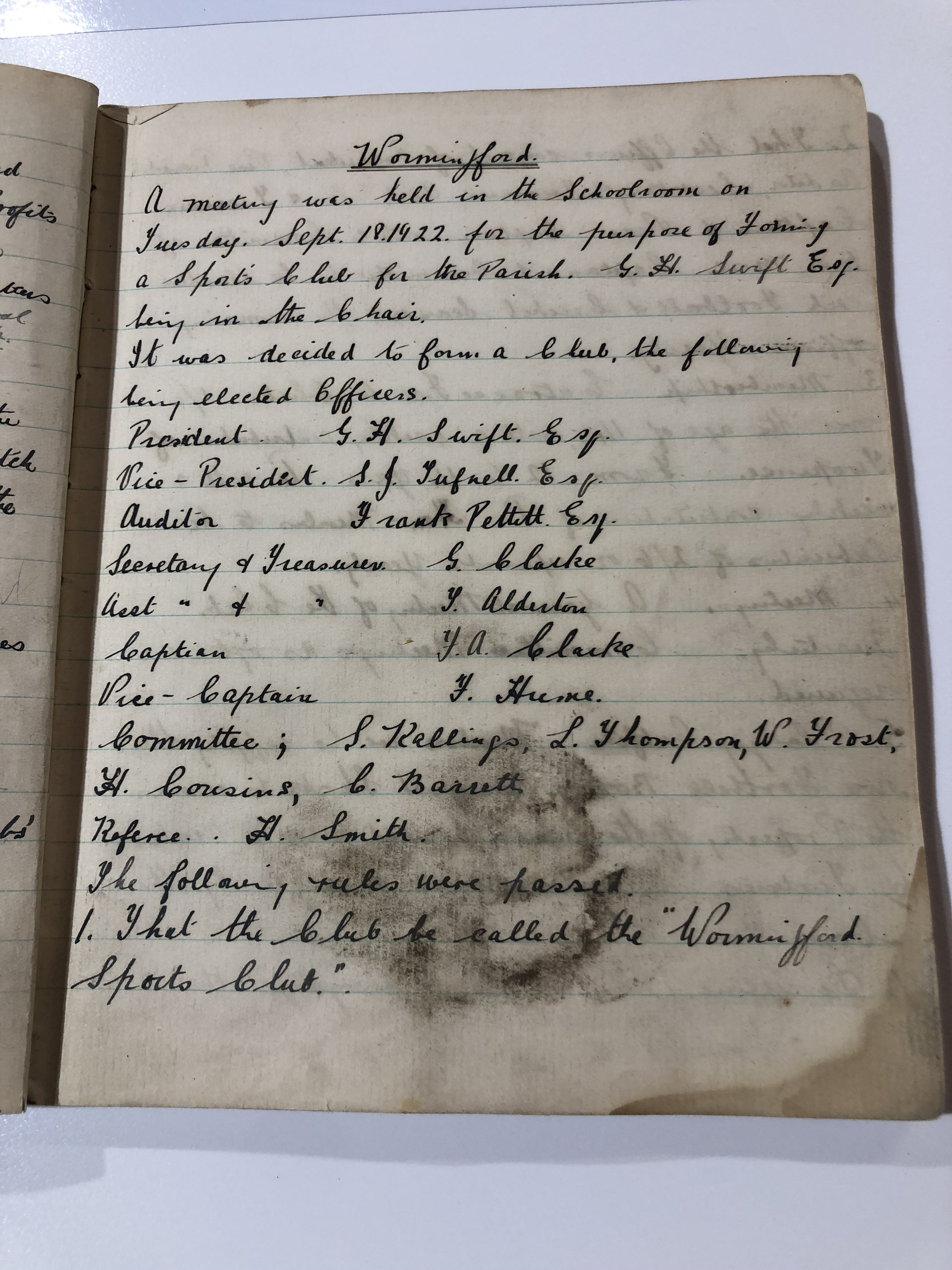
Wormingford Sports Club 1922

The cricket club has been a part of the village for many years. The team no longer exists but played in the PDQ North division, which it joined in 1976 then rejoined in 1991.
