= Berechurch =

Suburb of Colchester, England

Coordinates: 51.86°N 00.90°E

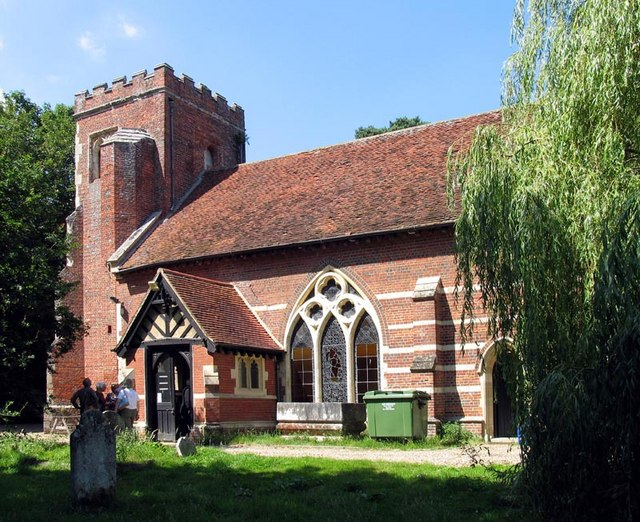
- St Michael and All Angels, Berechurch

- Location within Essex
- Population: 9,014 (2011.Ward)
- OS grid reference: TL9922
- District: Colchester
- Shire county: Essex
- Region: East
- Country: England
- Sovereign state: United Kingdom
- Post town: Colchester
- Postcode district: CO2
- Police: Essex
- Fire: Essex
- Ambulance: East of England

Berechurch is a suburb of Colchester in Essex, England, lying to the south of the city centre.

== History ==
In Saxon times the Berechurch area had been part of an estate called Donyland which covered an extensive area south of Colchester. The estate was split into four parts in the late 10th century. Three of the four parts of Donyland then came under the jurisdiction of the borough of Colchester; those three were collectively termed "West Donyland". The other part was outside the borough in the Lexden hundred, and became known as East Donyland.

St Michael's Church dates back to the 14th century and became parish church for part of the West Donyland area. The church was also known as Berechurch, which name was subsequently adopted for the area it served. The church was restored in 1872 but is now redundant. It is a grade II* listed building.

From at least the 14th century the borough of Colchester comprised sixteen parishes, four of which (Berechurch, Lexden, Greenstead, and Myland) were classed as "outlying parishes", covering areas that were more peripheral or suburban to the main part of the town as it then was.

All the parishes within the borough, including Berechurch, were united into a single parish of Colchester matching the borough in 1897. At the 1891 census (the last before the abolition of the civil parish), Berechurch had a population of 167.
