= St Michael's Church, Berechurch =

Coordinates: 51.8600°N 0.8926°E

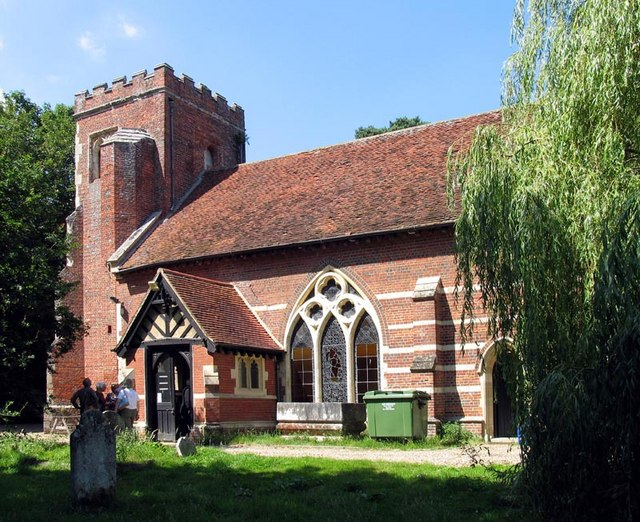
- St Michael's Church, Berechurch, from the southeast

- Location in Essex
- OS grid reference: TL 993 219
- Location: Berechurch, Essex
- Country: England
- Denomination: Anglican
- Website: Churches Conservation Trust

History
- Dedication: Saint Michael

Architecture
- Functional status: Redundant
- Heritage designation: Grade II*
- Designated: 24 February 1950
- Architect(s): Charles Pertwee (partial rebuilding)
- Architectural type: Church
- Style: Gothic, Gothic Revival
- Completed: 1878
- Closed: 1975

Specifications
- Materials: Brick with stone banding and dressings Roof tiled

St Michael's Church is a redundant Anglican church in the village of Berechurch, Essex, England. It is recorded in the National Heritage List for England as a designated Grade II* listed building, and is under the care of the Churches Conservation Trust. The church stands on the south side of Berechurch Hall Road south of the town of Colchester.

== History ==
St Michael's has never been a parish church, but rather a chapel of ease to Holy Trinity Church, Colchester. It is possible that a church was on the site in the 11th century, but the earliest part of the present building is the tower, which dates from the 14th century. The rest of the church was rebuilt in the late 15th century, re-using some of the earlier material. A chapel was added to the north of the church in the early 16th century, and this was completed before 1533. In 1536 Thomas Audley, the Lord Chancellor to Henry VIII, was licensed to create a separate rectory at Berechurch, and it is thought that Audley may have been responsible for building the chapel, which now bears his name. More work was done to the church in the early 17th century.

In 1872 the church was entirely rebuilt, apart from the tower and the Audley Chapel, by Charles Pertwee, re-using some of the earlier features. The south porch was added in 1878. After the Second World War, the nearby town of Colchester grew, and new housing estates were built in the area. St Michael's became too small for the congregation, and a new church dedicated to Saint Margaret was built nearby in 1968–72. The congregation moved to the new church in 1973, and St Michael's was declared redundant in 1975. The main part of the church was converted for other uses, but the Audley chapel was vested in the Churches Conservation Trust in 1981.

== Architecture ==
=== Exterior ===
The church is constructed in brick with stone dressings, and has tiled roofs. Around the body of the church and the chapel is decorative stone banding. Its plan consists of a nave and chancel, with a north chapel (the Audley Chapel), a south porch and a west tower. The tower is in three stages, with diagonal buttresses, a stair turret at the southeast, and an embattled parapet. There is a door and a window on the west face of the tower, and bell openings in the top stage on all sides. The windows in the nave all date from the 19th century, the window to the east of the porch being particularly large. The east window of the chancel has been re-set from the earlier church; it dates to the early 17th century and contains Perpendicular-style tracery. The chapel has a large three-light east window dating from the 16th century with brick tracery. The west wall contains a 16th-century brick doorway.

=== Interior ===
The nave, chancel and tower have been converted for non-ecclesiastical purposes. The Audley Chapel has a hammerbeam roof with carvings that include the emblems of Henry VIII and Catherine of Aragon. Also on the roof are heraldic badges containing the arms of Audley of Walden. The chapel contains monuments, the most notable of which is to Sir Henry Audley, erected in 1648 before he died. It includes a white marble reclining effigy in armour, on a black and white chest containing the carved figures of his five children. There is also a tablet to Robert Audley who died in 1624, with memento mori motifs. There are further memorials dating from the 19th century.

== External features ==
The churchyard contains the war graves of an army officer and a Royal Air Force officer of World War I.

== See also ==
- List of churches preserved by the Churches Conservation Trust in the East of England
