= Tymperleys =

Tudor townhouse in Essex, England

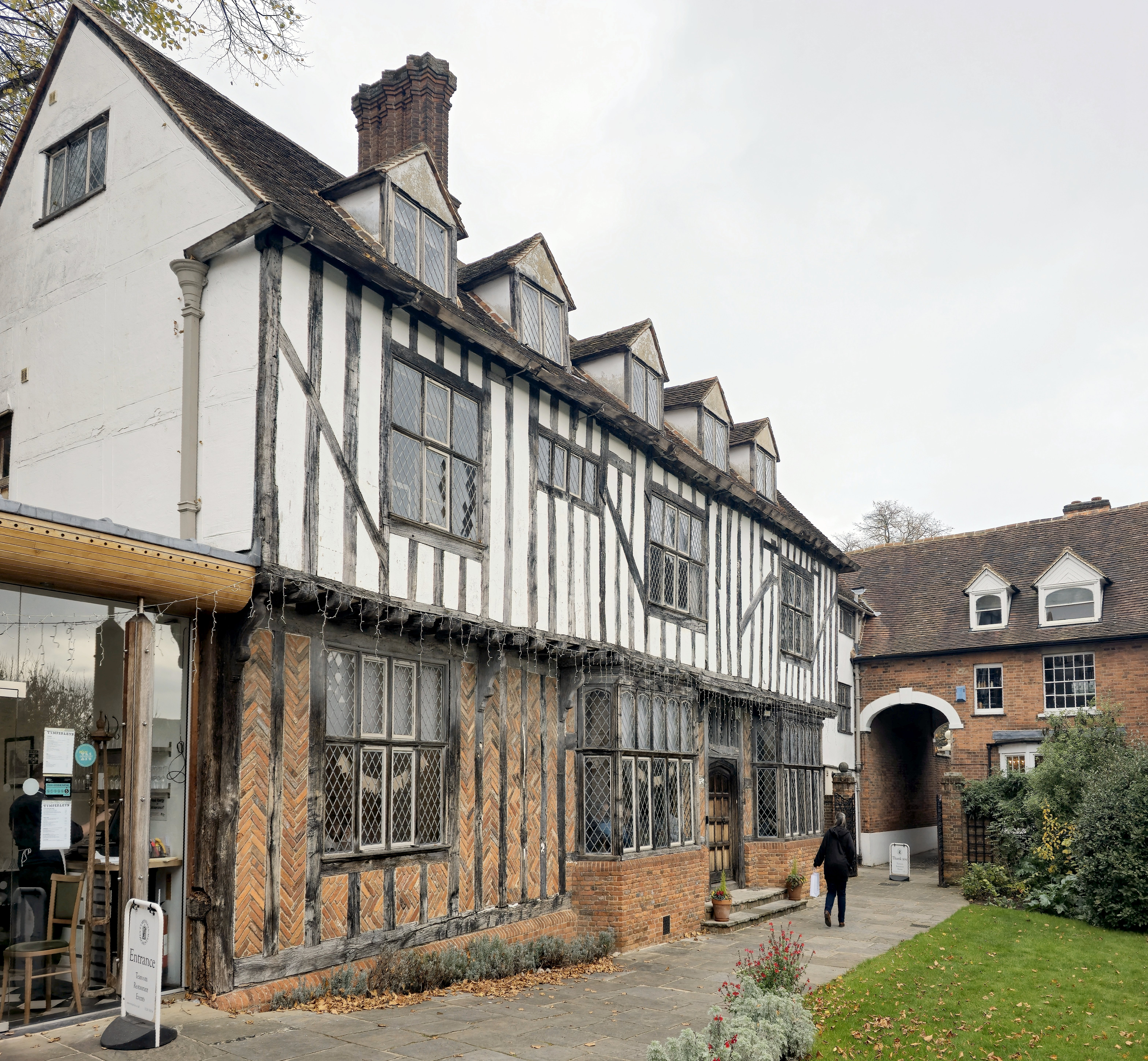
- Interactive map of the Tymperleys area

General information
- Location: Colchester, Essex, England
- Coordinates: 51°53′18.96″N 0°53′56.4″E
- Year built: 15th century

Tymperleys is a Tudor merchant house in Colchester, Essex, England. It has been a Grade II* listed building since 1950.

== History ==
Tymperleys was built in the 1490s for John Tymperleys, steward of the Duke of Norfolk. The building faces out onto a private garden, accessed from the street via an archway.

Tymperleys was the birthplace and family home of physicist William Gilbert, now commemorated by a blue plaque.

By the 1660s, Tymperleys had been subdivided into six separate cottages, and around this time an exterior staircase was added.

== Present day ==
In the 1950s the building was purchased by Bernard Mason, who renovated it significantly, and opened a clock museum on the premises in 1987. With 216 clocks and 12 watches, the museum housed one of the largest collections in Britain.

Following Mason's death, the building was left to Colchester City Council. The clock museum closed in 2011, with parts of the collection moved to nearby Hollytrees Museum.

As of 2026, Tymperleys is home to a bookshop, a tea room, and is available for hire as a wedding venue.
