= West Bergholt =

Village in Essex, England

Coordinates: 51.91°N 0.85°E

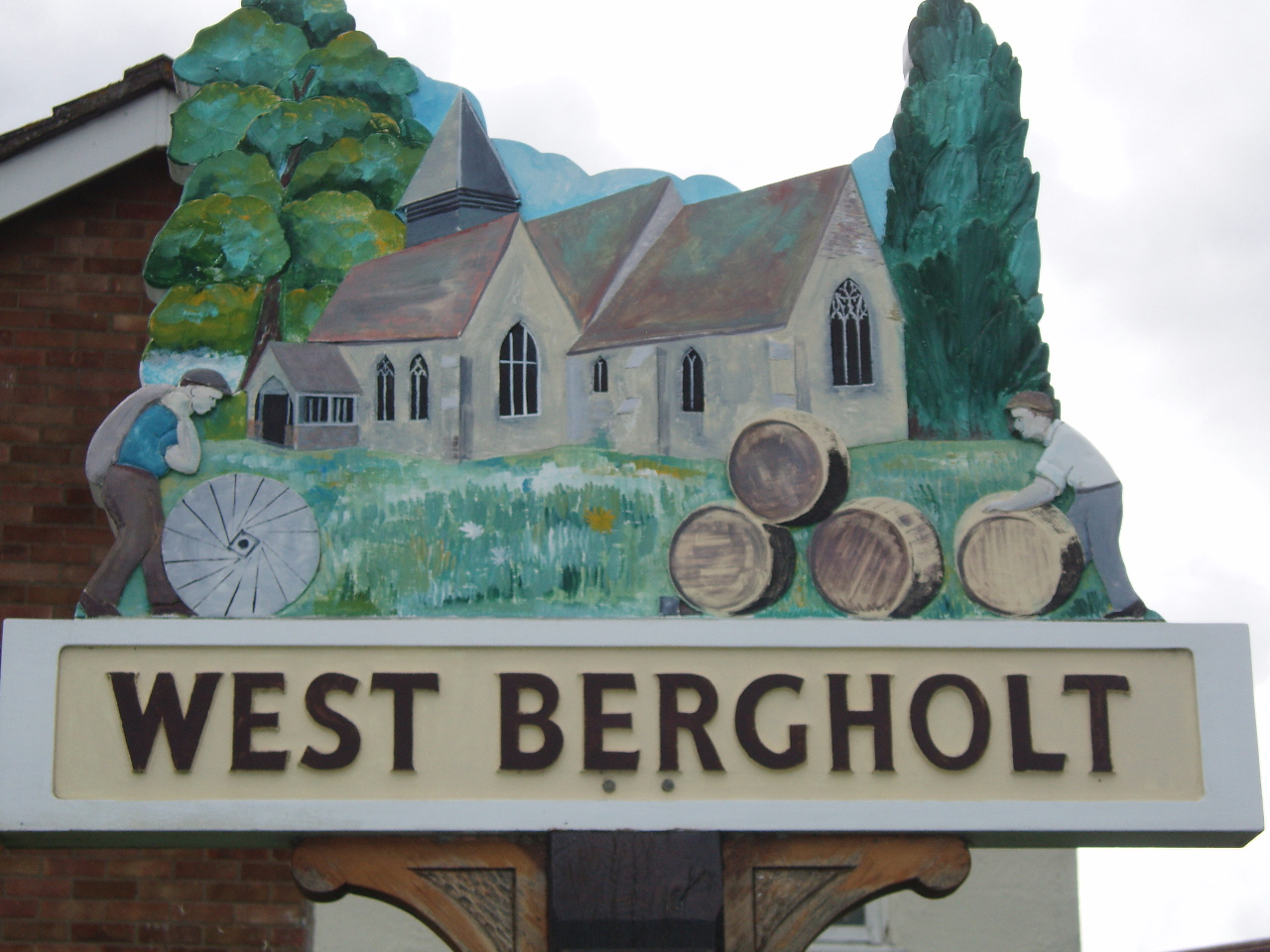

- Location within Essex
- Population: 3,310 (Parish, 2021)
- OS grid reference: TL965270
- Civil parish: West Bergholt
- District: Colchester
- Shire county: Essex
- Region: East
- Country: England
- Sovereign state: United Kingdom
- Post town: Colchester
- Postcode district: CO6
- Dialling code: 01206
- Police: Essex
- Fire: Essex
- Ambulance: East of England
- UK Parliament: Harwich and North Essex

West Bergholt, formerly known as Bergholt Sackville, is a village and civil parish in the City of Colchester district of Essex, England. It lies 3 miles (5 km) north-west of the centre of Colchester. At the 2021 census the parish had a population of 3,310.

== Village ==
The village lies in and around a triangle formed by Colchester Road, Chapel Road and Lexden Road.

Around the village lie numerous farms and large areas of woodland, including Hillhouse Wood, always known locally as Bluebell Wood, which was purchased by the Woodland Trust with the help of local people. Many walks exist through the wood, and a migrant population of various breeds of deer can sometimes be seen.

Elmer's was the butcher shop. Digby's was the name of the general store, which is now the East of England Co-operative Society. Mr Digby's son drove a local bus service to Colchester.

== History ==
=== Prehistoric ===
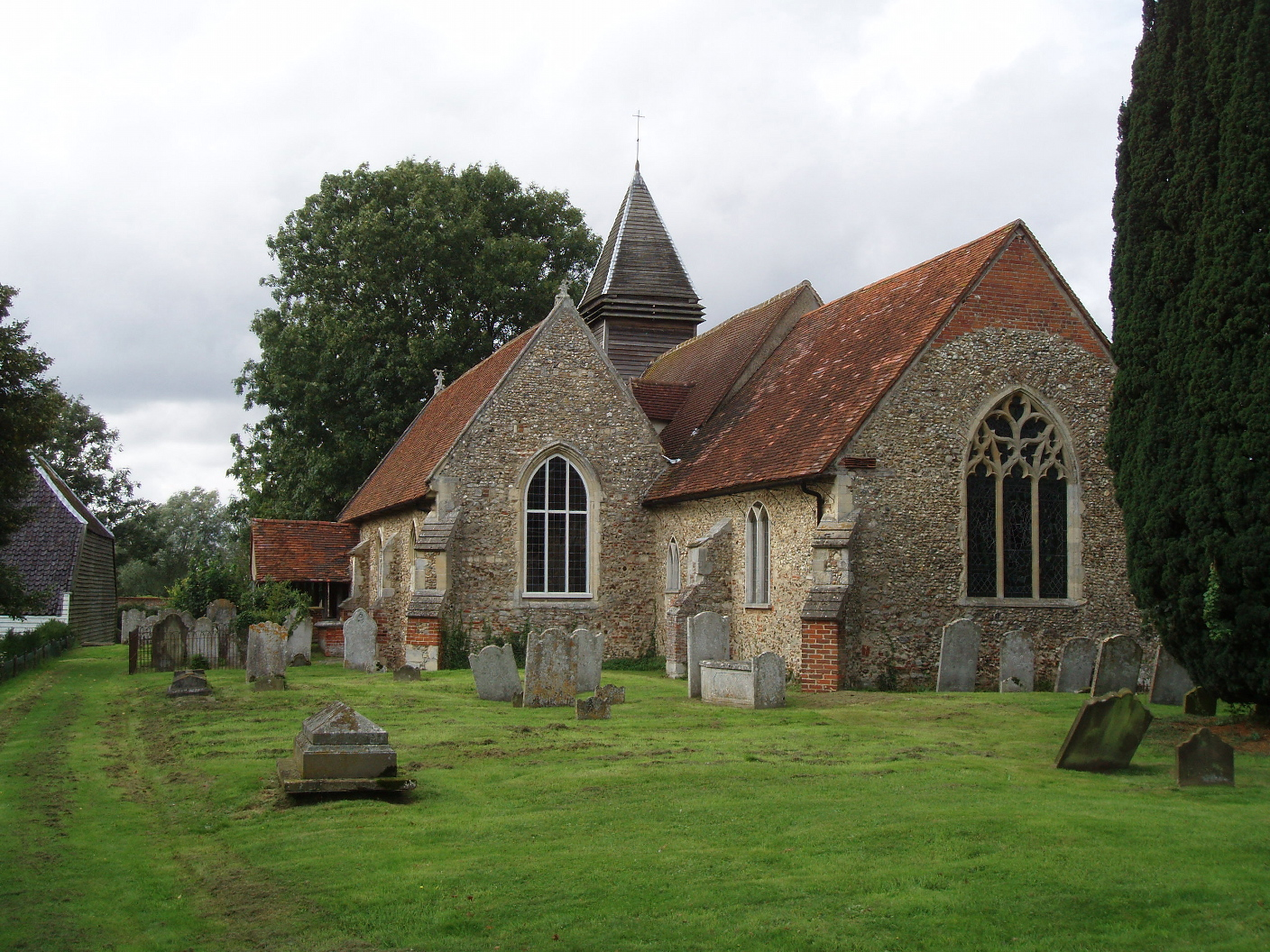
Old St Mary's Church, West Bergholt.

Prehistoric, Iron-Age, and Roman material from West Bergholt Hall, St. Mary's church, and nearby sites suggest that the area may have been continuously settled. Scattered finds in the parish include several Palaeolithic axes from the heath, Iron-Age and Roman pottery and coins. There are large areas of undated cropmarks to the south of Hill House farm.

An archaeological dig carried out in 1977 found evidence of a Bronze Age cemetery just to the south of Chitts Hill Bridge. The dig found seven circular ditches, believed to be former central mounds, which contained cremation burials in urns, some upright. Ten cremations were found without urns and five were of children. Neolithic flints were discovered, representing scrapers, blades and cutting flakes. The pottery found dated the site to between 1500 and 1000 BC.

=== The Normans ===
The Normans reached the village in 1067, after their conquest of 1066. The village had already been named Bergholta by the Anglo-Saxons, meaning "wood on a hill" (the woodland in reference here is believed to be the modern Hillhouse Wood on the outskirts of the village). The village also already had a church, in the form of a wooden single-celled building on the site of the current "Old Church", although was one of the least populous parishes in Lexden Hundred in the Middle Ages. The combined total of free tenants, unfree tenants, and slaves was 27 in 1066 and probably 32 in 1086. In 1377 only 105 inhabitants paid the poll tax.

Until the arrival of the Normans the village was split between two landowners: Leofwin Croz, Lord of the Manor, and Alfays Goding. They were replaced by Norman barons, Roger de Poitou and Richard fitz Gilbert. Roger de Poitou rebelled against the King Henry I in 1102, was banished to Normandy and his lands were removed. Richard fitz Gilbert was aligned with King Henry, and was allowed to retain his land.

=== Bergholt Sackville ===
The village changed its name to Bergholt Sackville in 1119 after Robert Sackville, son of Herband de Sackville, became Lord of the Manor. The Sackville family came to England during the time of the Norman Conquest and Robert was a member of the Royal Court and close friend of King Henry fighting for him at the Battle of Tinchebray in 1106. He was a religious man who became the first official rector of St. Mary's Church and donated a 240-acre (0.97 km^{2}) estate in the village to St John's Abbey of Colchester. This estate was run by the Almery Priest, who gave the profits from the running of the Almery Farm to the poor of the village. Over the years there has been a confusion in the name of this farm and it has now become commonly known as Armoury Farm. After the dissolution of the monasteries by King Henry VIII the estate was sold to Richard Duke in 1544, who was one of the civil servants responsible for administrating land seized by the King. However, the estate was finally brought back into the Sackville family by John Sackville in 1544.

Bergholt has not always managed to maintain good relations with the Crown. During the Reign of King John, Jordon Sackville got on the wrong side of the King (Jordon was a rebel Baron and said to be an assistant to one of the twenty-five Peeres of the Reamle to see the Magna Carta signed) and had all of his land removed, including the Bergholt Manor, even though his father and previous Lord of the Manor, Geoffrey Sackville, was knighted by John. However, fortune landed on Jordon's side, as when King Henry III came to the throne in 1216 Jordon was granted all his land back. Although then his grandson, also called Jordon, assisted in the Barons' Revolt against King Henry III, claiming that he was not fit to rule the country in his 60s and was taken prisoner at the Battle of Evesham in 1265. However, as the King was a friend of his grandfather, he was pardoned after a year. Jordon's heir, Andrew Sackville whose sonne and heire, named Andrew Sackuill, was underage at the time of his father's death and was placed under the King's Ward, was likewise imprisoned in Dover Castle. Nevertheless, by the special command of the King, he married an Honourable Ladie of the household to Queen, whereby he not only gained the King's favour, but the greatest part of his inheritance, gaining the family's land in East Sussex. He died before 1291 and Bergholt Hall passed to his son, another Andrew de Sackville. The second Andrew held the manor until his death in 1316 and was succeeded by his son, a third Andrew de Sackville, who, in 1347, was given free warden in Bergholt by Edward III, allowing him to kill game in his manor. He died in 1370, and Bergholt Hall passed to his widow Maud. During Andrew's reign as Lord of the Manor Bergholt had become one of the poorest parishes in the Lexden Hundred by 1327 with the highest individual taxpayer be assessed being 7s. ½d, this was before the boom in the cloth industry which brought wealth to the village.

Maud married Edmund de la Pole, brother of Michael de la Pole, Earl of Suffolk, who took control of the Manor during her lifetime, but after her death in 1393 the manor passed to Sir Thomas Sackville, the son, possibly illegitimate, of Andrew de Sackville (d. 1370), as both of his legitimate half-brothers – Sir Andrew the younger (c. 1340–1366) and John – died in their father's lifetime. However, this only occurred after an eight-month dispute as to whether he or the Sackvilles of Fawley were the rightful heirs.

Sir Thomas led quite an eventful life, from preventing the Duke of Lancaster, a newcomer to the landed gentry, from holding courts, poaching in the duchy parks and burning a commission issued under the Duke's seal, to being temporarily imprisoned for abetting and harbouring murderers. He was luckily in good favour with the King's favourite Sir James Burners, who got him a royal pardon. He was the MP for Sussex. During his time as Lord of the Manor, the local MP and Speaker of the House of Commons, John Doreward waived 200 marks that were owed to him from Parliament in returned to be granted with several royal licenses, to found a chantry in Stanway church, to augment the income of the chaplain at Bergholt and to alienate his manor of Tendring to St John's Abbey in Colchester.

At the end of the 15th century the price of ale had become too high in the village and the Bergholt Sackville Manorial Court charged four brewers for charging too much for their beer, as it was an offence to charge above the fixed rate. The village ale tasters were also fined, as it was their responsibility to keep an eye on such matters.

Sir Thomas died in 1433 and the manor passed to his son Edward (d. 1450). He was succeeded by his son Humphrey (d. 1488) who left the estate to his son Richard (d. 1523). He was followed by his son John Sackville, Esq., Member of Parliament for East Grinstead and married to Margaret Boleyn, aunt of Anne Boleyn. John, unlike many of his ancestors, had lived in Essex, although it was most likely his other estate in Mount Bures, as he bequeathed sums to the poor there but not Bergholt. The manor then passed to John Sackville's son, Sir Richard "Fill-Sack" Sackville, MP for Chichester, nicknamed by reason of his great wealth and the vast patrimony which he left to his son, created Baron Buckhurst in 1557. It is believed that Richard's brother John Sackville (also MP for East Grinstead) intended to set up residence in the village, following in his father's footsteps by living in Essex, as he bought the ‘Almarye' in Bergholt from Richard Duke, a fellow MP.

After his death in 1566 the manor was held in dower by his widow Winifred, who married Sir John Paulet, Marquess of Winchester (d. 1576). Richard's son Thomas, who became Earl of Dorset, sold the reversion of the manor in 1571 to John Dister, who gained possession in 1575. This purchase was probably hoped by Dister to be a quite lucrative move with the village undergoing a population boom during this period, when baptisms were nearly double the burials, although some historians believe that many people most likely migrated to Colchester.

This was end of the Sackville family in the village, although they kept the right to appoint the Rectors of St Mary's. The village name was not changed to West Bergholt until 1910.

By the 16th century, the village was involved in the booming cloth trade and many of the villagers were employed in removing the natural oils from the cloth and spinning wool. However, this prosperity was almost removed from the village by the 1557 Act of Parliament, which forbade the making or selling of any woollen cloth except in a market town. Thus, the local town of Colchester was unaffected, but Bergholt was not included as part of the town. Consequently, Bergholt allied with Bocking and Dedham and petitioned Parliament for a change in the law. They were successful in passing the Act for the Continuance of the Making of Woollen Clothe in Dyvers Townes in the Countie of Essex. This allowed the three villages, called towns in the act, to carry on their businesses providing they had been trading for seven or more years.

In 1565, Thomas Love, founder of Love's Charity, died and left a sum of money to acquire land and rent it to the poor of the village, as he had received such a warm welcome when visiting the village during his lifetime.

=== Trouble at the church ===
Queen Elizabeth I had to step in twice to sort out problems with the village vicars. The first troublesome vicar was Reverend Edmund Tarrell, who was noted for spending too much time in the public houses and not enough time in the Church. The Queen had to intervene after it was reported that the vicar had failed to attend evensong and failing to give the last rites to a woman as he was in a Colchester pub and could not be found. His most serious offence, which he managed to escape, was not reading out King Henry VIII's latest religious doctrine, which carried the penalty of death. Later in 1581 it was reported to the Queen by a member of the congregation that the village's vicar, Reverend Richard Kyrby, refused to conduct the service in English after the introduction of her new Prayer Book, which he claimed should remain in Latin and that the Queen's reforms were "politically incorrect". Kyrby was tried for treason, which he denied. The case was dropped after the accuser backed down. Sixteen years later the Queen stepped in and had him removed.

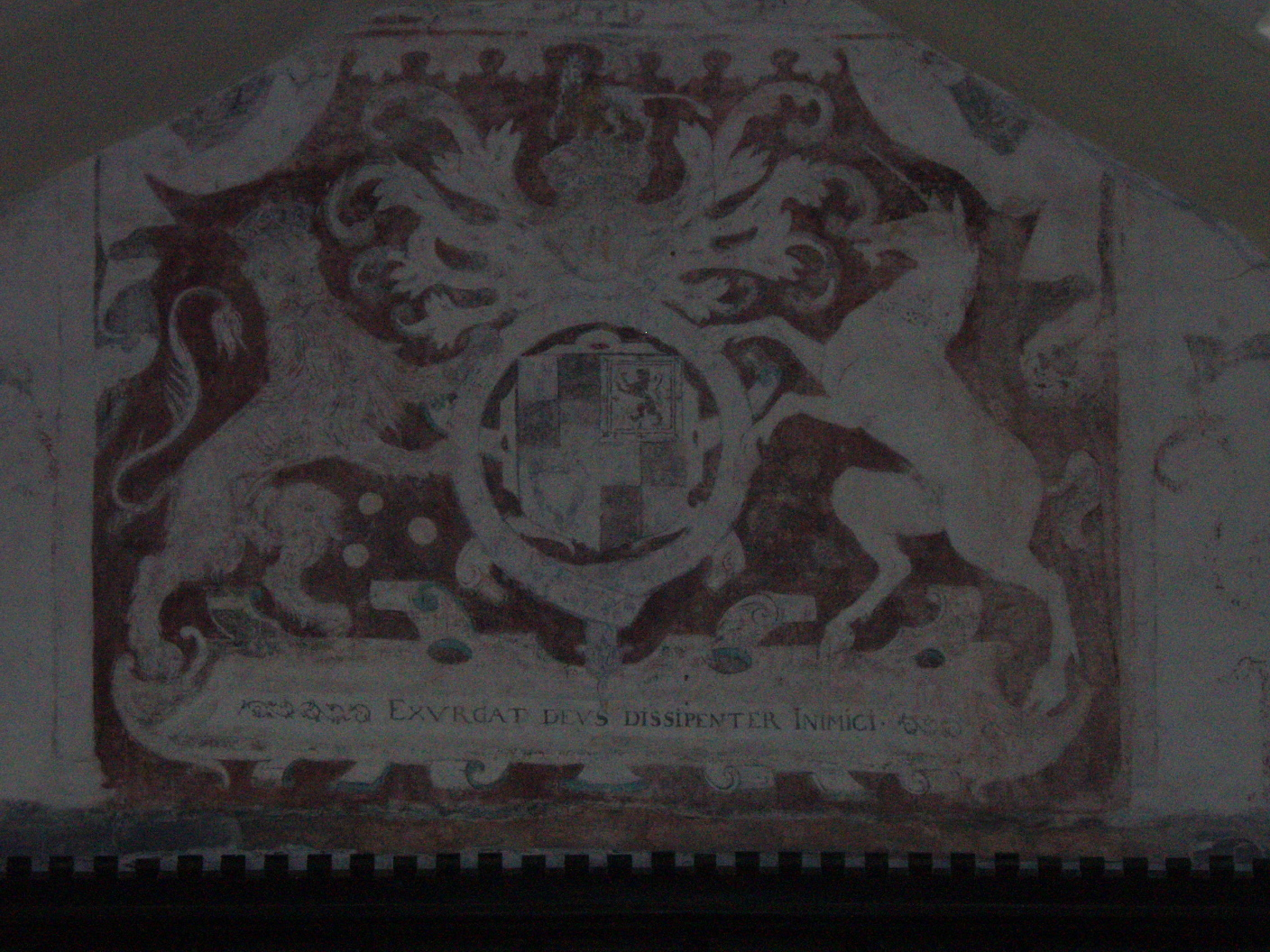
James I's Coat of Arms in Old St Mary's Church

Later on, to remind all the villagers who was king, King James I had his royal coat of arms painted in the Church. This coat of arms can still be seen to this day if one stands in the gallery and looks towards the altar. The motto on the arms reads "Exurgat Deus Dissipenter Ininice", this is the opening line of Psalm 68 (Let God arise and let His enemies be scattered). Opposite James's arms is a set of Hanoverian arms acquired in 1816.

There is evidence that the village was sympathetic towards the Parliamentarians during the English Civil War as Gregory Holland, inducted as vicar in 1613, was threatened with removal in 1644 as a royalist and conformist, and for ungodly behaviour. He was allowed to retain the living. However, in 1650, Reverend Gregory Holland was called before the Committee for Scandalous Ministers for preaching Royalist sermons during the Civil War, along with drunkenness and swearing in Church. His main offence was preaching royalist sermons and claiming that it was "not fir got farmers and tradesmen to know the mystery of their salvation, but only for himself and such as he." The result of this hearing was that he was allowed to continue in his post as vicar at Bergholt, but that the parishioners elect him a curate, who would pay him the majority of his stipend. The curate chosen was nonconformist, Robert Billio. However, a group of parishioners were still not happy with the Rector's views and in 1655 Samuel Skillingham, Mary Cooke and Jonathan Bundock, all waited until the end of the sermon before standing up and giving their view of what he preached and continued afterwards to talk about their own religious experiences, which was typical of Quakers of the time. They were imprisoned in Colchester Castle. Skillingham was also sued for Tithes along with Stephen Davy, John Child, John Crofier, Moses Davy and Daniel Bicknall, but the charges were dropped following the death of their prosecutors. However, Skillingham was later beaten with Zacky Child for attending a meeting at Wethersfield, while John Child had his horse taken from him.

During the Civil War, the Lord of Bergholt Manor was Sir John Denham, a poet and Royalist spy. He was exiled to Holland, along with the rest of the Royal Family, and because of his large gambling debts his property was sold to his political enemy Sir Harbottle Grimston, 2nd Baronet, Recorder and MP for Colchester.

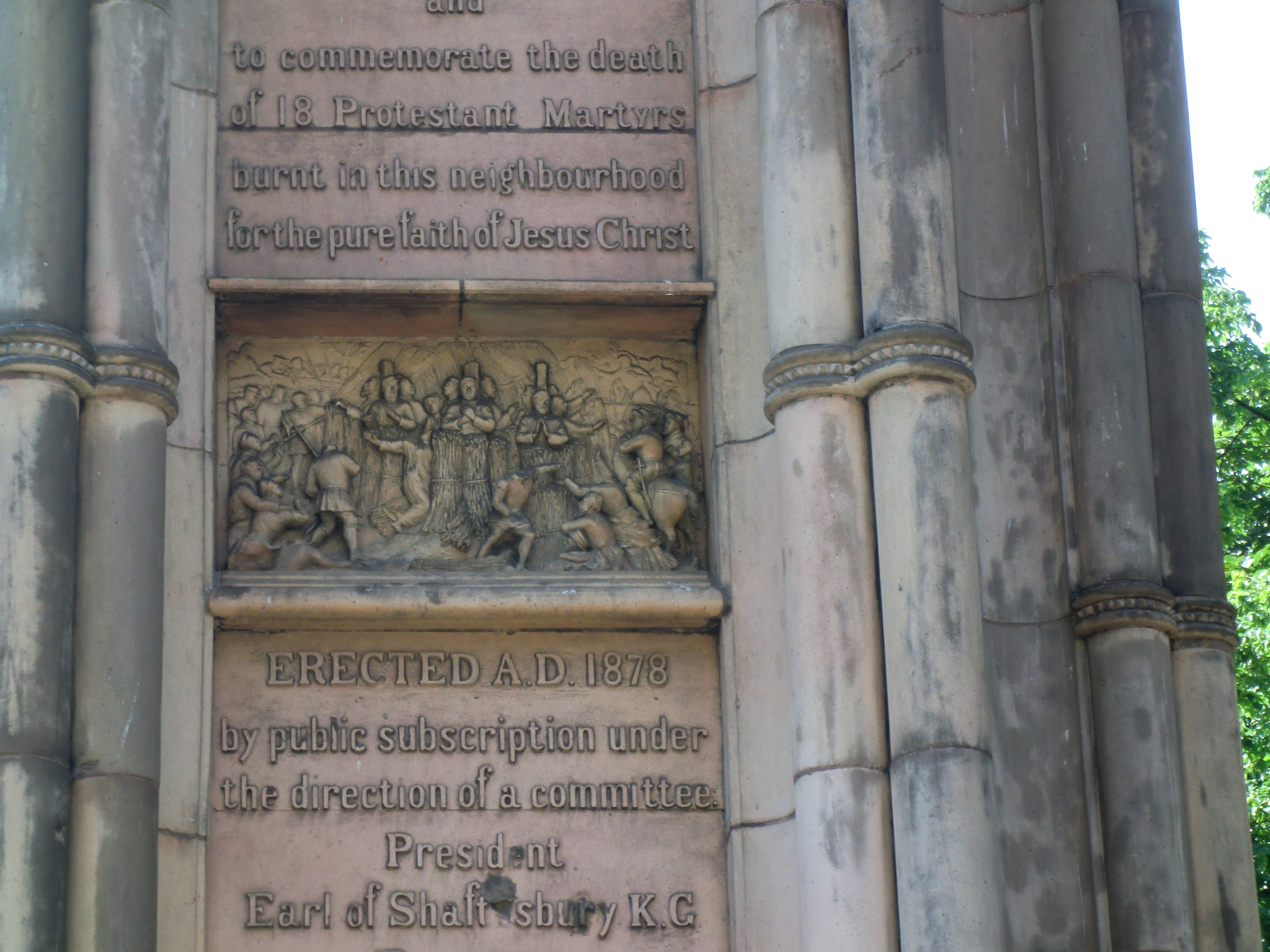
Stratford Martyrs Memorial, London

It was not only the vicars that were in trouble:a parishioner who in 1520 abused the rector in the pulpit, calling him a false, forsworn man, may have held Protestant views. In 1556 a member of the parish, Agnes George, part of the Stratford Martyrs, was out of favour with Queen Mary, for refusing to attend church until the service was no longer conducted in the Roman Catholic tradition. She was then tried before the Bishop of London, Reverend Edmund Bonner, along with 12 others. During her time at Newgate Prison she wrote a letter attacking the Pope for being the Anti-Christ, saying that she was baptised in Christ's Church not Rome and refusing to believe that bread and wine became the body and blood of Christ. She was burned at Stratford before 20,000 people. In 1879, a large monument was erected in St John's churchyard in Stratford Broadway, to commemorate the thirteen and others who were executed or tortured in Stratford during the persecutions.

Agnes's husband Richard, a labourer, was also arrested in 1557. He escaped execution but his second wife, Christine, was also burnt, this time for heresy, along with two others from North Essex. They too were sentenced by Edmund Bonner, who claimed that they were "a spirited danger to other Christians" and a hazard to the state because they believed in redistribution of wealth. They were held in the Colchester Castle dungeon until 26 May 1558 when they were executed in front of a large crowd outside Moot Hall on the High Street. This was not the end of the saga for the George family.

In another hunt for heretics in the parishes of North Essex, twenty-two Protestants, including Richard George, were interrogated at Colchester and were sent to London, bound in chains and rope, for trial. One woman in the group was set free at Chelmsford after agreeing to convert to the Roman Catholic Church. Witness accounts claimed that the rest of the group had ample opportunity to escape and were treated quite well. They were tried at Edmound Bonner's house, where the group took the opportunity to ask the crowd attending to convert to Protestantism.

Bonner asked his agents to try to persuade the group to recant but the agents informed him that they were too "desperate and obstinate". Bonner, fearing that sending too many to the stake would cause unrest and maybe riots, came up with a compromise of a confession of faith that pleased both Catholics and Protestants, which they all signed. The group were then set free to make their own way back to Essex. Alas, Richard George, and his wife, were rearrested for his attitude towards Roman Catholics and imprisoned in Colchester Castle. In a fortunate turn of events for the Georges, Queen Elizabeth was crowned during their imprisonment and ended the persecution of Protestants. They were set free.

=== The King's Wrath ===
In 1540, the son of John Abell, Lord of the Manor of Cooks Hall, Bergholt, was executed at Smithfield on the orders of King Henry VIII. Thomas Abell who was brought up at Cooks Hall in the village, was chaplain to Henry's first wife, Catherine of Aragon, whom the King wanted to divorce to marry Anne Boleyn. Henry claimed that when he married Catherine, he had broken God's law and the marriage was invalid. On a secret mission to Spain, the Queen's chaplain sought to destroy the King's case for divorce and back in England, he argued against the King both in print and from the pulpit – with the inevitable result. After seven years in the Tower of London he was sentenced to "be drawn on a hurdle to the place of execution, there to be hanged, cut down alive, your members to be cut off and cast in the fire, your bowels burnt before your eyes, your head smitten off, your body to be quartered at the King's will, and God have mercy on your soul." There is still to be seen on the wall of his prison in the Tower of London a rebus consisting of the symbol of a bell with an A upon it and the name Thomas above, which he carved during his confinement. He was beatified by Pope Leo XIII as one of a group of fifty-four English Martyrs on 29 December 1886.

=== Development of modern Bergholt ===
1725 is the first year that records of the village's largest pub appear – The White Hart, which is still in use today, although frequent fines for unlicensed brewing, breaking the assize of ale, and permitting the playing of illegal games such as tennis, suggest that several alehouses existed in the later 15th and earlier 16th centuries. Alehouses were licensed in 1576, 1580, and 1608, although an unlicensed one owned by a collar-maker was suppressed in 1618. There were three unlicensed alehouses or beerhouses in 1644.

The White Hart was a popular meeting place for farmers taking sheep and cattle to market, which caused the creation of the cluster of buildings known as the Crescent next to the pub. The Crescent contained four buildings: Anerly, Bascete, the Wheelwright's and the Blacksmith's shop, which original parts of can still be seen, although are all residential houses now. The Anerley was formerly known as The Crown and Sceptre Brewery and the Bascete used to contain a chapel at the rear of the building.

==== The Brewery ====
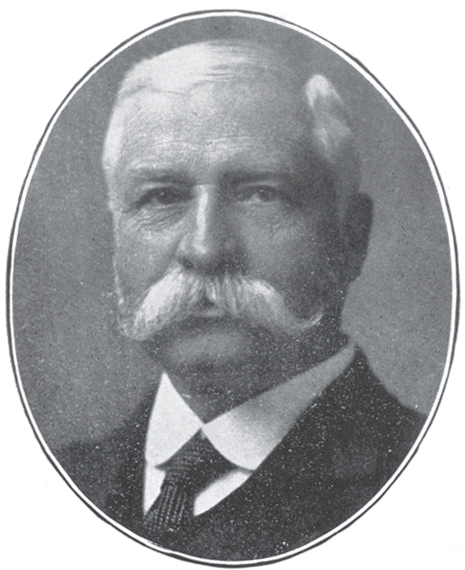
O. G. Orpen

The Daniell family had lived in Colchester since 1509 and were freemen of the town. The first member of the family to start brewing was Thomas Daniel during the 18th century, who produced beer for the workers on his farm. The beer was such a favourite with the men that he started selling it around the village and local area and in 1859 expanded the operation to two new breweries run by his two sons. The firm went from strength to strength and became a public company in 1886, with a value of £30,000. The biggest event for the firm was to have Osmond Orpen marry into the family, who was known as the greatest brewer in England and became the Daniells' head brewer before moving on to be managing director.

This had a great impact on the village. Not only did it create more jobs and help expand the village but Osmond also ran the parish council and was overseer of the poor. In his will he, along with Lorkin Daniell, gave the land and money for the building of the village hall (Orpen Memorial Hall) and surrounding land (Lorkin Daniell Playing Field). The rapid growth of the village also encouraged service trades and building. Grocers, butchers, bakers, coopers, poulterers, and dealers in tea and fruit were established by 1851, and increased in number in later decades. Alfred Diss, builder of the new Methodist Chapel (1878), Ebeneezer Villas (1884), and possibly the small Gothic Cottages (1880s), employed 9 carpenters, 9 bricklayers, and 8 labourers in 1881. Fluctuations in the building industry were thought to have contributed to serious unemployment in the village in 1912. However, one of the most lasting improvements to the village from the legacy of the brewery was the instalment of mains water during the 1930s and then sewage and waste water disposal systems in the mid-1950s. Prior to this the village was supplied by a series of shallow wells (many of which still remain, although bricked up under the village's more modern housing estates), although there were three springs which fed public ponds at the Queen's Head, on Lexden Road, and near the White Hart, and there was a deep well at the brewery. An additional public well at the top of Newbridge Hill was closed in 1896 because its water was unfit for drinking.

The brewery suffered losses in 1958 and was forced to sell to Truman, Hanbury, Buxton and Co Ltd, who took over the brewery and its 150 tied houses, including the Treble Tile and Queen's Head in West Bergholt. Trumans used the Brewery as a bottling plant and later as transport depot until it was converted into flats in 1989.

==== Enclosure and fire raising ====
Moving back to the 1840s, the village was being dramatically changed by the agricultural revolution. The two largest impacts on the village were enclosure and the introduction of machines into the farming process.

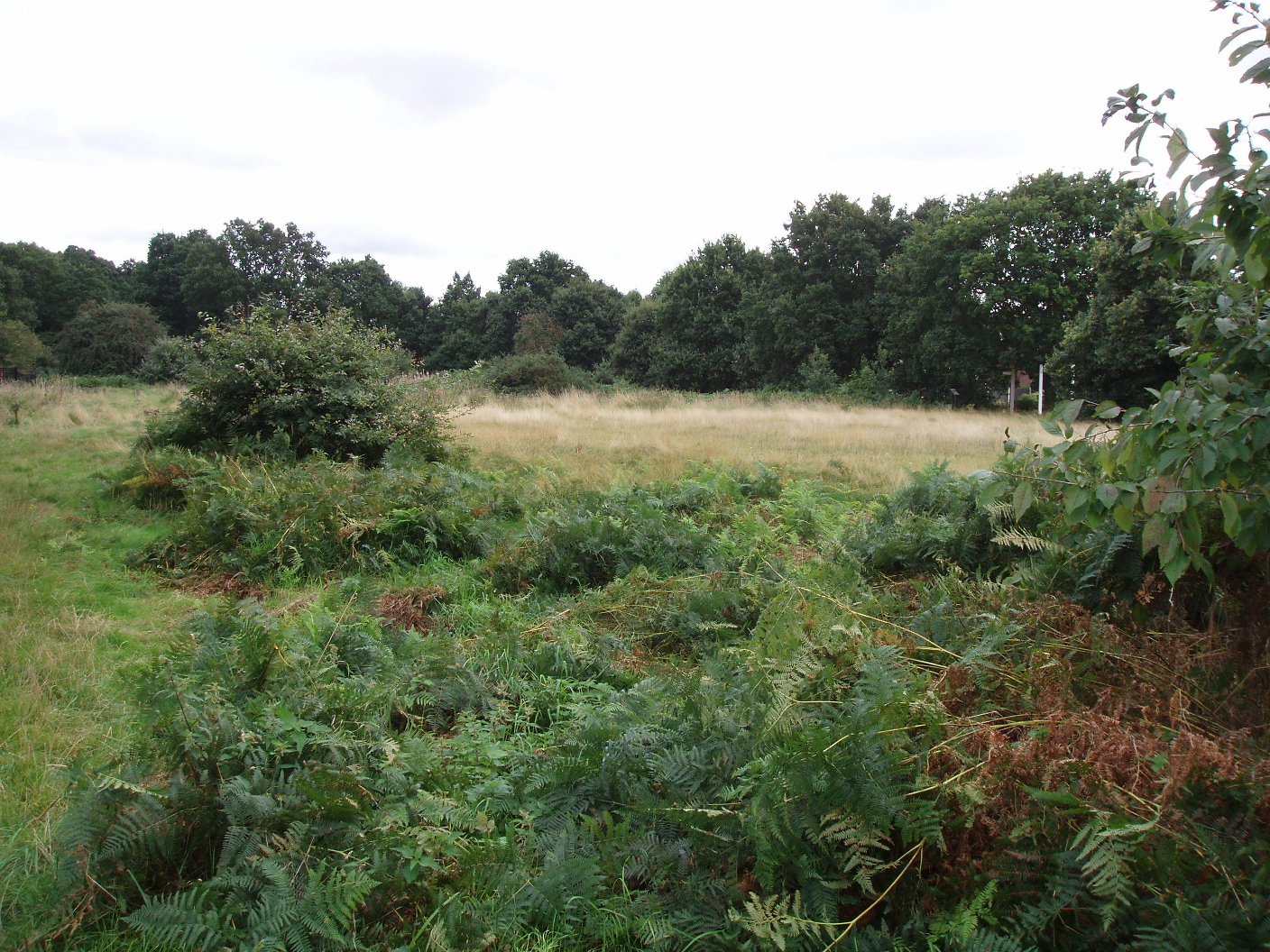
2008 View of West Bergholt's Heath

In the early 16th century overgrazing affected areas of both Bergholt and Cooks Hall Common, upon which the tenants of both manors shared. In 1575-6 neither unmarried tenants nor under-tenants of Cooks Hall manor were allowed to feed more than four sheep or any cattle on that manor's common. In 1587 and 1619 Bergholt Hall manor court forbade any tenant without a house and family to graze cattle on that manor's common. Overseers, rangers or drivers, of that common, first recorded in 1632, were in 1651 instructed to drive the heath at least three times a year and to impound illegally grazed cattle.

Encroachment on the heath apparently began in the earlier 17th century when cottages began to be illegally erected on both the Bergholt Hall manor and Cooks Hall manor wastes. By the mid 18th century many encroachments were sanctioned as long as they were registered in the manor courts. Although a few 18th-century intakes were large additions to existing freeholds or copyholds, many were occupied by small cottages or shops; other encroachments included one for a barn, another for a brick kiln, and a third for a house, but most were small and the heath was still largely unenclosed in 1777.

Enclosure happened in Bergholt in 1865, during which the Heath was divided into new areas. The old track ways and footpaths were closed and several new roads were laid out, the most important becoming Chapel Road. 4 acres (1.6 ha) of land was given to the poor for allotments and a further 4 acres (1.6 ha) for recreation (commonly known in the village as the Poor's Field). This land was held in trust by the Churchwardens and Overseers of the Poor. The maximum amount of land a single man was allowed to cultivate, without disturbance to his daily work, was ten rod measurements, which is still in use today.

A third area was set aside for a new church and graveyard, as the church was too far from the centre of the modern village, and this, it was claimed, was the cause of the low attendance. The remaining area of the land was left as the Heathlands, where villagers were able to graze their goats.

The land hand-out was carried out under the provisions of the Acts of Enclosure, Exchange and Improvement of Land. There were intended to produce the most economical use of the Heath, although largely disregarded the rights of commoners. The plan was produced by Charles Horror and approved by the Enclosure Commissioners. The plan also contained land set aside for three village ponds ("public wells"); one for Lexden Road, Chapel Road and outside the White Hart, although the latter has been filled in since the 1950s. The only opposition apparently came from gypsies camping on the heath.

The agricultural revolution was not all good news for Bergholt. Many farm labourers had been left unemployed after the dip in the agricultural trade following the war with France in 1815. and the new Poor Law. Thus, the introduction of machines only made matter worse. The result was groups of vagabonds emerging in the countryside threatening social order, who were described at the time as "masterless men." In 1842 the village witnessed the earliest signs of violence from the protesters, which led the village to become the epicentre of protest in North Essex. Their main form of protest was fire raising. Among the victims were Robert Bradbrook and Thomas Daniell, two of the most important farmers and businessmen.

One of the first fires occurred in 1843 at Hightrees Farm, which killed a horse, a calf and several poultry, as well as burning away 11 acres (4.5 ha) worth of hay and damaging the farmhouse. It is claimed that the fire could be seen from Colchester, where a large crowd gathered on North Hill. This was the first of many fires. The Police had trouble tracking down the perpetrators as many in the village were sympathetic towards them. However, in 1843 Robert Woodward was found guilty of fire raising after an undercover policeman in the White Hart and his lover came forward with evidence. He was sentenced to transportation for life to Australia.

During this period the village Cricket Club was founded on its original location to the west of the brewery. The first recorded cricket match in the village was a decade earlier between the Gentlemen of Essex and the Gentlemen of Norfolk played over three days commencing on 15 July 1831. The Essex County Standard reported that although the bad weather effected the amount of cricket that could be played, with delays on the first two days, there was considerable interest in the game. Essex won by 89 runs. By the 1940s the club had moved to its current location on Manor Road.

A football club was not formed in the village until 1911. it was nicknamed The Brewers, and played mostly friendlies using the cricket ground as a pitch. The current West Bergholt FC was founded in 1938 and became stable enough to maintain membership of a league, playing on its current location of the Memorial Field. The first success of the club came in 1981 winning the Border League Division 2.

==== Education ====
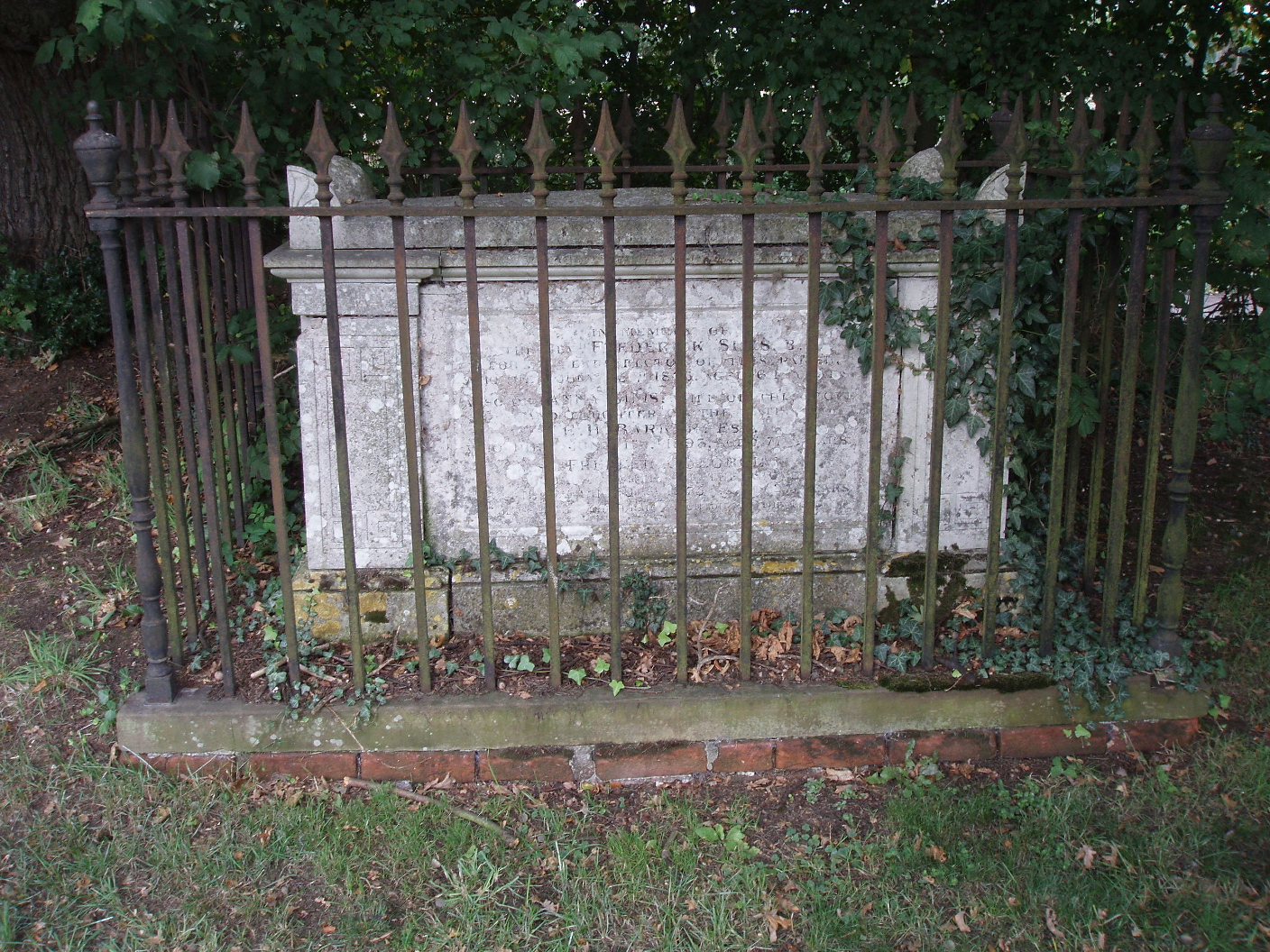
Frederick Sims' Grave

The village by the 19th century already had a fee-paying school, but nothing for the poor. The vicar at the time, Reverend William Sims, had already applied to the Church of England for funding for the building of a school for the poor, but by 1833 he had raised only £55 of the £300 needed and appealed again. By then the village had grown in numbers and more money was needed for a larger school than originally planned. However, William Sims died before he could see the fruits of his labour. Fortunately the next vicar, his son, Frederick Sims, was able to raise £400 by public subscription. The school was built on the Heath and two cottages were made alongside it: one for the schoolmaster and his wife and the other to be let out with the rent going towards the upkeep of the school. The school was initially built to accommodate 200 pupils, and the opening ceremony was held at the parish church during the Sunday Eucharist.

== Governance ==
West Bergholt is part of the electoral ward called West Bergholt and Eight Ash Green. The population of this ward at the 2011 census was 5,074.

== The buildings ==
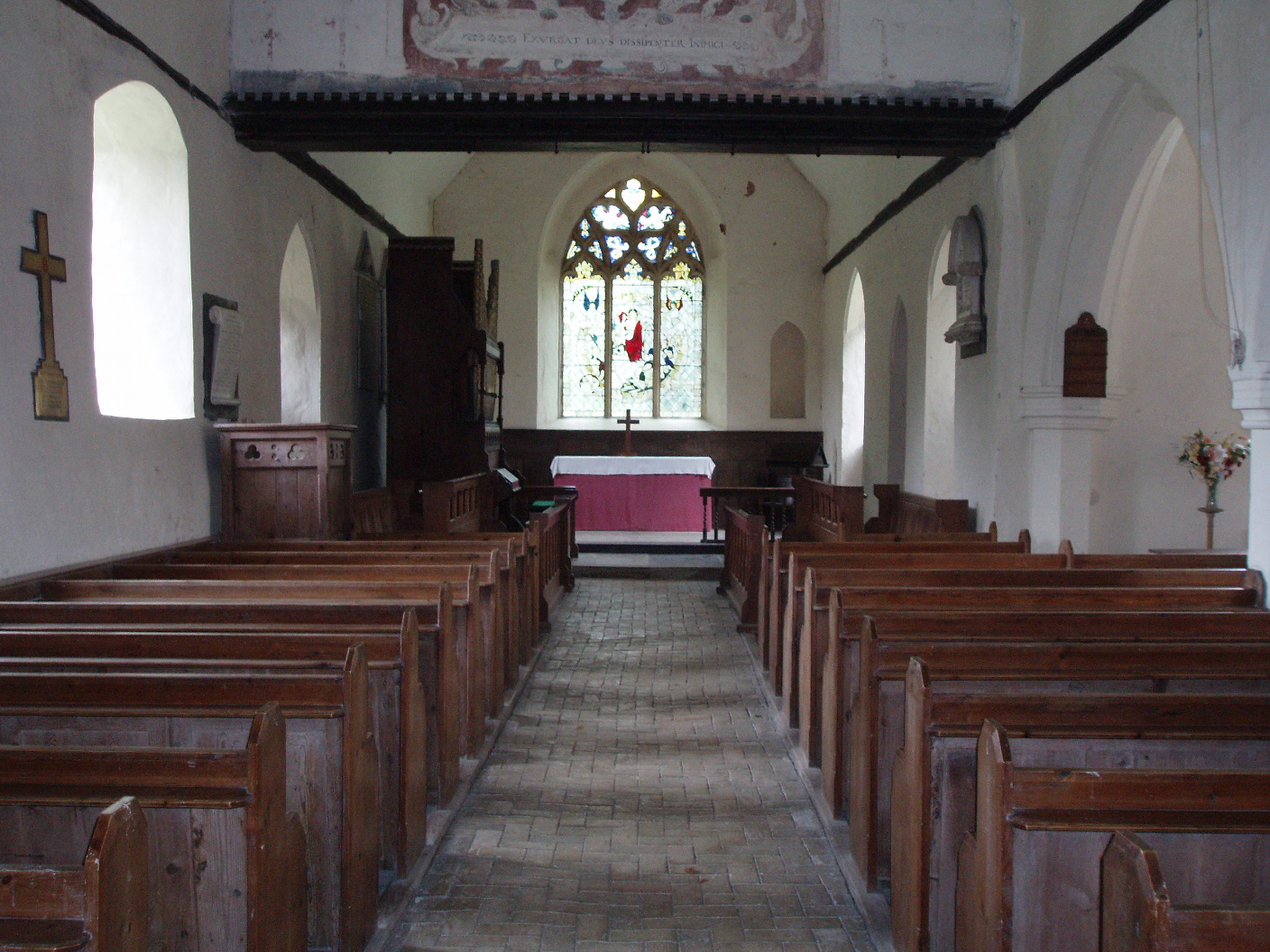
Interior of the "Old Church" (St Mary's)

There is now only one active church, St. Mary's Anglican Church. West Bergholt Methodist Church is no longer active and has recently been sold. The village has a third church, not used for regular services, which is also called St. Mary's. Several legends exist about the church and its history. Locally called "St Marys' Old Church", it used to be in the centre of the village, but as time passed the village grew away from it. While no longer in regular use, it remains consecrated and it is maintained by the Churches Conservation Trust. Like many churches it has evolved over the years. Parts date from the 11th century and the astute observer will find reused Roman bricks in its fabric, and ancient graffiti from pilgrims who have visited over the years. It is positioned at the end of what is little more than a farm track in the East Anglian countryside, and on the Essex Way long-distance footpath. It stands in a small graveyard that features a headstone with a death's head design.

== Village life ==
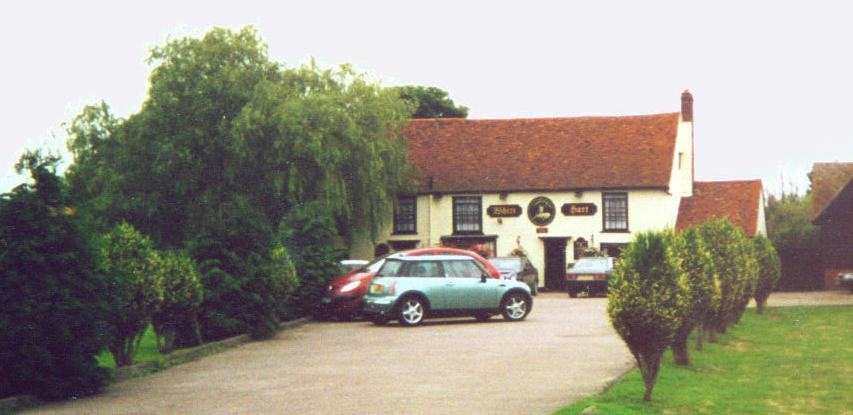
White Hart Public House

The village is home to two public houses and a social club: the White Hart and the Queens Head and West Bergholt Social Club.

=== Religion ===
The village has three active churches, St Mary's Anglican church and the Methodist church have their own buildings while the Pentecostal Fellowship meets at the Orpen Hall

== Transport ==
West Bergholt is served by a number of bus services.
