= Bertha Betsey Mason =

English businesswoman

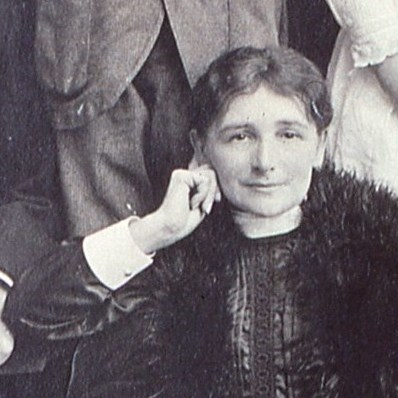
Bertha Betsey Mason

Bertha Bets(e)y Mason (née Kitton; 11 January 1872 – 12 March 1937) was a Colchester businesswoman. She was the owner and founder of E.N. Mason and Sons Ltd, a photographic business which was one of the first businesses to develop an early photocopier. Mason's Arclight business began making photographic paper for engineering drawing and progressed to photocopying machines and their patent Barco system. It also supplied printing, paper, and office supplies for draughtsman, as well as specialist equipment for technical drawing. E.N Mason and Sons became one of Colchester's major employers.

== Life and career ==
Bertha was born in Ipswich on 11 January 1872. She married Ernest Nathan Mason in Ipswich in 1892 and they had four children; Conrad (born 1893), Bernard (born 1895), Eudo (born 1901), and Helen (born 1902).

In the census of 1901 Bertha Mason was noted without an occupation. However, in 1911, her occupation was "Photographic Printer" on her "own account" rather than an employee.

Her husband, Ernest Nathan Mason worked at Paxmans in Colchester as a draughtsman and works photographer. He devised a method of making photographic blueprints from engineering drawings.

Ernest Nathan Mason was employed by Paxmans and the business was run by Bertha Mason at 1 Queen Street under her name. After her husband died in 1914, Bertha went into partnership with her two eldest sons, Conrad and Bernard. She named their company after her husband at a time when it was commonly accepted for Victorian men to name their businesses after themselves. Bertha ran the business whilst also caring for her two younger children.

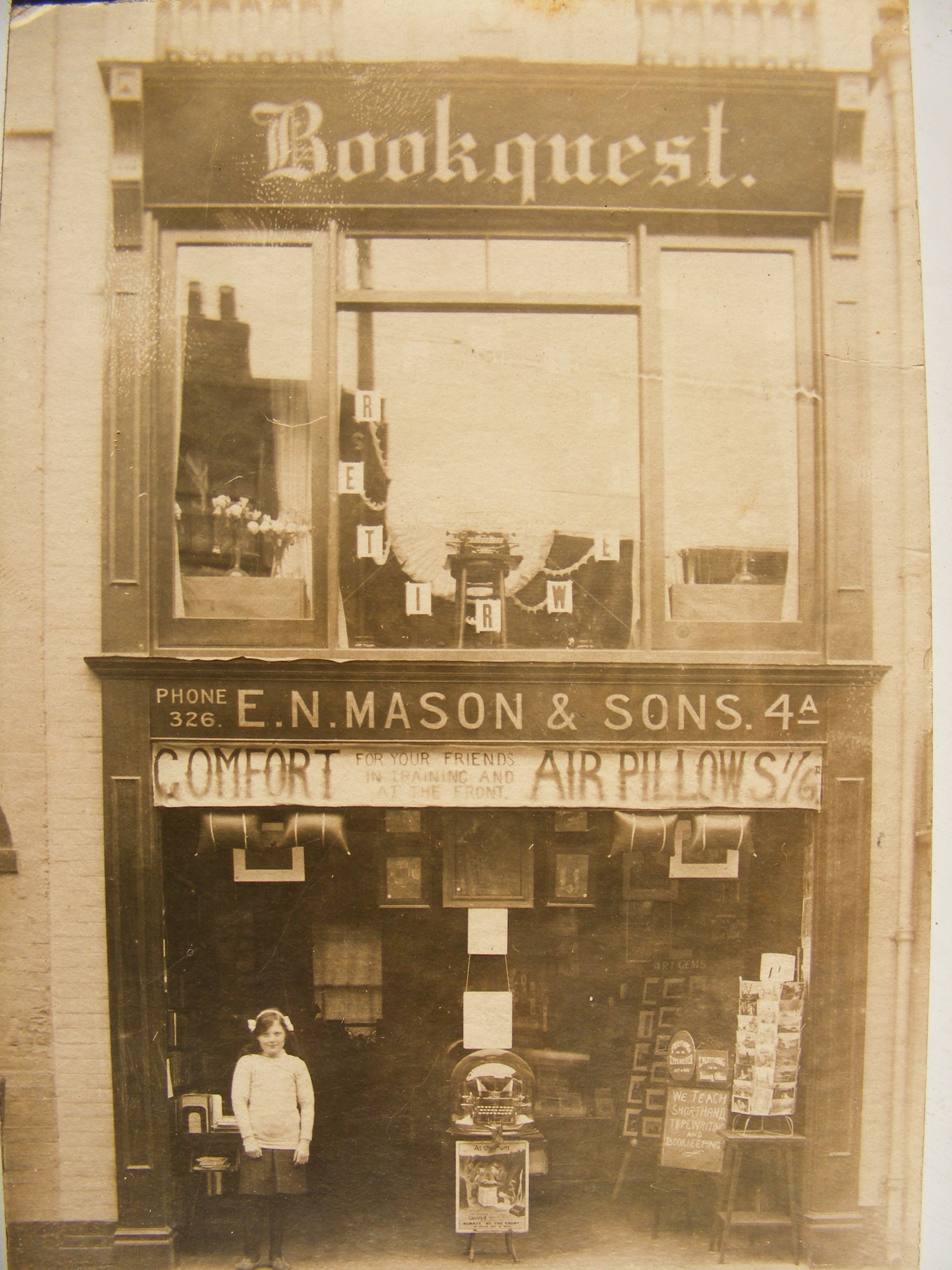
Historic photograph of E. N. Masons and Sons shop front

The business grew and thrived and became one of Colchester's major employers.

Mason continued to be invited to official dinners and business events such as the opening of new companies and premises. She was described by a prominent businessman, Percy Sanders, as "the best businesswoman I know", and he provided financial backing for the company. She was also invited to the Oyster feast of 1932, attended by Prince and Princess Arthur of Connaught.

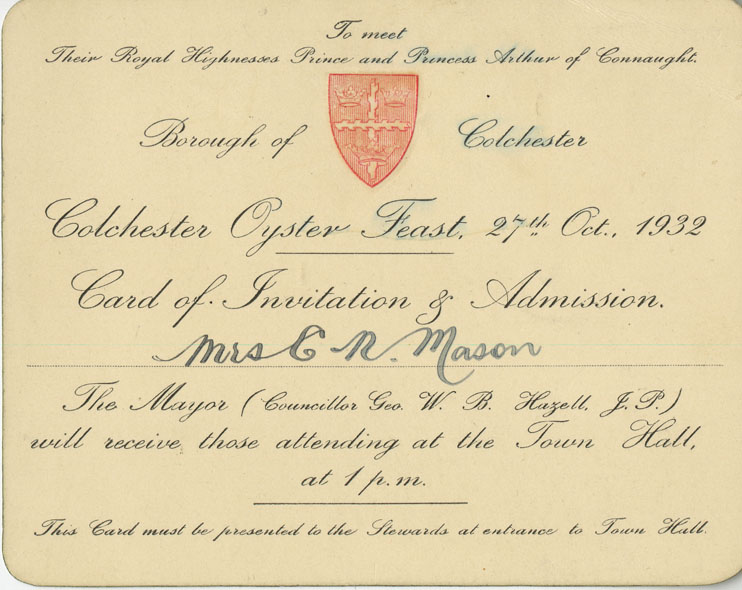
Oyster Feast Invitation addressed to Bertha Mason

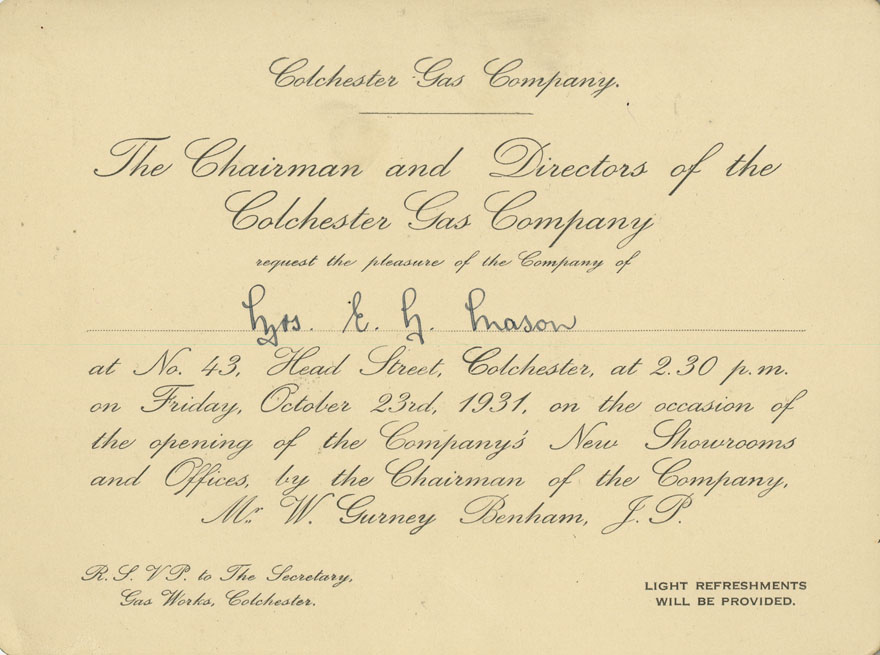
Bertha's Invitation to the opening of the new Gas Showrooms

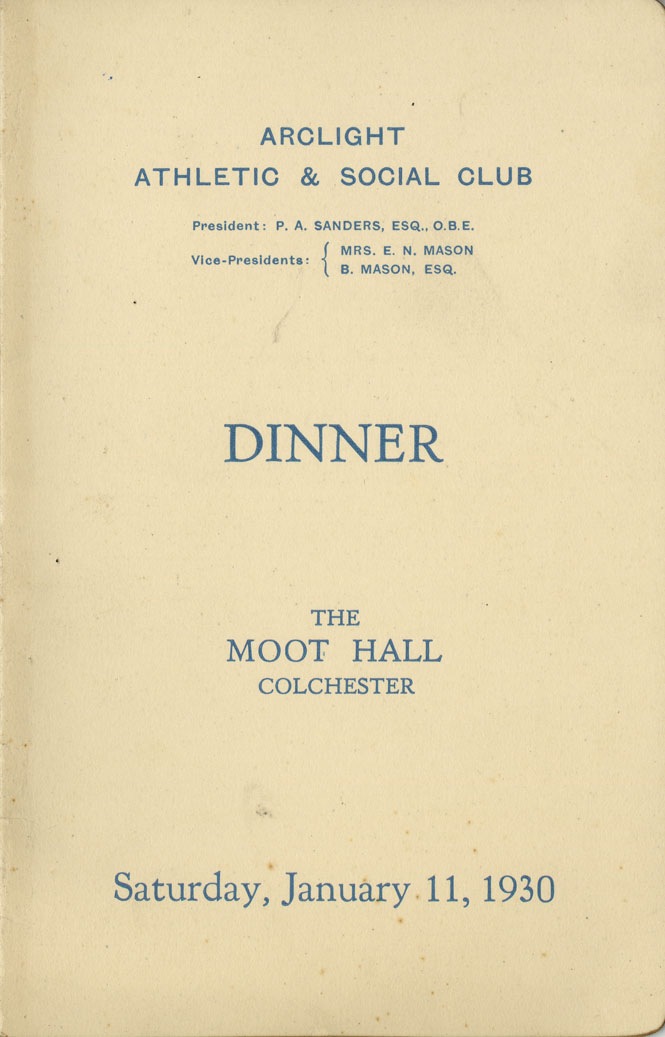
Arclight Athletic and Social Club dinner leaflet January 1930

== Family ==
Her son Conrad fought in the First World War. Bertha received many letters from him and cared for him while he was away, sending him whatever it was that he requested, whether that was chocolate or a new cooking stove. While Conrad was away he had concerns for the woman he liked, who was being treated poorly by the people around her; Bertha offered to give the girl a place to stay with them if she needed it as Conrad acknowledged and thanked her for this in one of his letters.

The letters also suggest that while he was away she suffered from some health issues – mainly colds and some leg-related pain. The majority of these letters were sent and received in the period just after her husband's death in 1914 and she appears to be the head of the family at this point, as well as looking after the business.

Conrad died in Belgium in 1917, leaving Bertha and her second son, Bernard, to continue with the business.

Her third son, Eudo, became a German scholar and professor at Edinburgh University.

== Arclight Works ==
The E. N Mason & Sons factory was situated in the Arclight Works on Maidenburgh Street in Colchester (the present Museum Resource Centre in Ryegate Road having been part of the works) between 1921 and 1938 before it moved to Cowdray Avenue.

Andrew Chignell, an employee at the firm (born in 1916) was employed by Mason's through the Juvenile Labour Exchange. He spent sixteen months working in the coating department and then got an apprenticeship in the bookbinding department for seven years.

At the end of twelve months, employees would write a letter to Mr. Mason explaining who they were and would request a pay increase – Chignell received a rise each year for seven years. Chignell worked there for forty years.

There was a social club which cost 3p a week – two football teams, one cricket team, a swimming baths ticket, a firm outing in January, and summer outings. He described the new factory as a "huge improvement on the old one".

According to Chignell, workers at Mason's were not highly paid, but the majority were fulfilled by their jobs.

During the Second World War, Mason's went on to produce paper for maps and blueprints, portable photocopiers for use in lorries, as well as equipment for aircraft reconnaissance and tank landing craft.

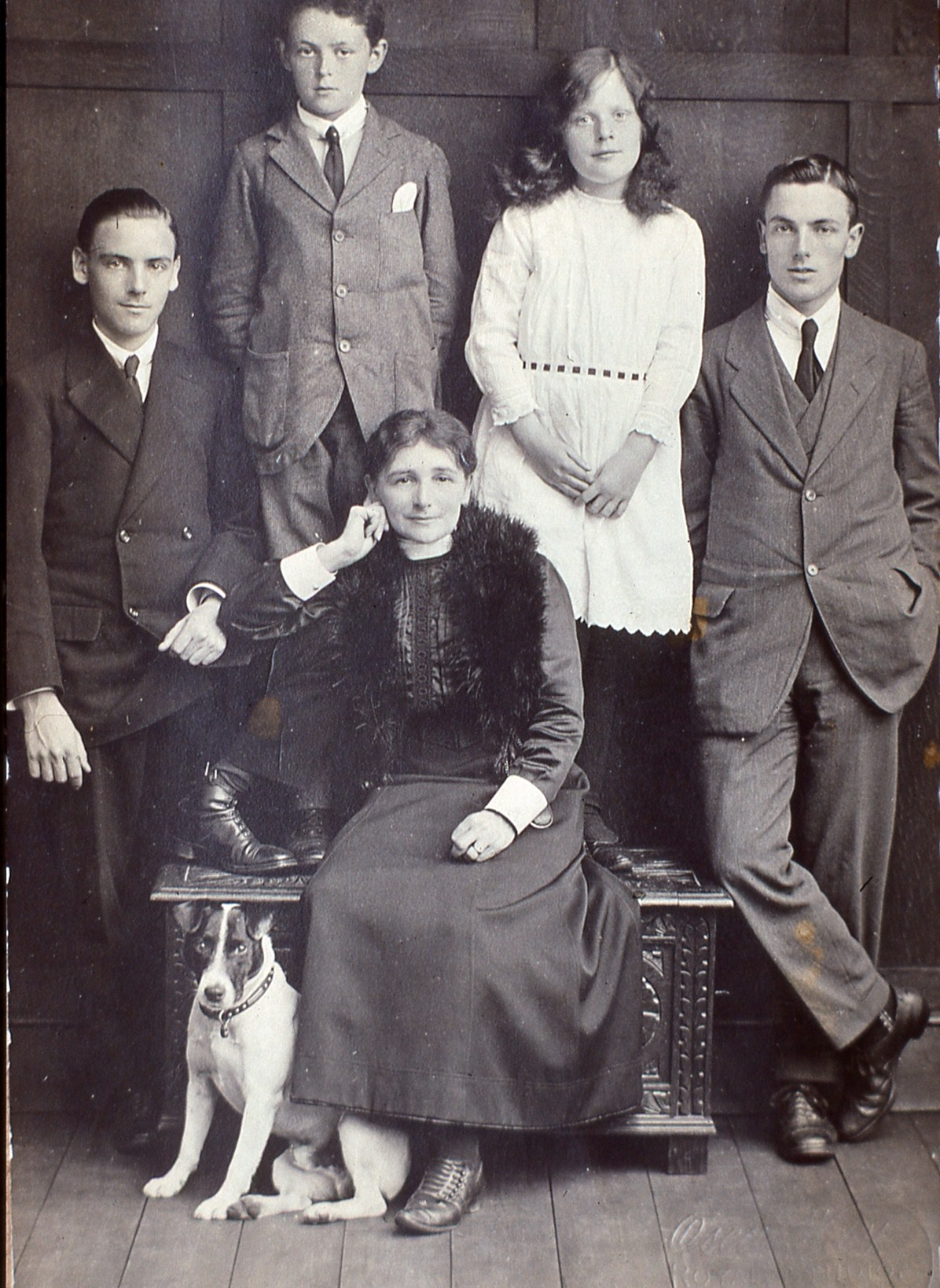
The Mason Family of Colchester

== Funeral ==
Bertha Mason died on 12 March 1937, and her funeral took place at St Nicholas' Church, High Street, Colchester. The funeral was attended by her employees who lined the road to the cemetery as the coffin was taken there. She is buried in Colchester Cemetery.

A sculptural bust of her was incorporated into the iron gates at the new factory in Cowdray Avenue, but unfortunately, she died before it opened. One of her main aims was completing the new factory, which she was unable to see fulfilled.
