= St Martin's Church, Colchester =

Coordinates: 51.8909°N 0.8994°E

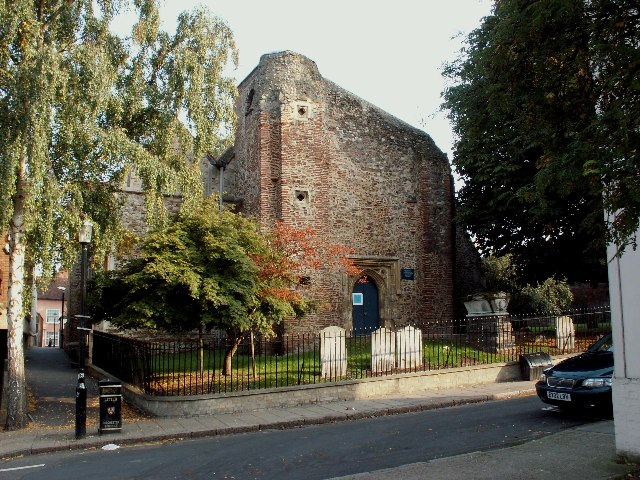
- Truncated tower of St Martin's Church, Colchester

- Location in Essex
- OS grid reference: TL 996 255
- Location: Colchester, Essex
- Country: England
- Denomination: Eastern Orthodox
- Website: Churches Conservation Trust

History
- Dedication: Saint Martin

Architecture
- Functional status: Redundant
- Heritage designation: Grade II*
- Designated: 2 December 1971
- Architectural type: Church
- Style: Norman, Gothic

Specifications
- Materials: Flint rubble, tiled roofs

St Martin's Church is an active Orthodox church, in the Antiochian Archdiocese of the British Isles and Ireland, in the city of Colchester, Essex, England. It is recorded in the National Heritage List for England as a designated Grade II* listed building. The church stands in the centre of the city, near the town hall.

== History ==
The nave and the tower of the church date from the 12th century. The aisles, the transepts, and the chancel were added in the 14th century. The tower was damaged in 1648 during the Civil War, and has never been repaired. Following this damage, the church fell into disrepair, and in 1748 the historian Philip Morant wrote that it was in a ruinous condition and that no services were being held in it. A considerable restoration took place during the late 19th century, during which the architect Giles Gilbert Scott revealed the wagon roof in the chancel. An ambitious plan of restoration was later prepared by Rev Ernest Geldart, but it was never realised. The church then became neglected again, and in 1953 it was declared redundant.

The church was used by a theatre group between 1957 and 1987, but by the latter date it had become structurally unsafe. It then continued to deteriorate until it was vested in the Churches Conservation Trust in 1996. By this time some emergency repairs had been carried out, which were financed by English Heritage. The Trust then continued to repair the building, planning this in two phases. In the first phase, the church was made dry and stable. The second phase involved cleaning the interior of the church, including the wall paintings, limewashing the remainder of the walls that had been painted black by the theatre company, refurbishing the vestry, and providing wheelchair access. This work was supported by a grant from the Heritage Lottery Fund and was completed in 2003. The work was granted a Colchester Civic Trust award later in that year. The church remains consecrated.

As of January 2022, the church was sold to the local St Helen's Chapel Antiochian Parish and is now used by them.

== Architecture ==
St Martin's is constructed in flint rubble and it has tiled roofs. The truncated tower and the nave are Norman in style. Many Roman stones have been incorporated into the walls of the tower and the nave. Internally, at the apex of the arch of the chancel roof is the carving of a Green Man. Two glazed plaques of encaustic tiles, surviving from Geldart's aborted restoration, are in the aisles.

== See also ==
- Antiochian Orthodox Church
