= Little Horkesley =

Civil parish in Essex, England

Coordinates: 51.952941°N 0.853672°E

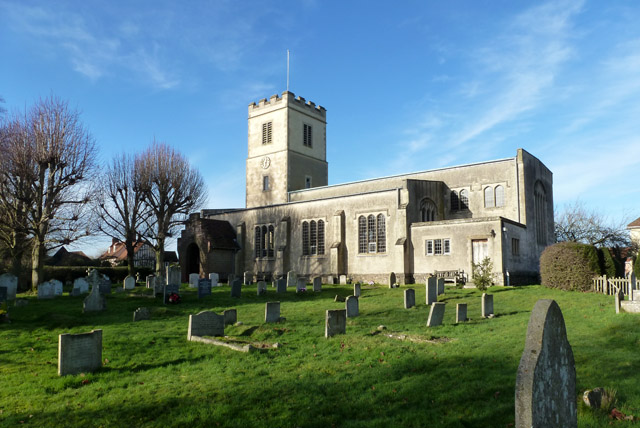
- St Peter and St Paul, Little Horkesley

- Location within Essex
- Population: 195 (Parish, 2021)
- OS grid reference: TL960321
- Civil parish: Little Horkesley
- District: City of Colchester
- Shire county: Essex
- Region: East
- Country: England
- Sovereign state: United Kingdom
- Post town: Colchester
- Postcode district: CO6
- Dialling code: 01206
- Police: Essex
- Fire: Essex
- Ambulance: East of England
- UK Parliament: South Suffolk

Little Horkesley is a village and civil parish in the City of Colchester district of Essex, England. It is situated approximately 4 miles north of Colchester on the south bank of the River Stour. At the 2021 census the parish had a population of 195.

In the time of Elizabeth I, the manor of Little Horkesley belonged to the Wentworth family, a branch of the notable Yorkshire family who became Earl of Stafford, and then passed by inheritance to a branch of the St. Lawrence family who had the title Baron and later Earl of Howth.
