= Colchester =

City in Essex, England

Coordinates: 51.8917°N 0.903°E

- City
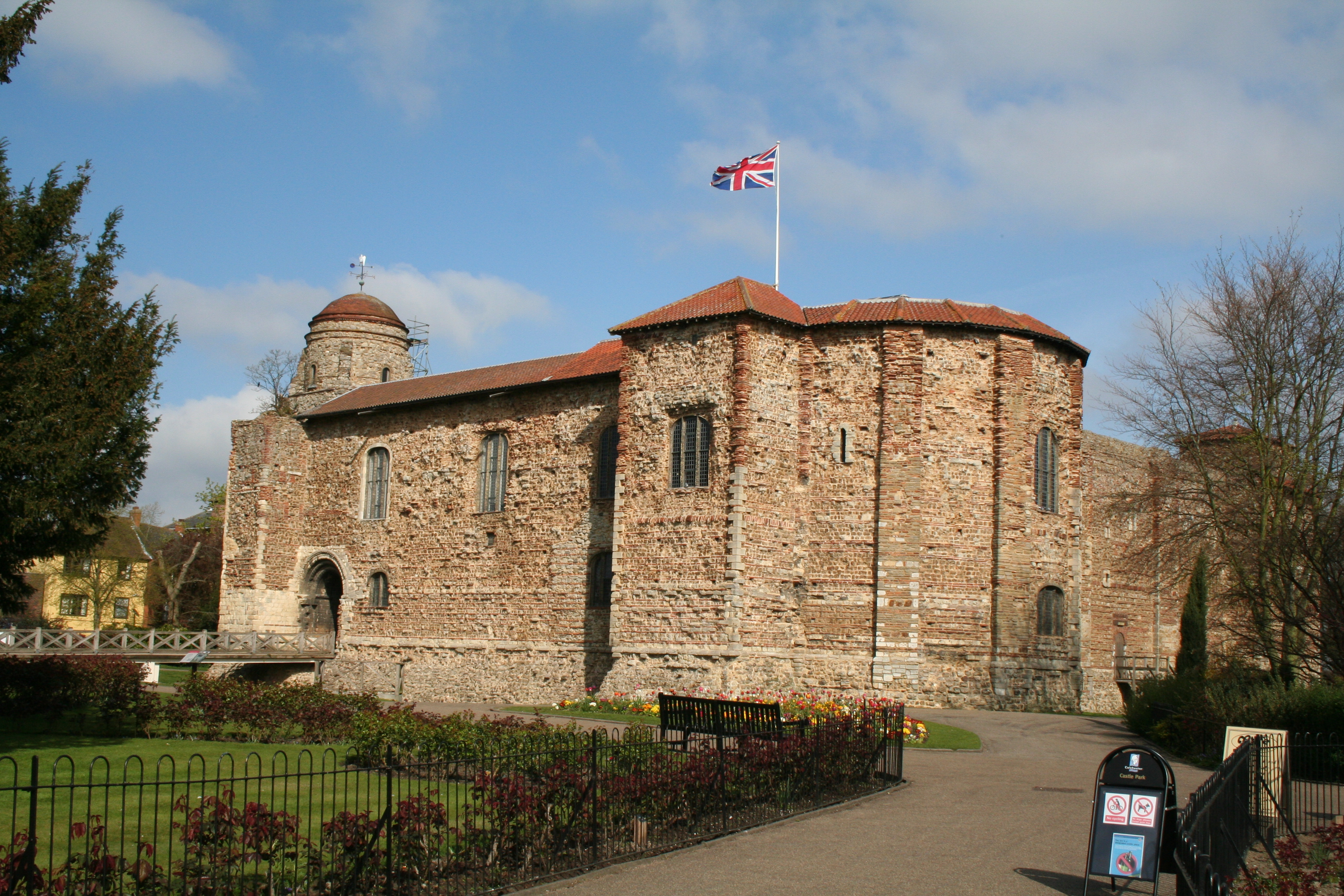
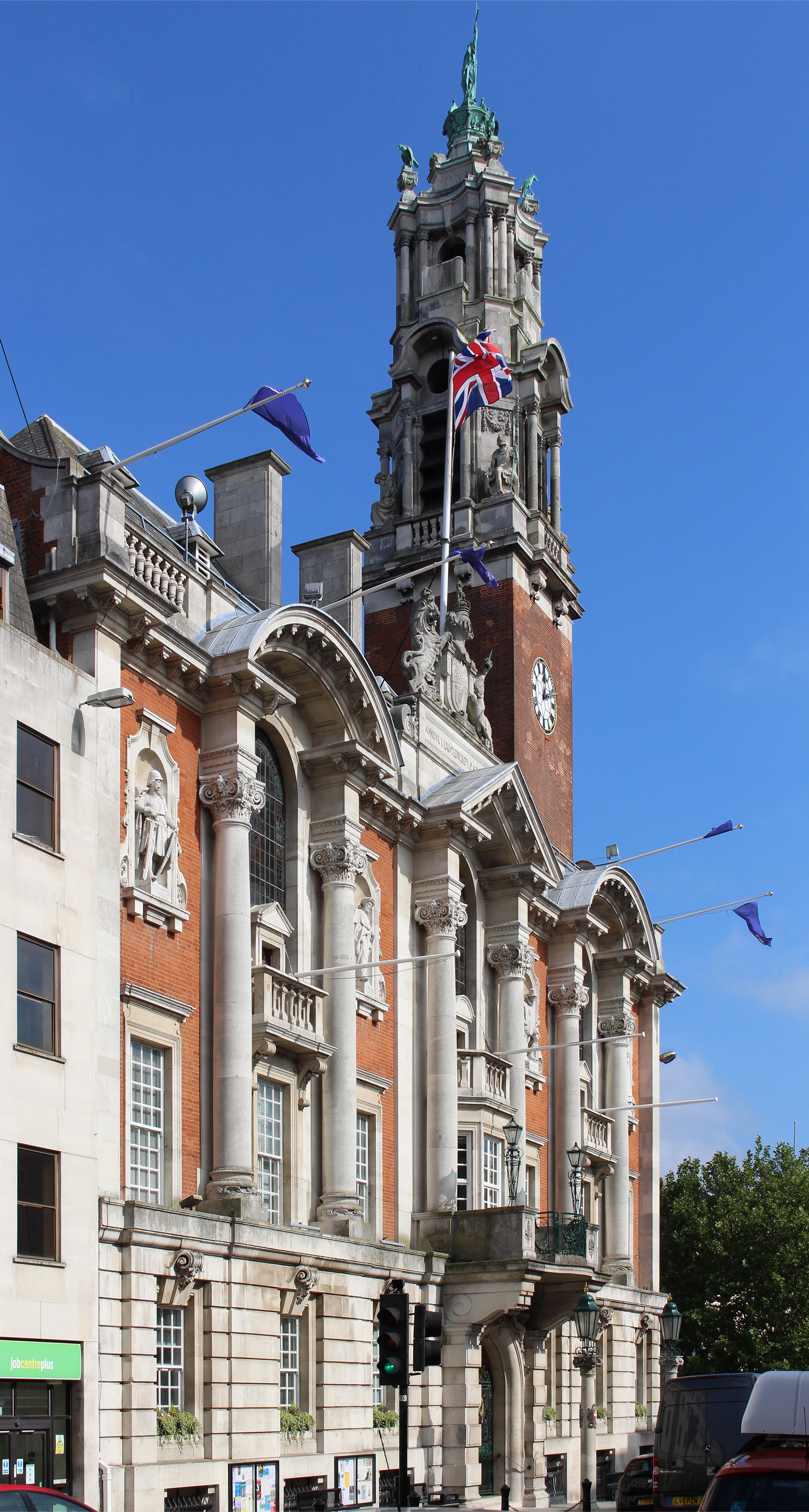
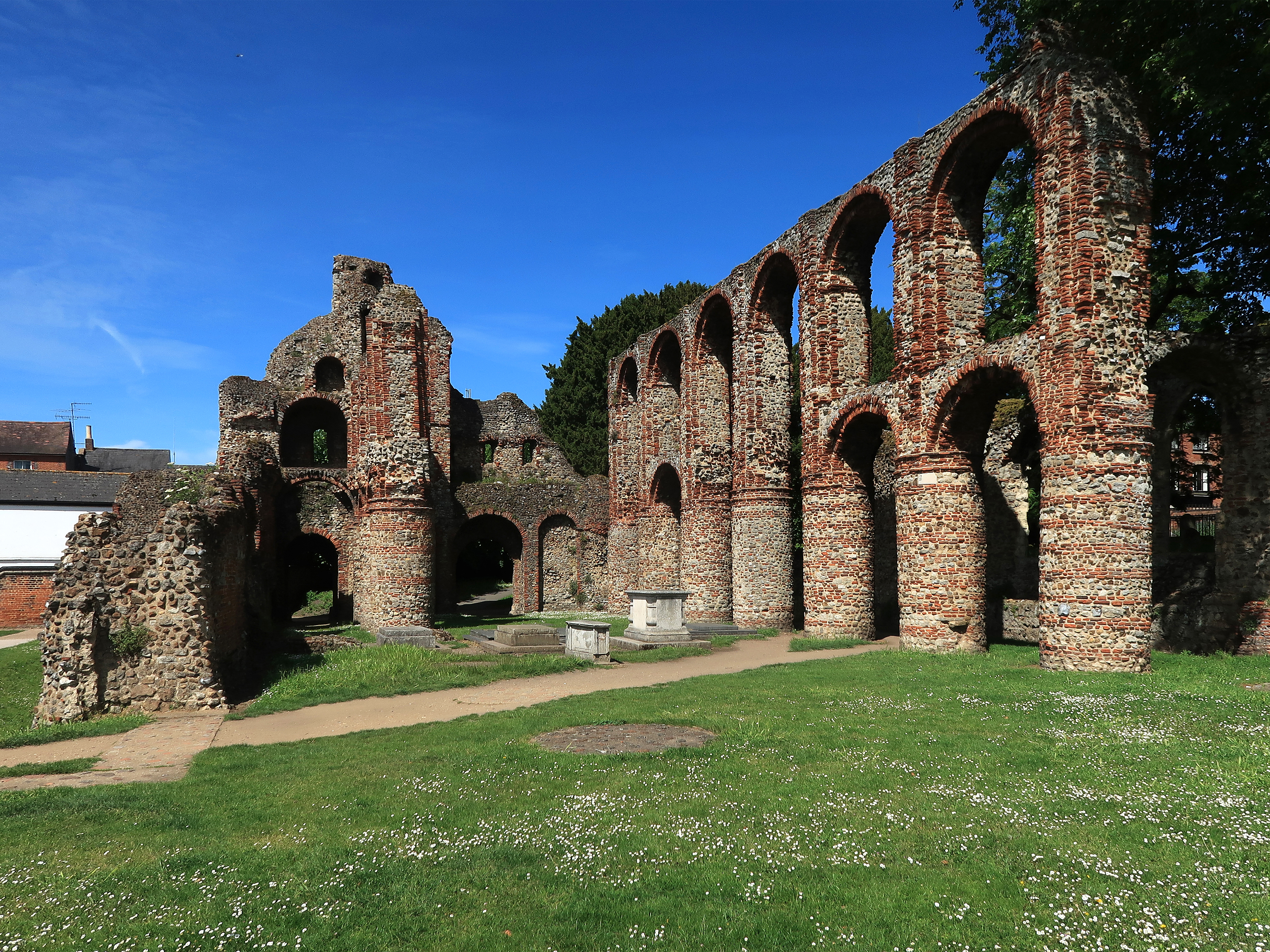
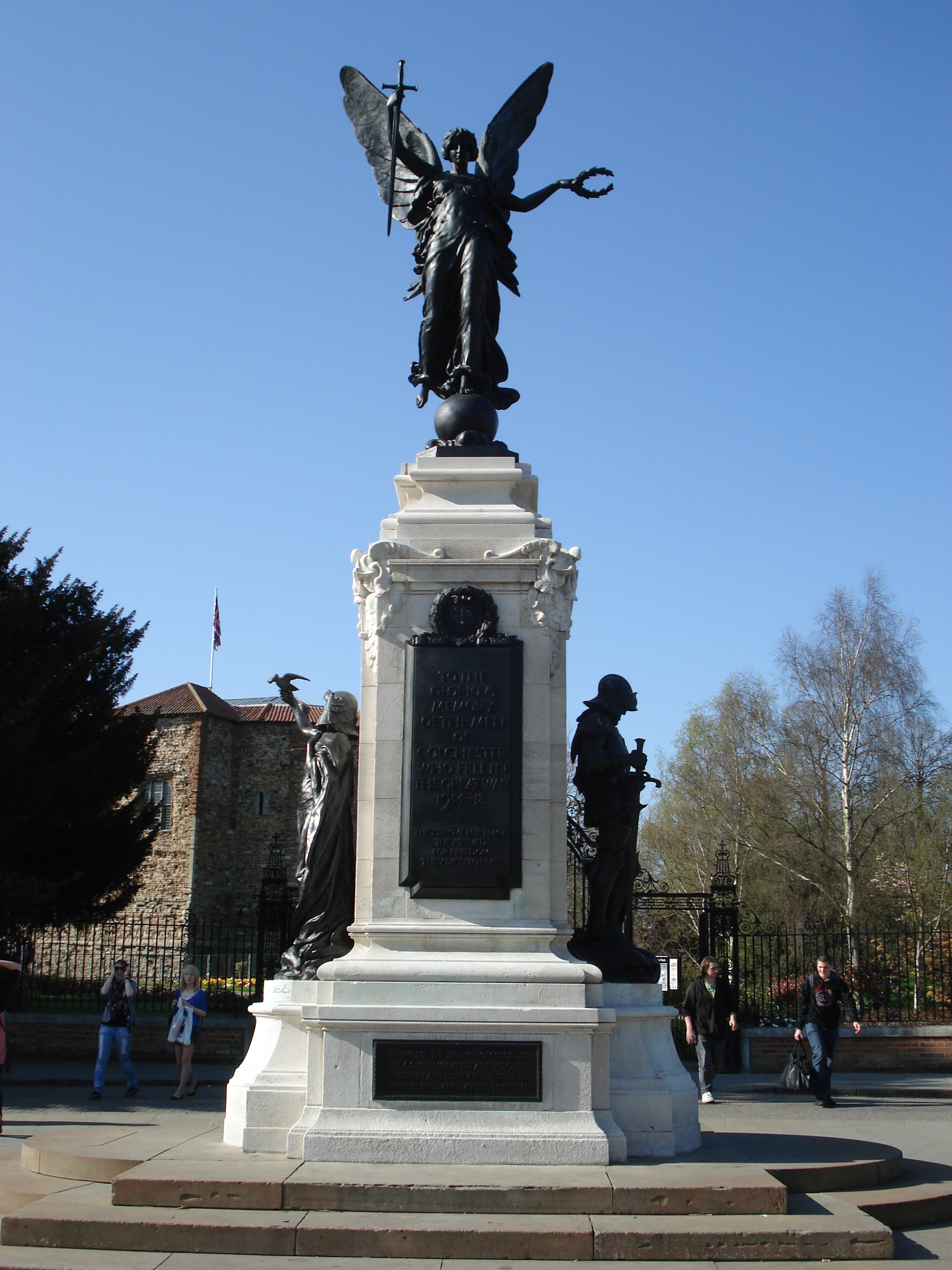
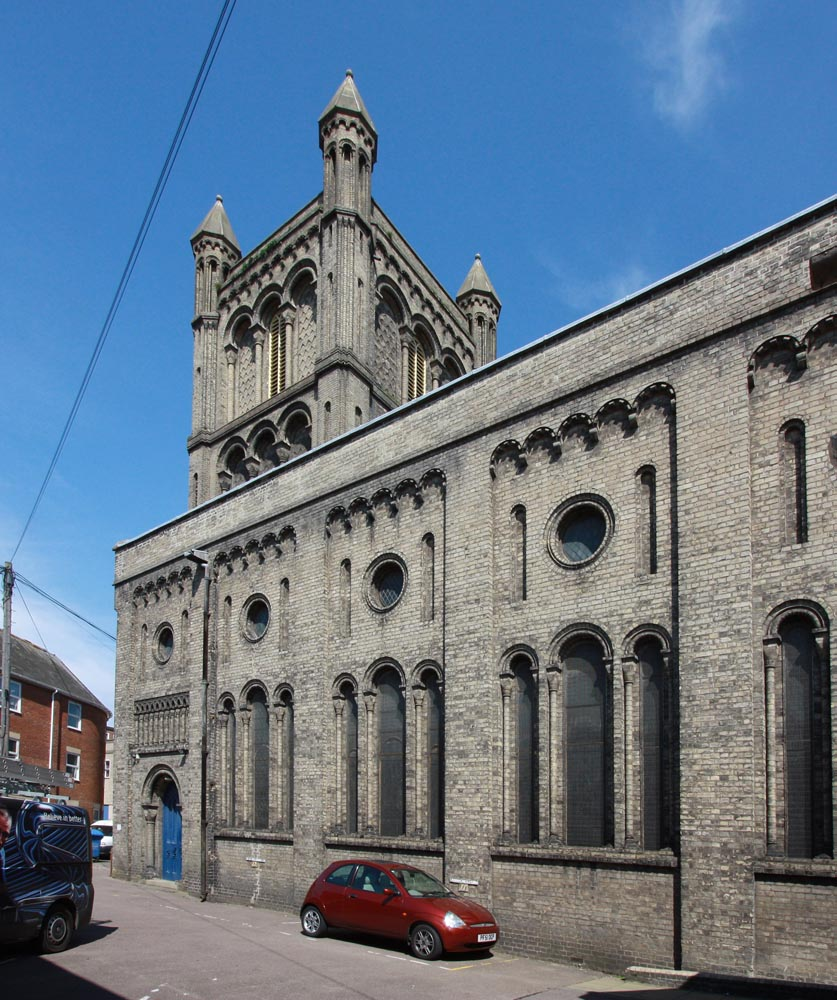
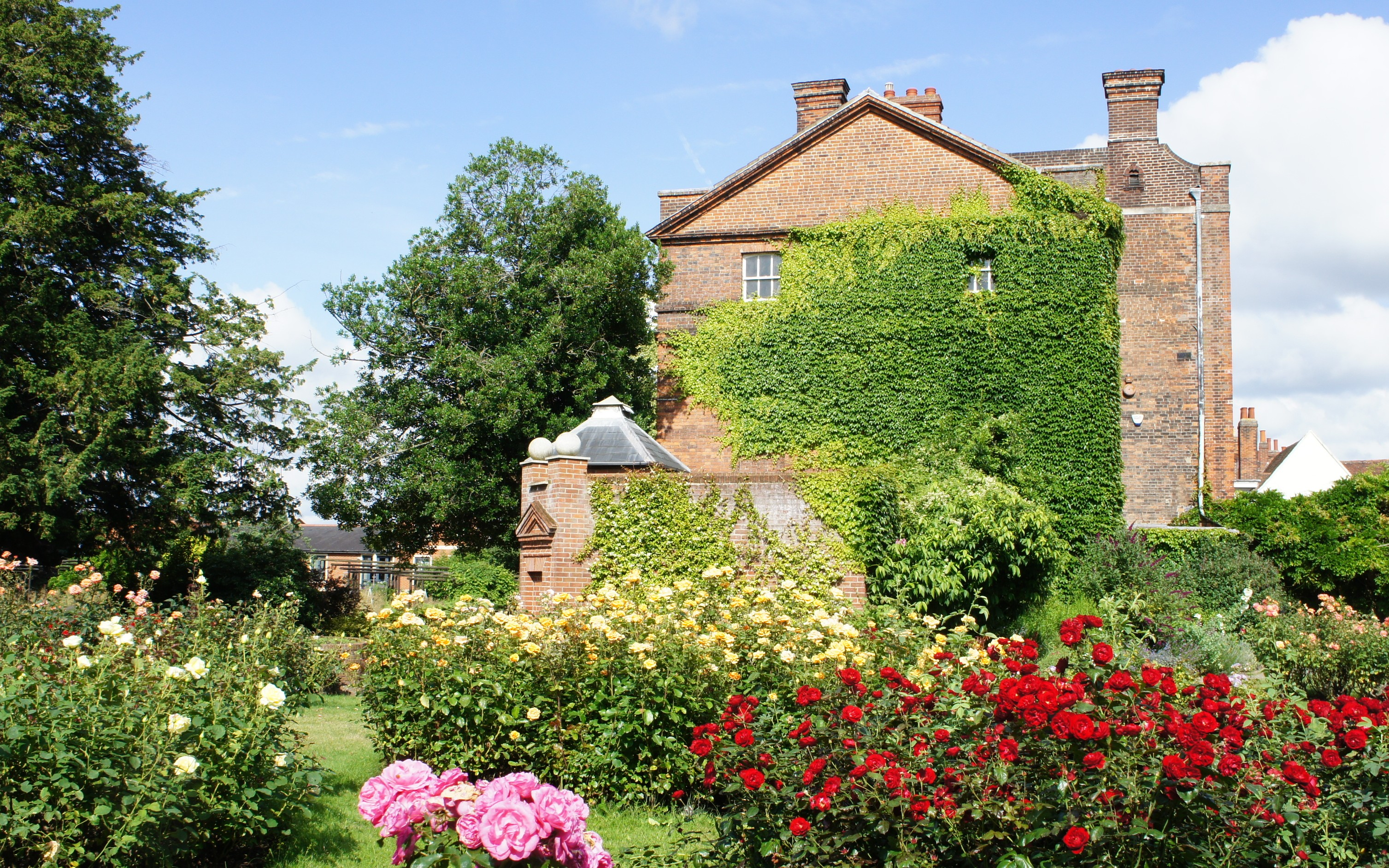
- Colchester Castle Town Hall St Botolph's Priory War Memorial St Botolph's Church Hollytrees Museum

- Location within Essex
- Population: 130,245 (Built up area, 2021)
- Founded: 1st century BC
- OS grid reference: TL998254
  - London: 56 mi (90 km) SW
- District: City of Colchester
- Shire county: Essex
- Region: East
- Country: England
- Sovereign state: United Kingdom
- Post town: COLCHESTER
- Postcode district: CO1–4
- Dialling code: 01206
- Police: Essex
- Fire: Essex
- Ambulance: East of England
- UK Parliament: Colchester
- Website: https://www.new.colchester.gov.uk/#gsc.tab=0

Colchester (/ˈkɒltʃɛstər, ˈkoʊl-, -tʃɪst-/ KO(H)L-chest-ər, -chist-) is a city in north-eastern Essex, England. (Note: The focus of this article is the built up area, which does not have legal city status of itself, but is widely regarded as a city since it is the main and nominate settlement in the borough of Colchester, which is the area that was formally granted the city status.) At the 2021 census the built up area had a population of 130,245, making it the second-largest settlement in Essex, after Southend-on-Sea. It gives its name to the wider Colchester local government district which also covers an extensive surrounding area. The demonym is Colcestrian.

Colchester occupies the site of Camulodunum, the first major city in Roman Britain and its first capital. Colchester therefore claims to be Britain's first city. It has been an important military base since the Roman era, with Colchester Garrison currently housing the 16th Air Assault Brigade.

The city is on the River Colne, and lies 50 miles (80 kilometres) north-east of London. It is connected to London by the A12 road and the Great Eastern Main Line railway. Colchester is less than 30 miles (50 km) from London Stansted Airport and 20 miles (30 km) from the port of Harwich.

Attractions in and around the city include St Botolph's Priory, Colchester Zoo, and several art galleries. Colchester Castle was constructed in the eleventh century on earlier Roman foundations; it now contains a museum. The main campus of the University of Essex is located between Colchester and Wivenhoe. Local government is the responsibility of Colchester City Council and Essex County Council.

== Name ==
There are several theories about the origin of the name Colchester. Some contend that is derived from the Latin words colonia (referring to a type of Roman settlement with rights equivalent to those of Roman citizens, one of which was believed to have been founded in the vicinity of Colchester) and castra, meaning fortifications (referring to the city walls, the oldest in Britain). The earliest forms of the name Colchester are Colenceaster and Colneceastre from the 10th century, with the modern spelling of Colchester being found in the 15th century. In this way of interpreting the name, the River Colne which runs through the area takes its name from Colonia as well. Cologne (German Köln) also gained its name from a similar etymology (from its Roman name Colonia Claudia Ara Agrippinensium).

Other etymologists are confident that the Colne's name is pre-Roman, sharing its origin with several other rivers Colne or Clun around Britain, and that Colchester is derived from Colne and Castra. Ekwall went as far as to say "it has often been held that Colchester contains as first element [Latin] colonia ... this derivation is ruled out of court by the fact that Colne is the name of several old villages situated a good many miles from Colchester and on the Colne. The identification of Colonia with Colchester is doubtful."

The popular association of the name with King Coel has no academic merit.

== History ==
=== Prehistory ===
The gravel hill upon which Colchester is built was formed in the Middle Pleistocene period and was shaped into a terrace between the Anglian glaciation and the Ipswichian glaciation by an ancient precursor to the River Colne. From these deposits Palaeolithic flint tools, including at least six Acheulian handaxes, have been found. Further flint tools made by hunter gatherers living in the Colne Valley during the Mesolithic have been discovered, including a tranchet axe from Middlewick. In the 1980s an archaeological inventory showed that over 800 shards of pottery from the Neolithic, Bronze Age and early Iron Age have been found within Colchester, along with many examples of worked flint. This included a pit found at Culver Street containing a ritually placed Neolithic grooved ware pot, as well as find spots containing later Deverel-Rimbury bucket urns. Colchester is surrounded by Neolithic and Bronze Age monuments that pre-date the town, including a Neolithic henge at Tendring, large Bronze Age barrow cemeteries at Dedham and Langham, and a larger example at Brightlingsea consisting of a cluster of 22 barrows.

=== Celtic origins ===
Flag of Colchester as flown from the City Hall, based on its coat of arms.

Colchester is said to be the oldest recorded town in Britain on the grounds that it was mentioned by Pliny the Elder, who died in AD 79, although the Celtic name of the town, Camulodunon appears on coins minted by tribal chieftain Tasciovanus in the period 20–10 BC. Before the Roman conquest of Britain it was already a centre of power for Cunobelin – known to Shakespeare as Cymbeline – king of the Catuvellauni (c. 5 BC – AD 40), who minted coins there. Its Celtic name, Camulodunon, variously represented as CA, CAM, CAMV, CAMVL and CAMVLODVNO on the coins of Cunobelinus, means 'the fortress of [the war god] Camulos'. During the 30s AD Camulodunon controlled a large swathe of Southern and Eastern Britain, with Cunobelin called "King of the Britons" by Roman writers. Camulodunon is sometimes popularly considered one of many possible sites around Britain for the legendary (perhaps mythical) Camelot of King Arthur, though the name Camelot (first mentioned by the 12th century French Arthurian storyteller Chrétien de Troyes) is most likely a corruption of Camlann, a now unknown location first mentioned in the 10th century Welsh annalistic text Annales Cambriae, identified as the place where Arthur was slain in battle.

=== Roman period ===
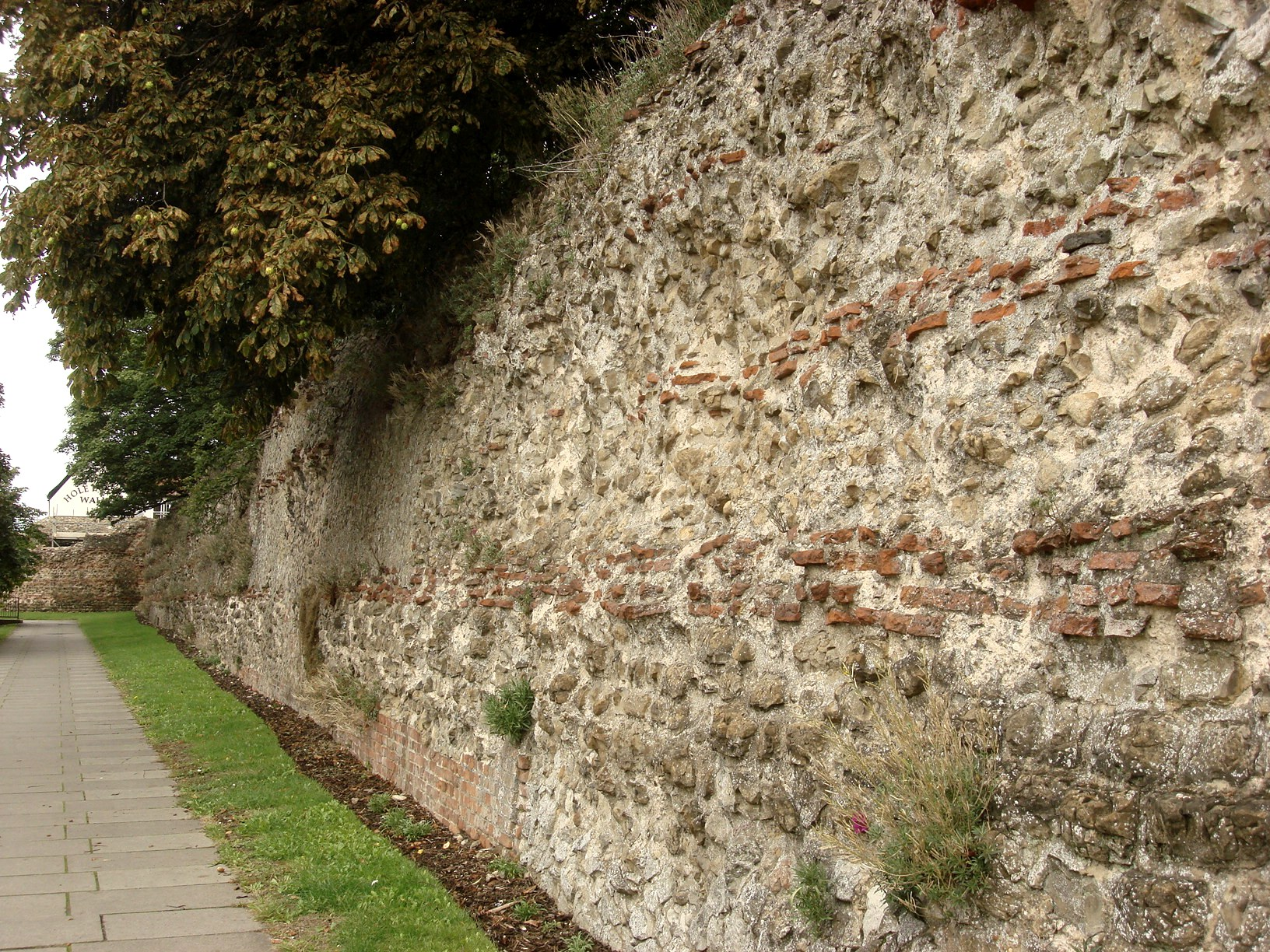
Part of the Roman walls in Colchester

Soon after the Roman conquest of Britain in AD 43, a Roman legionary fortress was established, the first in Britain. Later, when the Roman frontier moved outwards and the twentieth legion had moved to the west (c. AD 49), Camulodunum became a colonia named in a second-century inscription as Colonia Victricensis. This contained a large and elaborate Temple to the Divine Claudius, the largest classical-style temple in Britain, as well as at least seven other Romano-British temples. Colchester is home to two of the five Roman theatres found in Britain; the example at Gosbecks (site of the Iron Age royal farmstead) is the largest in Britain, able to seat 5,000.

Camulodunum served as a provincial Roman capital of Britain, but was attacked and destroyed during Boudica's rebellion in AD 61. Sometime after the destruction, London became the capital of the province of Britannia. Colchester's city walls c. 3,000 yd. long were built c.65–80 A.D. when the Roman town was rebuilt after the Boudicca rebellion. In 2004, Colchester Archaeological Trust discovered the remains of a Roman Circus (chariot race track) underneath the Garrison in Colchester, a unique find in Britain. The city reached its peak in the second and third centuries AD. It may have reached a population of 30,000 in that period.

In 2014 a hoard of jewellery, known as The Fenwick Hoard, named for the shop it was found beneath, was discovered in the town centre. The director of Colchester Archaeological Trust, Philip Crummy, described the hoard as being of "national importance and one of the finest ever uncovered in Britain".

==== Chariot Racing ====
A Roman circus was discovered in 2004 during archaeological investigations undertaken by Colchester Archaeological Trust prior to the redevelopment of Colchester Garrison, some 450m to the south of the walled part of the Roman town. Glass and pottery vessels decorated with scenes from chariot races had been discovered in the C19 and C20. Based on the foundations, it is estimated that the circus could accommodate around 8,000 spectators. Although dating evidence for the construction of the circus is limited and imprecise, it has been suggested that it was built in the AD C2; demolition may have started around the mid to late AD 270s.

Excavation has also confirmed that the circus was surrounded by a contemporary cemetery from which 516 burials have recovered.

=== Sub-Roman and Saxon period ===
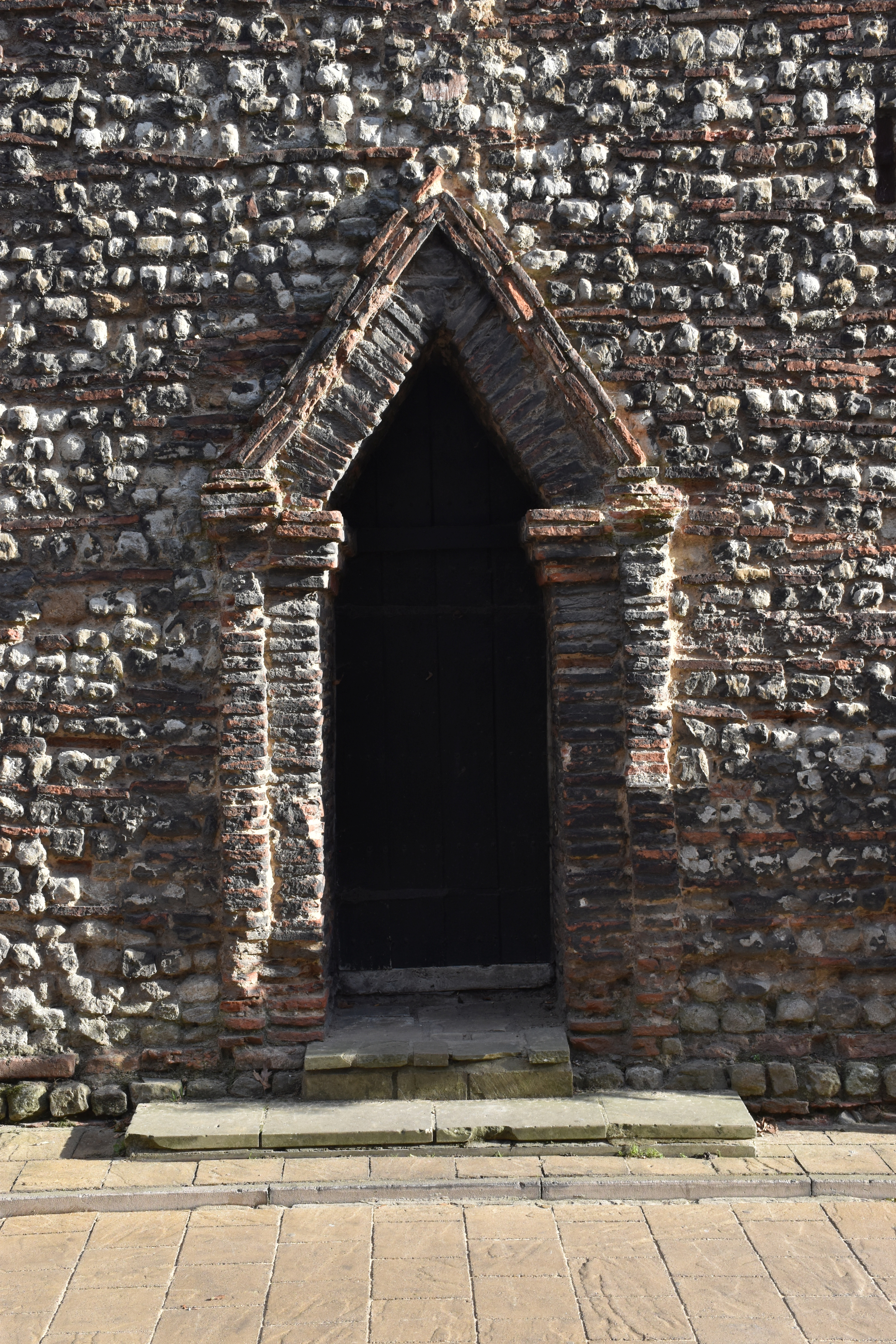
Saxon doorway in the tower of Holy Trinity Church, Colchester, incorporating Roman tiles

There is evidence of hasty re-organisation of Colchester's defences around 268–82 AD, followed later, during the fourth century, by the blocking of the Balkerne Gate.

The archaeologist Sir Mortimer Wheeler was the first to propose that the lack of early Anglo-Saxon finds in a triangle between London, Colchester and St Albans could indicate a 'sub-Roman triangle' where British rule continued after the arrival of the Anglo-Saxons. Since then excavations have revealed some early Saxon occupation, including a fifth-century wooden hut built on the ruins of a Roman house in present-day Lion Walk. Archaeological excavations have shown that public buildings were abandoned and is very doubtful whether Colchester survived as a settlement with any urban characteristics after the sixth century.

The chronology of its revival is obscure. But the ninth-century Historia Brittonum, attributed to Nennius, mentions the town, which it calls Cair Colun, in a list of the thirty most important cities in Britain. Colchester was in the area assigned to the Danelaw in c.880 and remained in Danish hands until 917 when it was besieged and recaptured by the army of Edward the Elder. The tenth-century Saxons called the town Colneceastre, which is directly equivalent to the Cair Colun of 'Nennius'. The tower of Holy Trinity Church is late Saxon work.

=== Medieval and Tudor periods ===
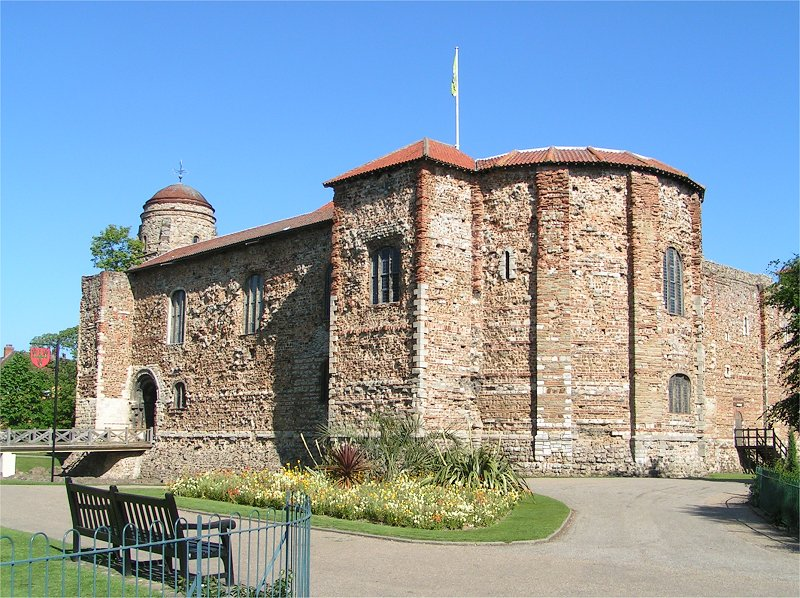
Colchester Castle, completed c. 1100 AD

Medieval Colchester's main landmark is Colchester Castle, which is an 11th-century Norman keep and built on top of the vaults of the old Roman temple. There are notable medieval ruins in Colchester, including the surviving gateway of the Benedictine abbey of St John the Baptist (known locally as "St John's Abbey"), and the ruins of the Augustinian priory of St Botolph (known locally as "St Botolph's Priory"). Many of Colchester's parish churches date from this period.

Colchester's medieval town seal incorporated the biblical text Intravit ihc: in quoddam castellum et mulier quedam excepit illum 'Jesus entered a certain castle and a woman there welcomed him' (Luke 10.38). This is a commonplace allegory in which a castle is likened to Mary's womb and explains the name of Maidenburgh St, neighbouring the castle.

In 1189, Colchester was granted its first known royal charter by King Richard I (Richard the Lionheart), although the wording suggests that it was based on an earlier one. It granted Colchester's burgesses the right to elect bailiffs and a justice. The borough celebrated the 800th anniversary of its charter in 1989.

Colchester developed rapidly during the later 14th century as a centre of the woollen cloth industry and became famous in many parts of Europe for its russets (fabrics of a grey-brown colour). This allowed the population to recover exceptionally rapidly from the effects of the Black Death, particularly by immigration into the town. Rovers Tye Farm, now a pub on Ipswich Road, has been documented as being established by 1353.

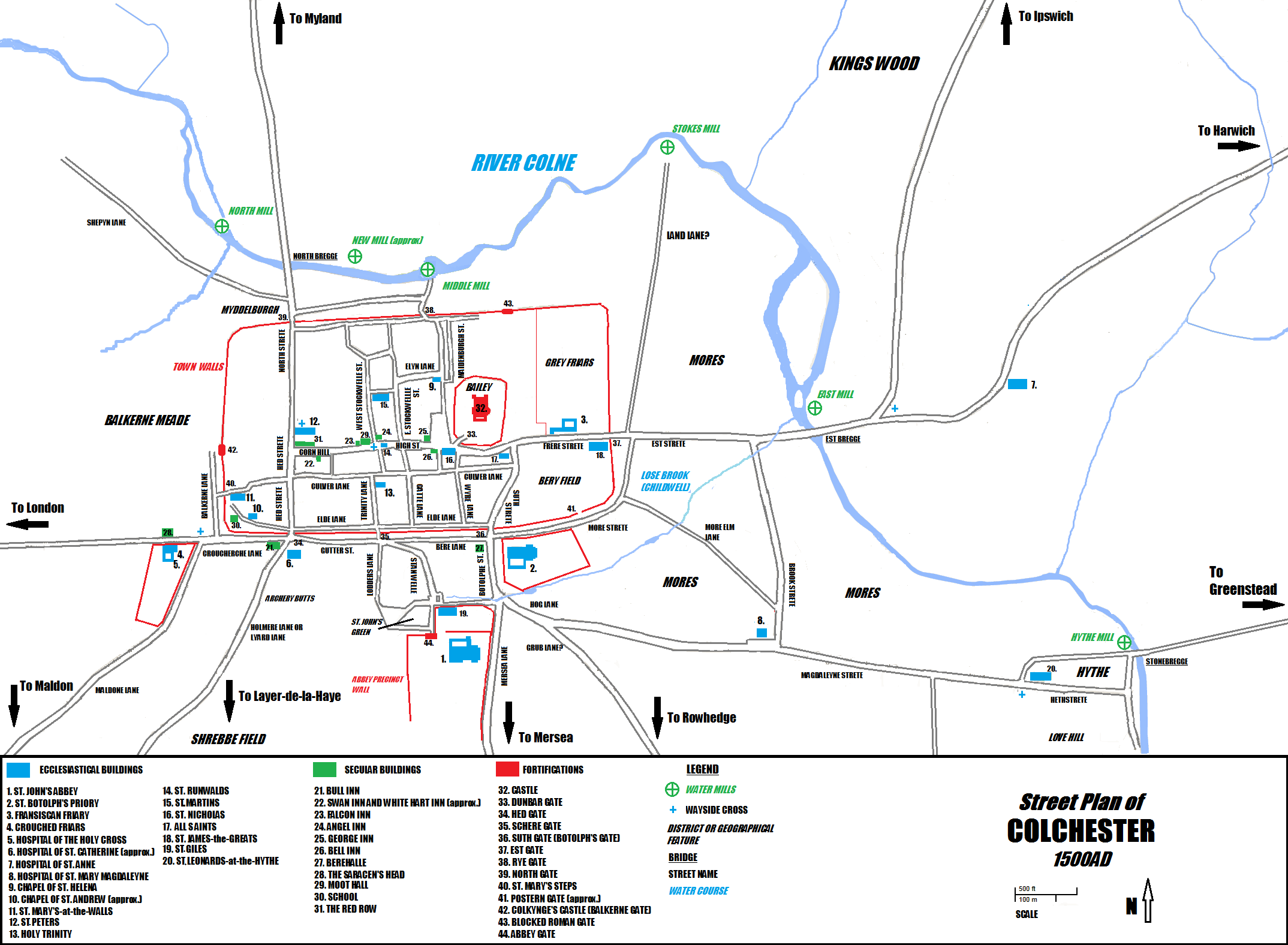
Colchester in 1500 AD

By the 'New Constitutions' of 1372, a borough council was instituted; the two bailiffs who represented the borough to the king were now expected to consult sixteen ordinary councillors and eight auditors (later called aldermen). Even though Colchester's fortunes were more mixed during the 15th century, it was still a more important place by the 16th century than it had been in the 13th. In 1334 it would not have ranked among England's wealthiest fifty towns, to judge from the taxation levied that year. By 1524, however, it ranked twelfth, as measured by its assessment to a lay subsidy.

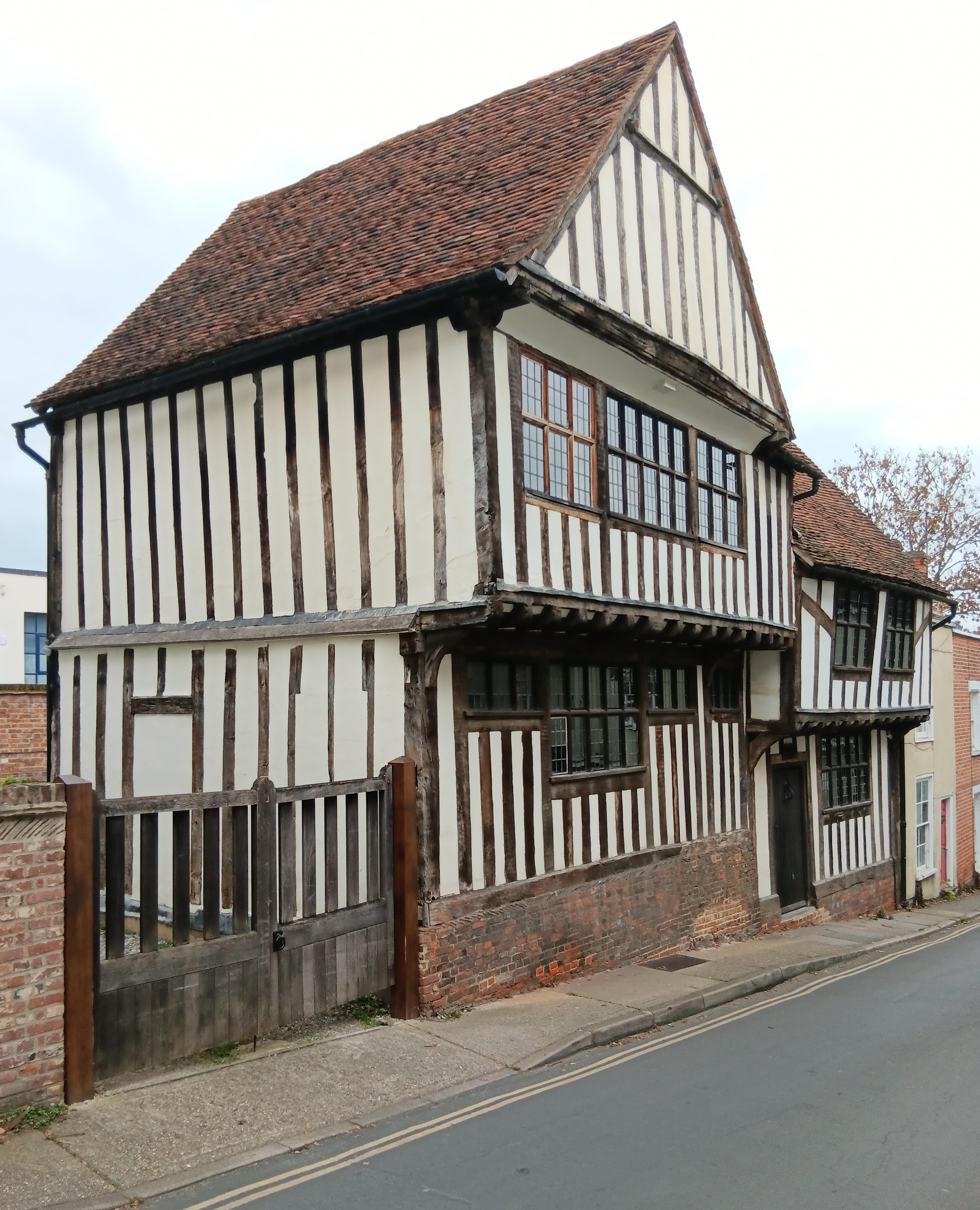
Peake's House, one of the Elizabethan houses in the Dutch Quarter

Between 1550 and 1600, a large number of weavers and clothmakers from Flanders emigrated to Colchester and the surrounding areas. They were famed for the production of "Bays and Says" cloths which were woven from wool and are normally associated with baize and serge although surviving examples show that they were rather different from their modern equivalents. An area in Colchester town centre is still known as the Dutch Quarter and many buildings there date from the Tudor period. During this period Colchester was one of the most prosperous wool towns in England and was also famed for its oysters. Flemish refugees in the 1560s brought innovations that revived the local cloth trade, establishing the Dutch Bay Hall for quality control of the textiles for which Colchester became famous. The old Roman wall runs along Northgate Street in the Dutch Quarter.

In the reign of Mary I (1553–1558) Colchester became a centre of Protestant "heresy" and in consequence at least 19 local people were burned at the stake at the castle, at first in front, later within the walls. They are commemorated on a tablet near the altar of St Peter's Church. (Sources: John Foxe, Book of Martyrs; Mark Byford, The Process of Reformation in a Tudor Town)

=== 17th and 18th century ===
Colchester Improvement Act 1623
- Act of Parliament
- Parliament of England
- Long title: An Act for the payringe and mainteyninge of the Haven River and Channell runing unto the Borowgh and Towne of Colchester in the Countie of Essex, and alsoe for the paveing of the said Towne.
- Citation: 21 Jas. 1. c. 34 Pr.
- Territorial extent: England and Wales

Dates
- Royal assent: 29 May 1624
- Commencement: 12 February 1624 (Note: Start of session.)
Other legislation
Relates to	Bays Regulation (Colchester) Act 1660

Status: Current legislation

Bays Regulation (Colchester) Act 1660
- Act of Parliament
- Parliament of England
- Long title: An Act for the regulating of the Trade of Bay-making, in the Dutch Bay Hall, in Colchester.
- Citation: 12 Cha. 2. c. 7 Pr. (Note: This is the citation in The Statutes of the Realm.); 12 Cha. 2. c. 22 (Note: This is the citation in The Statutes at Large.)
- Territorial extent: England and Wales

Dates
- Royal assent: 13 September 1660
- Commencement: 25 April 1660
Other legislation
Amended by	Statute Law Revision Act 1873
Relates to	Colchester Improvement Act 1623

Status: Amended

Text of statute as originally enacted

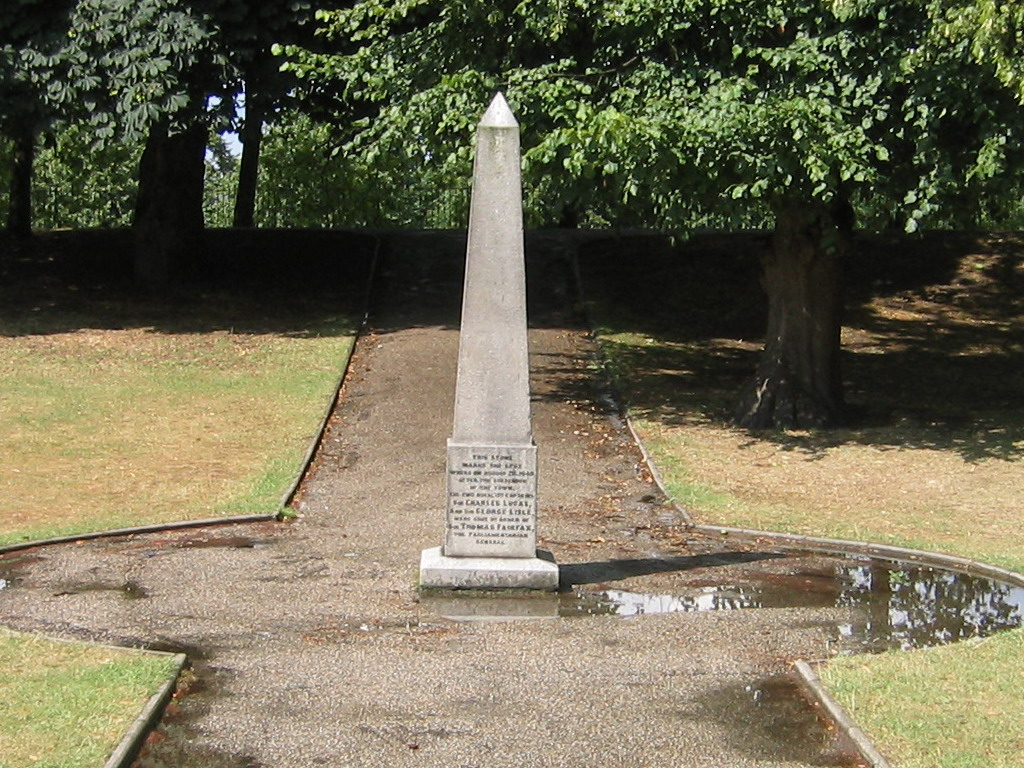
The place of execution of the Royalist soldiers Charles Lucas and George Lisle in 1648

The town saw the start of the Stour Valley riots of 1642, when the town house of John Lucas, 1st Baron Lucas of Shenfield was attacked by a large crowd. In 1648, during the Second English Civil War, a Royalist army led by Lord Goring entered the town. A pursuing Parliamentary army led by Thomas Fairfax and Henry Ireton surrounded the town for eleven and a half weeks, a period known as the Siege of Colchester. It started on 13 June. The Royalists surrendered in the late summer (on 27 August Lord Goring signed the surrender document in the Kings Head Inn) and Charles Lucas and George Lisle were executed in the grounds of Colchester Castle. A small obelisk marks the spot where they fell.

Daniel Defoe mentions in A tour through England and Wales that the town lost 5259 people to the plague in 1665, "more in proportion than any of its neighbours, or than the city of London". By the time he wrote this in 1722, however, he estimated its population to be around 40,000 (including "out-villages").

Between 1797 and 1815 Colchester was the HQ of the Army's Eastern District, had a garrison of up to 6,000, and played a main role in defence against a threatened French or Dutch invasion, At various times it was the base of such celebrated officers as Lord Cornwallis, Generals Sir James Craig and David Baird, and Captain William Napier. It was in a state of alarm during the invasion threat of 1803/4, a period well chronicled by the contemporary local author Jane Taylor.

=== Victorian period ===
Significant Victorian landmarks include Colchester Town Hall, the Jumbo Water Tower and the Albert Hall.

In 1884, the area was struck by the Colchester earthquake, estimated to have been 4.7 on the Richter Scale causing extensive regional damage.

The Paxman diesels business has been associated with Colchester since 1865 when James Noah Paxman founded a partnership with the brothers Henry and Charles Davey ('Davey, Paxman, and Davey') and opened the Standard Ironworks. In 1925, Paxman produced its first spring injection oil engine and joined the English Electric Diesel Group in 1966 – later becoming part of the GEC Group. Since the 1930s the Paxman company's main business has been the production of diesel engines.

=== 20th century and later ===
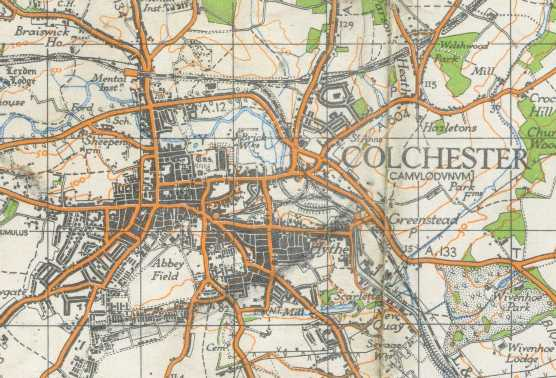
A map of Colchester from 1940

In the early 20th century Colchester lobbied to be the seat for a new Church of England diocese for Essex, to be split off from the existing Diocese of Rochester. The bid was unsuccessful, with county town Chelmsford forming the seat of the new diocese.

In the 2nd World War Colchester's main significance lay in its infantry and light-anti-aircraft training units and in the Paxman factory, which supplied a large proportion of the engines for British submarines and landing craft. Occasionally hit by stray single German aircraft in 1940 and 1941, in 1942 more serious attempts to bomb its industries were made by the Luftwaffe. None of these attacks hit their targets, but a raid on 11 August bombed Severalls Hospital and killed 38 elderly patients. In February 1944 a single raider caused a huge fire in the St Botolph's area which gutted warehouses, shops and part of Paxman's Britannia Works. The total wartime bombing death toll in the borough was 55.

The University of Essex was established at Wivenhoe Park in 1961. The £22.7M 8-mile (13-kilometre) A120 Colchester Eastern Bypass opened in June 1982.

On 18 November 1989, a booby-trap bomb exploded under a car in Goojerat barracks, Colchester Garrison, injuring Staff Sergeant Andy Mudd of the Royal Military Police, who lost both his legs and two fingers in the blast. His wife, Maggie, received facial injuries in the attack. The Provisional IRA claimed responsibility for the bombing the next day.In June 1998 the Criminal Injuries Compensation Authority awarded Mr Mudd £819,000 in damages.

Colchester and the surrounding area is currently undergoing significant regeneration, including controversial greenfield residential development in Mile End and Braiswick. At the time of the 2011 United Kingdom census, Colchester and its surrounding built up area had a population of 121,859, marking a considerable rise from the previous census and with considerable development since 2001 and ongoing building plans; it has been named as one of Britain's fastest growing towns. The local football team, Colchester United, moved into a brand new stadium at Cuckoo Farm in 2008.

On 20 May 2022, it was announced that as part of the Platinum Jubilee Civic Honours, what was then the Borough of Colchester would receive city status. It was slated to receive the status formally by letters patent on 12 September 2022, however following the death of Queen Elizabeth II, the ceremony was postponed. On 29 September 2022, the letters patent was made public, with Colchester receiving city status dated 5 September 2022 by the late Queen. Colchester officially received city status on 23 November 2022. Colchester was visited by King Charles III on 7 March 2023, in order to congratulate Colchester on receiving city status.

== Garrison ==
Insignia of 16 Airborne Brigade, based at Colchester.

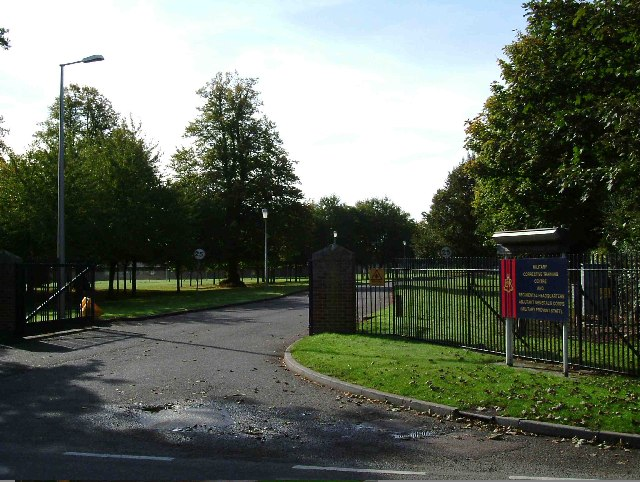
The military corrective training centre

Colchester has been an important military garrison since the Roman era. The Colchester Garrison is currently home to the 16th Air Assault Brigade. The Army's only military corrective training centre, known colloquially within the forces and locally as "The Glasshouse" after the original military prison in Aldershot, is in Berechurch Hall Road, on the outskirts of Colchester. The centre holds men and women from all three services who are sentenced to serve periods of detention.

From 1998 to 2008, the garrison area underwent massive redevelopment. A lot of the Ministry of Defence land was sold for private housing development and parts of the garrison were moved. Many parts of the garrison now stand empty awaiting the second phase of the development.

Since 2006, Colchester has been one of 12 places in the UK where Royal Salutes are fired to mark Royal anniversaries and visits by foreign heads of state. From 2009, these salutes have taken place in Castle Park.

BFBS Radio broadcasts from studios on the base on 107.0FM as part of its UK Bases network.

== Governance ==
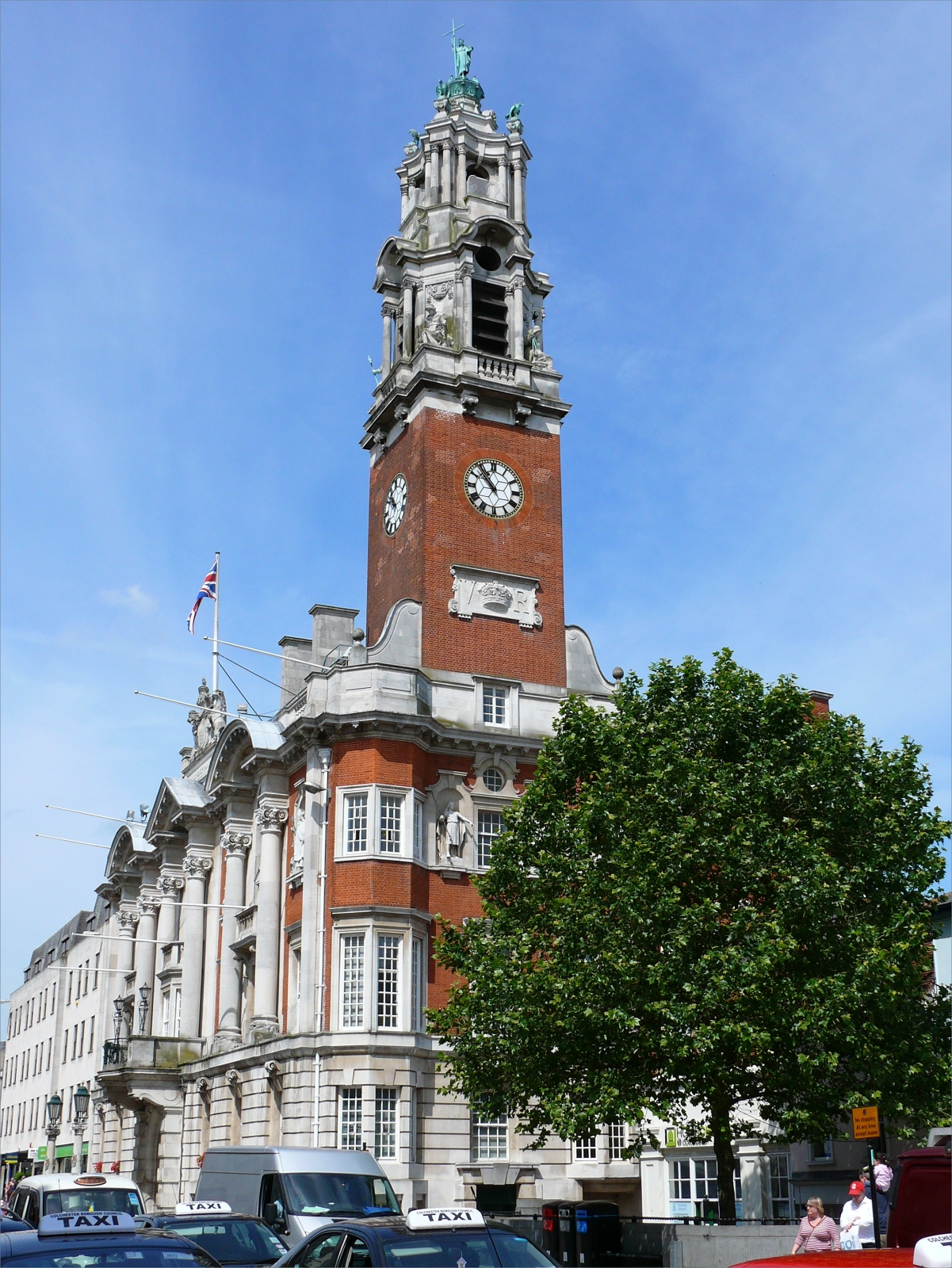
Colchester Town Hall

There are two main tiers of local government covering Colchester, at district and county level: Colchester City Council and Essex County Council. Most of the built up area is unparished, but there are two civil parishes covering outer parts of it, at Myland to the north and Stanway to the west. The city council meets at Colchester Town Hall and has its main offices at Rowan House at 33 Sheepen Road.

For national elections, most of the area forms part of the Colchester constituency, although some south-eastern suburbs fall within the Harwich and North Essex constituency. The Member of Parliament for the Colchester constituency is Pam Cox of the Labour Party.

=== Administrative history ===
Colchester was an ancient borough with urban forms of local government from Saxon times. Burgesses were already established by the time of the Domesday survey of 1086. The earliest known borough charter dates from 1189, but that charter appears to confirm pre-existing borough rights rather than being the foundation of a new borough. By the 14th century the borough covered sixteen parishes. Twelve of the parishes were named after Colchester's medieval parish churches in and around the walled town, and the other four (Berechurch, Greenstead, Lexden and Myland) were described as the "outlying parishes", covering areas that were more peripheral or suburban to the main part of the town as it then was.

Several charters were granted to the borough over time amending how it operated. A 1635 charter from Charles I gave the right to appoint a High Steward of Colchester. It is now essentially an honorary post. The current high steward is the former MP, Liberal Democrat Sir Bob Russell, appointed in 2015.

The borough was reformed in 1836 to become a municipal borough under the Municipal Corporations Act 1835, which standardised the way most boroughs operated across the country. All the civil parishes within the borough were united into a single parish matching the borough in 1897. The borough boundaries, which had been unchanged since the 14th century, saw some relatively minor adjustments in 1934.

The municipal borough was abolished in 1974 under the Local Government Act 1972. The area merged with the surrounding Lexden and Winstree Rural District and the two urban districts of West Mersea and Wivenhoe to become a new non-metropolitan district with borough status called Colchester.

The unparished area (red) within the modern district. The unparished area broadly corresponds to the pre-1974 borough, minus the new parish of Myland to the north which was created in 1999.

The area of the pre-1974 borough was left unparished as a result of the 1974 reforms. A new civil parish called Myland was subsequently created in 1999 from part of the area of the pre-1974 borough. Stanway to the west was not part of the pre-1974 borough, but the urban area has grown into Stanway parish and the Office for National Statistics now classes Stanway as part of the Colchester built up area.

== Culture ==
=== Museums ===
Colchester houses several museums. The Castle Museum, found within Colchester Castle, features an extensive exhibit on Roman Colchester. Nearby are Hollytrees Museum, a social history museum with children's exhibits in the former home of Charles Gray, and the Natural History Museum, located in the former All Saints' Church. The Colchester Archaeological Trust have opened a visitor centre and museum at the former Cavalry Barracks to display finds from the Roman Circus, with replicas and models of the circus, as well as finds from the nearby Roman cemeteries. In 2014 brick and marble columns from the monumental façade of the precinct of the Temple of Claudius were discovered behind the High Street, with plans to make them visible to the public.

=== Arts ===
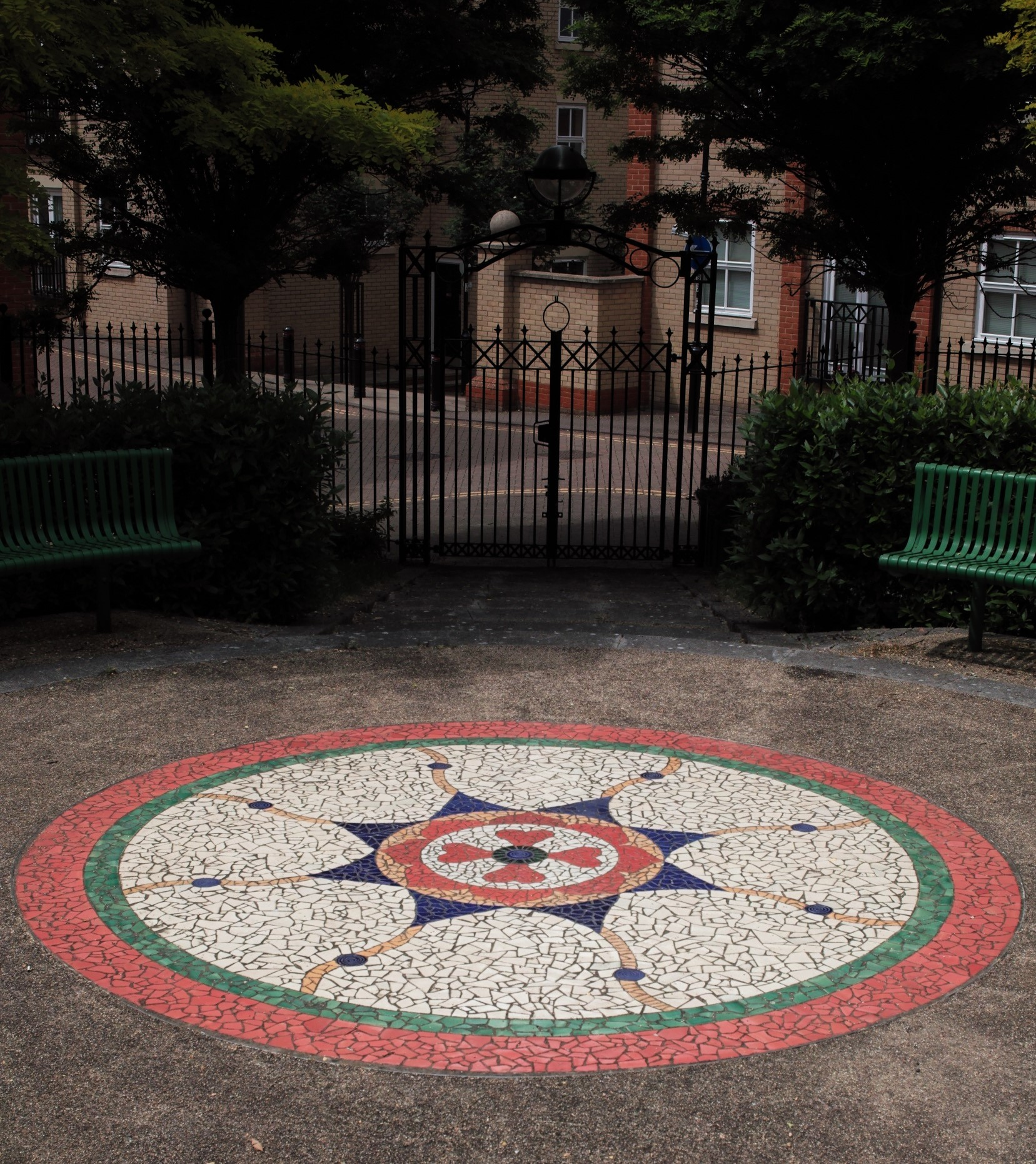
'Balkerne Star' designed by Anne Schwegmann-Fielding, Balkerne Heights, Colchester – made in 2006 and inspired by a Roman mosaic flooring found in Colchester

Opened in 1972, the Mercury Theatre is a repertory theatre. Located nearby is Colchester Arts Centre, a multi-function arts venue located in the former St Mary-at-the-Walls church, and home of the Colchester Beer Festival. The Headgate Theatre is also located in Colchester. There are several bars with live music.

Firstsite is a contemporary art organisation, based in the Visual Arts Facility, which was designed by Rafael Viñoly, and opened in September 2011, at a total cost of approximately £25.5 million, £9 million more than the original estimate.

The Minories houses The Minories Galleries, which is managed by Colchester Institute and presents contemporary exhibitions by artists from the region. The building is owned by the Victor Batte-Lay Foundation.

The Colchester Art Society was founded in 1946 and hosts regular exhibitions in the city, including at the Minories Galleries, Cuckoo Farm Studios, as well as lectures at Firstsite.

In 2009, an art collective called 'Slack Space' took up some of the closed-down shops in the centre and converted them into art galleries with the hope of promoting art and design. The Colchester School of Art, opened in 1885, is based in the Colchester Institute, near the centre.

The annual Colchester Fringe has taken place in October since 2021. The two-week event sees comedy, theatre, music and other performing arts take place at venues across the city including the Mercury Theatre, Headgate Theatre and Colchester Arts Centre.

A film festival, showcasing a selection of new feature and short films from around the world and centred at the VAF, was held from to 2012 to 2017 (excluding 2016). There are 21 cinema screens spread across the 8 screen Odeon, 3 screen Curzon, one screen in the Firstsite gallery and a 9-screen Vue cinema opened at the Northern Gateway in 2026.

=== Sport ===
Local links with football began with the amateur club Colchester Town, which was formed in 1867 and dissolved in 1937. They were succeeded by professional club Colchester United, who compete in Football League Two (as of season 2025–26) and play home games at Colchester Community Stadium. Founded in 1937, the club entered the Football League in 1950, originally playing home games at their former Layer Road stadium until 2008. The club reached its highest league finish of 10th place in the Championship in 2006–07, and were one of the few teams to win the Watney Cup, in 1971.

Other sports teams based in the area include Colchester United Women Football Club, Colchester School of Gymnastics, Colchester Rugby Football Club, Colchester Swimming Club, Colchester Gladiators American Football Club, Colchester and District Archery Club, Colchester Weight Lifting Club, Colchester Powerlifting Club (ColPower) and Colchester & East Essex Cricket Club. Essex County Cricket Club play some of their home games at Castle Park Cricket Ground, home of Colchester & East Essex.

Sports facilities in Colchester include Colchester Leisure World, West End Sports Ground, Colchester Garrison Athletics Stadium (a co-operative facility used by both the army and civilian population), a skatepark and multiple tennis clubs and golf courses.

The £29 million, 76 acre Colchester Sports Park opened in 2021 at the Northern Gateway, and includes new facilities for Colchester RFC and the archery club alongside outdoor sports pitches, an indoor sports hall and gym, and a one-mile floodlit cycle track.

=== Media ===
Local news and television programmes are provided by BBC East and ITV Anglia from the Sudbury TV transmitter. The city's local radio stations are BBC Essex on 103.5 FM, Heart East on 96.1 FM, Greatest Hits Radio East on 100.2 FM, Colne Radio on 106.6 FM, and Actual Radio which broadcast online. The local newspapers are Colchester Gazette, Essex County Standard and East Anglian Daily Times.

=== Other ===
The commercial centre is home to upmarket department store Fenwick (still referred to by locals by its former name of Williams & Griffin (Willie Gees)), Primark, H&M, Boots and many local independent stores, restaurants, bars, cafés and leisure attractions.

Colchester Zoo, located to the south of the city, holds one of the largest zoological collections in the UK, with over 150 species and 1000 individual animals. The zoo attracts 1.5 million visitors annually.

== Landmarks ==
=== Colchester War Memorial ===
Colchester suffered in the First World War, losing some 1,248 in the conflict. As early as 1918 prominent voices were calling for a war memorial, with Councillor Edgar A. Hunt making the first formal proposition in an open letter to the press published on Christmas Day of that year. Shortly after the publication of the letter, a committee was set up to decide the form of the monument, with several practical schemes favoured by the working class. The committee formed to choose a proposal decided on a sculptural monument on 16 May 1919 with a vote of 7 to 9. Following a visit to the Royal Academy's War Memorial Exhibition, the sculptor Henry Charles Fehr was chosen to undertake the work, for which he was paid £3,000. The memorial consists of three human figures on a sculptural pedestal. The figures are of Saint George, an allegorical representation of peace and the goddess Nike.

=== Roman walls ===
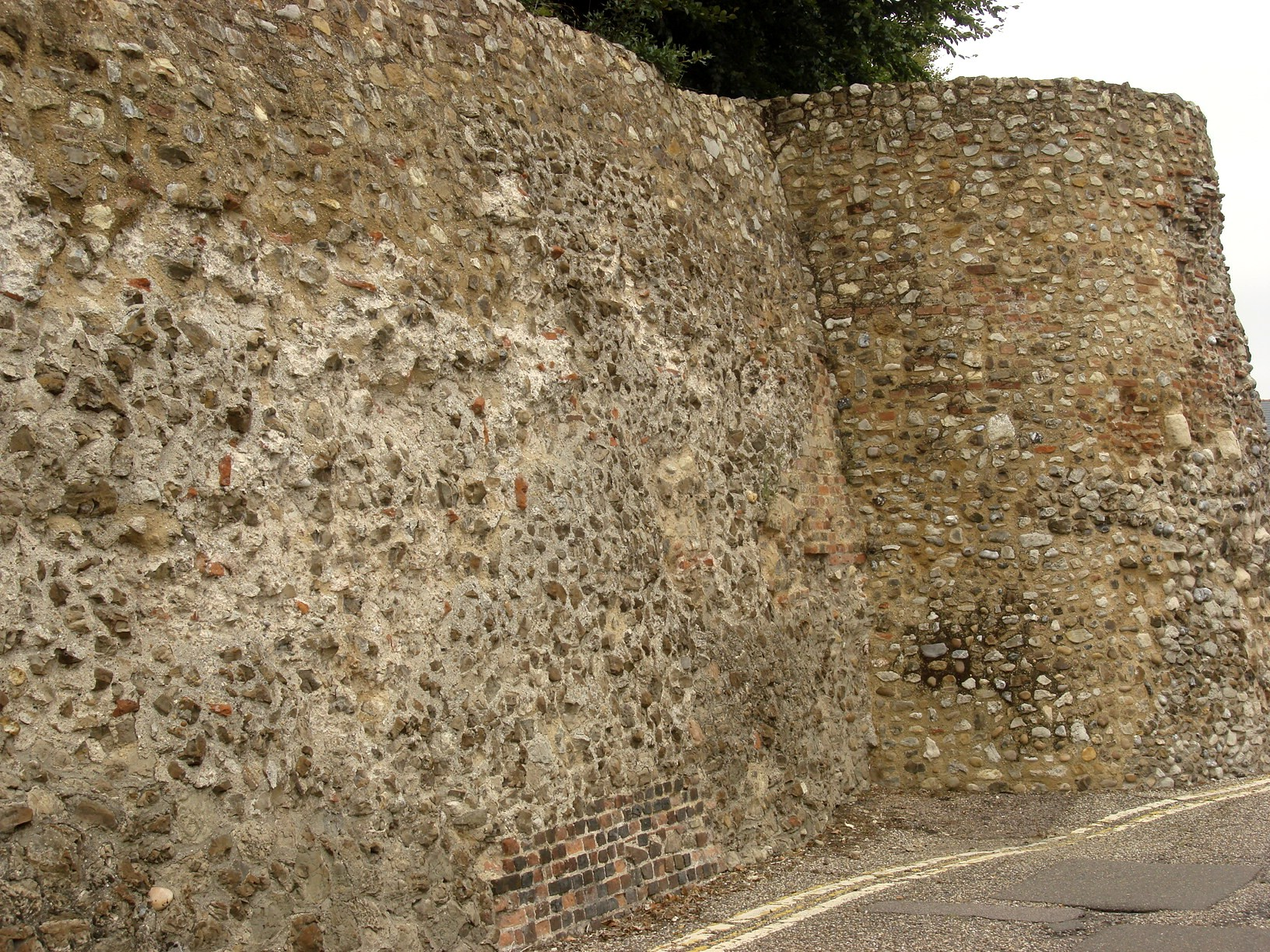
A surviving stretch of the Roman Town Wall in East Hill

Construction of the walls of Colchester took place between 65 and 80 AD, shortly after the destruction of the undefended colonia by Boudicca, and they continued in use until after the Siege of Colchester in 1648. Two large stretches of the wall are still standing on the west and north sides and a number of fragments are visible along the rest of the circuit. A notable survival is the Balkerne Gate, which is the earliest and most complete Roman gateway in the United Kingdom. A circular walk of nearly 2 miles (3 kilometres) follows the course of the wall and the surviving portions.

=== "Jumbo" water tower ===
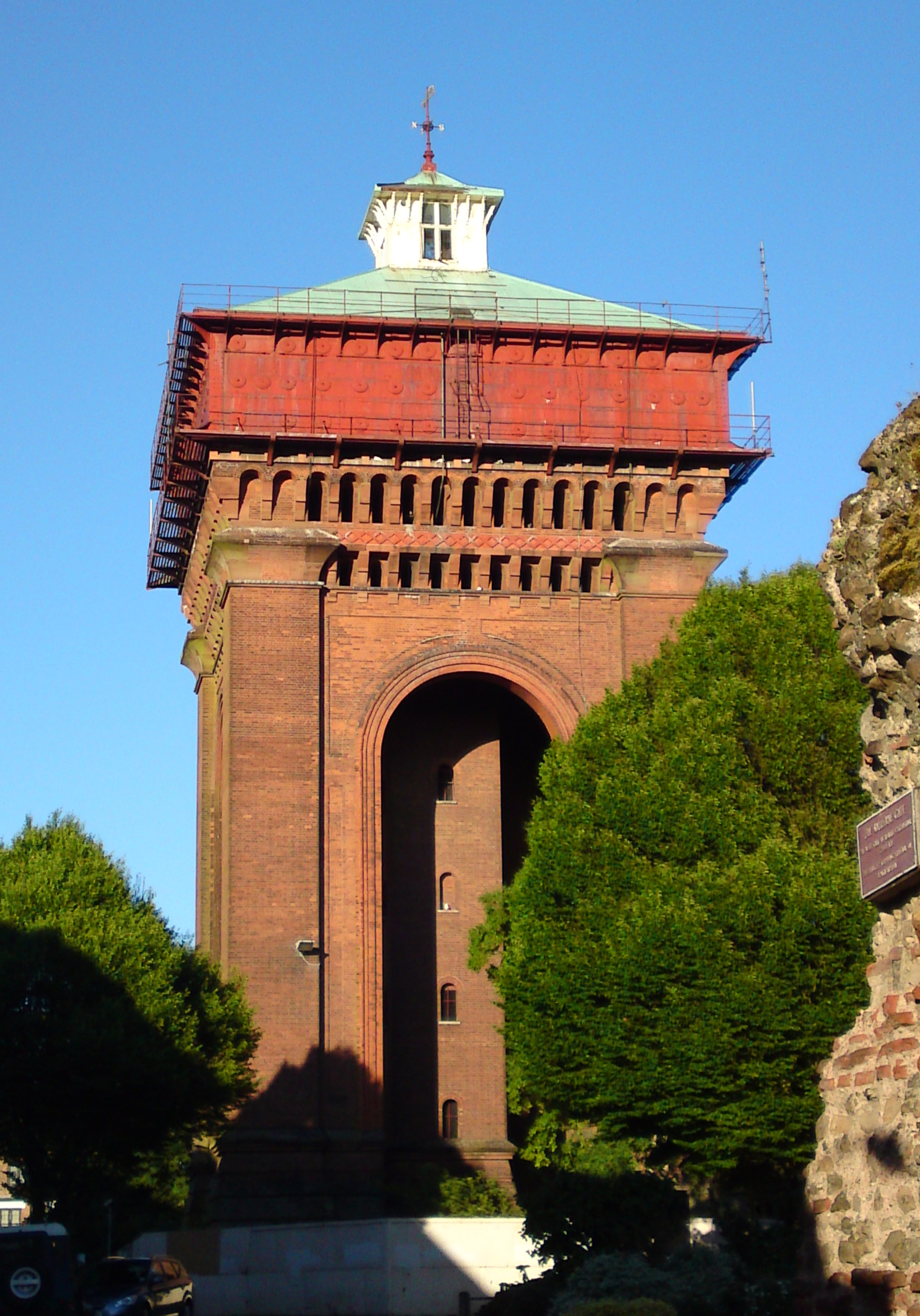
The Balkerne Water Tower or "Jumbo", viewed from the Balkerne Gate

Completed in 1883 when the Town Council took over Colchester's water supply, the 110-foot (34-metre) water tower was originally called the "Balkerne Water Tower", but soon became known as "Jumbo" because of its large size, which prompted the addition of an elephant-shaped weather vane at its peak. The tower was decommissioned in 1987 and has had several private owners pending redevelopment.

=== Colchester Town Hall ===
The town hall is built on the site of the original moot hall, first recorded in 1277 and demolished in 1843. Replacing a Victorian town hall which had become unstable, work on the present building started in 1897 to the design of John Belcher in the Edwardian Baroque style, and was opened in 1902 by former prime minister, the Earl of Rosebery. The building dominates the High Street and the 192-foot (58.5-metre) Victoria Tower is widely visible. The tower was intended to commemorate the Diamond Jubilee of Queen Victoria and was funded by a donation from James Noah Paxman, the founder of Davey, Paxman & Co. It features four allegorical figures by L J Watts representing engineering, military defence, agriculture and fishery. At the top of the tower is a large bronze figure representing Saint Helena (the patron saint of Colchester) holding the True Cross; a local story says that a councillor was dispatched to Italy to find a statue of the saint, but could only find one of the Virgin Mary, which then had to be modified locally.

== Education ==
=== Secondary education ===
As is the case for the rest of Essex, Colchester's state schooling operates a two-tier system. Two of the local secondary schools are selective, Colchester Royal Grammar School and Colchester County High School for Girls, the remainder being comprehensives. Comprehensive secondary schools include The Gilberd School, Colchester Academy, Philip Morant School and College, St Helena School, St Benedict's Catholic College, Thomas Lord Audley School, Paxman Academy and Trinity School.

=== Private schools ===
Private schools in Colchester include St. Mary's School and Colchester High School.

=== Tertiary ===
The University of Essex is located to the east of Colchester in Wivenhoe Park, in the civil parish of Wivenhoe. Other tertiary institutions include Colchester Sixth Form College and Colchester Institute. Colchester also has an ACL.

== Transport ==
=== Buses ===
Colchester's bus services are operated primarily by First Essex and Arriva Colchester, as well as by Hedingham & Chambers, Beeston's, Ipswich Buses, Stephensons of Essex and Panther Travel (Essex). The bus station is located in Osborne Street, on the southern edge of the centre.

The Colchester Rapid Transit System is a bus rapid transport line which, as of October 2025, is overdue for completion from its late 2024 schedule, and is now not envisaged to open until there is occupied housing at the Tendring Colchester Border Community. The project will be the first such system in Essex and will be operated by First Essex.

=== Railway ===
Colchester Town and Hythe stations are on the Sunshine Coast Line operated by Greater Anglia, and linked to the rest of the network via the Great Eastern Main Line at Colchester North station, which lies just outside this area.

=== Roads ===
Colchester is linked to London and East Anglia by the A12, which bypasses the town to the north and east; it is the region's main trunk route. The A120 connects Colchester with Harwich in the east, and with Stansted Airport and the M11 motorway in the west.

=== Port ===
Colchester was historically a port, with a regular weekly shipping service to London by 1637; about 3,000 vessels per year using the port in 1892. The former quay of The Hythe is no longer in use, partly because the river has silted up, although Colchester is still a registered port (code GBCOL).

== References in literature ==
The Roman historian Tacitus mentions Colchester (Camulodunum) in The Annals of Imperial Rome. In Book XIV he describes how '...the Roman ex-soldiers...had recently established a settlement at Camulodunum', later burned down in the Iceni rebellion.

John Morris suggested that the name Camelot of Arthurian legend was probably a reference to Camulodunum, the capital of Britannia in Roman times.

It is the only town in Britain to have been explicitly mentioned in George Orwell's 1949 novel Nineteen Eighty-Four as being the target of a nuclear attack during the (fictional) Atomic Wars of the 1950s.

== In popular culture ==
Colchester is reputed to be the home of three of the best known English nursery rhymes: 'Old King Cole', 'Humpty Dumpty' and 'Twinkle, Twinkle Little Star', although in the cases of the former two, the legitimacy is disputed.

Local legend places Colchester as the seat of King Cole (or Coel) of the rhyme Old King Cole, a legendary ancient king of Britain. The name Colchester is from Latin: the place-name suffixes chester, cester, and caster derive from the Latin word castrum (fortified place). In the legend Helena, the daughter of Cole, married the Roman senator Constantius Chlorus, who had been sent by Rome as an ambassador and was named as Cole's successor. Helena's son became Emperor Constantine I. Helena was canonised as Saint Helena of Constantinople and is credited with finding the True Cross and the remains of the Magi. She is now the patron saint of Colchester. This is recognised in the emblem of Colchester: a cross and three crowns. The Mayor's medallion contains a Byzantine style icon of Saint Helena. A local secondary school – St Helena's – is named after her.

A popular local myth credits Colchester as the source of the rhyme Humpty Dumpty, and for a time this was promoted by the local tourist board; there is, however, no evidence for this.

The third rhyme said to have come from Colchester is Twinkle Twinkle Little Star, which was written by Jane Taylor who lived in the Dutch Quarter, and published in 1806 with the title "The Star". In 2024, a statue sculpted by Mandy Pratt that shows Taylor and her sister Ann was unveiled in Colchester High Street, following a campaign by Sir Bob Russell.

Colchester has also been suggested as one of the potential sites of Camelot, on account of having been the capital of Roman Britain and its ancient name of Camulodunum: this is not considered likely by academics, as in Arthurian times Colchester was under Saxon control.

The first part of Daniel Defoe's 1722 novel Moll Flanders was set in Colchester.

Colchester was also a named line of lathe machinery.

In the 1949 book Nineteen Eighty-Four, Colchester was the scene of a nuclear detonation.

The Doctor Who episodes The Lodger and Closing Time are set in Colchester, although they were filmed in Cardiff.

In the 1966 Asterix comic book Asterix in Britain the Camulodunum rugby team wins a game against Durovernum (Roman name for Canterbury). The kit worn during the match in the book is similar to that of Colchester United.

Colchester appears in the 2020 video game Assassin's Creed Valhalla, recreated as it was in the early medieval period.

== Colcestrians ==
People of note that have lived in Colchester include:

- Cunobelin (died before 43 AD), King of the Britons
- Eudo Dapifer (died 1120), oversaw the building of Colchester Castle and was its first steward.
- John Ball (died 1381), leader of the Peasants' Revolt of 1381
- Thomas Audley (1488–1544), Lord Chancellor of England 1533–44, founder of Magdalene College, Cambridge
- Mary Matthew (1516–1602), heraldry recipient
- John Beche (died 1539), last abbot of St John's Abbey, Colchester
- William Gilbert (1544–1603), scientist, pioneer in the field of magnetism and court physician to Elizabeth I and James I
- Samuel Harsnett (1561–1631), writer and Archbishop of York
- Rose Thurgood (born 1602), religious writer, Nonconformist Protestant
- Charles Lucas (1613–1648), royalist soldier in the English Civil War and Siege of Colchester
- Margaret Cavendish (1623–1673), poet, philosopher and early writer of science fiction
- Philip Morant (1700–1770), parish priest of St Mary-at-the-Walls, author of The History & Antiquities of the County of Essex
- Joseph Thurston (born 1704), poet
- Susan Smythies (born 1720), story writer
- John Lawrence (1753-1839), writer; animal welfare and rights advocate
- Charles Abbot (1757–1829), speaker of the House of Common and first Baron Colchester
- Ann Taylor (born 1782), poet
- Jane Taylor (1783–1824), poet and author of the lyrics to Twinkle, Twinkle, Little Star
- William Hale (1797–1870), early rocket engineer
- George Biddell Airy (1801–1892), Astronomer Royal, attended Colchester Royal Grammar School 1814–1819
- William Gull (1816–1890), physician-in-ordinary to Queen Victoria, and governor of Guy's Hospital
- Charles Spurgeon (1834–1892), Particular Baptist preacher, known as the "Prince of Preachers"
- Thomas Miller Beach, aka Henri Le Caron (1841–1894), spy, who did much to thwart the objectives of the Fenians
- Laming Worthington-Evans (1868–1931), Secretary of State for War, and Postmaster General
- Archibald Wavell (1883–1950), senior army officer and the penultimate Viceroy of India
- Bernard Mason (1895–1981), businessman, philanthropist and clock collector
- Gerald Templer (1898–1979), army officer
- H. A. Morton Whitby (1898–1969), urologist, cancer researcher, surgeon
- Edgell Rickword (1898–1982), poet, critic
- Alfred Lungley (1905–1989), awarded the George Cross after the Quetta earthquake of 1935
- Hermann Arthur Jahn (1907–1979), scientist, discovered the Jahn-Teller effect.
- Mary Whitehouse (1910–2001), Christian morality campaigner
- Cuthbert Alport (1912–1998), cabinet Mminister, High Commissioner to the Federation of Rhodesia and Nyasaland, and High Steward of Colchester
- Elizabeth Inglis (1913-2007), actress and mother to actress Sigourney Weaver
- Ken Aston (1915–2001), football referee, responsible for many important developments in football refereeing
- Margaret Thatcher (1925–2013), Prime Minister
- Klaus Kinski (1926–1991), actor and director, former German POW in Colchester during the World War II
- Roger Penrose (born 1931), mathematical physicist and philosopher
- Bob Russell (born 1946), MP for Colchester, High Steward of Colchester
- John Cooper Clarke (born 1949), performance poet
- Carol Leader (b. 1950), former actress and Play School (British TV series) presenter for the BBC.
- Helen Mary Jones (born 1960), member of the Welsh Senedd (1993 to 2011 and 2018–2021)
- Neil Foster (born 1962), cricketer
- Tony Gardner (born 1964), actor
- Dave Rowntree (born 1964), musician, drummer for Blur
- Graham Coxon (born 1969), musician and Blur lead guitarist
- Sue Son (born 1985), violinist
- Mark Felton (born 1974), author, historian, and YouTuber.
- Stella Creasy (born 1977), MP for Walthamstow.
- Will Quince (born 1982), MP for Colchester
- Elizabeth Williams (born 1993), WNBA player

== Twin towns ==
Colchester's twin towns and sister cities are:

- Wetzlar, Germany, since 1969
- Avignon, France, since 1972
- Imola, Italy, since 1997
- Yangzhou, China, since 2015

== Climate ==
Colchester is in one of the driest regions of the United Kingdom with average annual precipitation at 635 mm (25.0 inches), although among the wetter places in Essex. Colchester is generally regarded as having an oceanic climate (Köppen climate classification Cfb) like the rest of the United Kingdom. Its easterly position within the British Isles makes Colchester less prone to Atlantic depressions and weather fronts but more prone to droughts. This is because, like most areas in the south-east of England, Colchester's weather is influenced more by continental weather patterns than by Atlantic weather systems. This leads to a dry climate compared to the rest of the UK all year round and occasional (relative) extremes of temperatures during the year (occasional high 20 °Cs/low 30 °Cs during the summer) and quite a few nights below freezing during the winter months (daytime high temperatures are seldom below freezing). Any rainfall that does come from Atlantic weather systems is usually light, but a few heavy showers and thunderstorms can take place during the summer. Snow falls on average 13 days a year during winter and early spring.

The highest temperature recorded in Colchester was 39.0 °C (102 °F) in July 2022 (during the 2022 European heatwaves), and the lowest was −9.4 °C (15 °F) in December 2010.

Climate data for Colchester
Month	Jan	Feb	Mar	Apr	May	Jun	Jul	Aug	Sep	Oct	Nov	Dec	Year
Mean daily maximum °C (°F)	7 (45)	7.7 (45.9)	10.9 (51.6)	14.2 (57.6)	18 (64)	20.6 (69.1)	23.4 (74.1)	23.3 (73.9)	19.9 (67.8)	15 (59)	10.3 (50.5)	7.4 (45.3)	14.8 (58.7)
Daily mean °C (°F)	4.5 (40.1)	4.7 (40.5)	7.1 (44.8)	10.9 (51.6)	12.8 (55.0)	15.6 (60.1)	18.3 (64.9)	18.1 (64.6)	15.4 (59.7)	11.5 (52.7)	7.5 (45.5)	5 (41)	11.0 (51.7)
Mean daily minimum °C (°F)	2 (36)	1.7 (35.1)	3.3 (37.9)	4.7 (40.5)	7.7 (45.9)	10.7 (51.3)	13.2 (55.8)	13 (55)	10.9 (51.6)	8.1 (46.6)	4.8 (40.6)	2.7 (36.9)	6.9 (44.4)
Average precipitation mm (inches)	53 (2.1)	44 (1.7)	44 (1.7)	44 (1.7)	52 (2.0)	54 (2.1)	48 (1.9)	57 (2.2)	52 (2.0)	70 (2.8)	62 (2.4)	57 (2.2)	637 (24.8)
Source: 1981–2010 estimated average (records began in 1988) for COL station Colchester NE 2

== See also ==
- Coat of arms of Colchester
- Baron Colchester
- Geography of the United Kingdom#Geology
- List of natural disasters in the United Kingdom and preceding states
- Military history of the United Kingdom during World War II
- Colchester churches
- Colchester power station
