= Colchester Rapid Transit =

Rapid Transit System in Essex, England

Overview
- Owner: Colchester City Council, Essex County Council
- Locale: Colchester, Essex, England
- Transit type: Bus rapid transit
- Number of lines: 1
- Number of stations: 8

Operation
- Operation will start: 2026 or 2027
- Operator: TBC

Technical
- System length: 4.7 mi (8 km)

Colchester Rapid Transit, is a bus rapid transit system under construction in Colchester, Essex, England; it has a main bus line including a 1 mile segregated busway alongside the Northern Approach Road, and new bus lanes and priority measures at Clingoe Hill. It was set to open its first line in late 2024, but as of October 2025, although some bus lanes have been made available for other bus services, the rapid transit system is not envisaged to open until there is occupied housing at the Tendring Colchester Border Community.

The system will serve central Colchester, Essex University, as well as some suburbs including Myland and The Hythe.

== Overview ==
The system is being built as a part of multiple transport improvements across the city, such as the A133-A120 link road and the re-construction of St Botolph's Circus. The busway was proposed as a more efficient alternative after some called for a tram system in the city.

It is to have one line and eight stations, terminating in the proposed new garden community. The segregated busway portion is along the Northern Approach Road, transitioning to pre-existing bus lanes along Via Urbis Romanae at the junction with Mill Road.

The line will have one bus every ten minutes, which would make it one of the most frequent bus services in Essex.

== Construction ==
The first phase of the project, consisting of a segregated busway alongside the Northern Approach Road, was originally meant to be completed by Spring 2024, but was later delayed to Autumn 2025. Work on the first phase was completed in October 2025.

The project received criticism after it was revealed that cracks appeared on multiple homes after construction started to build the rapid busway.

The first phase alongside the Northern Approach Road was built by Sisk Group.

Phase 2 consists of an eastbound bus lane on Clingoe Hill, alongside new widened cycle lanes and alterations to the junction at the Greenstead Road roundabout.

Phase 2 is expected to open in Spring 2026.

== See also ==
- Rapid Bus Transit
- Tramways in Colchester
