= Coat of arms of Colchester =

- Armiger: Colchester City Council
- Crest: On a Wreath of the Colours issuant from a Chaplet of Roses alternately Gules and Argent a Female Figure habited Azure and Veiled Argent crowned Or holding a Passion Cross Or
- Shield: Gules four Pieces of Wood raguly conjoined in a cross proper each side arm transfixed with a Nail palewise Sable ensigned by an Ancient Crown Or and that in base enfiling a like Crown and transfixed by a like Nail in bend
- Supporters: To the dexter a Roman Centurion habited and holding in his dexter hand a Short Sword proper and to the sinister an Oyster Fisherman habited and holding in his sinister hand a Length of Rope proper each standing on a Compartment comprising a Grassy Mound proper and an Estuary barry wavy Argent and Azure
- Motto: 'No cross, no crown'

The coat of arms of Colchester was first granted to the city by Henry V in 1413.

The shield is more commonly used than the full arms. There are two versions of the arms that are commonly seen. The first was in use from c. 1550 to 1915, and the other from 1415 to c. 1550 and from 1915 to the present.

== Historic arms ==
=== The "raven" of Colchester ===
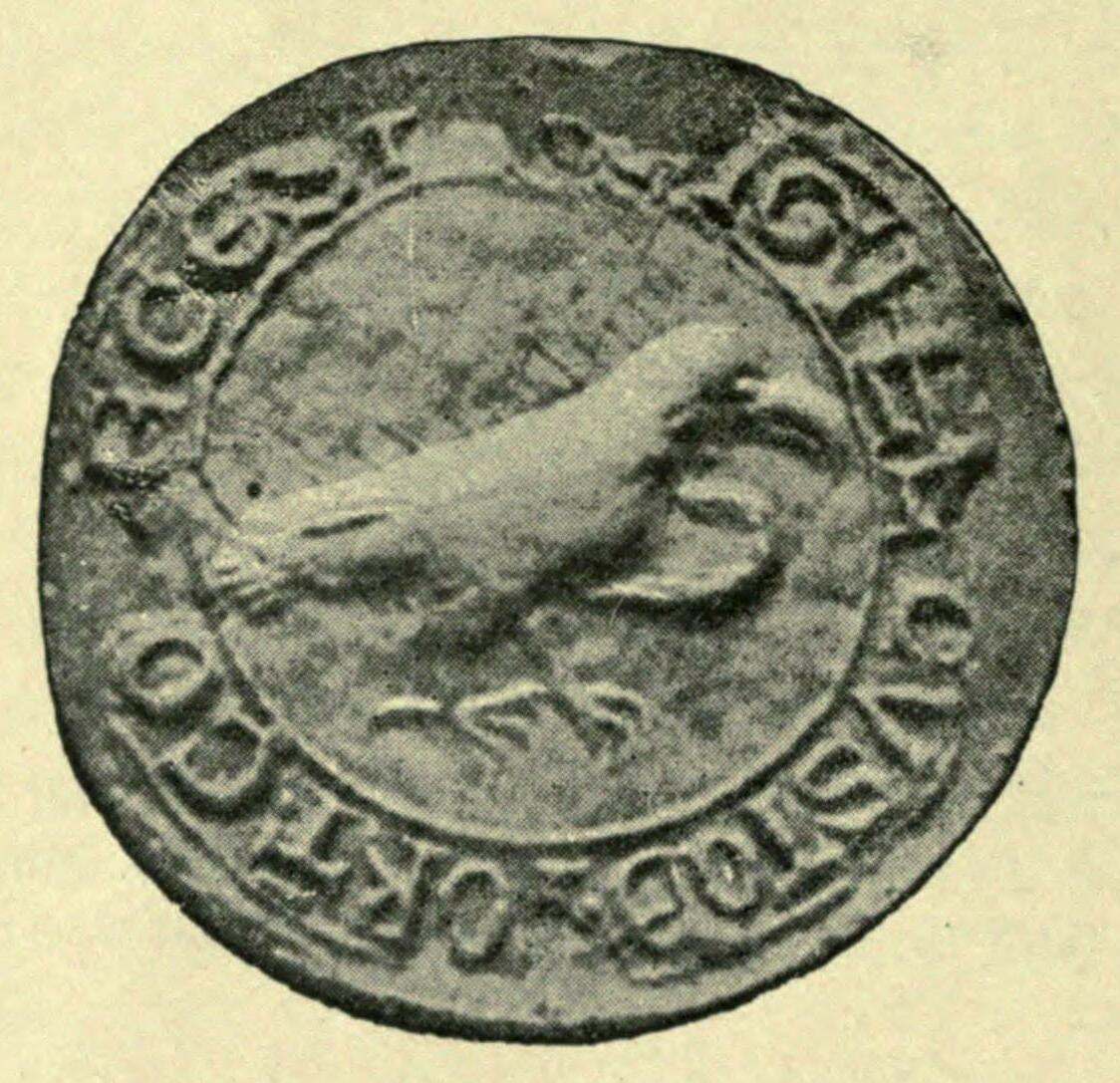
Raven seal appended to a deed of the year 1341

The oldest known device associated with Colchester is the raven, found on seals dating back to the 11th or 12th century. It continued to be used for many centuries as a symbol of the Port of Colchester. It has been suggested that the raven may have been derived from a symbol of the Danes when they ruled the area.

=== Post-Reformation arms (c. 1550—1915) ===
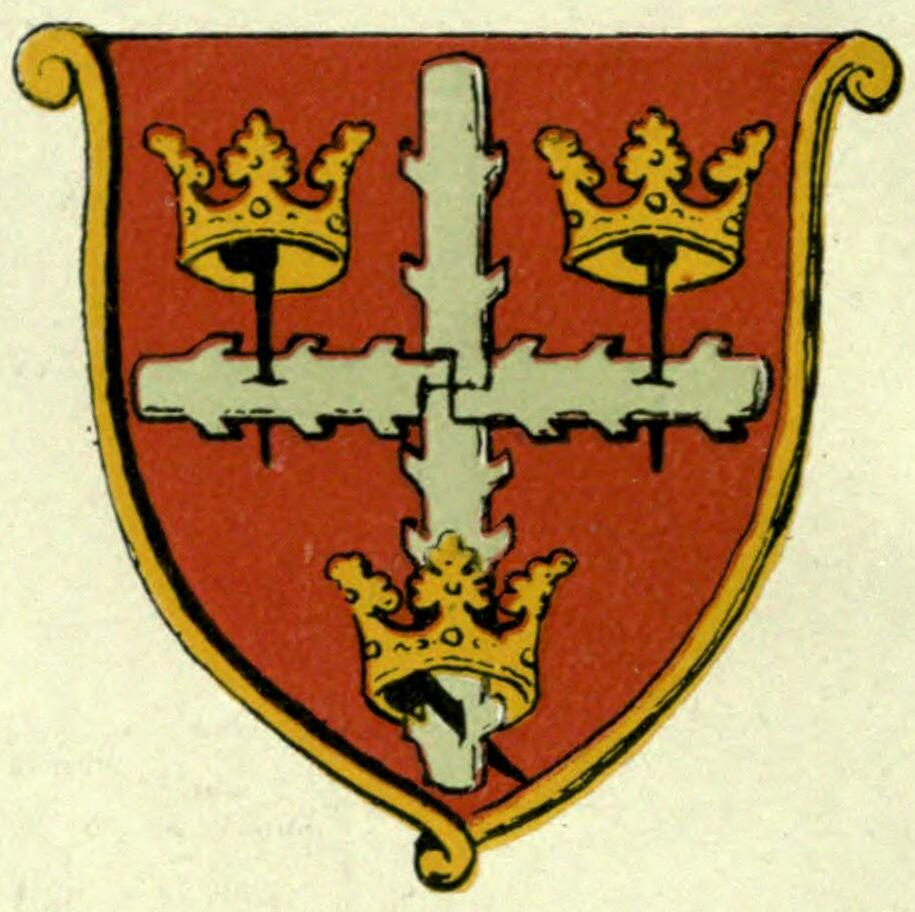
Ancient form of the arms, as emblazoned on the Borough Charter, 1413

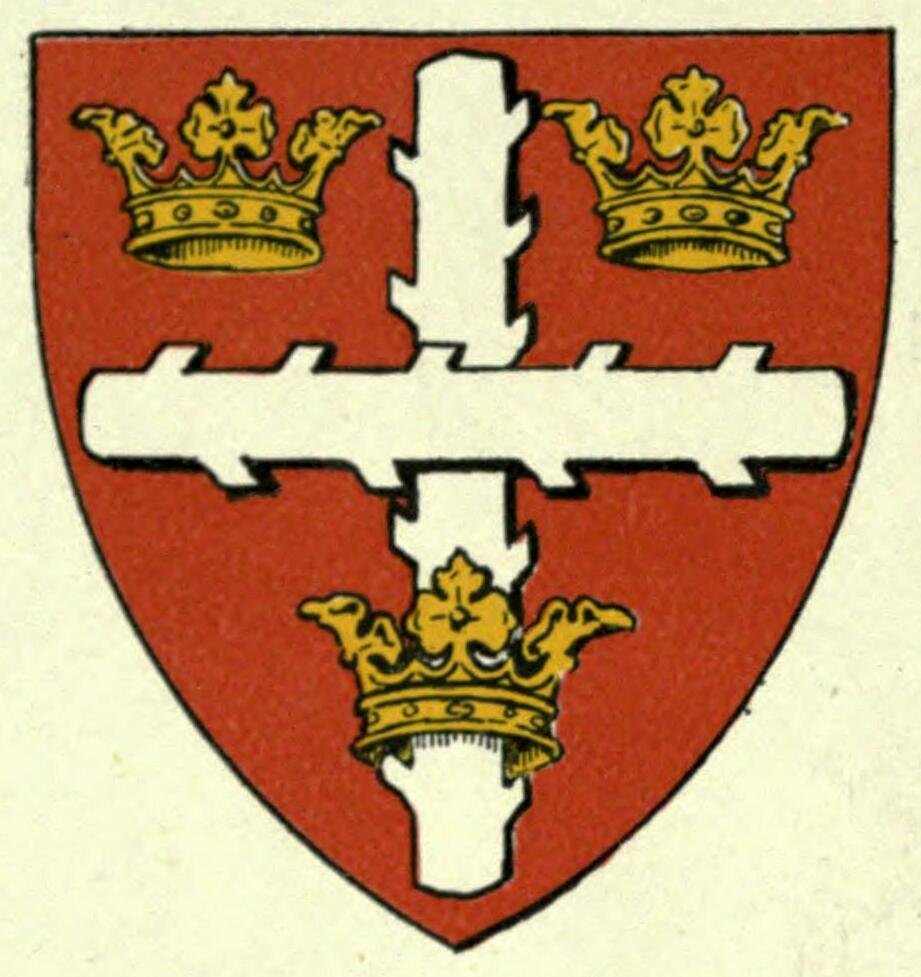
Arms of the borough as recorded at the College of Arms, 1558

This shield, which can be blazoned as Gules, two staves raguly and couped argent, one in pale, surmounted by another in fess between two ducal coronets in chief Or the bottom part of the shaft enfiled with a ducal coronet of the last or alternatively Gules two silver ragged staves joined in the form of a cross, its arms and foot pierced by Passion Nails; and three golden crowns, the bottom encircling the foot of the cross was in use until 1915. It had been in use since at least 1558, where it was mentioned in the heralds' visitation of that year. It is thought to have been created by heralds wishing to remove the reference to a revered relic during the Reformation.

It was in 1915 that the Corporation of Colchester revised the arms of Colchester based on a report by Alderman Guerney Benham. It decided to revert the arms to the original form that were granted to Colchester by Henry V in 1413, as described on Letters Patent "and also employed upon the Common Seal of the Borough, adopted at about the same date and used continuously as the borough seal for over four centuries" The change was supported by the 'advice of many eminent heralds'. Among the changes was the firm addition of the nails and the change of the wood from argent (white) to vert (green).

== Current arms (1415 - c. 1550, 1915 - present) ==
The current arms, which are officially assigned to Colchester Borough Council by the College of Arms, were first used after being granted by King Henry V in 1413, when the town was granted a new charter. These early arms featured inscriptions like QUAM CRUX INSIGNIT HELENAM COLCHESTERIA GIGNET and COLCESTRIENSIS SUM BURGI COMMUNE SIGILLUM. The shield shows a cross, with three crowns, one of each 'arm' and one encircling the foot of the cross, each supported by a nail. There was, and is, also question over whether there should be three nails or four. The shield can be blazoned Gules four Pieces of Wood raguly conjoined in a cross proper each side arm transfixed with a Nail palewise Sable ensigned by an Ancient Crown Or and that in base enfiling a like Crown and transfixed by a like Nail in bend.

In 1976, the coat of arms was extended with the addition of a crest, a torse of red and white, topped with roses of the same colours rising from which is a female figure, holding a Cross, which can be blazoned On a Wreath of the Colours issuant from a Chaplet of Roses alternately Gules and Argent a Female Figure habited Azure and Veiled Argent crowned Or holding a Passion Cross Or.; supporters of a fisherman in the sinister (observer's right) and a Roman soldier in the dexter (observer's left). The motto No Cross, No Crown was added. These additions are not generally used. As of 1989, these arms had never been used. Until this standardisation, the official description included detail on the type of ragules on the wood and the direction of the wood.

The current arms are a direct reference to Saint Helena, the patron saint of Colchester, believed to have been born there. The charter is the inscription Sancta Elana nata fuit in Colcestria. Mater Constani fuit et Sanctam Crucem invenit Elana (St. Helen was born in Colchester. Helen was the mother of Constantine and she found the Holy Cross). The cross is believed to be the True Cross, which Saint Helena is supposed to have found. The red background represents the blood of Christ; the nail the Holy Nails. The crowns are representative of the crowns of the Magi, the bodies of whom Saint Helena is supposed to have found. The four shafts are joined in a fylfot, a symbol of good fortune.

When Colchester United was founded in 1937, it adopted this coat of arms as the club badge. This was changed in 1972 after a disagreement with the Council over use of the arms. Colchester Town also used these arms as their badge.

The Bishop of Colchester bears no arms.

Banner of Arms of the Borough of Colchester

The modern coat of arms of Colchester should not be confused with that of Nottingham, which, apart from being supported by two royal stags instead of a fisherman and Roman soldier, differs only in the absence of the nails on the cross. This arms is described as Gules issuant from the base a ragged Cross couped proper between two Ducal Coronets in chief Or the lower limb of the Cross enfiled with a like Coronet, but, as with Colchester, the cross is usually shown in green.
