= Colchester Town Hall =

Municipal building in Colchester, Essex, England

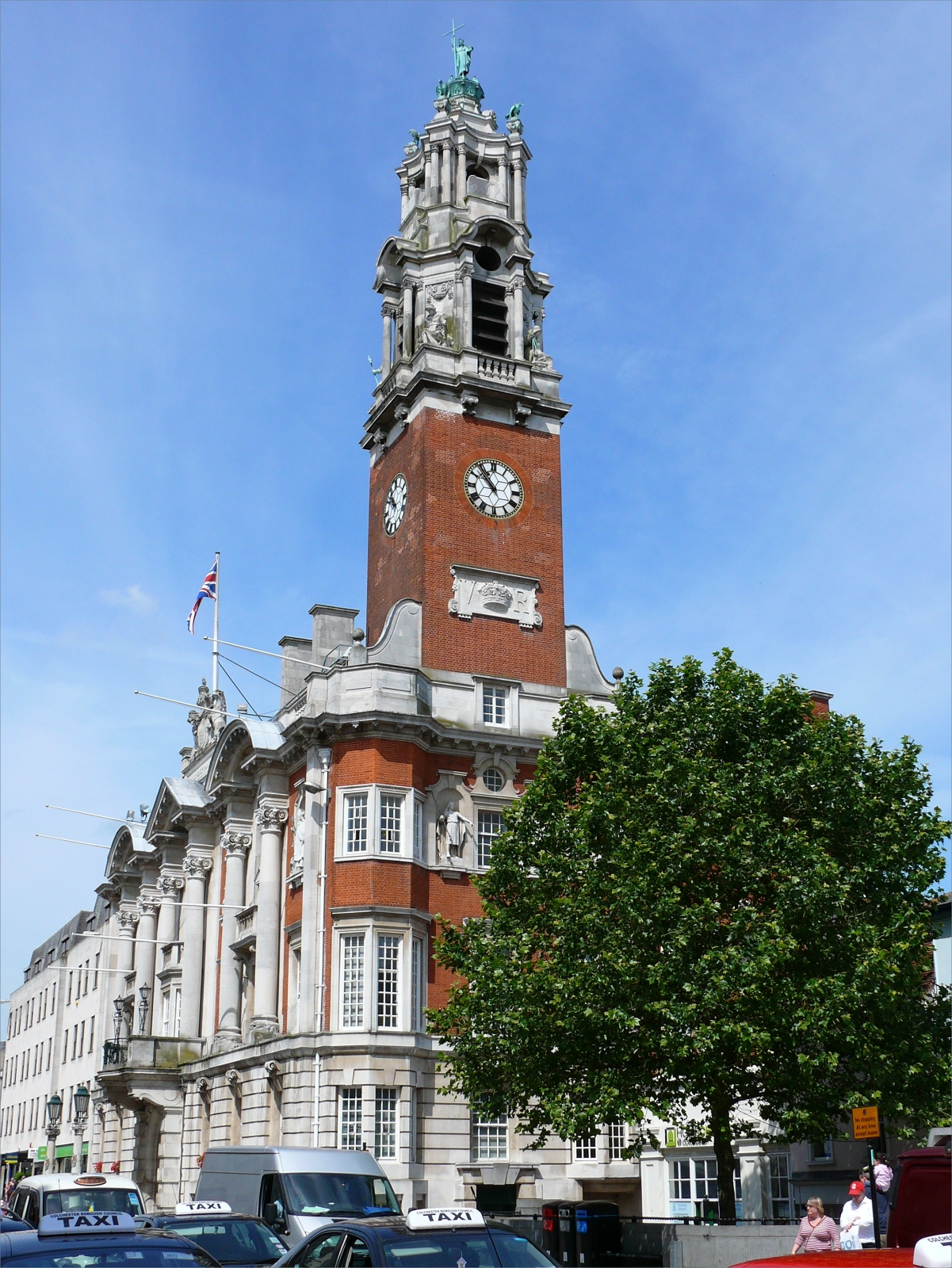
- Colchester Town Hall

- Shown in Essex
- 51.8899°N 0.8989°E
- Location: Colchester

History
- Built: 1902

Site notes
- Architect: John Belcher
- Architectural style: Edwardian Baroque style

Listed Building – Grade I
- Official name: Colchester Town Hall
- Designated: 25 March 1968
- Reference no.: 1337736

Colchester Town Hall is a municipal building in the High Street in Colchester, Essex, England. The town hall, which is the headquarters of Colchester City Council, is a Grade I listed building.

== History ==
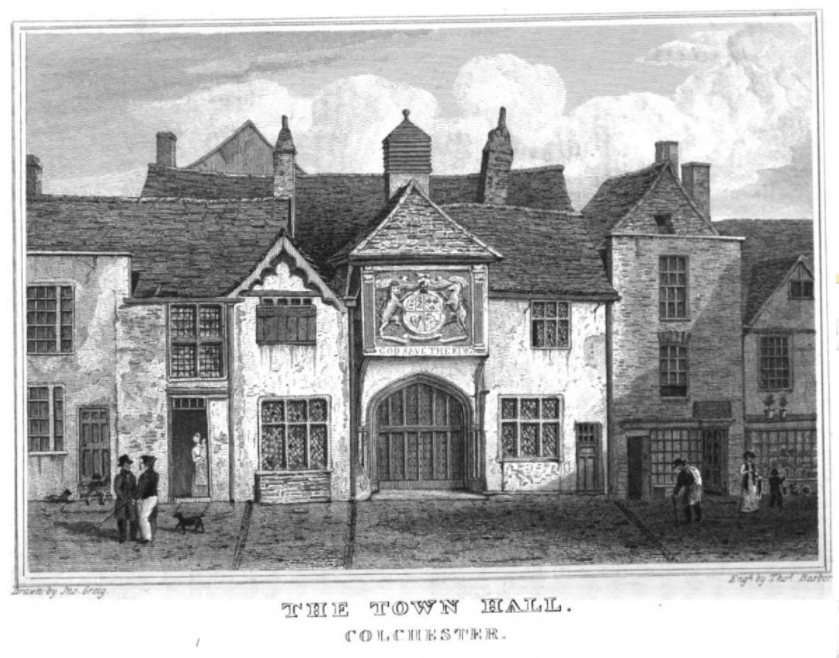
An 1826 depiction of the old Colchester Town Hall

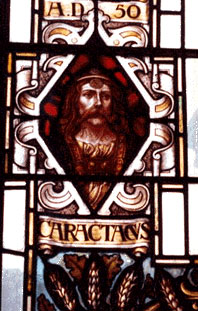
A stained glass window in the town hall depicting the 1st century leader of the local Catuvellauni tribe, Caratacus

The first building on the site, a moot hall, was completed in 1277, remodelled in 1374 and demolished in 1843. The second building on the site, which was designed by John Blore and John Raphael Rodrigues Brandon in the neoclassical style with six full-height Doric order pilasters, was completed in 1845. After it was found to be unstable civic leaders decided to procure a further building on the same site in the late 19th century.

Construction of the new building began in 1897. It was designed by John Belcher in the Edwardian Baroque style and was opened by the former Prime Minister, the Earl of Rosebery in 1902. The design involved a symmetrical main frontage with seven bays facing onto the High Street; the central section featured an arched doorway with the borough coat of arms in the tympanum and flanked by Doric order pilasters. There was an ornate balcony above the doorway and there were also three pairs of huge engaged Corinthian order columns spanning the first and second floors each carrying a broken pediment. Pevsner described the design as having been completed "with more braggadocio than anyone".

A 192 feet (59 m) tower, funded by a donation from James Noah Paxman, the founder of local engineers, Davey, Paxman & Co, was erected at the east end of the building to commemorate the Diamond Jubilee of Queen Victoria. It featured four allegorical figures by L. J. Watts representing engineering, military defence, agriculture and fishery. At the top of the tower the architect placed a large bronze figure representing Saint Helena (the patron saint of Colchester) holding the True Cross. Councillor Arthur Jarmin travelled as far as Italy to locate a suitable statue of the saint, but could only find one of the Virgin Mary, which then had to be modified locally. Just below this statue four bronze ravens by Francis Carruthers Gould could be found, representing the portreeve who ran Colchester's medieval port. A chiming clock with five bells was placed in the tower, with another 15th-century bell which is thought to have hung in the original moot hall. The clock is known locally as Charlie, after Charles Hawkins, who paid for it; it was manufactured by Smith & Sons of Derby. The bells, were by John Warner & Sons.

The main facade of the town hall featured six life-sized statues, also by Watts, depicting famous people connected with Colchester: on the south elevation, Eudo Dapifer, Lord Audley, William Gilbert and Samuel Harsnett, and on the east, Edward the Elder and Boudica. The interior featured a marble staircase with a statue of Queen Victoria and a monument to the Colchester Martyrs. The first floor was equipped a mayoral suite, a committee room and the council chamber with a painted ceiling and stained glass by Clayton and Bell. The second floor was fitted out with a large assembly hall called the Moot Hall. A fine pipe organ, designed and built by Norman and Beard with three manuals, was donated by the local member of parliament, Sir Weetman Pearson, and installed in the hall.

The building, which served as the headquarters of Colchester Borough Council, eventually became inadequate in the context of the expanding responsibilities of the borough council and additional accommodation was acquired to the west of the main site in 1965. Queen Elizabeth II visited the town hall and had lunch with civic leaders before waving to the crowds from the balcony on 20 May 1985. The building was subsequently connected by a tunnel under West Stockwell Street to new facilities at Angel Court, to the east of the main site, in 1988.

Works of art in the town hall include a painting depicting a spotted dog, with the Golden Horn in the background, by Otto Hoynck, a painting depicting merrymaking in a Flemish Village by David Vinckboons and a painting depicting Dutch Protestants fleeing from religious persecution by the Duke of Alba and seeking permission to live in Colchester in 1570 by the local artist, Harry Becker. There is also a portrait of the former Speaker of the House of Commons, Lord Colchester, by James Lonsdale as well as a portrait of the former local member of parliament, Charles Gray Round, by John Lucas.
