= St Mary's School, Colchester =

St Mary's School

Location
- 91 Lexden Road; Colchester, Essex, CO3 3RB; United Kingdom; 51°53′18″N 0°52′42″E

Information
- Type: Private day school
- Motto: Latin: Scientia et veritas (Knowledge and truth)
- Established: 1908
- Founder: May and Lillian Billson
- Local authority: Essex
- Headmistress: Nicola Griffiths
- Gender: Girls
- Age: 2 to 16
- Enrolment: 400~
- Houses: Abbeygate; Headgate; Balkerngate; Schergate
- Publication: St Mary’s Spotlight
- Website: http://www.stmaryscolchester.org.uk/

St Mary's School is a private day school for girls in Colchester, Essex, England. St Mary's is a member of the Girls' Schools Association and the Independent Association of Preparatory Schools.

== History ==
St Mary's School was opened in the summer of 1908 by sisters May and Lillian Billson at 15 Lexden Road, a house in St Mary's Terrace East, with eight girls, five of whom had moved from Walton's School in Inglis Road. May taught six nine-year-old girls while Lillian taught the other two girls in the dining room. Subjects were English, History, Geography, French, Arithmetic, Geometry and Latin. In 1914 they sat their first public examination, the Junior Cambridge Exam. By 1915 the school occupied 17 Lexden Road. In 1923, the school bought new premises on Lexden Road, 'Glen Mervyn'. May and Lillian retired at Christmas 1934 and Phyllis Comrie became the new Headmistress. There was a decline in the number of pupils during the Second World War, although this trend reversed after the war. Comrie retired in 1957.
