= John Sisk =

Irish builder and businessman (1837–1921)

John Sisk (20 September 1837 – 21 October 1921) was an Irish builder who founded the construction company of John Sisk & Son, eventually one of the largest construction enterprises in Ireland.

== Biography ==
=== Early life ===
John Sisk was born 1837 in Cork, Ireland. His childhood was a time of severe crisis for Ireland including the national disaster of the Great Famine during which, by death and emigration, the population declined by two million. He was orphaned when he was 11 years old, his parents dying in a widespread cholera epidemic. Sisk's parents were buried in St Joseph's Cemetery, where thousands of famine victims also lie (many in unmarked graves) and where he was himself buried, having died just before the establishment of the Irish Free State in October 1921.

After the death of his father, Sisk obtained an apprenticeship with a Quaker family of plasterers. He lived with this family, and John would later employ his former master, Richard Martin. Access to apprenticeships in trades was restricted in those days, and often one needed to be a blood relative to gain entry to a trade. John's father Patrick was a plasterer, and it was likely his grandfather, Nicholas, was also in the building trade, which could give a family history in the trade back to the mid-18th century.

=== Career ===
In 1859 John Sisk married Kate Burke, and in the same year, he also established his own business as an independent contractor. Most of his early work is not recorded (the earliest recorded building documentation is a receipt for completion of a school building in 1874), but his obituary 62 years later included among his achievements the construction of no fewer than 30 churches, a number of large schools, libraries and bank buildings. However, the records do not show, for example, that while building the spire of the Catholic Church and school building in Clonakilty in the mid-1880s, he also built Donovan's Hotel on the main street, which, like the Sisk business, remains today in the same family ownership. Many similar commercial contracts went unrecorded.

While always Cork-based, the firm ventured further afield in Munster, with periods of activity in north Tipperary, west Cork, north Kerry and Waterford. Thus while building the huge church at Nenagh, nearly 100 miles from Cork in 1896, John also took on a lesser contract of a small church in nearby Cloughjordan. To complete this job, John found and reopened a local stone quarry, recruited tradesmen from all over Munster and manufactured all the timber features on site, or in his own joinery shop in Cork. “One can only imagine the difficulty of getting to places in those days and a lot of tradespeople would move to towns,” says his great-grandson and chairman of Sisk Group today, George Sisk, who saw such a project first hand while he was still at school. “In Donamon Castle in Co Roscommon (Divine Word Missionaries Novitiate), the first project I was on, there was still a legacy of travelling tradesmen.”
