= Greenstead =

Ward in Colchester, England

Coordinates: 51.8906°N 0.9373°E

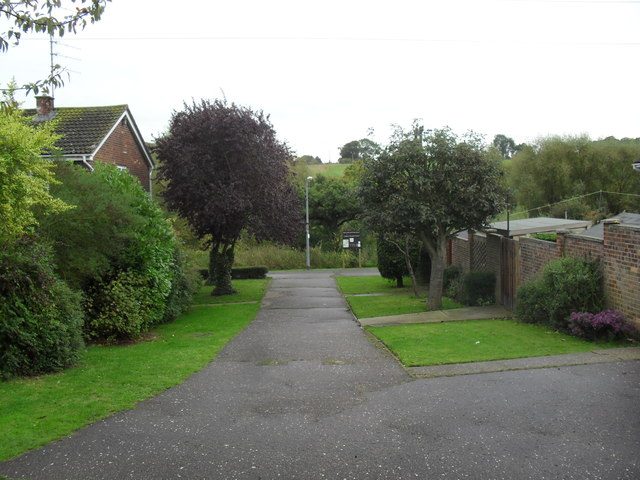

- Location within Essex
- Area: 2.989 km^{2} (1.154 sq mi)
- Population: 14,377 (2021 census)
  - Density: 4,810/km^{2} (12,500/sq mi)
- District: Colchester
- Shire county: Essex
- Region: East
- Country: England
- Sovereign state: United Kingdom
- Police: Essex
- Fire: Essex
- Ambulance: East of England

Greenstead is a large residential suburb and electoral ward in Colchester district of Essex, England. It is an eastern suburb of the built up area of Colchester. At the 2021 census, it had a population of 14,377.

== Geography ==
Greenstead rises from about 5 meters in the south-west of the ward, to about 40 meters, near the Greenstead Estate. It is within 30 minutes driving time of Ipswich, Clacton-on-Sea and Harwich.

The ward contains a council estate which when built was one of the largest in the country, as well as three churches. These are St Andrew's Church (Church of England), an Evangelical church, and a Catholic church. There are two primary schools: Hazelmere Junior School (on Hawthorn Avenue), and Unity Primary Academy (on Hickory Avenue). There is also Colchester Academy (formerly Sir Charles Lucas Arts College), a secondary school.

Within the Salary Brook nature reserve, lies Salary Brook, a tributary to the River Colne.

== History ==
The earliest record of the area appears in the Domesday Book of 1086, recorded as an area within the hundred of Colchester.

The parish of Greenstead was one of the 16 parishes which made up the ancient borough of Colchester, four of which (Berechurch, Lexden, Greenstead, and Myland or Mile End St Michael) were classed as "outlying parishes", covering areas that were more suburban to the main parts of the town it then was. All parishes were unified into a single parish of Colchester on 26 March 1897. At the 1891 census (the last before the abolition of the parish), Greenstead had a population of 868.

In 1974, the old borough and parish of Colchester were abolished when the much larger, modern Colchester borough (a city since 2022) was created. The community centre is located on Hawthorne Avenue.

== Crime ==
Greenstead has been previously named among some of the most deprived places within England, especially Magnolia within the ward, being within the most deprived 10 percent.

In addition, Greenstead's crime rate is estimated at 163 incidents per 1000, significantly higher than the rest of Colchester (96 per 1000). The most common offences include: Anti-social behaviour, Criminal damage and arson, and Vehicle-related crime and theft.
