= Sisk Group =

Irish construction and property enterprise

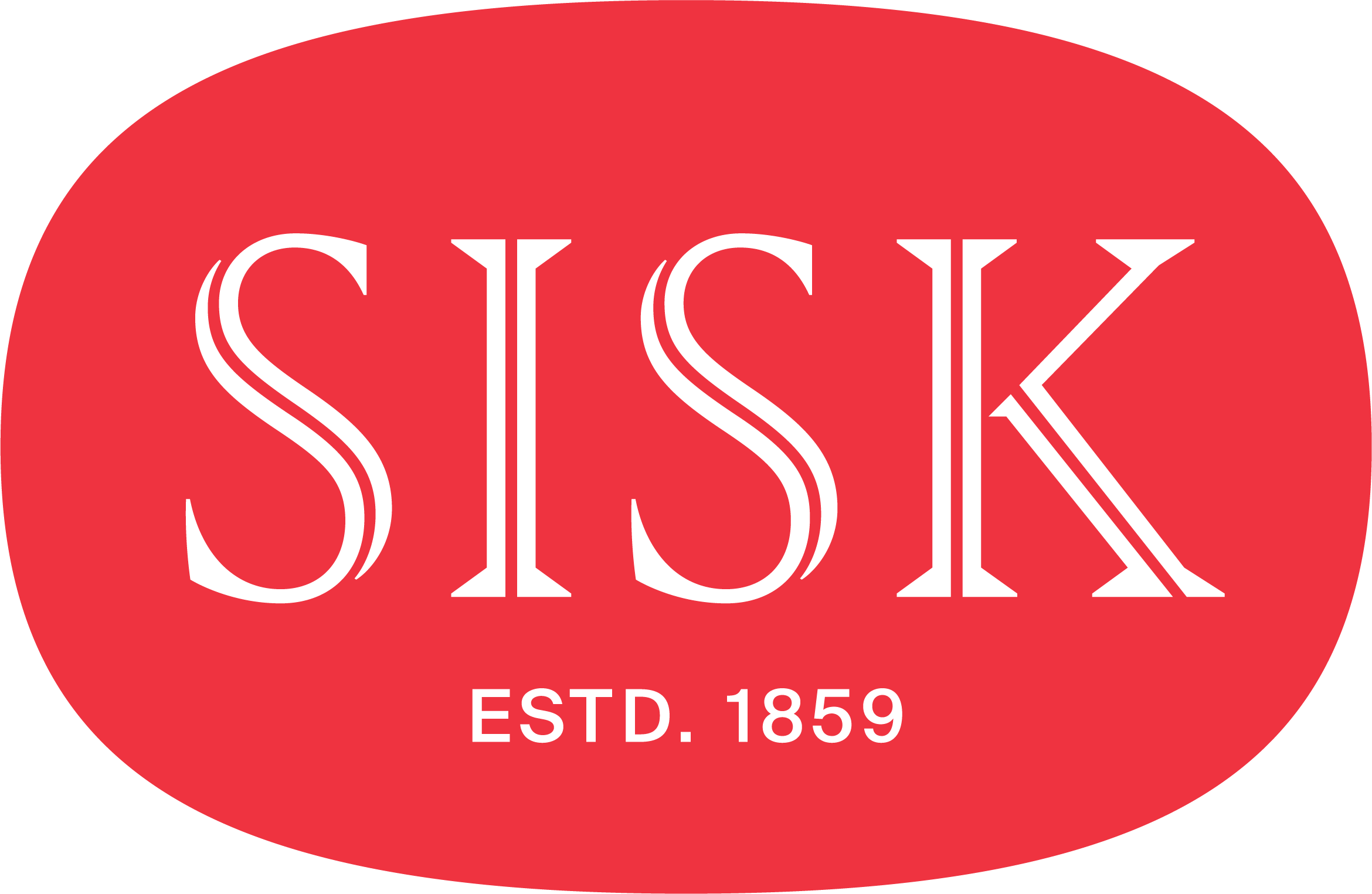
- Type: Private
- Industry: Construction
- Founded: 1859
- Founder: John Sisk
- Headquarters: Dublin, Ireland
- Website: www.sisk.com

Sisk Group is a construction and property company founded in Cork, Ireland in 1859 with operations in Ireland, United Kingdom, Belgium, Denmark, and Sweden.

== History ==
After an apprenticeship as a plasterer and at the age of 22, John Sisk set up the construction business in 1859.

In April 2019, Sisk was removed from the UK Government's Prompt Payment Code for failing to pay suppliers on time. It was reinstated around 10 months later.

The company relocated 200 of its employees into its newly retrofitted head office at Citywest in Dublin in July 2024.

== Projects ==
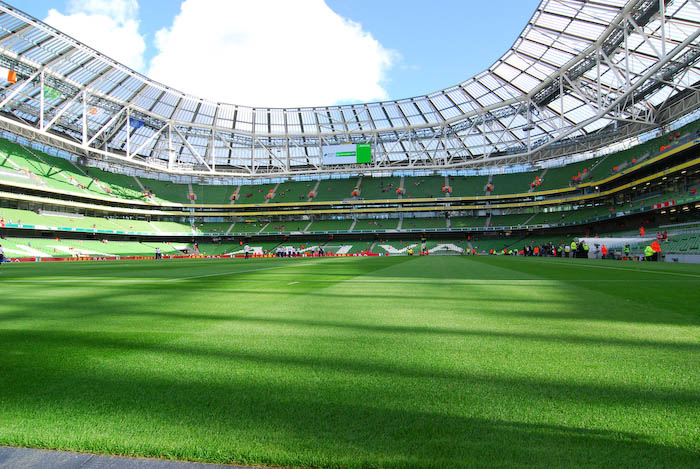
Aviva Stadium, Dublin

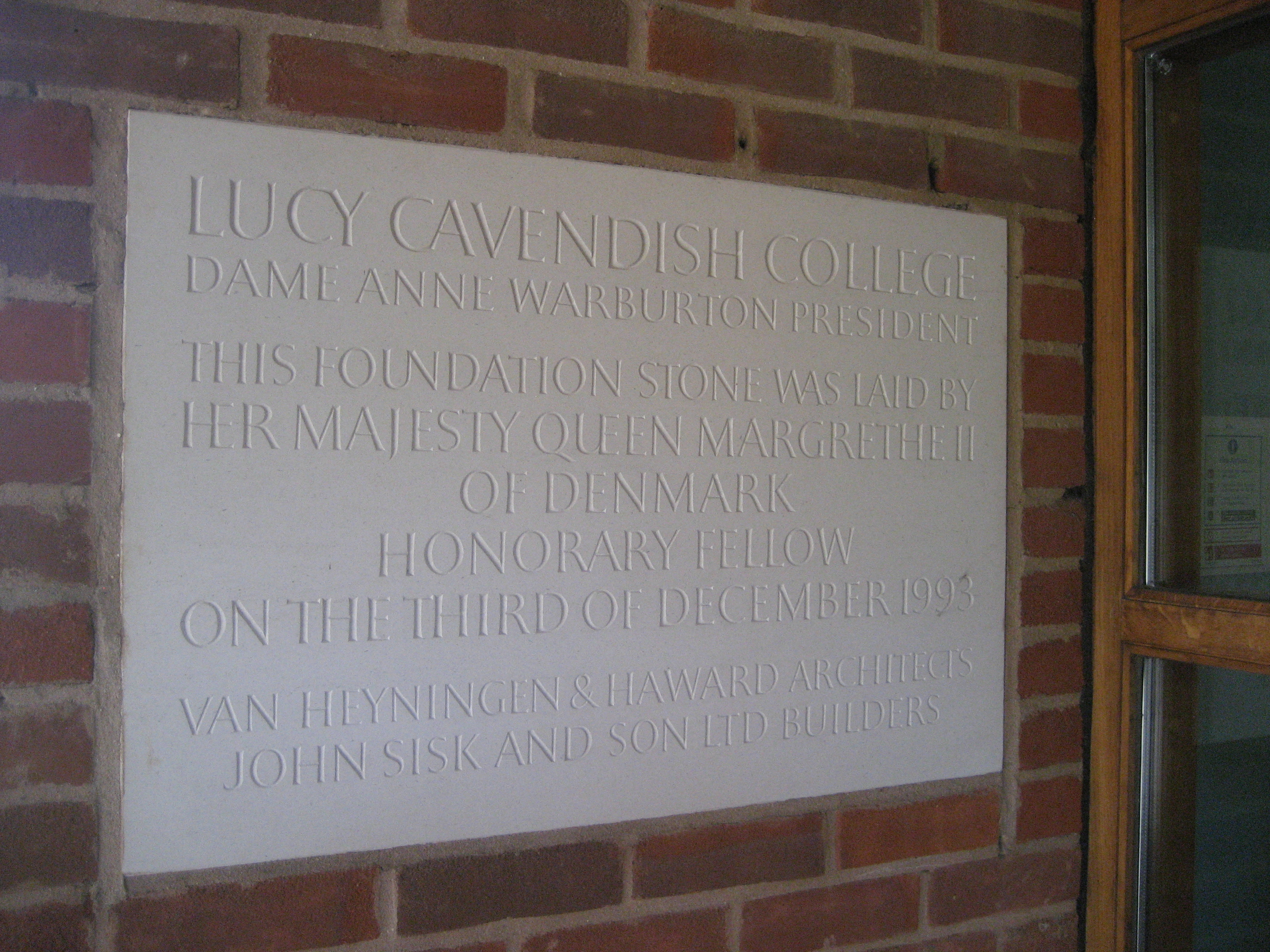
Warburton Hall, Lucy Cavendish College, Cambridge

Major projects involving the company include:

- City Hall, Cork, completed in 1936
- Central Bank of Ireland building, Dublin, completed in 1978
- New Cusack Stand at Croke Park, completed in 1995
- Warburton Hall, Lucy Cavendish College, Cambridge, completed in 1995
- Blanchardstown Centre, Dublin, completed in 1996
- American Air Museum, Duxford, completed in 1997
- Aviva Stadium, Dublin, completed in 2010
- Grand Canal Theatre, Dublin, completed in 2010
- Convention Centre Dublin, completed in 2010
- Limerick Tunnel, completed in 2010
- Expansion of the St. James's Gate Brewery, Dublin, completed in 2013
- Capital Dock, Dublin, completed in 2018
- International Convention Centre Wales, Newport, completed in 2019
- Crossrail Eastern Running Tunnels, completed in 2021
- Northern Approach of Colchester Rapid Transit, due to complete in 2025
