= Crow (heraldry) =

Class of birds depicted in heraldry

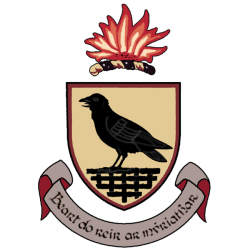
Former County Dublin coat of arms

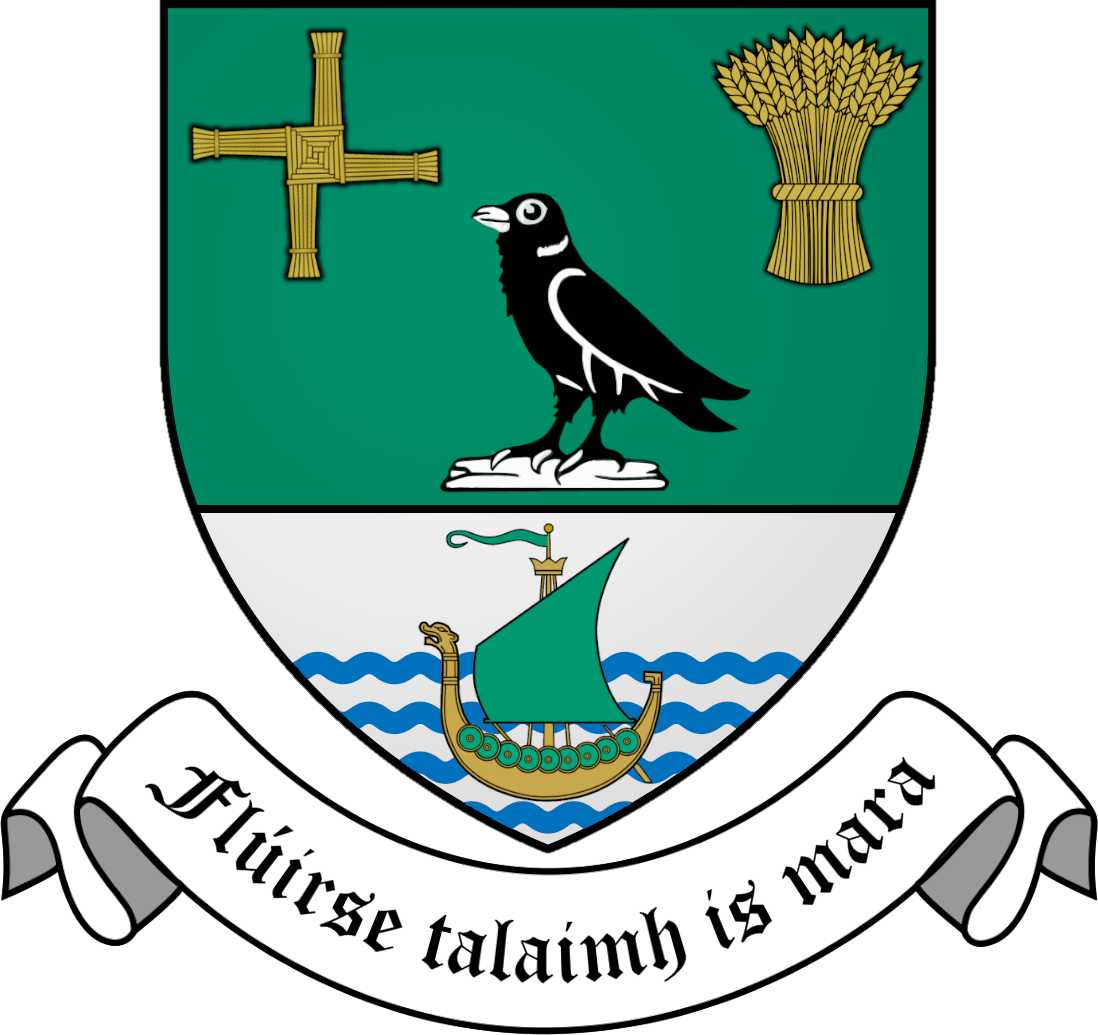
Fingal coat of arms

In heraldry, crows, rooks, and ravens are not distinguished from each other. As with all birds that are not eagles, a crow or raven is depicted by default as close, but they can uniquely be blazoned as speaking. Crows may also be called corbies, as in the canting arms of Corbet.

The Cornish chough is also depicted in heraldry, which looks similar but has a red beak and feet. Anciently, the Cornish chough is sometimes called a beckit. The chough features on the coat-of-arms of Canterbury, England, probably as a play on their alternative name 'beckit' and St Thomas Becket, strongly associated with the city. Indeed, the beckit name may be a consequence of the association with the coat-of-arms, and the blazon: 'Argent, three Cornish choughs, beaked (or beckit) and legged gules...'. The connection with the chough may reflect their common presence in Kent at the time or perhaps a legend that the red beak and legs are a result of the bird dipping them in the blood of the saint. On the coat of arms of County Dublin and Fingal in Ireland, the crow was adapted from the raven banner of the Vikings, who had settled in the area. Lisbon, the capital of Portugal and Wagga Wagga, Australia have crows in their coats-of-arms.

The Hungarian family Hunyadi also used the raven in their coats of arms. Matthias Corvinus of Hungary named his famous library (Bibliotheca Corviniana) after the bird. It might have inspired the uniform and name of his mercenary army (Black Army of Hungary), and his illegitimate son, János Corvinus also wore the bird's name.

The Corbet (Corbel, Corby, Corbe) family from the Channel Islands are also names having been corrupted over time from the Latin word corvus, for raven.

== See also ==
- Raven banner
