= Tendring Colchester Borders Garden Community =

Infrastructure project in Colchester, England

Tendring Colchester Borders Garden Community is a proposed infrastructure project in north east Essex, England.

The proposal, positioned mainly in Tendring District with some encroachment into Colchester, includes the development of 7,500 - 9,000 buildings, including suburban and high density housing. An envisaged central area would include a business hub, apartments, mixed use buildings and a central plaza with a forum. Other resources in the area may include student accommodation, an hotel, schools and health care facilities.

The development is to be served by a new road, to be designated the A1331, with connections to the A120 and A133. Construction started in 2024, but government funding for that road was discontinued in 2025 after the £99 million budget was exceeded, putting the entire project in question
