= Roman River =

River in Essex, England

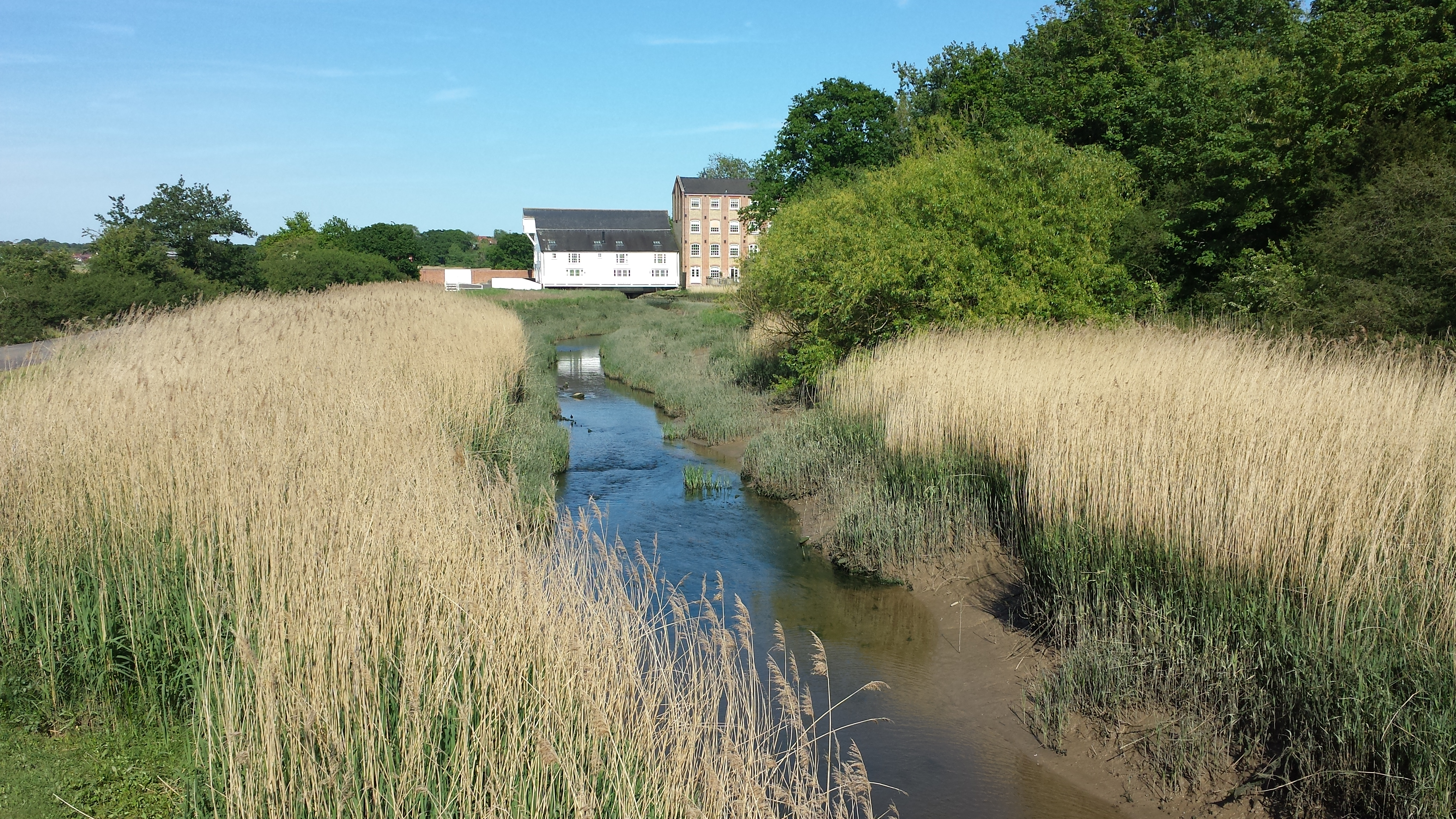
- The Roman River above the former tide mill and granary at Fingringhoe

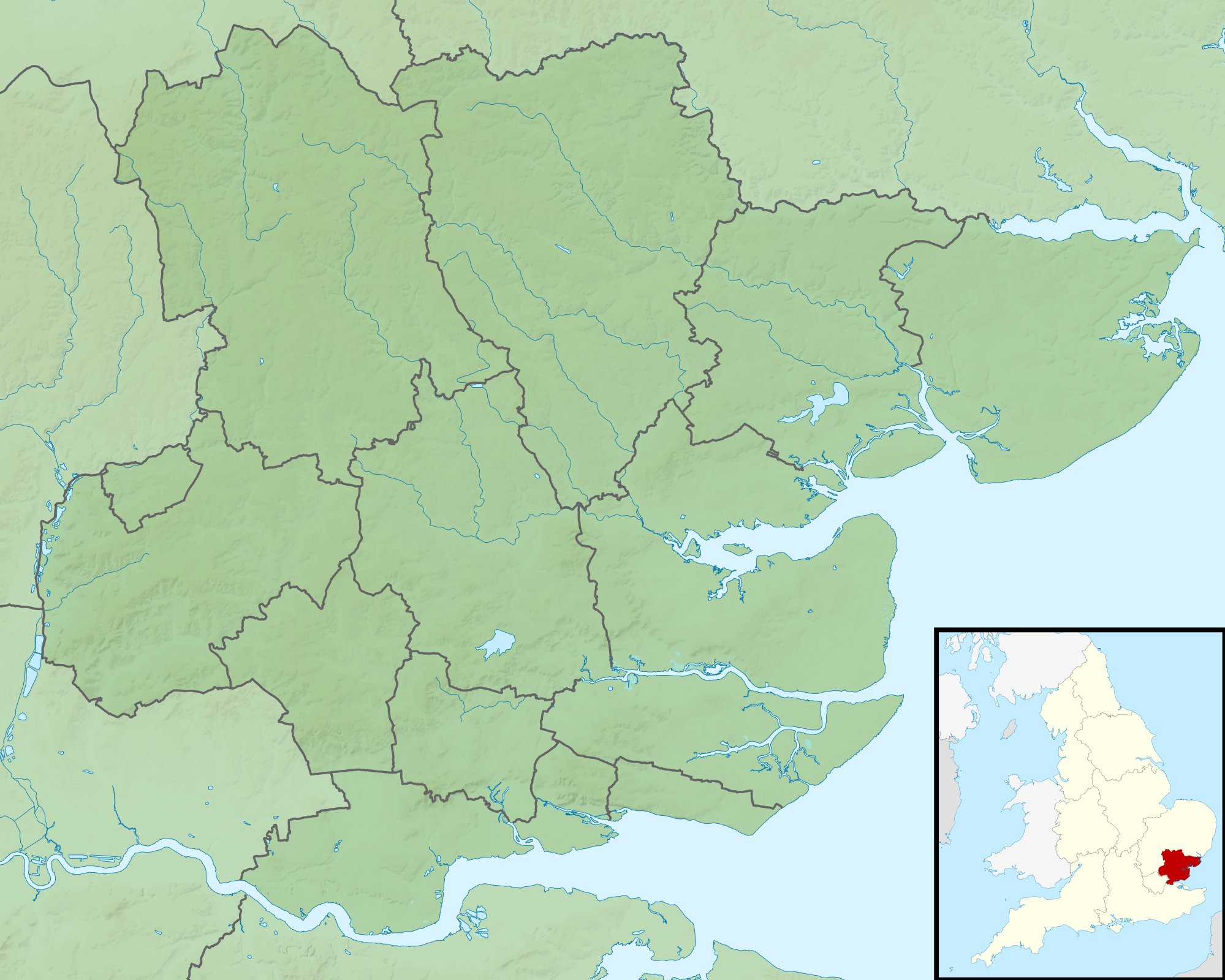
- Location of the river mouth within Essex

Location
- Country: England
- County: Essex

Physical characteristics
- Source
  - location: west of Great Tey
  - coordinates: 51.8951°N 0.7041°E
  - elevation: 58 m (190 ft)
- Mouth: River Colne
  - location: opposite Wivenhoe
  - coordinates: 51.8537°N 0.9541°E
  - elevation: 0 m (0 ft)

Basin features
- River system: River Colne
- Tributaries
  - right: Birch Hall Brook, Layer Brook

The Roman River is a river that flows entirely through the English county of Essex. It is a tributary of the River Colne, flowing into its tidal estuary below Colchester. The lower end of the Roman River is also tidal, with tidal water flowing upstream to just above Fingringhoe.

In the past, the river was important for milling. There was a tide mill at Fingringhoe, which was used between about 1520 and 1893, when it was replaced by a steam roller mill. Further upstream, Layer de la Haye Mill was a conventional watermill with a longer history, as the first mill on the site was mentioned in the Domesday Book. It was a corn mill, but finished its working days grinding product for a mushroom farm, built nearby. There were two further mills on the river, of which all trace has gone.

The Roman River has two major tributaries, the Birch Hall Brook and Layer Brook. The latter used to supply some of the water for Abberton Reservoir, through which it flowed. However, work to extend it began in 2009, and water from the upper Layer Brook is now pumped into the reservoir, because its level has been raised by 10.5 feet (3.2 m). The reservoir is of international importance for wildlife, and has several conservation designations to protect its status. The Essex Wildlife Trust operate a visitor centre near the raised dam, which enables visitors to see the large bird populations.

== Route ==
The Roman River rises from springs to the west of Great Tey. Three small streams merge, before the channel passes under the Great Tey to Little Tey road. It then passes under the railway line from Marks Tey to Chappel and Wakes Colne and another minor road, before reaching a major bridge under both the Great Eastern Main Line and the A12 road to the north of Copford. It turns to the south-east, to reach the B1022 road at Heckfordbridge. It is joined by a tributary flowing north-eastwards from Birch, and turns again to the east, passing under the B1026 Kings Ford Bridge to the north of Layer de la Haye. The channel widens to form the mill pond for Layer de la Haye watermill. On the south bank is Roman River Valley, a 44-acre (18 ha) nature reserve, managed by the Essex Wildlife Trust.

Another minor road crosses the river at Bounstead Bridge. This was formerly known at Brownsford, and the first bridge was built around 1563. After the bridge, the river flows along the southern edge of Friday Wood. This is one of the few remaining sites of unimproved acid grassland in Essex, and is notable as the habitat for over 1000 species of moths and butterflies. It is a Site of Special Scientific Interest (SSSI), and forms part of the Roman River SSSI. Layer Brook joins from the south, which is the outflow from Abberton Reservoir. Just before it reaches the B1025 Manwood Bridge, it has descended to a level where it becomes tidal. Beyond the bridge is Donyland Wood, formerly a separate SSSI, but now part of the Roman River SSSI. Together, the two areas of woodland cover 680.90 acres (275.55 ha). The river between Manwood Bridge and that at Fingringhoe. has been modified. The river was diverted to follow a more direct route cutting off two large meander loops. This was probably done in the early part of the nineteenth century as part of a scheme to improve land use. Water was tapped off from the diverted section of the river to supply a catchwork Water-meadow to the north of the river just before it crosses under the bridge at Fingringhoe.The present Fingringhoe bridge was built in 1923, but replaced an earlier structure, as there has been a bridge at the site since at least 1875. Having passed under Fingringhoe Mill, the river turns towards the north-east, and joins the River Colne opposite Wivenhoe.

=== Layer Brook ===
The main tributary of the Roman River is Layer Brook. This rises near Tiptree Heath, close to the 160-foot (50 m) contour, and passes under a minor road and the B1023 on the northern edge of Tolleshunt Knights. It continues to the north east, and at Layer Marney, turns to the south east, flowing over a weir to enter Abberton Reservoir. A weir and bridge allow the water from the first section of the reservoir to flow under the Layer Breton causeway into the second section. In December 2009, a contract was awarded to raise the level of the main section by 10.5 feet (3.2 m). This increased the surface area of the reservoir from 1.8 square miles (4.7 km^{2}) to 2.5 square miles (6.5 km^{2}), and involved moving the B1026 road to the north of the second causeway further to the west. Water can no longer move from the west of the reconstructed causeway into the main reservoir by gravity, and a pumping station was constructed in its centre to achieve this. The reservoir is of international importance for wildlife, and is an SSSI, a designated Ramsar site in recognition of its wetland status, and a Special Protection Area in order to safeguard its habitats for migratory birds. The expansion project included the construction of a new visitor centre, which is run by Essex Wildlife Trust, and enables visitors to see some of the 40,000 birds that visit the site annually. The Layer Brook resumes after the dam at the north-eastern corner of the reservoir, and joins the Roman River after passing under the road that runs from Layer de la Haye to the village of Abberton.

== Milling ==
Fingringhoe Mill was a tide mill. The present building dates from the late 18th or early 19th centuries, and is timber-framed, with two storeys and weatherboard cladding. From 1952 it was covered externally in asbestos sheeting. It was Grade II listed, despite being hidden from view. The first mill on the site was built in 1520 or 1531. The incoming tide filled the pool behind the mill, and as the tide dropped, the water was fed along a mill race to drive a large breastshot waterwheel. Milling could take place for up to eight hours per tide. The tide mill was rebuilt in 1750, but in 1893, a steam roller mill was erected, and use of the tide mill ceased.

The mill was used to grind flour, but this ceased as a condition of the sale when the mill was sold in 1931. Subsequently, it was used to produce animal feedstuffs, particularly steam-cooked barley, maize and oats. The mill burnt down in 1936, when the oil generators caught fire, but was rebuilt in corrugated iron sheeting, and became electrically powered. The tide mill was used briefly in 1942 during an extended power cut, but the waterwheel was removed in the 1950s.

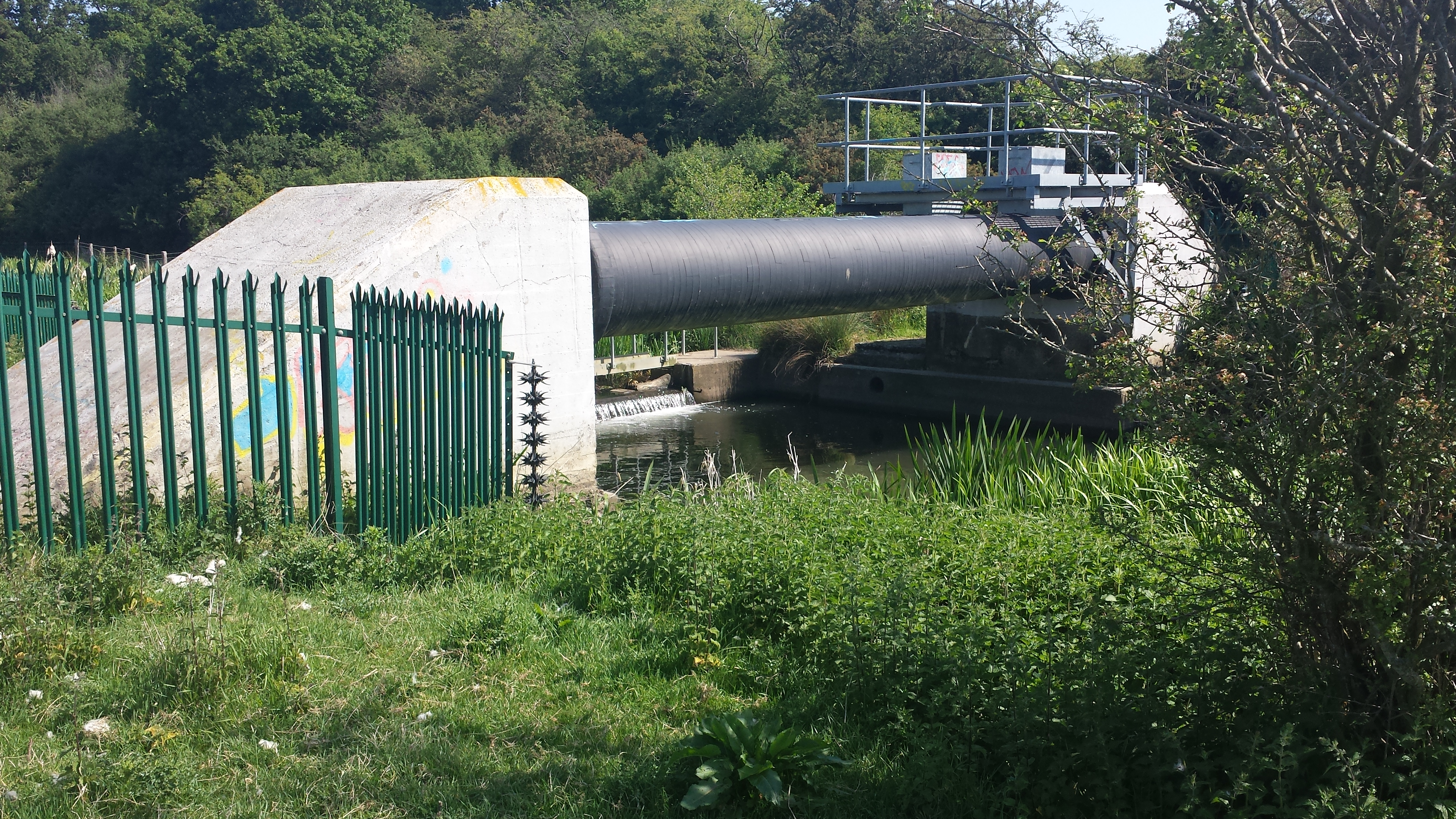
A gas pipeline crossing the Roman River just below its junction with Layer Brook

In 1997, a six-month project began to demolish the concrete silos and remove the asbestos, which revealed the mill building and a four-storey Victorian granary. Both were sympathetically restored and have been converted into homes, and in 2001 the work received a Best Restoration award from Colchester Civic Society. Set back from the river is the 17th century mill house. It is again timber-framed, with three storeys, with some brick and some plasterwork cladding. It was extensively modified in the early 19th century.

Further upstream, a watermill at Layer de la Haye was first mentioned in the Domesday Book. The manor of Layer de la Haye had been given to Eustace, Earl of Boulogne, after the Norman conquest, and he had built a water mill. It was the only place where his tenants were allowed to grind their corn, and he charged them for the service. In 1536, the mill was one of a number of properties in the area seized by Sir Thomas Audeley, Lord Chancellor of England, in the wake of the dissolution of the monasteries. The mill appears on a map of 1767, and about that time was let to a tenant miller called Edward Willsmore. In the nineteenth century, the millers were recorded as Dan Cooper until 1826, John Royce until 1870 and Joseph Norfolk until 1890. It was still shown on maps as a corn mill in 1923 but ended is days grinding a product used in the cultivation of mushrooms, when a mushroom farm was established on the north bank of the river nearby. It was converted into a house in 1960, when the wheel and machinery were removed, but retains a belt wheel on the front of the house, which suggests that the grindstones were powered by a steam portable engine when river flows were low. It was a conventional river-powered watermill, with a bypass channel to the north. The present building is of two storeys, with a timber frame, external weatherboarding, and a slate roof, which was Grade II listed in 1982.

There were two further mills on the river, although nearly all traces of them have disappeared. They were small affairs, serving the needs of the local population, and both were fulling mills, involved in the processing of cloth, particularly wool. Stanway Mill was on the main channel, about 0.75 miles (1.21 km) below Heckford Bridge, while Birch Mill was on a tributary that flows from an ornamental lake in Birch Park. It was about 0.5 miles (0.80 km) below the lake, and half that distance from Stanway Mill. Although many fulling mills were converted to corn mills, depopulation of the valley resulted in these two ceasing to be, Birch Mill sometime between 1770 and 1810, and Stanway Mill in the early 1800s. Small amounts of the foundations of Birch Mill can be traced, and there are the ruins of Bay Mill Cottages nearby, but there is no trace of Stanway Mill. Even the river bed fails to give any clues that there was once a mill pool at the Stanway site.

== Water quality ==
The Environment Agency measure the water quality of the river systems in England. Each is given an overall ecological status, which may be one of five levels: high, good, moderate, poor and bad. There are several components that are used to determine this, including biological status, which looks at the quantity and varieties of invertebrates, angiosperms and fish. Chemical status, which compares the concentrations of various chemicals against known safe concentrations, is rated good or fail. The Roman River is designated as "heavily modified", which means that the channel has been altered by human activity, and the criteria for this designation are defined by the Water Framework Directive.

The water quality of the Roman River was as follows in 2019.

Section	Ecological Status	Chemical Status	Length	Catchment	Channel
Roman River	Moderate	Fail	12.1 miles (19.5 km)	23.59 square miles (61.1 km^{2})	heavily modified
Colne (inc part of Roman River)	Moderate	Fail			heavily modified

Reasons for the ecological quality being less than good include runoff from agricultural land, discharges from sewage treatment works and the transport infrastructure, and surface water abstraction affecting the flow in the river. Like most rivers in the UK, the chemical status changed from good to fail in 2019, due to the presence of polybrominated diphenyl ethers (PBDE), perfluorooctane sulphonate (PFOS) and mercury compounds, none of which had previously been included in the assessment.

== Points of interest ==
Point	Coordinates (Links to map resources)	OS Grid Ref	Notes
Source of Roman River	51.8951°N 0.7041°E	TL861252	
Source of Roman River	51.8832°N 0.7294°E	TL879240	
Crossing under railway and A12 road	51.8840°N 0.7955°E	TL924242	
Source of Birch Hall Brook	51.8374°N 0.7975°E	TL928191	
Junction with Birch Hall Brook	51.8569°N 0.8412°E	TL957214	
Source of Layer Brook	51.8084°N 0.7217°E	TL877157	
Layer Brook enters Abberton Reservoir	51.8130°N 0.8171°E	TL942164	
Layer Brook joins Roman River	51.8441°N 0.8978°E	TL997201	
B1025 Manwood Bridge	51.8456°N 0.9182°E	TM011203	Tidal below here
Fingringhoe Tide Mill	51.8470°N 0.9460°E	TM030205	
Junction with River Colne	51.8537°N 0.9546°E	TM035213	

== Bibliography ==
- Benham, Hervey (1983). Some Essex Water Mills (2nd ed.). Mersea Bookshop. ISBN 978-0-9508919-0-3.
- Fautley, Matthew; Garon, James (2005). Essex Coastline: Then and Now. Potton Publishing. ISBN 978-0-9548010-0-7.
- Hopkirk, Mary (1934). "Story of Layer de la Haye". Essex County Telegraph. Archived from the original on 3 January 2021.
- Wilson, Daniel (2012). "Abberton Reservoir enhancement" (PDF). Water Projects Online. Archived from the original (PDF) on 3 March 2016.
