= Marks Tey =

Village in Essex, England

Coordinates: 51.876°N 0.772°E

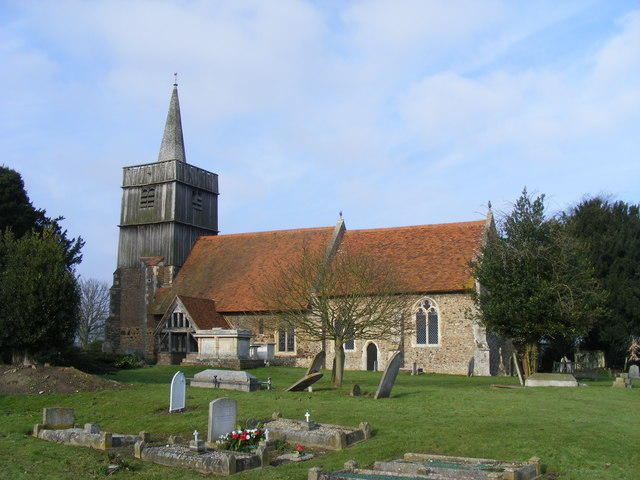
- St Andrew's Church

- Location within Essex
- Population: 2,617 (Parish, 2021)
- OS grid reference: TL908234
- Civil parish: Marks Tey
- District: Colchester
- Shire county: Essex
- Region: East
- Country: England
- Sovereign state: United Kingdom
- Post town: COLCHESTER
- Postcode district: CO6
- Dialling code: 01206
- Police: Essex
- Fire: Essex
- Ambulance: East of England
- UK Parliament: Witham

Marks Tey is a village and civil parish in the City of Colchester district of Essex, England; it is located six miles west of Colchester. It is one in a group of villages called The Teys, including Great Tey and Little Tey. At the 2021 census the parish had a population of 2,617.

== Amenities ==
Marks Tey's main features include a village hall built in 1993 on the fields intersecting the A12 and A120, with an adjacent children's play park and a skateboard park.

There is a small parish hall, used for children's kindergarten and small exhibitions. The hall was almost doubled in size after the extension of the new basketball hall. The hall and gardens also host a monthly artisan event called Marks Tey Market on the fourth Saturday of the month (from March to October).

The village has a parish church, St Andrew's. The church hall is central to the community, hosting 1st Marks Tey Scout Group with Beavers, Cubs and Scouts.

Following the demolition of the Prince of Wales public house, the Red Lion was the only pub serving the village, but this too closed down during the COVID-19 pandemic. In 2001, The Food Company erected their first outlet on the site of the former Prince of Wales, selling speciality foods and drink; however, the business closed in 2017. The premises were refurbished in 2021 and is now a solicitors' firm.

Also located on London Road are a post office, convenience store, fish and chip shop, Indian & Chinese take-aways, a butchers, bakers, hairdressers, a cycle shop, a car supplies shop, a petrol garage and a pharmacy.

== Sport ==
Marks Tey Football Club was established in 1998. The home ground is Jubilee Playing Fields in Old London Road, alongside the skateboard park. It currently has one men's Saturday team, one men's Sunday team, one veterans' team, two youth teams and two mini football teams.

In 2016, Marks Tey was light-heatedly named the 'home of English football' based on Google Search trends.

== Transport ==
Marks Tey railway station is a stop on the Great Eastern Main Line between London Liverpool Street and Ipswich; it is also a junction and eastern terminus for the Gainsborough Line to Sudbury. Passenger trains are operated by Greater Anglia. Services run generally half-hourly in each direction to Liverpool Street southbound and to Colchester and Ipswich northbound, with hourly services on the branch line to Sudbury.

Bus services are provided primarily by First Essex, including the 371/372 route between Chelmsford and Colchester. Other services are operated by Hedingham & Chambers to Colchester and Arriva Herts & Essex to Braintree and Colchester.

The village is located beside the A12 dual carriageway, which connects east London with Lowestoft. The A120 starts in Marks Tey, connecting the area with Braintree, Stansted Airport, Bishops Stortford and Puckeridge to the west.
