= Roman River SSSI =

Protected area in Essex, England

Coordinates: 51.848°N 0.896°E

Roman River
- Site of Special Scientific Interest
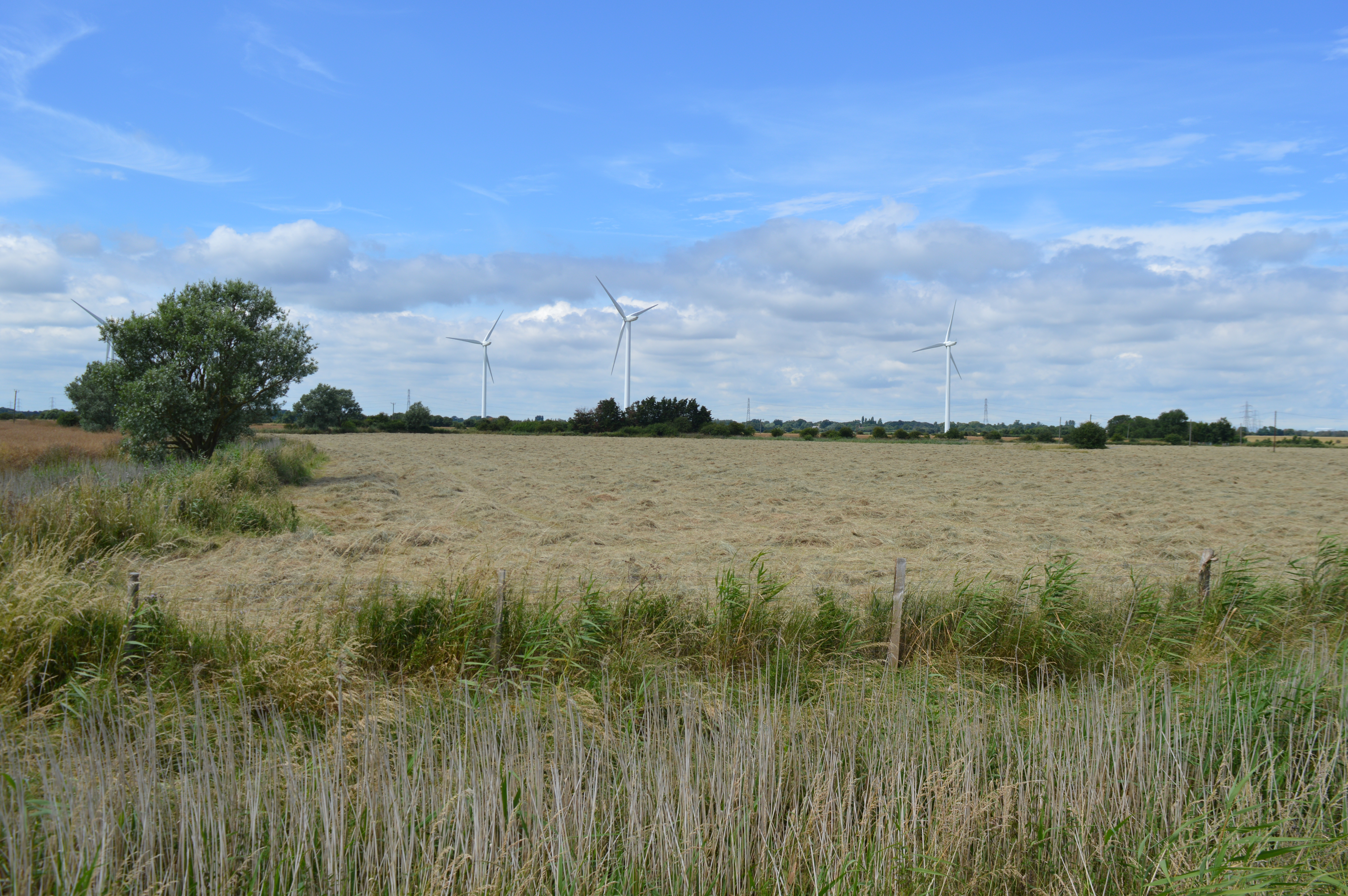
- Location of Roman River.
- Area of search: Essex
- Grid reference: TM 000210
- Interest: Biological
- Area: 275.6 ha (681 acres)
- Notification date: 1987
- Location map: Magic Map

Roman River is a 275.6-hectare (681-acre) biological Site of Special Scientific Interest (SSSI) south of Colchester in Essex. Two areas, Friday Wood and Donyland Wood, were formerly separate SSSIs.

The site is in two separate areas. The Roman River, after which the site is named, runs along the southern boundary of both of them. There are areas of woodland, grassland, fen, scrub and heath. The woodland it mainly ancient, and there are more than a thousand species of moths and butterflies, and nearly seventy of breeding birds, including hawfinches, tree pipits and yellow wagtails.

Footpaths and tracks runs through the site, including Cherry Tree Lane. Part of the land area designated as Roman River SSSI is owned by the Ministry of Defence
