= St Andrew's Church, Marks Tey =

St Andrew's Church
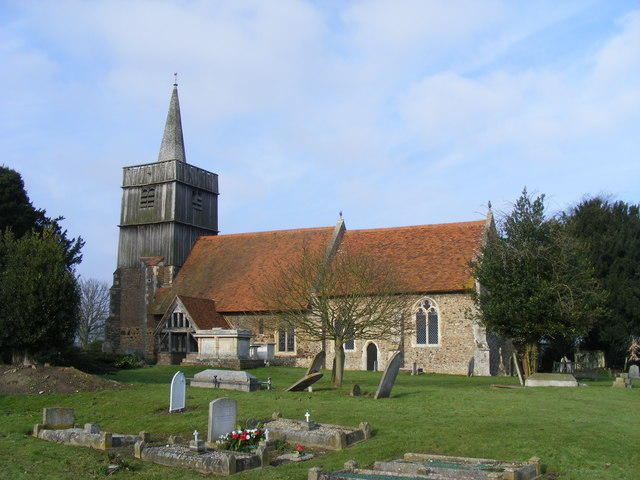
- Exterior, showing the wooden top of the tower
- St Andrew's Church
- 51°52′51″N 0°46′32″E
- Country: England
- Denomination: Church of England
- Previous denomination: Roman Catholic
- Churchmanship: Charismatic Evangelical
- Website: Official website

History
- Status: Active

Architecture
- Heritage designation: Grade I listed
- Designated: 7 April 1965

Administration
- Province: Canterbury
- Diocese: Chelmsford
- Parish: Marks Tey

Clergy
- Rector: Ian Scott-Thompson

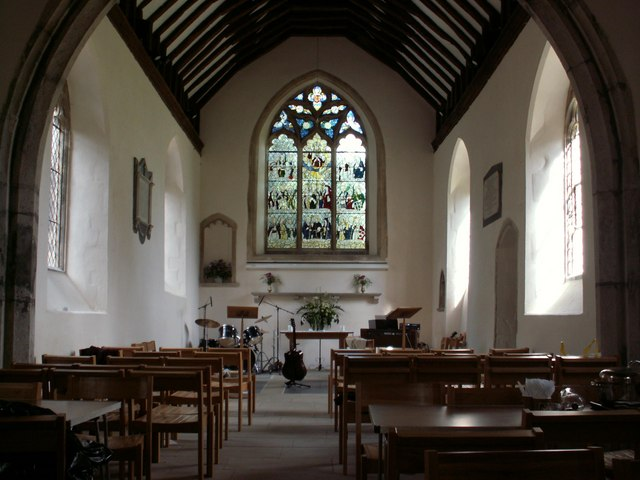
The chancel

St Andrew's Church is a Church of England parish church in the Essex village of Marks Tey. It was Grade I listed in 1965.

Its nave was built around 1100, using coursed walls of mixed rubble, puddingstone and Roman bricks, possibly from an undiscovered villa in the area. Its chancel was rebuilt around 1330, with a sedilia (recessed stone seating for the clergy), a piscina (a stone basin for washing communion vessels), a mid or late 14th-century chancel arch and a blocked-up doorway to a former rood screen, which would once have supported a cross.

The current west tower and small spire are 16th century but may represent a rebuild of one from the later 14th century. Its base is of brick and rubble and the upper two-thirds of timber. The south porch is also 16th century, whilst the font cover is early 17th century. The whole building was restored in the 19th century.

A Millennium window, by Susan McCarthy, incorportates various themes reflecting the history of the village and that the Gospel message has not changed.
