= Great Tey =

Village in Essex, England

Coordinates: 51.900029°N 0.747933°E

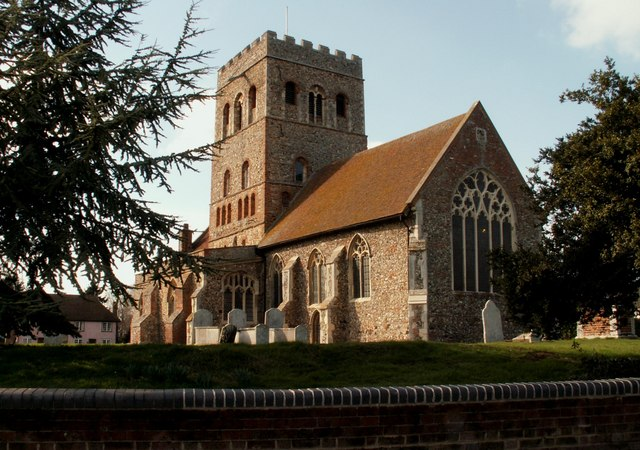
- Barnabas Church

- Location within Essex
- Population: 921 (Parish, 2021)
- OS grid reference: TL891259
- Civil parish: Great Tey
- District: City of Colchester
- Shire county: Essex
- Region: East
- Country: England
- Sovereign state: United Kingdom
- Post town: COLCHESTER
- Postcode district: CO6
- Dialling code: 01206
- Police: Essex
- Fire: Essex
- Ambulance: East of England
- UK Parliament: Harwich and North Essex

Great Tey is a village and civil parish in the City of Colchester district of Essex, England. It is near the villages of Marks Tey and Little Tey, located approximately six miles west of Colchester. At the 2021 census the parish had a population of 921.

== Location ==
Great Tey is situated near Marks Tey railway station which is on the Great Eastern Main Line, and is a junction for the Sudbury Branch Line to Sudbury. It is near the A12, A120 and A1124 roads. It is part of a group of villages called the Teys, consisting of Marks Tey, Little Tey and Great Tey. The village is situated north of the Roman River. The parish of Great Tey is a small rural community that contains a few local amenities such as a village pub, a Norman church and a post office. In addition to this the parish has its own community website providing various details and key dates for local people.

In 1870 John Marius Wilson's Imperial Gazetteer of England and Wales described Great Tey as:

"TEY (Great), a parish in Lexden district, Essex; 2¼ miles NW of Marks-Tey Junction r. station, and 3½ NE of Coggeshall. It has a post-office under Kelvedon, and a fair on Trinity Monday".

Great Tey had a population of 911 according to the 2011 census.

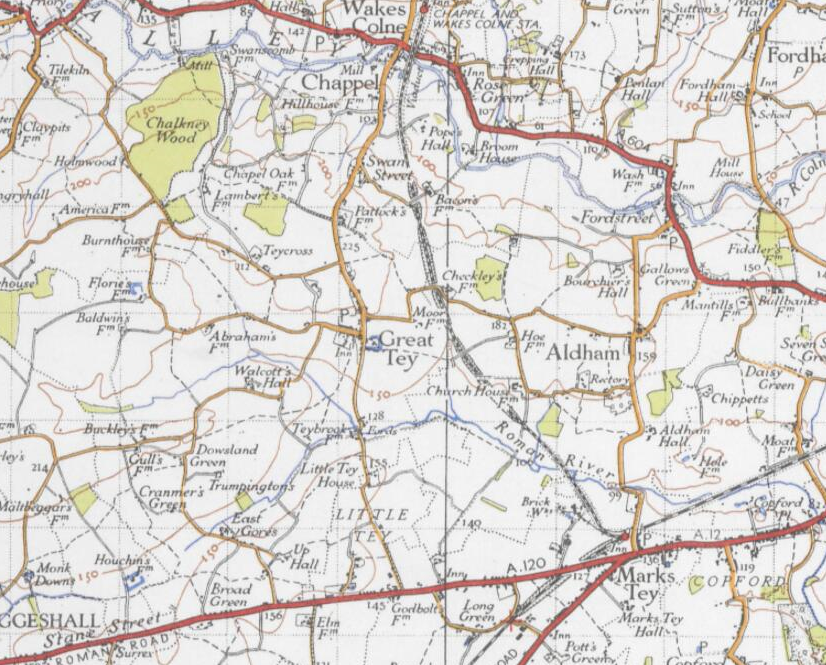
1945 map showing Great Tey and the surrounding area

== Governance ==
An electoral ward in the same name exists. This ward stretches north to Mount Bures and had a population of 2,695 at the 2011 census.

== Amenities ==
Within the area Great Tey has a primary school called Great Tey primary school. The school was judged a 'Good' school by Ofsted in March 2014 and awarded 5th place out of the top 12 Essex schools in the primary school performance tables 2013.

The parish contains a 16th-century pub named the Chequers and a village hall which features a lot in local activities, such as "social events with beavers, cubs, scouts, karate, brownies, rainbows, table tennis and the women's institute". Furthermore, a Youth Activity Club (YAC) operates there for the people of the local and further afield primary schools.

A local paper called the 'Round and About' is distributed monthly. It contains articles about local events, businesses and activities, and general village updates.

== St Barnabas Church ==
St Barnabas Church is a Norman church which is now thought to originate from before the Norman Conquest. The lower three stages of the tower probably date from Anglo-Saxon times. The tower walls are of reused Roman brick quoins from a Roman villa close by, Septaria which comes from the cliffs close to Walton-on-the-Naze, and iron stone conglomerate found in local fields and flint.

== Occupation ==
In total there are 476 people aged between the ages of 16 and 74 employed in the area of Great Tey. Of this the vast majority are employed in the Managers, Directors and Senior Officials position with a total of 89. In contrast to this there are only a few employed in Skilled Trades Occupations such as Skilled Agricultural and Related Trades with a total of 18 which is a minor number compared to previous years which it was the main occupation. This is evident from the bar graph below which shows 80 men were employed in the agriculture in 1881. From these statistics the parish has moved with the times in terms of employment. This is evident from the fact throughout the UK more and more are employed in managerial jobs working in offices compared to the outdoor agricultural lifestyle that was the norm in earlier years.

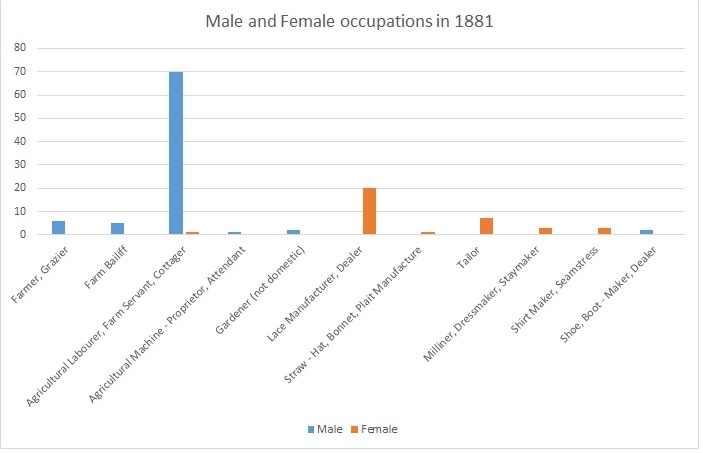
Male and Female Occupation in 1881

In addition to this statistics the vision of Britain site revealed that in the early years of 1831, of the population the majority of occupations related to status were labourers and servants with a total of 133. Contrasted to the 15 employers and professionals from the data provided. The majority of the 476 employed are in full-time employment with a total of 314. However, there are much less in part-time employment with numbers reaching only 162.

The number of men and women employed as 'professionals' is one way of assessing a change in occupations as time has progressed. in 1881 there were no males listed as professional and only 6 females similarly. However, as time has moved on many more are employed in such roles. The 2011 census revealed that 47 males are listed as professionals.

== Education ==
There are a small number of people still enrolled in education between the ages of 16 and 74. In total, there are 38 students; 21 are full-time students, but economically inactive, and 17 students are either economically active and either unemployed or employed.

Neighbourhood statistics reveals the qualification gained in the area of Great Tey in the 2011 census, and it is made evident that the vast majority of residents have gained some form of qualification. For example, the number of residents who have been awarded a degree such as a BA, BSc or PhD reaches 132.

== Housing ==
The majority of housing in the Great Tey area is unshared houses or bungalows that are detached, with a total of 226 out of 374 situated in the vicinity. There are 5 unshared flats, maisonettes and apartments and 1 in a commercial building. In terms of housing dynamics, the vast majority of household composition is one family households with a total of 278 out of the 374 in the area. Of the 374 households, 174 of these are owned outright, with only fractional amounts compared to a mere 20 in Private Rented or letting accommodation. With 17 of these household being Social Rented from the local Council, this number is very minimal considering there are 2,079,778 in England.

However these statistics have changed since the 2001 census. The reason for this is that it has been recorded that were 376 households, meaning in the ten-year gap two house have been lost meaning they were either not needed and removed or possibly been deemed to unsafe to inhabit, either would warrant a decline in total households over the years.

== Religion ==
In religious terms Great Tey was originally a predominately one religion parish, figures from the neighbourhood statistics database clarifies this showing of the 942 occupants in 2001, 792 confirmed they were of the Christian belief. In contrast there was only 6 Jewish members and only 3 of the Muslim faith showing that the dominant religion of the area is in fact Christian. This has remained the case for the most recent census data as of the 911 persons recorded in 2011 census, 649 are still of the Christian faith. However numbers have altered slightly of late with a decrease in the number of Jews and Muslims. In addition to this there has been an introduction of one Buddhist in the parish and 8 others have stated they are of religions not stated highlighting times have not changed in religious beliefs for Great Tey with Christianity being the prominent religion. However, these number fluctuate with ease with a new wider global acceptance of those of varying beliefs.

== Ethnicity ==
The lack of faiths in the parish of Great Tey is supported by the lack of ethnic minorities noted in the 2011 census. Of the 374 households there are 271 households where members have the same ethnic group. There are only 12 households where there are "Different Ethnic Groups Within Partnerships ... or not Different Ethnic Groups Between Generations". This clarifies that Great Tey is predominantly an English parish, with only a small proportion of ethnic minorities and such a lack of various faiths.

Although Great Tey is a traditional English rural parish, there are several locals who were born outside of the UK. The neighbourhood statistics data base listed that 872 of the villagers were born in England. However, there were 5 locals born in the EU other than Ireland, Wales and Scotland and another 20 inhabitants whose country of birth was other than the above stated.

Data from the 2011 census revealed that Great Tey is a very English ("and/or Welsh") parish with the lack of faith and ethnic groups: reflected in small number of inhabitants who speak languages other than English or Welsh. Of the population 883 of the 885 speak English or Welsh. The only other languages recorded are African, Afrikaans and Swahili/Kiswahili.

== Population ==
Great Tey has had a steady alteration in population numbers over the years. This is evident from the fact that in 1801 total population stood at 548 and slowly increased to 735 in 1851. However, there was a steep drop in population with figures stating in 1961 it dropped steeply to a mere 476. This number has rapidly climbed again as population for the most recent census stood at 911 for 2011. There are a number of factors that influence population movements and this is visible from statistics such as these showing how numbers vary so much in a short amount of time.

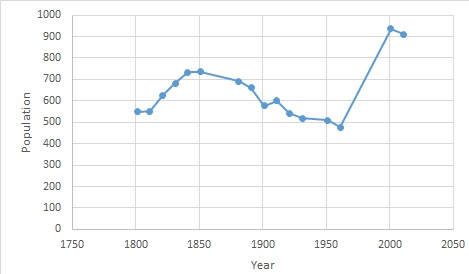
Total population of Great Tey Civil Parish, Essex

We can look at the make-up of Great Tey's population by separating males from females and assessing the dominant gender for the parish area. It is made clear through the statistics recovered from the vision of Britain website that the build of gender has altered throughout the years. The first census of 1801 reveals a perfect split of 274 males and 274 females. However these numbers alter throughout the course of time. This can be seen with the result of 1901 when numbers of males stood at over 300 whereas total number of females was a mere 276.

This trend continued ten years later with a steep rise in males again with numbers rising to 322 and females moving up only 3 more places contrasted to the 20 males revealed in neighbourhood statistics. Nonetheless, the pattern of gender throughout Great Tey is quite similar with there being no real distinct favourite over time. Looking at more recent time periods we can see that gender has remained close with the 2001 census revealing a total of 347 males compared to 338 females. And more recently in 2011 a total of 443 males and 468 females. The population of Great Tey is very varied age wise, many rural communities have an older population due to the quieter lifestyle and lower crime rates. However, Great Tey parish has varied ages with the largest age group being 35 to 54, with a total of 290. whereas in contrast there is only 75 occupants over the age of 75.

Of the population of Great Tey the vast majority of inhabitants are of good health. of the 911 locals listed in the 2011 census 766 of them are noted as being 'not limited' in contrast to the mere 30 who require 50 hours or more a week.
