= Go East Anglia =

Bus operator in the East of England

- Parent: Go-Ahead Group
- Founded: 2010; 16 years ago
- Ceased operation: 1 October 2025; 8 months ago
- Headquarters: Norwich
- Service area: Essex; Suffolk; Norfolk
- Service type: Bus & coach services
- Depots: 5
- Fleet: 190
- Chief executive: Rupert Cox
- Website: Go East Anglia

Go East Anglia was a bus operator in Essex, Suffolk and Norfolk, owned by the Go-Ahead Group until its purchase by Transport Made Simple on 1 October 2025. The group consisted of Konectbus and Hedingham & Chambers.

== History ==
Go East Anglia was initially formed in 2010, when the Go-Ahead Group purchased Konectbus.

In 2012, Go-Ahead also purchased Anglian Bus, Hedingham and Chambers. Anglian Bus was quickly merged into the Konectbus brand, rendering the name obsolete quickly.

On 22 September 2025, it was announced that the Go-Ahead Group had agreed to sell Go East Anglia to Transport Made Simple, who operate bus services in the region under the Central Connect brand. The Konnectbus brand was retained by Transport Made Simple, with the sale being completed on 1 October.

== Subsidiaries ==
Go East Anglia originally did not operate any buses in its own right, with all being legally operated by Konectbus Limited, H.C.Chambers & Son Limited or Hedingham & District Omnibuses Limited. However, the different companies remain distinct brands. In 2018, all the companies' vehicles were brought together under the Konectbus licence.

In March 2025, Go East Anglia announced it would begin to consolidate its bus operations in the East of England under the Konectbus brand from June 2025. The original Konectbus operation was renamed Konectbus Norfolk, while the operations of Hedingham & Chambers were rebranded Konectbus Essex and Suffolk.

- Konectbus – Norfolk
  - Park and Ride Norwich – A Konectbus brand operating the Park and Ride contract in Norwich.
- Hedingham & Chambers – Essex & Suffolk
  - Hedingham – Essex
  - Chambers – Suffolk

== Fleet ==
As of November 2019, Go East Anglia operated 190 buses and coaches from nine depots.
