= Roman River Valley =

Nature reserve in Essex, England

Coordinates: 51.853°N 0.866°E

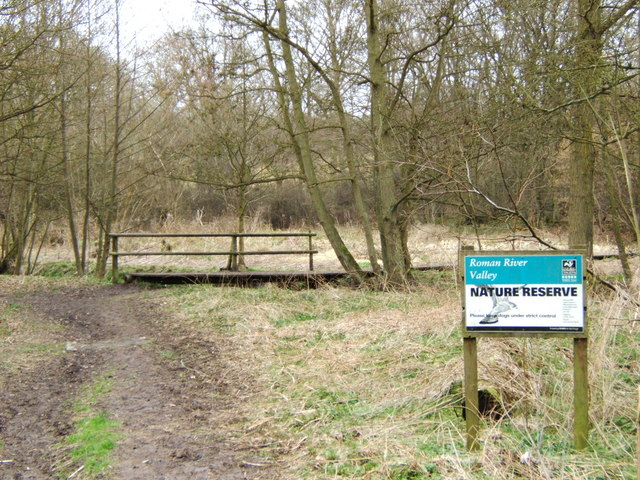
- Interactive map of Roman River Valley
- Type: Nature reserve
- Location: Layer de la Haye, Essex
- OS grid: TL 975 211
- Area: 17.8 hectares (44 acres)
- Manager: Essex Wildlife Trust

Roman River Valley is a 17.8-hectare (44-acre) nature reserve north of Layer de la Haye in Essex. It is managed by the Essex Wildlife Trust.

This wetland site along the Roman River has ancient woodland and marshes. Aquatic plants include the uncommon small teasel, and there are flowering plants such as yellow archangel and moschatel.

There is access from the B1026 road north of Layer de la Haye.
