= Hedingham & Chambers =

Bus operator in Essex, England

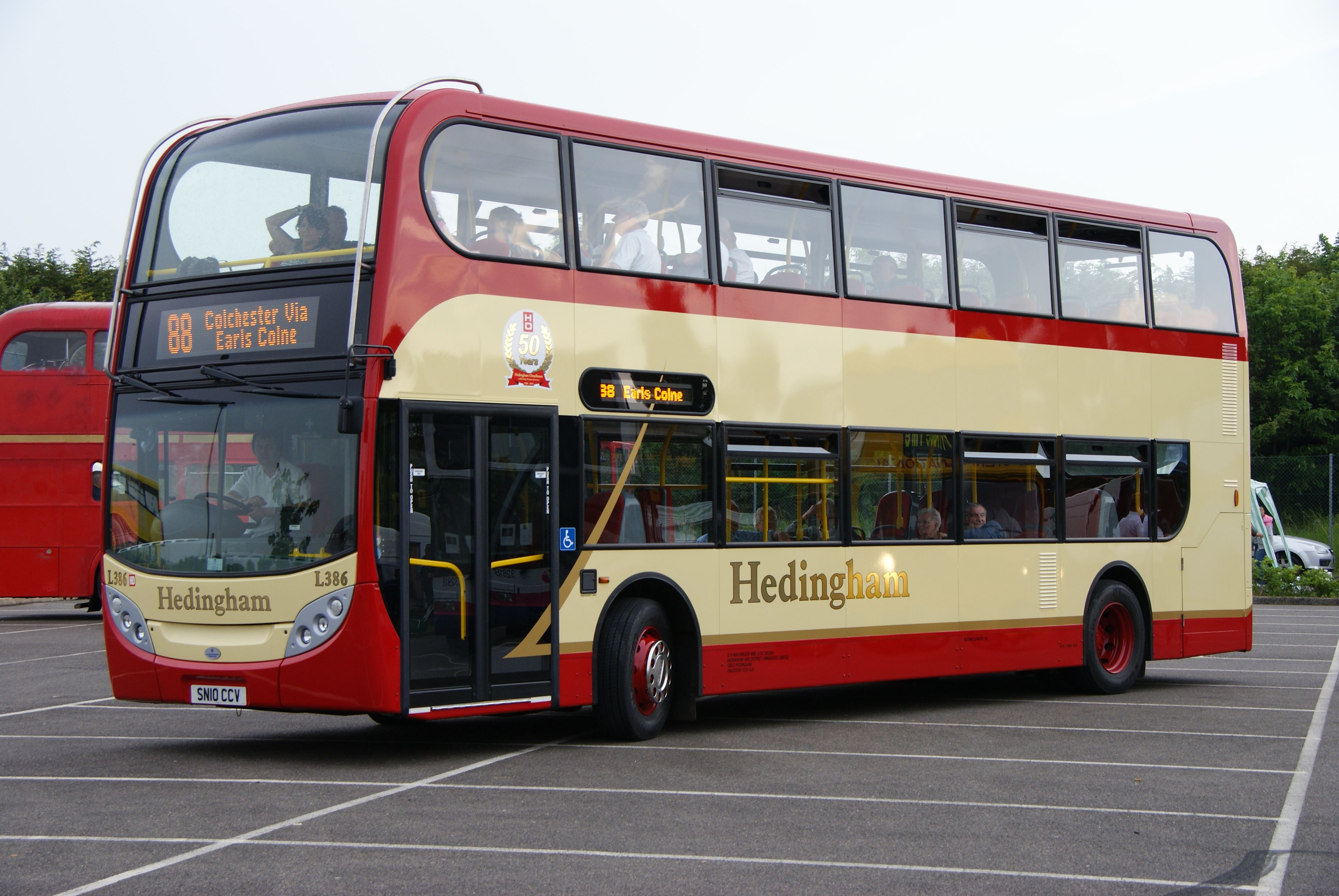
- A Hedingham Alexander Dennis Enviro400 showcased in 50th anniversary livery
- Parent: Go-Ahead Group
- Founded: 2012; 14 years ago
- Defunct: 2025
- Service area: North Essex and Suffolk
- Service type: Bus services
- Alliance: Go East Anglia
- Routes: 70
- Depots: Clacton, Kelvedon, Hedingham & Tollesbury (until 2016)
- Fleet: 114 Buses
- Website: hedinghamandchambers.co.uk

Hedingham & Chambers was a bus operator, part of the larger Go East Anglia unit within the Go-Ahead Group, consisting of the Hedingham and Chambers brands. The group was formed when Go-Ahead purchased the two firms in June 2012. After the sale, the two brands were retained with assets, such as depots, shared along with the launch of a unified website in 2021.

In March 2025, Go East Anglia announced it would begin to consolidate its bus operations in the East of England under the Konectbus brand from June 2025, with the Hedingham & Chambers names now being retired in favour of Konectbuses Essex and Suffolk and vehicles adopting a blue livery. In October 2025 Go East Anglia was acquired by Transport Made Simple, bringing Hedingham & Chambers, now Konectbuses Essex and Suffolk back into independent ownership, alongside its Norfolk based counterpart Konectbus Norfolk.

== Hedingham ==
Hedingham was a public bus brand operated by Hedingham & Chambers in Essex, itself a subsidiary of the Go-Ahead Group (forming part of the Go East Anglia).

Hedingham

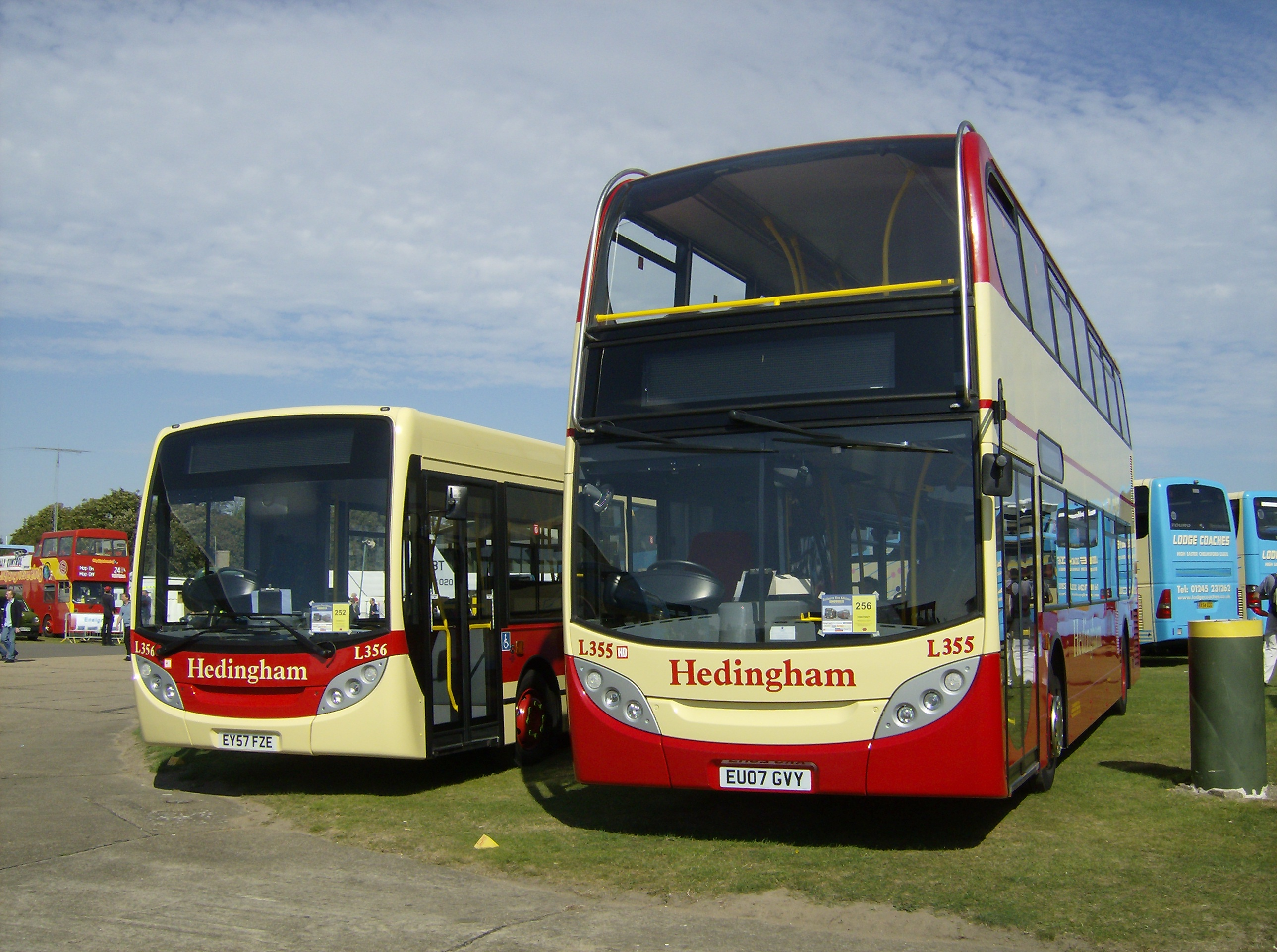
- Alexander Dennis Enviro200 and Alexander Dennis Enviro400 in September 2007
- Parent: Go-Ahead Group (Go East Anglia)
- Founded: 1921; 105 years ago
- Service area: North Essex and Suffolk
- Service type: Bus services
- Routes: 56 (October 2020)
- Depots: Clacton, Kelvedon, Hedingham & Tollesbury (until 2016)
- Fleet: 80 (November 2020)
- Operator: Hedingham & Chambers
- Website: hedinghamandchambers.co.uk

=== History ===
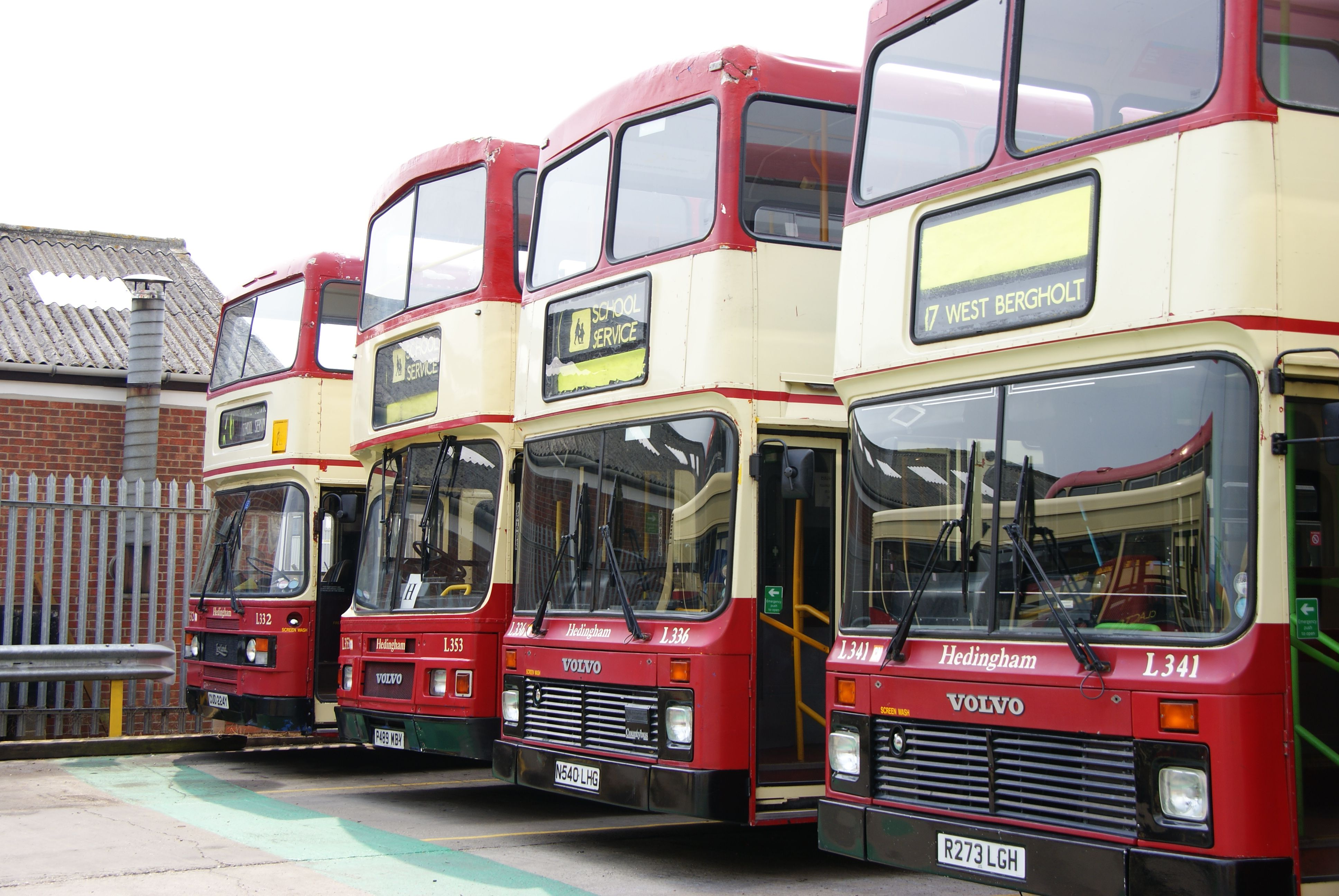
Leyland Olympians and Volvo Olympians in June 2010

In 1921 Aubrey Letch shortly after serving in World War I, with his parents' help, trading under his own name commenced operating a coach hire company, gradually expanding to run bus services to Braintree and Sudbury on their market days of Wednesday and Thursday respectively. In March 1935 Letch purchased the competing business of PW Finch of Castle Hedingham. This allowed Letch to take over the Monday to Saturday workers' service to Braintree. In the late 1950s, he further expanded the business with routes to Gestingthorpe, Pebmarsh and Halstead.

In early 1960, Letch retired due to ill health and sold the company to Donald MacGregor, which was renamed Hedingham & District Omnibuses. Since then the company has grown by acquiring other companies, including:

- Blackwells of Earls Colne (1965)
- C & R Coach of Little Tey (1982)
- Freemans Coaches (1997)
- GW Osborne of Tollesbury (1997)
- Jennings of Ashen (1984)
- Kemps Coaches of Clacton-on-Sea
- CJ Partridge and Sons (Claireaux) of Hadleigh, Suffolk
- Wents of Boxford (1997)

In March 2012 the company was sold to the Go-Ahead Group, forming part of Go East Anglia. Following this, 'Hedingham' became the widely accepted company name and as such is no longer referred to as 'Hedingham Omnibuses'.

In June 2025, Hedingham merged into Konectbus along with Chambers.

=== Depots ===
Three depots are located in:

- Clacton
- Sible Hedingham
- Kelvedon

Hedingham used to have a depot in Tollesbury however it closed in 2016 due to cuts.

=== Livery ===
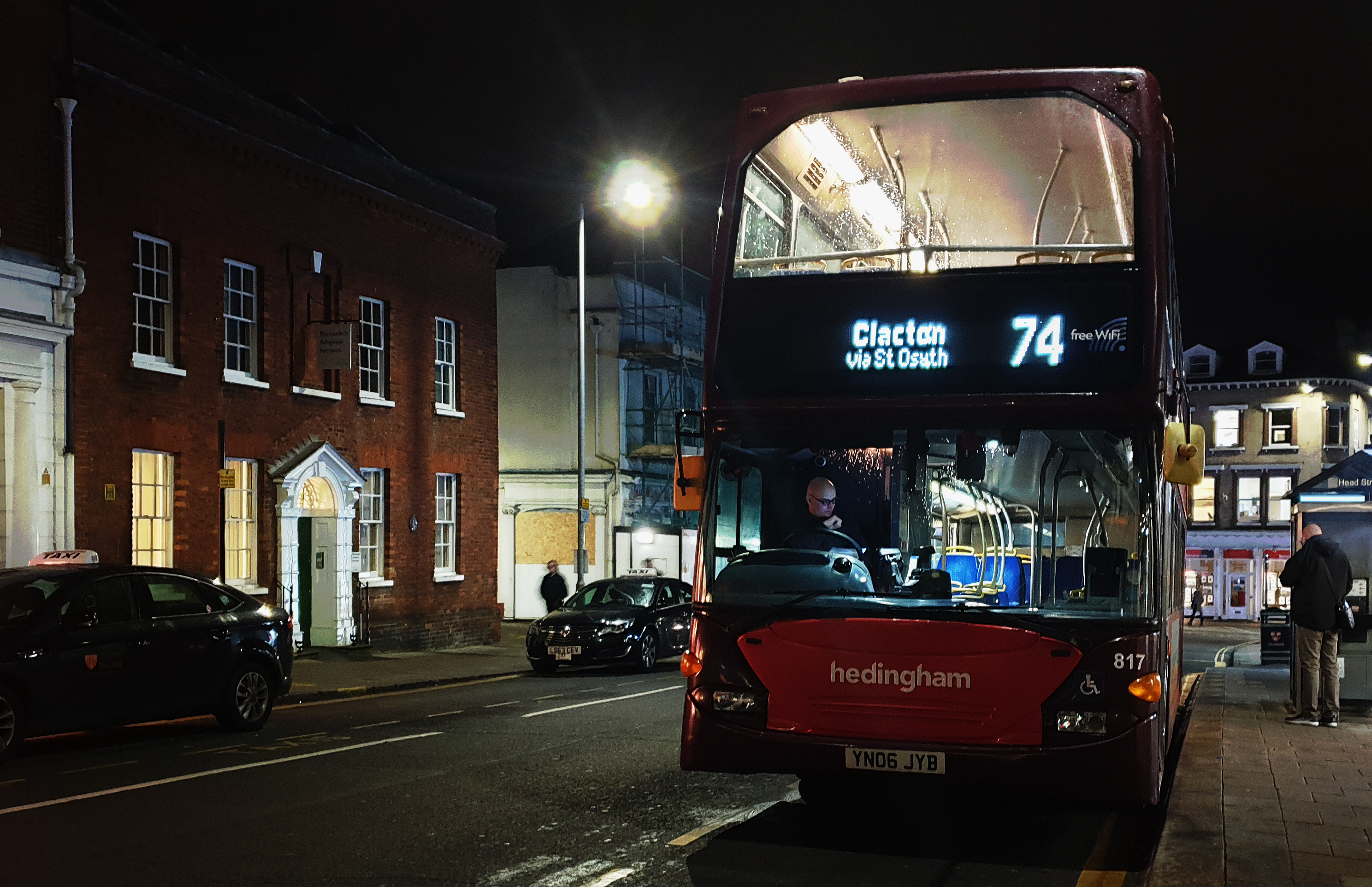
A Scania OmniDekka in Colchester in the new livery

Hedingham Omnibuses' livery was cream with red relief, until the 1970s being blue and cream. The livery varied between single deckers/ coaches and double deck buses, with red being the main colours on double deckers with cream relief. The GoAhead Group have, more recently, introduced a livery consisting of a red base, with a maroon front section - identical to that now used by Chambers.

Many buses are transferred from other Go-Ahead subsidiaries. These typically retain their former liveries, as they are end of life vehicles nearing scrapping, or the peak vehicle requirement requires all vehicles to be available, rather than being repainted. Recent transfers include buses from Konectbus, Carousel Buses and Go-Ahead London.

=== Operations ===
Hedingham operated in various areas of Essex, extending from Harwich in the north to Tollesbury in the south. The main centre of operations is Clacton-on-Sea, where the company took over the majority of the town's routes following First Essex's withdrawal. Hedingham also operates around Colchester, Halstead, Braintree and Witham, as well as serving villages and the island of West Mersea on council-supported routes.

Flagship routes for the company includes:

- 88: Halstead-Colchester (operated in a Quality Bus Partnership with First)
- 89: Braintree-Halstead
- 'The Seasiders'
  - X76: Jaywick-Clacton-Colchester
  - 63: West Mersea-Colchester
- 'Clacton Breeze'
  - An open-top bus service operating between Clacton-on-Sea and Holland-on-Sea during the summer season.

Some routes have received buses fitted with free wifi and route branding.

== Chambers ==
Chambers

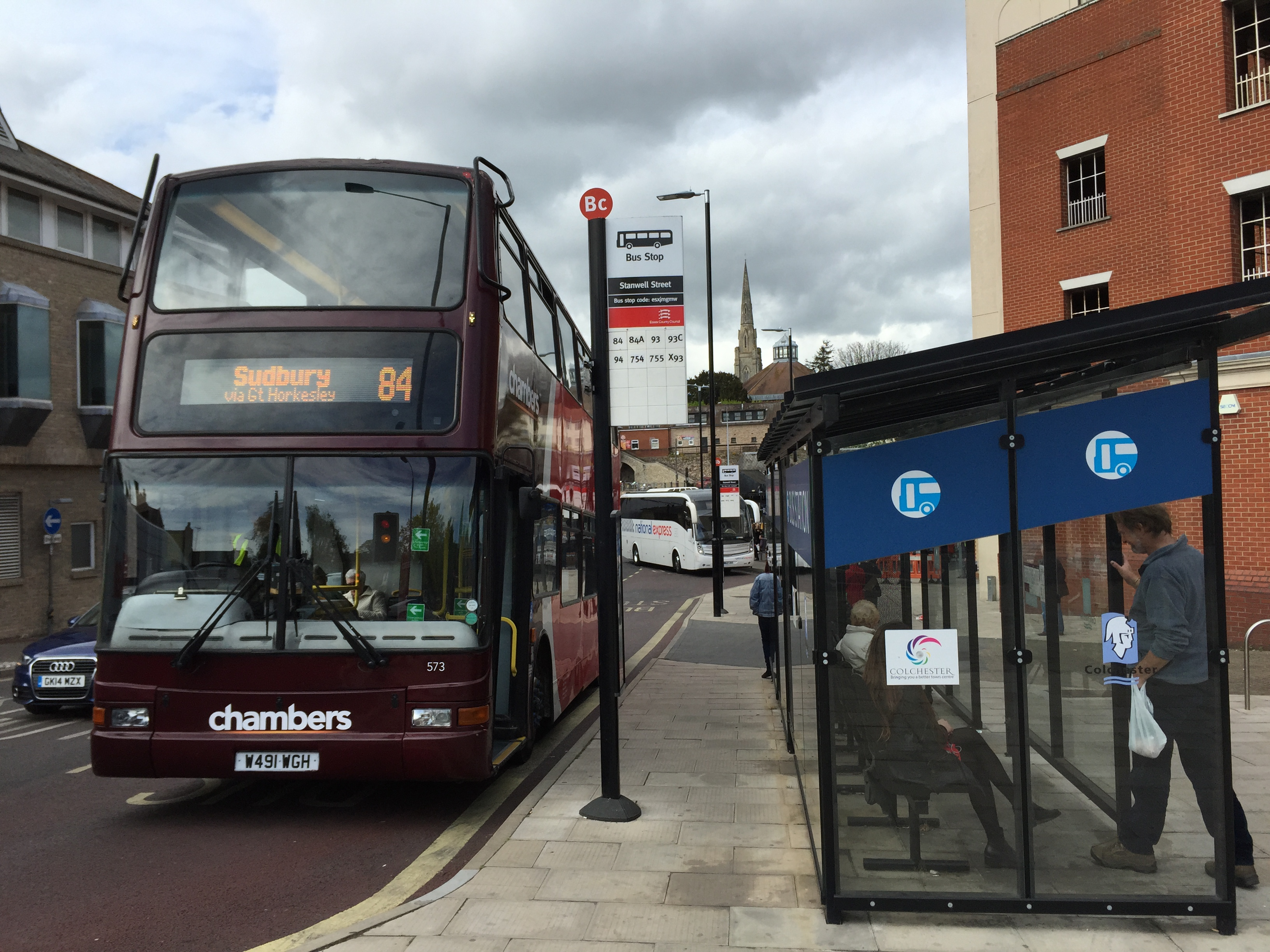
- Plaxton President bodied Volvo B7TL at Colchester Bus Station, in the new livery introduced following Go-Ahead's takeover.
- Parent: Go-Ahead Group (Go East Anglia)
- Founded: 1877
- Headquarters: Sudbury
- Service area: Essex; Suffolk
- Service type: Bus & coach services
- Routes: 14 (April 2019)
- Fleet: 34 (April 2019)
- Operator: Hedingham & Chambers

Chambers was a public bus brand operated by Hedingham & Chambers in Sudbury, Suffolk, itself a subsidiary of the Go-Ahead Group (forming part of the Go East Anglia).

=== History ===
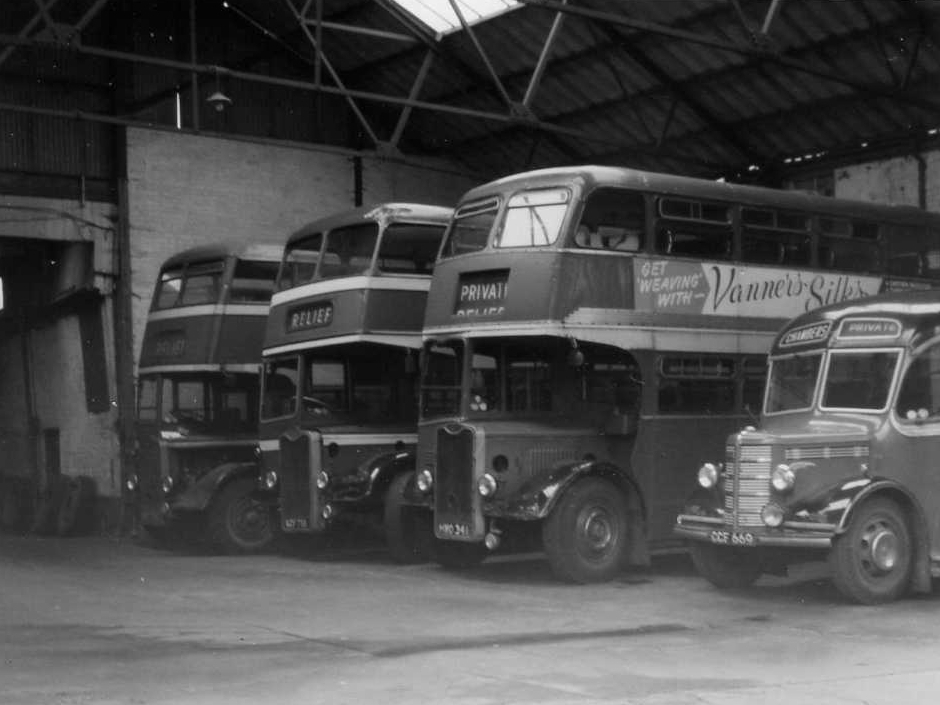
3 Guy Arabs and a Bedford OB in July 1970

In 1877 H Chambers commenced a horse-drawn bus business in Bures. In 1918 the first bus was purchased to operate a twice weekly service between Sudbury and Colchester. By the late 1930s routes were operated to Halstead and Haverhill. It also diversified into the haulage business, however Chambers exited from this business in the 1960s.

In June 2012 Chambers was sold to the Go-Ahead Group with 27 buses. The depot was not included in the sale with operations moving to fellow Go-Ahead company Hedingham in Sudbury although it still traded under the Chambers name.

In June 2025, the Chambers brand merged into Konectbus brand along with Hedingham.

=== Services ===
Chambers operated 14 services. Both urban and rural areas are served, many of the company's routes running into Sudbury, and serving the bus station near Sudbury railway station.

=== Fleet ===
The fleet consisted of 30 buses and 2 coaches. After the Go-Ahead purchase a new red and maroon fleet livery was introduced.

== See also ==
- List of bus operators of the United Kingdom
