= Little Tey =

Village in Essex, United Kingdom

Coordinates: 51.8799°N 0.7466°E

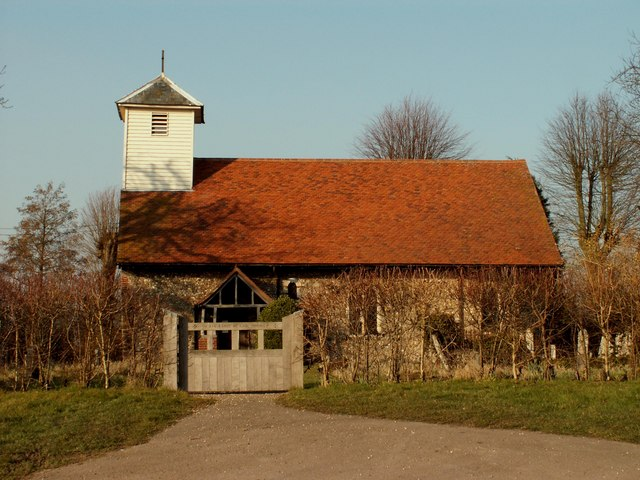
- St James the Less church

- Location within Essex
- Civil parish: Marks Tey
- District: Colchester
- Shire county: Essex
- Region: East
- Country: England
- Sovereign state: United Kingdom

Little Tey is a village in the City of Colchester district of Essex, England, located approximately six miles west of Colchester. It is in the civil parish of Marks Tey, having been a separate civil parish until 1949. In 1931 the parish had a population of 78.

== Location ==
It is near Marks Tey railway station, which is on the Great Eastern Main Line, and is a junction for the Sudbury Branch Line to Sudbury. It is near the A12 road, the A120 road and the A1124 road. It is one of a group of villages called the Teys, consisting of Marks Tey, Little Tey and Great Tey.

== Church ==
St. James the Less is a small and simple building of C12 Norman origins. It has several small Norman windows and an apsidal east end. The roof is thought to be 13th century and in the 14th century windows were added or enlarged to give more light. There is one bell, cast in Sudbury by Henry Pleasant. Recently uncovered were a series of 13th and 14th century wall paintings.
