= Church of St Mary the Virgin, Layer Marney =

Church of St Mary the Virgin
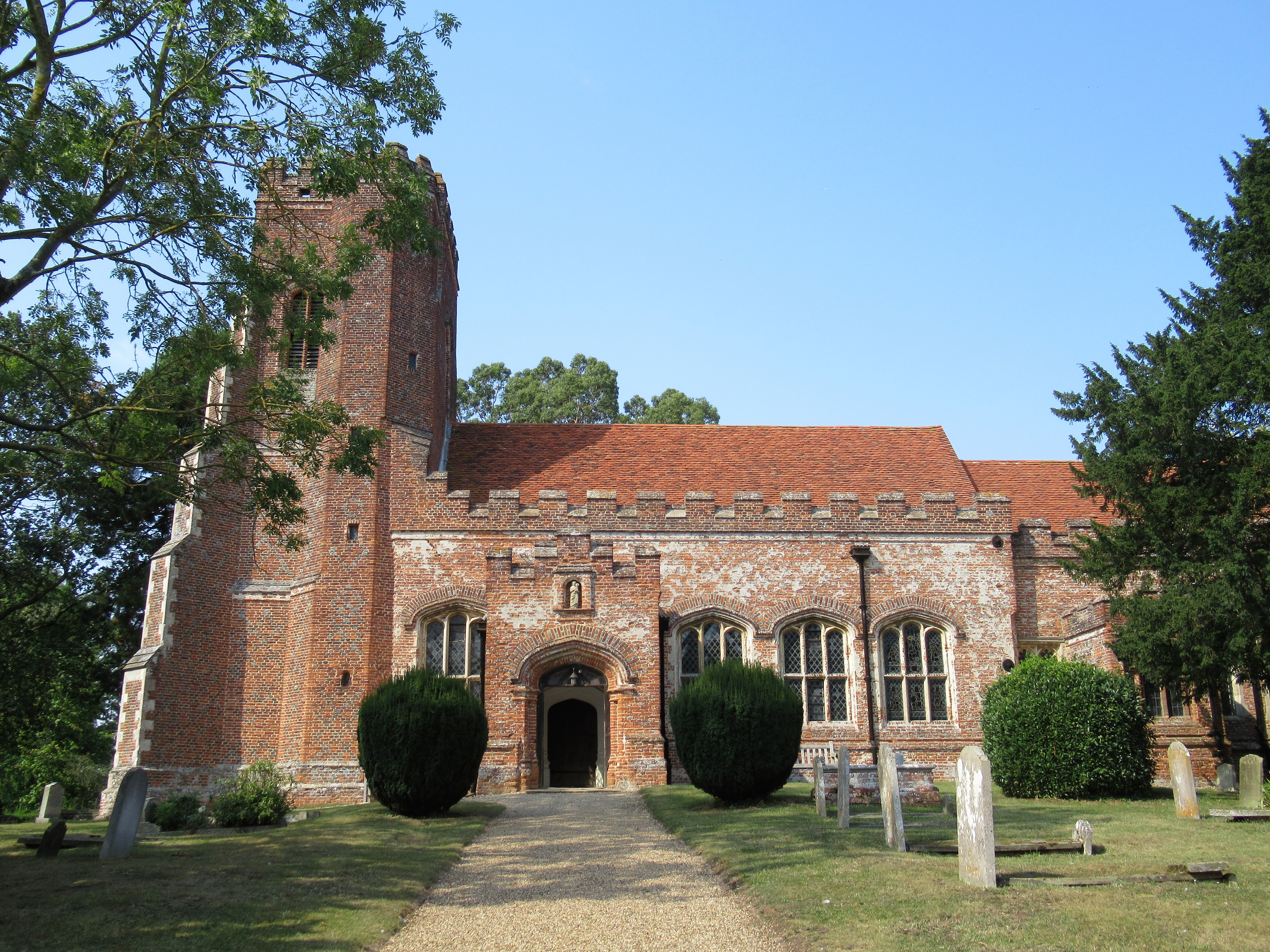
- Church of St Mary the Virgin
- 51°49′19.56″N 0°47′47.31″E
- OS grid reference: TL 92824 17418
- Location: Layer Marney, Essex
- Country: England
- Denomination: Church of England

Architecture
- Heritage designation: Grade I
- Designated: 7 April 1965

Administration
- Diocese: Diocese of Chelmsford

The Church of St Mary the Virgin is an Anglican church in the village of Layer Marney, in Essex, England, and in the Diocese of Chelmsford. The building dates from the early 16th century, and is Grade I listed.

== Description ==
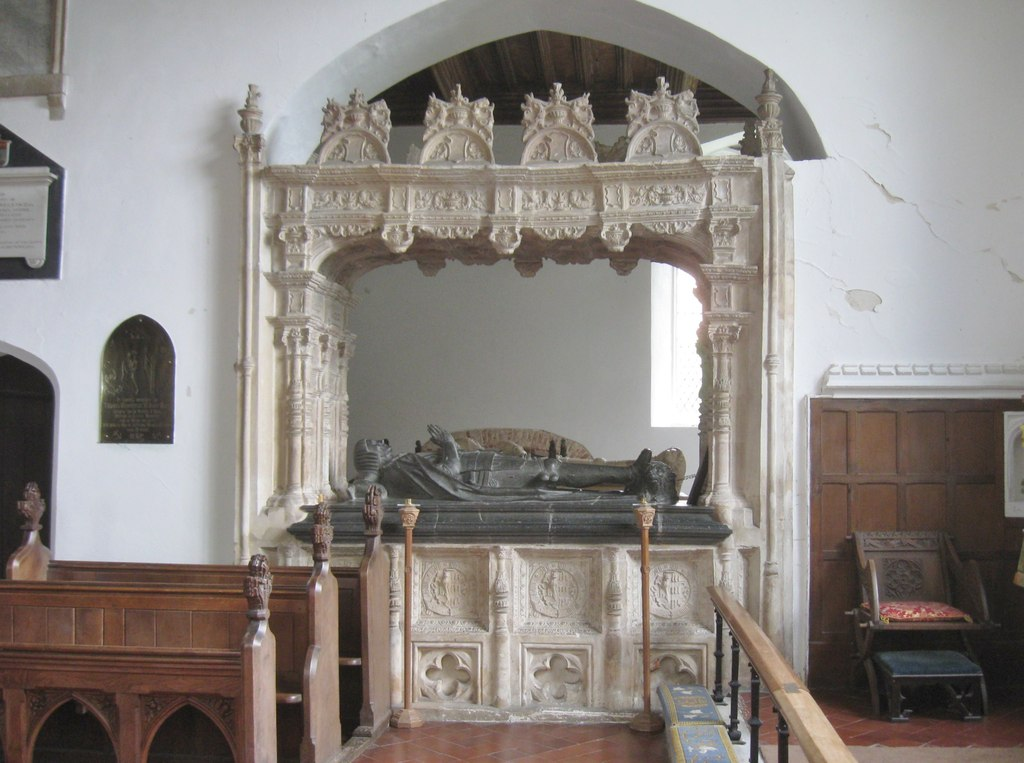
Monument to Henry Marney

There was an earlier church on the site; it was rebuilt in the early 16th century by Henry Marney, 1st Baron Marney and his son John, 2nd Baron Marney, who also built the adjacent Layer Marney Tower. The church and the tower were left unfinished on John's death in 1525, when the barony became extinct. Their wills made provision for the completion of the church.

There is a nave, chancel, north aisle and west tower. It is built of red brick, and there is diaper patterning, in blue brick, on the tower, which also has stone dressing on the diagonal buttresses.The church and tower have battlements. There are two south porches, giving entrance into the nave and the chancel.

Inside, there is a 15th-century rood screen. On the north wall of the nave is a mural dating from the early 16th century of Saint Christopher, bearing Christ and holding a ragged staff, uncovered in 1870.

There was restoration of the church in 1870 and 1911.

=== Monuments ===
There is a monument to Henry Marney, 1st Baron Marney (died 1523), showing a recumbent effigy in black marble under a terracotta canopy; and a monument to his son John (died 1525). There is also a monument to Sir William Marney, an alabaster effigy of the early 15th century, from the earlier church on the site.
