= Wimbledon =

Wimbledon most often refers to:

- Wimbledon, London, a district of southwest London
- Wimbledon Championships, the oldest tennis tournament in the world and one of the four Grand Slam championships

Wimbledon may also refer to:

== Places ==
=== London ===
- Wimbledon (ecclesiastical parish)
- Wimbledon (UK Parliament constituency)
- Municipal Borough of Wimbledon, a former borough
- Wimbledon Manor House, also called Wimbledon Palace, the home of the Lord of Wimbledon

=== Other places ===
- Wimbledon, New South Wales, Australia, see Georges Plains
- Wimbledon, New Zealand, a locality in the Tararua District of New Zealand
- Wimbledon, North Dakota, a small town in the United States

== People ==
- Lord Wimbledon, Edward Cecil, House of Commons member in the 1600s

== Sport ==
- Wimbledon RFC, an amateur rugby club
- Wimbledon F.C., a former football club (1889–2004)
- AFC Wimbledon, a professional football club
- AFC Wimbledon Women, a women's football club
- Wimbledon Dons, a former motorcycle speedway team
- Wimbledon Hockey Club, a field hockey club based in Wimbledon
- Wimbledon Stadium, a now-demolished dog and motor cycle racing track
- Imperial Meeting or Wimbledon Meeting, rifle shooting competition held on Wimbledon Common 1860-1889

== Other uses ==
- Wimbledon (film), a film set around the championships
- Wimbledon College, a Roman Catholic secondary school
- Wimbledon station, a major railway station, a tube station and a Tramlink stop in the suburb
- Edward Cecil, 1st Viscount Wimbledon (1572–1638)
- SS Wimbledon, a British ship, and
  - the S.S. Wimbledon case named for it, adjudicated by the Permanent Court of International Justice in 1923

== See also ==
- All England Lawn Tennis and Croquet Club, the venue for the tennis tournament
- Radio Wimbledon, the official radio station for the Wimbledon Tennis Championships
- South Wimbledon tube station, a London Underground station
- Wimbledon Chase railway station, a railway station
- Wimbledon Cup (disambiguation)
- Wimbledon Effect, the success of foreign financial firms in London
- Wimbledon Park tube station, a London Underground station
