= St Mary's Church, Chesham =

Church in Buckinghamshire, England

Coordinates: 51.704°N 0.617°W

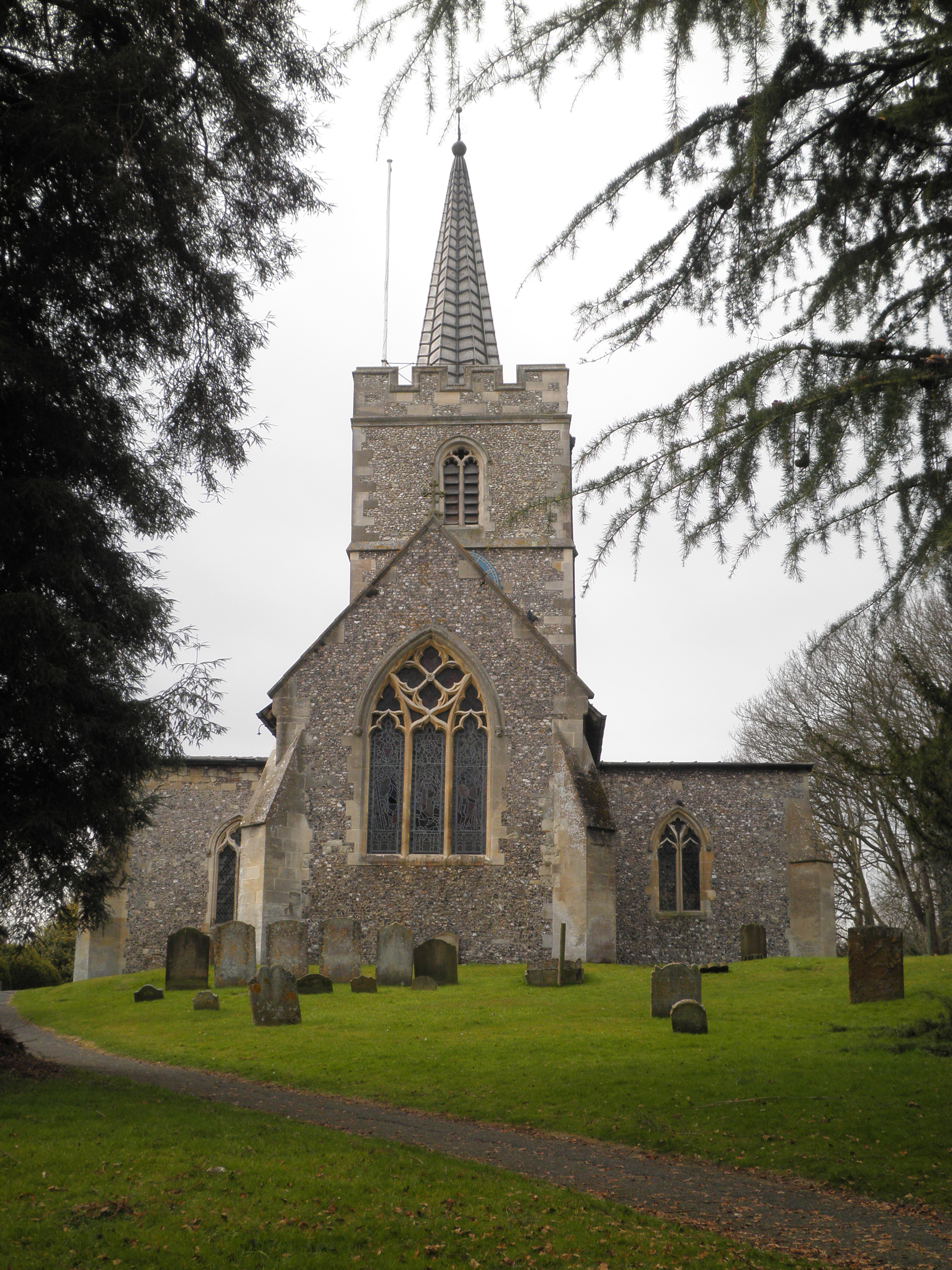
St. Mary's Church

St. Mary's Church is a Grade I listed Anglican church in Chesham, Buckinghamshire, and is part of the Diocese of Oxford. Built on the site of a Bronze Age stone circle of puddingstones, parts of the church building date to the 12th century. Remodelled in the 15th and 17th centuries, the church is architecturally a mixture of English Gothic styles. Weakened by additions to the church tower and undermined by burials in and around the church, by the 19th century the building was structurally unsound. The church was remodelled and strengthened in the 1860s by George Gilbert Scott and again in the 20th century by Robert Potter.

Formerly part of the Diocese of Lincoln, it served what was historically the largest parish in Buckinghamshire, and the church traditionally had two vicars. Initially the advowson (the right to appoint the vicar) was held jointly by a pair of prominent local families, but in the wake of the 12th century civil wars of the reign of King Stephen (1135–1154), the advowsons were granted to the monks of Woburn Abbey and to the Abbey of Saint Mary de Pratis in Leicester, each of whom appointed their own vicars to the parish. After the dissolution of the monasteries Woburn Abbey, together with its half of the advowson, was granted to the Earls of Bedford, while the half that had belonged to Leicester Abbey passed through a succession of private owners. In 1769 the Duke of Bedford acquired the Leicester half of the advowson and unified the parish, and from then on the parish was served by a single vicar.

The town of Chesham grew rapidly in the 19th century. After the parish was transferred to the Diocese of Oxford, reforms introduced by the Bishop of Oxford, Samuel Wilberforce, led to the parish being partitioned, eventually becoming four independent parishes (Chesham, Latimer, Waterside and Ashley Green). In 1980 it was decided to reverse this decision, and over the 1980s and 1990s three of these parishes (Chesham, Waterside and Ashley Green) were reunited under St. Mary's Church.

== Historical background ==
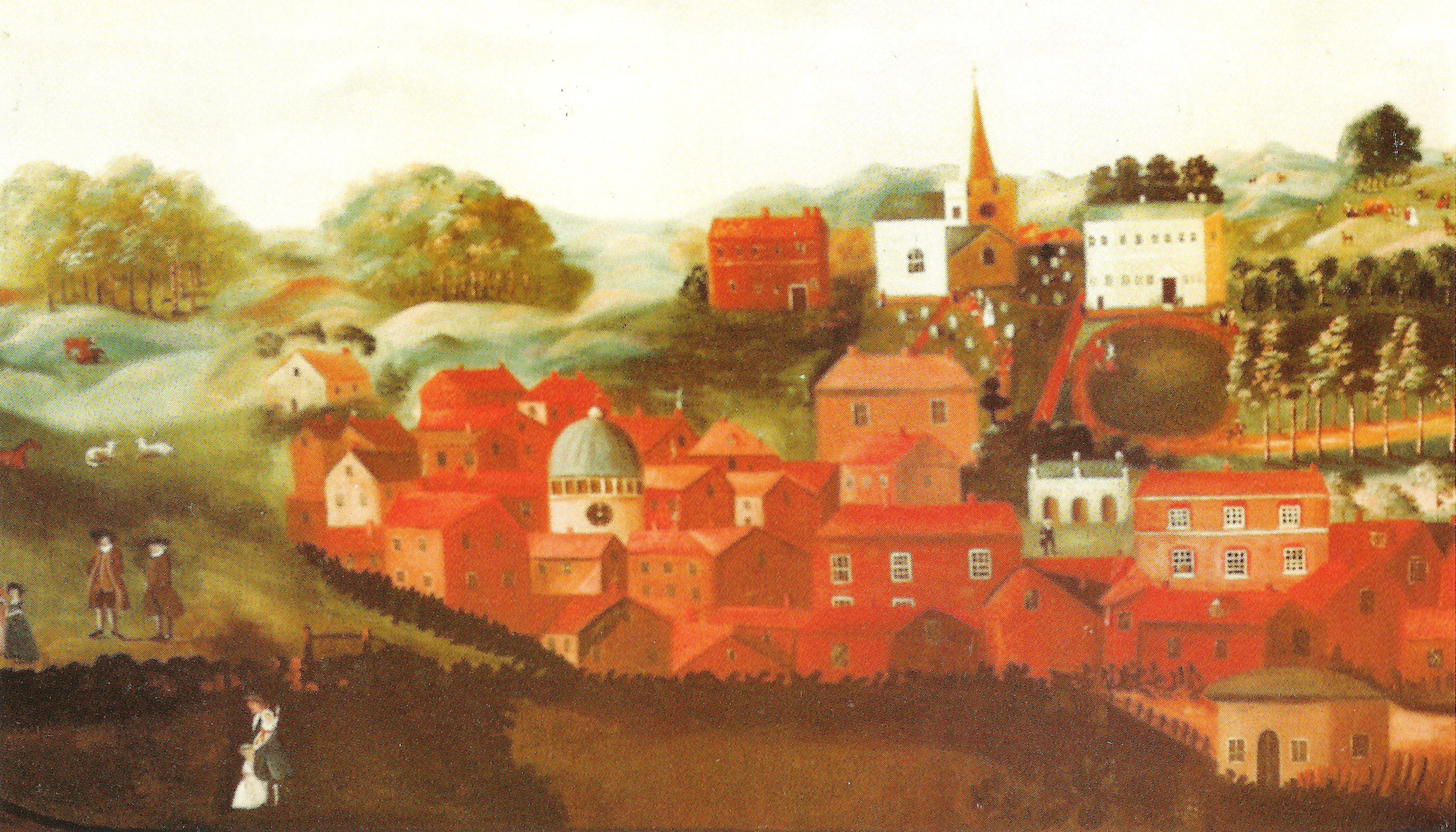
Chesham Old Town, circa 1750

Chesham is a Buckinghamshire town of around 20,000 people, located in the Chiltern Hills at the head of the River Chess, (Note: The town is not named after the River Chess; the river Isene was renamed the Chess in the 19th century as a back-formation from the name of the town. The name Isene (from Old English isærn, "iron") derived from the chalybeate springs around Chesham which feed the river. The alkalinity and high mineral content of the Chess make it an ideal environment for watercress; watercress cultivation was once a significant industry in the area and continues to be grown commercially at nearby Sarratt.) about 25 miles (40 km) north-west of London and 11 miles (18 km) south-east of Aylesbury.

There is archaeological evidence of human habitation during the Mesolithic period circa 8000 BC, of Neolithic farming circa 2500 BC and of Bronze Age settlement circa 1800 BC, during which time a stone circle of puddingstones was built at Chesham. The Catuvellauni tribe occupied and settled the area in around 500 BC, and at nearby Latimer there are remains of a Roman villa and archaeological evidence of Roman vineyards. Following the departure of the Romans the area appears to have been depopulated until Anglo-Saxon colonisation in the 7th century AD.

The first recorded mention of Chesham dates from 970 in the will of Lady Ælfgifu (identified with the former consort of King Eadwig of England), bequeathing Cæstæleshamme, "the water meadow at the pile of stones", (Note: Both the "water meadow" and the "pile of stones" survive today; the Anglo-Saxon water meadows face the current road also known as Water Meadow, while the stone circle – the "pile of stones" – forms part of the structure of the present day church.) to Abingdon Abbey. The Domesday Book of 1086 lists Cestreham as containing four mills and comprising three adjacent estates, the most important of which were held by Odo of Bayeux and Queen Edith, the widow of Edward the Confessor. (Note: The estate belonging to Odo at the time of Domesday had previously belonged to Leofwine Godwinson and was granted to Odo following the Conquest. The estate is today the village of Chesham Bois, a short distance south of Chesham itself.)

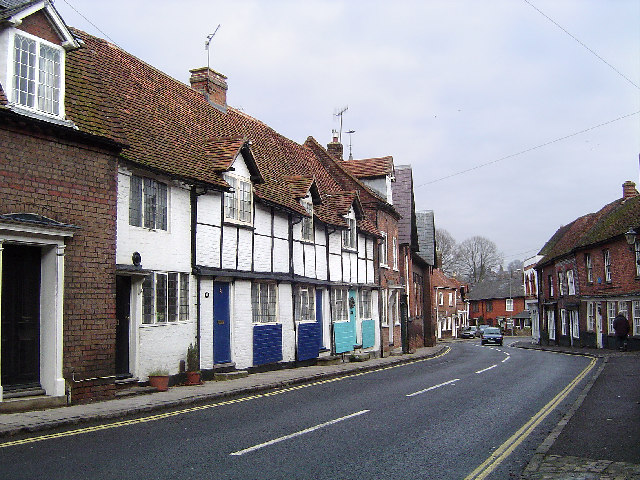
Church Street, Chesham Old Town

As with much of England, Chesham suffered serious religious unrest in the 16th and 17th centuries, and in 1532 Lollard radical Thomas Harding was burnt at the stake in the town for heresy. From the 17th century Chesham was a focus for dissenters. The first Baptist chapel in the town opened in 1701, Quakers have met in Chesham since the late 17th century, and John Wesley preached in Chesham in the 1760s.

Chesham Old Town, to the south-east of the present-day town centre, is the oldest part of the town and was the centre of Chesham until the late 19th century; in 1851 the population stood at 2,496. In 1889 the Metropolitan Railway reached the area as the first phase of a planned extension from Rickmansworth to Berkhamsted, and Chesham railway station was opened to the north-east of the Old Town. Following the Metropolitan Railway's acquisition of the Aylesbury and Buckingham Railway (A&B) in 1891, the extension to Berkhamsted was abandoned in favour of a connection between the Metropolitan Railway's station at Chalfont Road (now Chalfont & Latimer) to Aylesbury and over the A&B's route to Verney Junction, and Chesham station was left as the terminus of and sole station on a 3.89-mile (6.26 km) branch from the mainline, a status it retains today. (Note: In 1933 the Metropolitan Railway was taken into the ownership of the newly created London Passenger Transport Board and became the Metropolitan line of the London Underground. In 1961 Metropolitan line services beyond Amersham were withdrawn due to the high cost of electrification. Despite its distance from London, Chesham station remains operated by London Underground and as of 2010 is the most distant tube station from central London.)

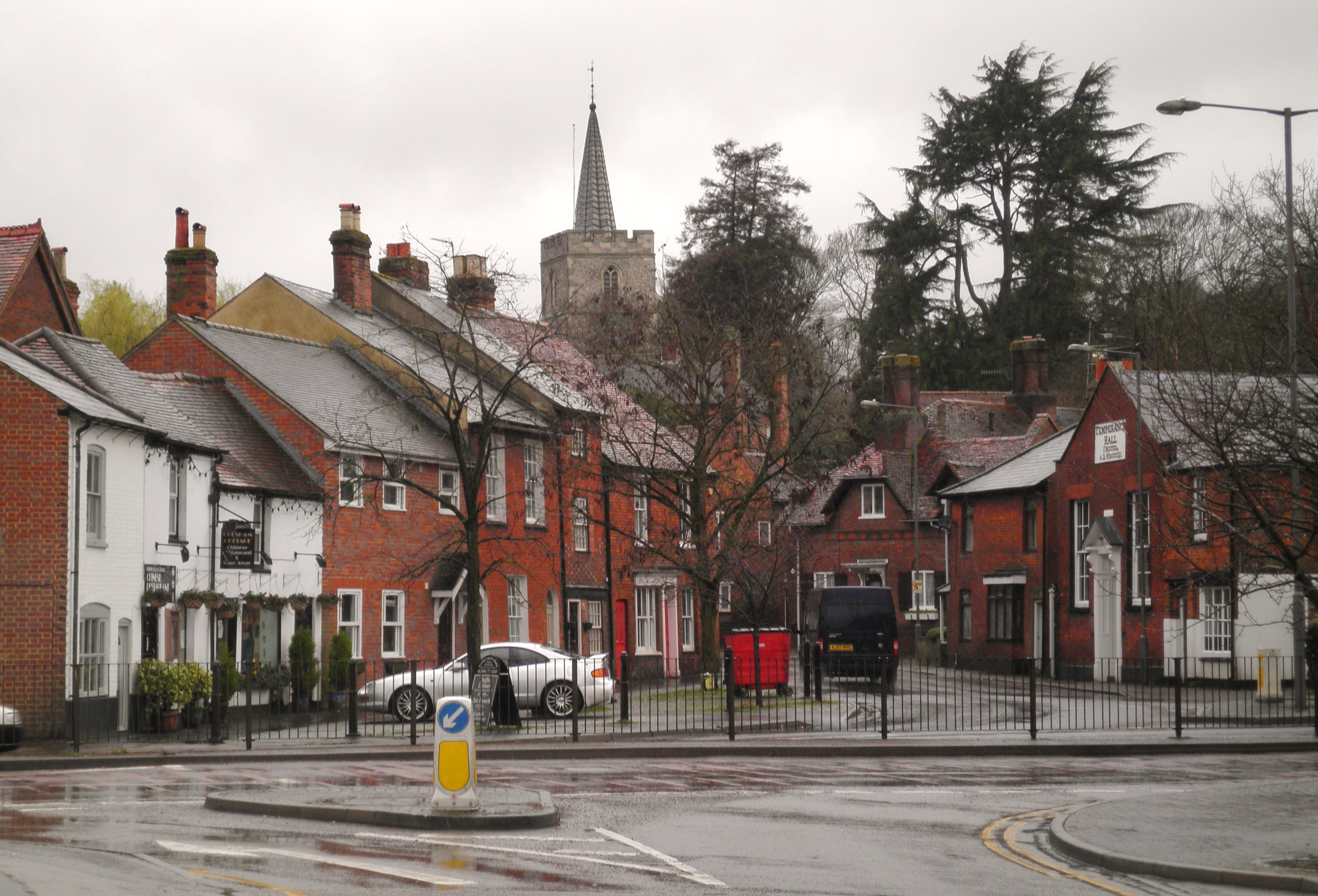
Chesham Old Town, 2010

The new town of present-day Chesham grew between the railway station and the Old Town, leaving the architecture of the Old Town almost untouched. In June 2009 the Old Town and the present-day town centre were added to Historic England's Conservation Areas at Risk Register, although the local authority claimed that this was owing to a misunderstanding of its responses to English Heritage's questionnaire.

== Architecture ==
The existence of the stone circle indicates that a pagan place of worship existed in the area since prehistory, and although no archaeological evidence exists of any pre-Conquest structure on the site of the present-day St. Mary's Church other than the stone circle itself, it is considered likely that a wooden church was built on the site by the Anglo-Saxons. The earliest evidence of there being a church in Chesham is in the registers of the Diocese of Lincoln, whose 1153 registers mention "the church in Chesham". (Note: During the Anglo-Saxon period the Chilterns were part of the Diocese of Dorchester with its seat at Dorchester on Thames, in the wake of the Norman Conquest, the Diocese of Dorchester became the Diocese of Lincoln under Remigius de Fécamp. Chesham, along with the rest of Buckinghamshire, was transferred to the Diocese of Oxford in 1845.) In 1257 Hugh de Vere was granted the right to hold an annual three-day fair and a weekly market in Chesham by Henry III. (Note: Aubrey de Vere (fl. 1066–1112) was a Norman noble who came to England with William the Conqueror; the de Vere family rapidly rose to prominence. From 1100 to 1703 the family held the title of Earl of Oxford, and from 1133 to 1626 the hereditary office of Lord Great Chamberlain. Aubrey de Vere's great-grandson Aubrey de Vere, 2nd Earl of Oxford (c. 1165 – 1214) had married Isabel de Bolebec (1175 – c. 1206), the daughter of Walter de Bolebec, and thus acquired the de Bolebec lands in Buckinghamshire, including Chesham.) The annual fair was to be held on "the eve, the day and the morrow of the Feast of the Assumption of the Blessed Virgin Mary", strongly suggesting that Chesham's church was already dedicated to Mary.

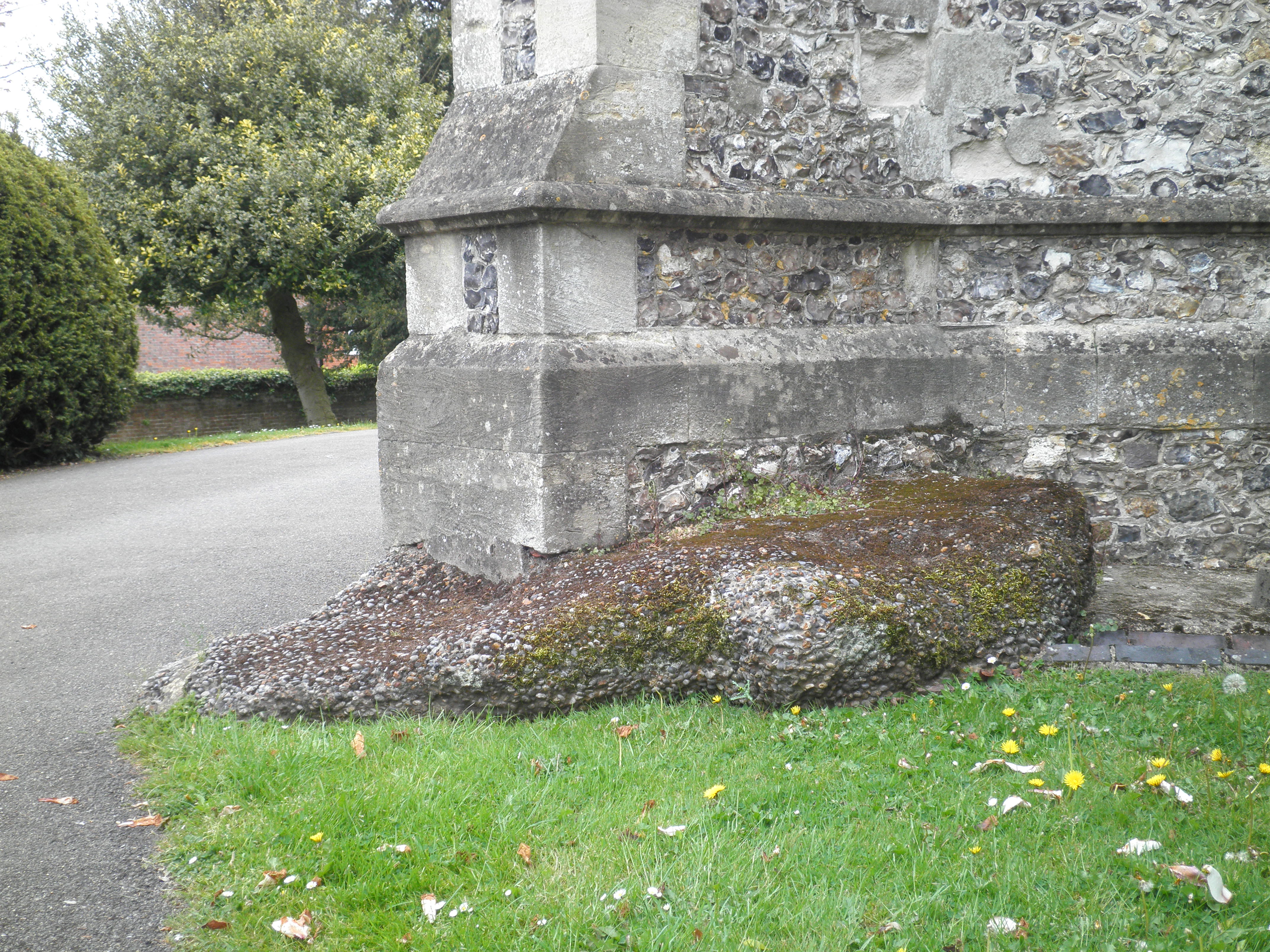
The Bronze Age stone circle was incorporated into the foundations of the current church building.

The church is built on the Bronze Age puddingstone circle, which has been incorporated into the foundations of the church. Built of knapped flint with limestone dressings, it has a roughly cruciform shape. The present day church building comprises a chancel, a clerestoried nave, north and south aisles and transepts and a south porch with a tierceron vault. The church is topped by a square central crenellated steeple with an octagonal wooden spire covered with lead. Although the current stone church of St. Mary's contains a mixture of architectural styles, mainly Gothic and dating from later periods, a Romanesque window between the north transept and north aisle has been dated to the 12th century, indicating that the church was already a stone building by this time.

The building as a whole is 114 feet (35 m) long from east to west and 53 feet (16 m) wide from north to south. The nave (excluding the aisles) is 64 feet 6 inches (19.66 m) long and 22 feet (6.7 m) wide; English Gothic aisles and the arcades of the nave were added early in the 13th century. The arcades consist of five bays with octagonal piers and arches with half-pyramid shaped springers, a design described by Nikolaus Pevsner in 1960 as "baffling". In 1270 the eastern arch of the tower was widened, and in around 1320 the other arches of the tower were also widened. In about 1370 the chancel was rebuilt in the Decorated Gothic style, and a doorway added in the south aisle at around the same time.

=== 15th- and 17th-century renovation ===
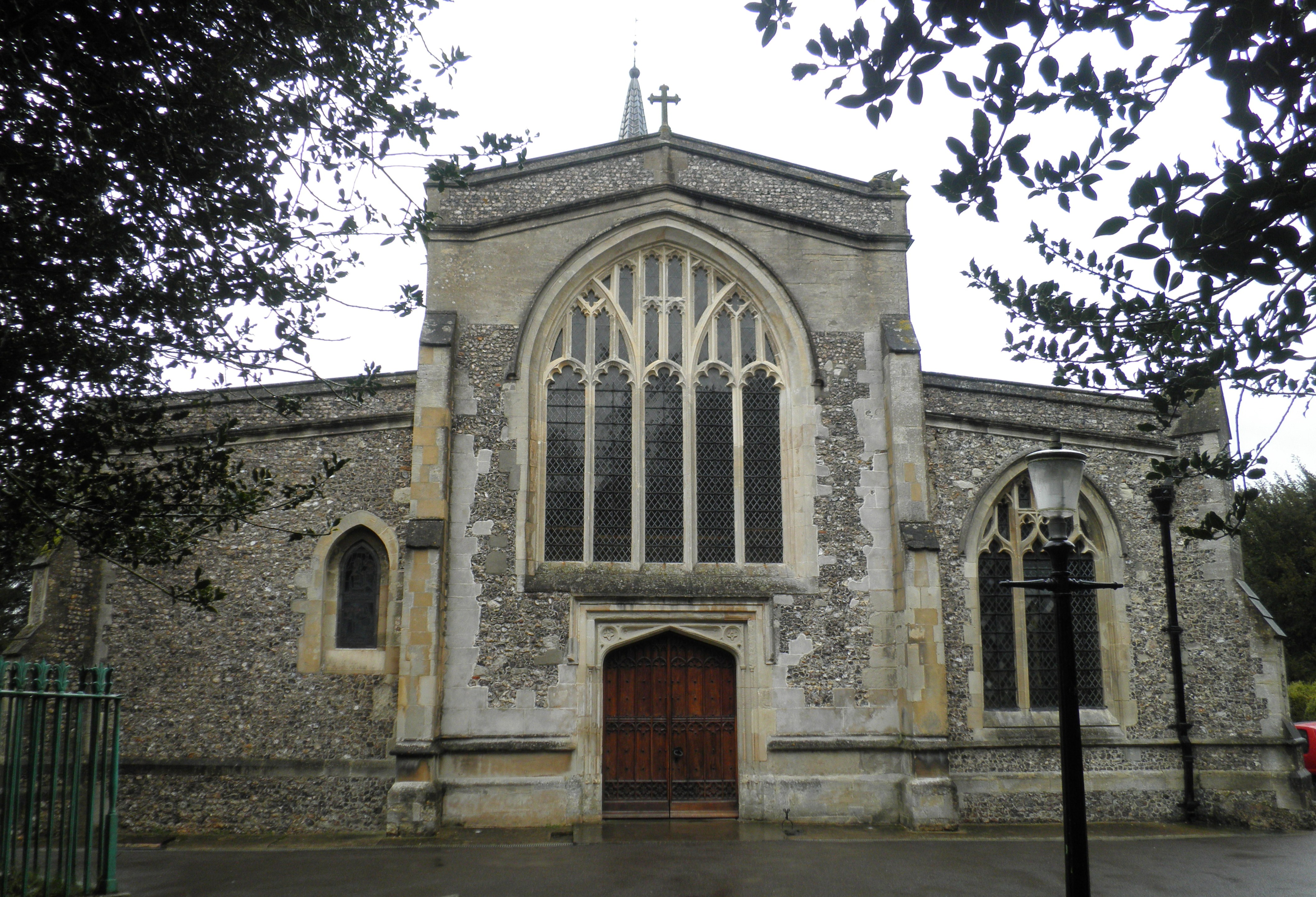
The western end of the nave, with its 15th-century Perpendicular great window and door

In the 15th century the clerestory was added to the nave, along with the Perpendicular two-storied south porch; these reconstruction works necessitated the repositioning of the door on the south aisle, and the building of the present-day western wall of the nave, with a great window and door also in the Perpendicular style. Stained glass windows were installed in the clerestory, but their contents were not recorded, and only small fragments of the mediaeval glass survive today: the arms of the Cheyne family, (Note: The Cheyne family descended from Thomas Cheyne, shield bearer to Edward III. Living in nearby Chenies, to which they gave the name, they were one of the most prominent families in mediaeval Chesham.) a human figure, and a shield with fragments of coloured glass, possibly the impaled arms of Woburn and Leicester. A staircase in the porch led to a parvise above; local tradition holds that Thomas Harding was held in the parvise prior to his execution in 1532. The porch also contains a stoup dating from the late 14th century, which although much damaged has survived all subsequent restorations and remodellings unaltered.

While the stone tower was completed in the 15th century, the date of the spire is unknown and has been dated to periods ranging from the 16th to 18th centuries. The church is known to have possessed a ring of bells by the 16th century, as the 1552 inventory of church possessions carried out on the instructions of Edward VI lists "v bells in the stepill". A bell cast in around 1450 by John Sturdy is still used as a Sanctus bell and is regarded as having national historic significance.

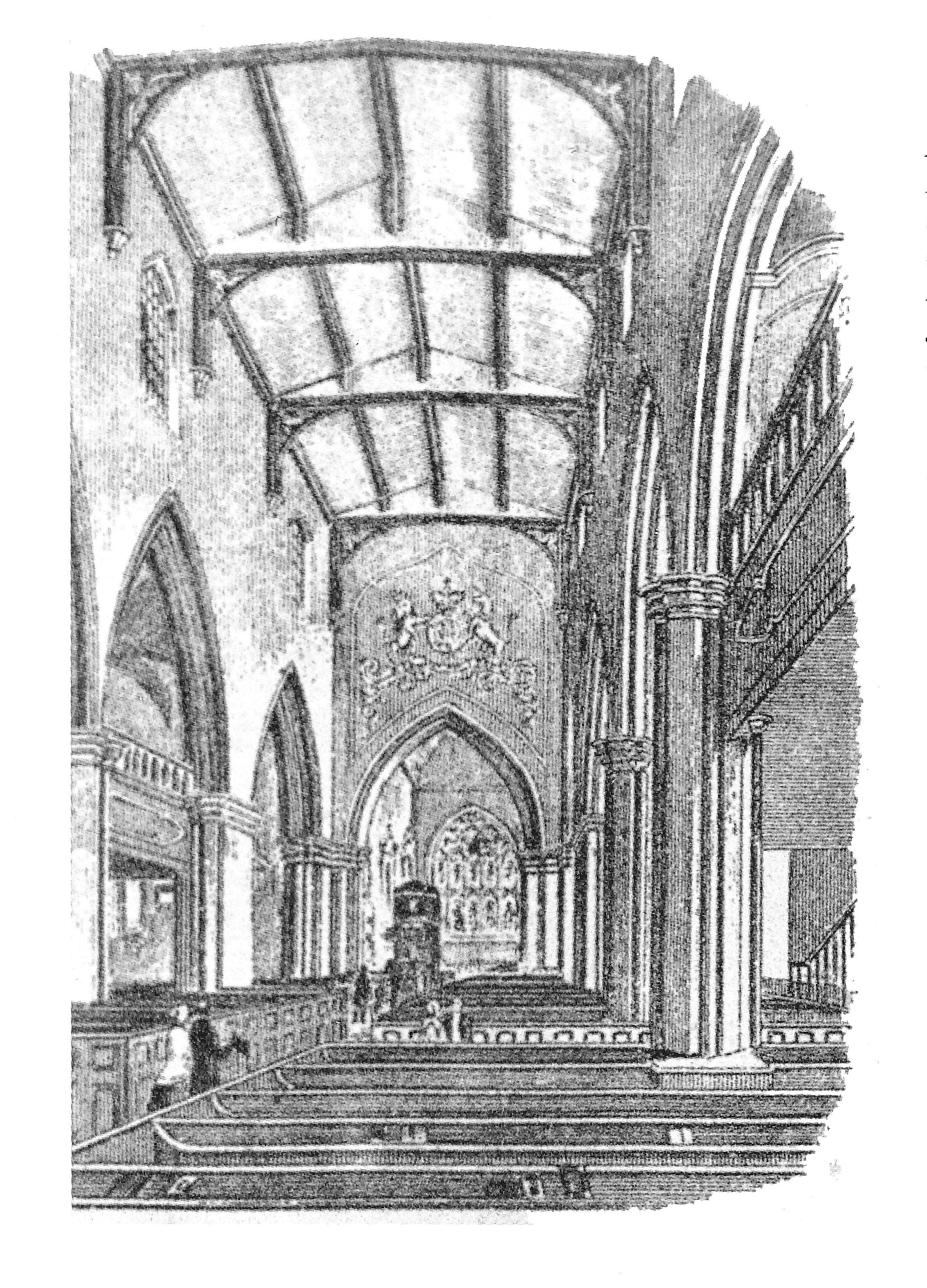
The interior of St. Mary's following the addition of the three galleries

In the chaotic climate of religious upheaval during and following the Reformation of the 16th century many of England's churches fell into disrepair, including St. Mary's; the great door of St. Mary's was damaged during the Civil War and bullet holes from the conflict remain visible today. In 1606 it was decided to renovate St. Mary's. Two of the bells were re-cast, the pews were replaced, and "a fair new gallery" was built along the south aisle. In the 18th century two further galleries were added to the church; a north gallery reserved for the exclusive use of "maids and maidservants", and a west gallery for the use of St. Mary's band of musicians and choristers, later used to house the church's organ. The wooden communion table was sold for 3s and a new table added at a cost of 10s 6d (about £143 as of 2025). (Note: The 1606 communion table remained in use until 1914, when it was moved to the south transept. In the 1980s it was brought back into use as a communion table, but following Potter's 1999 remodelling of the interior a new communion table was installed and the 1606 table returned to the south transept.)

=== 19th-century renovation ===
Since the widening of the tower arches in 1270 and 1320 the tower of St. Mary's had been structurally weak. The subsequent addition of the bells and belfry and the lead-covered spire added to the weight of the tower, and the number of burials of local notables within the church and of parishioners immediately outside the church building weakened the structure further. By the 18th century the problems had become severe enough that the west arch of the south transept was blocked up in an effort the strengthen the structure, and a hollow pillar which housed the stairway to the rood loft was filled in. The tower continued to weaken, a situation made worse by the addition in 1812 of a new ring of six bells with a 17 cwt (860 kg) tenor bell, cast by Thomas Mears II of the Whitechapel Bell Foundry. Iron bands were wrapped around the tower to strengthen it but these soon snapped, and by the 19th century large cracks, which had appeared in the tower, were filled with broken bricks and rubble and covered over with roughcast as an interim solution.

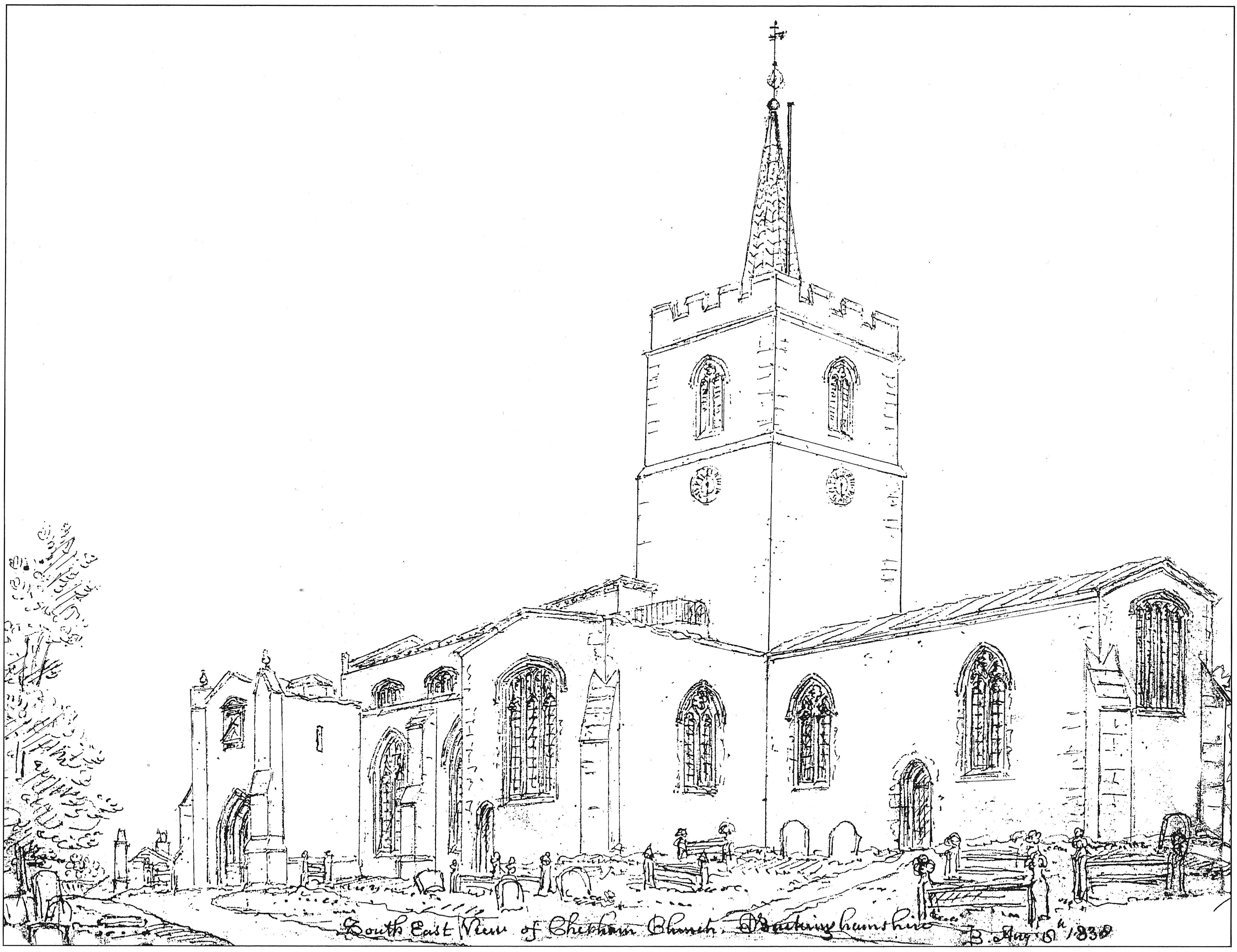
St. Mary's Chesham, 1838, prior to Scott's 19th-century reconstruction

By 1867, church authorities deemed the problems with the tower as severe enough to warrant a major reconstruction of the church. George Gilbert Scott, who had recently designed the monumental London buildings of the Foreign Office and St. Pancras Station, was chosen to lead the project. Scott was a leading advocate of the Gothic Revival and saw the renovation as a chance to return St. Mary's to a state nearer to its earlier Gothic design.

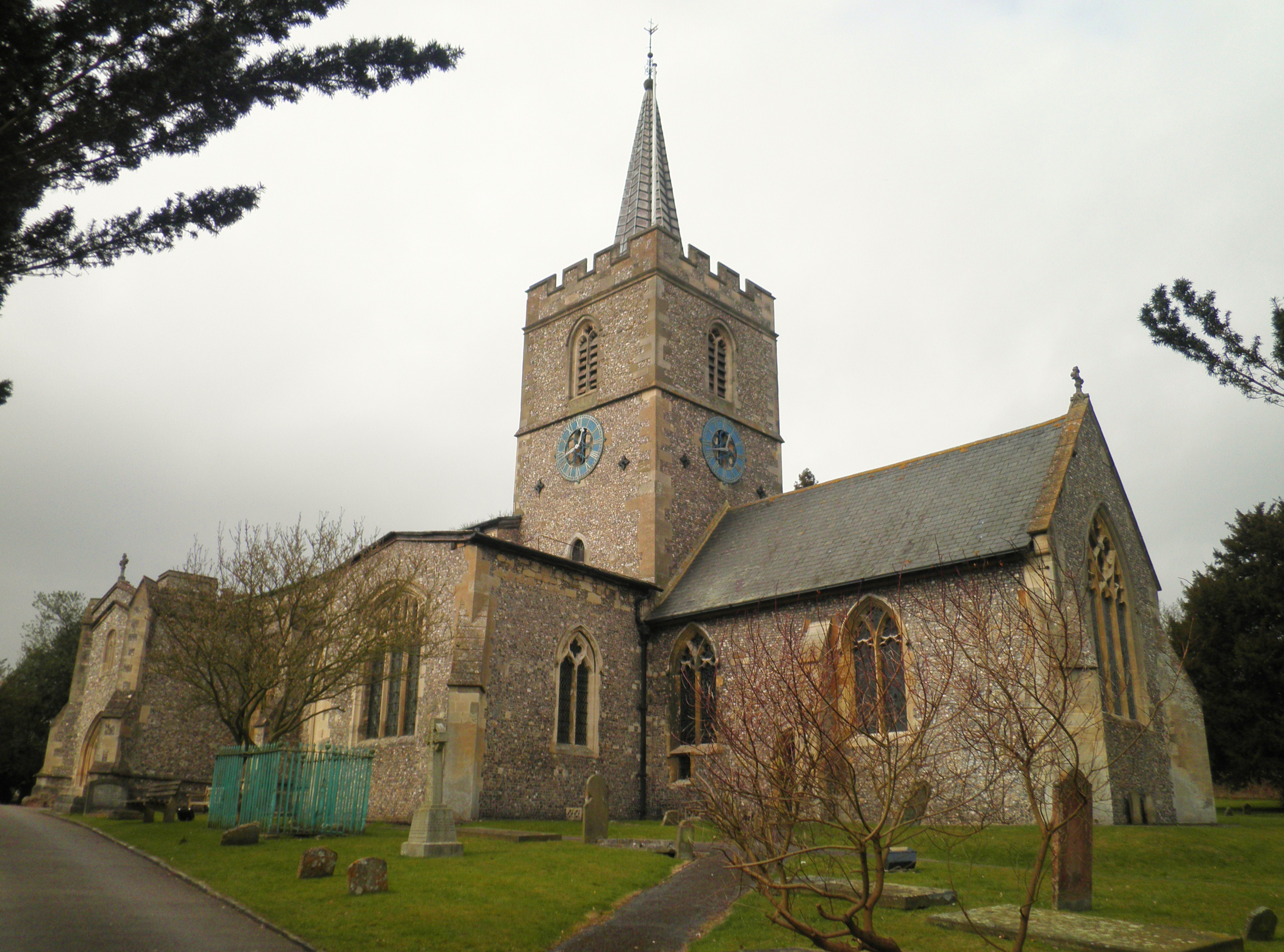
St. Mary's as it appears following Scott's remodelling of the exterior

Scott removed the galleries, the high-sided 1606 pews, (Note: High-sided pews were heavily criticised by the influential Oxford Movement in the 19th century as being "made high and easy for the parishioners to sleep in". As a part of the Diocese of Oxford, the influence of the Oxford Movement was particularly strong in Chesham.) and the three-tiered pulpit. The tower was strengthened, the building's exterior facing of flint and limestone was restored, and the chancel, which had been remodelled in the late 17th century, was restored to its original shape and given a new east window in the Decorated Gothic style, containing Ward and Hughes glass depicting Faith, Hope and Charity, donated by the Duke of Bedford. New wooden pews were installed together with a Gothic style pulpit, and a font of Mansfield Woodhouse stone donated by the Lowndes family.

The north transept, which had previously served as a vestry from which the Poor Law was administered, was used to house the church's William Hill & Son organ, which had been installed in 1852 in the now-removed western gallery; the south transept, which up to that date had been used as a mausoleum for the Cavendish family and was completely walled off from the rest of the church and accessible only via its own door from the churchyard, was opened up to the church. In 1890 Cambridge Chimes were added to the tower clock, in commemoration of the Diamond Jubilee of Queen Victoria.

=== 20th-century renovation ===
Scott's alterations proved successful in stabilising the tower and in serving the needs of the church, and the church remained little changed for the next 130 years; the most notable alterations during this period were the replacement of the glass in the chancel's two leper windows with stained glass images of Pre-Raphaelite knights by Edward Burne-Jones as a memorial to a young officer killed during the Boer War, (Note: The original purpose of these two windows is not certain; it is thought that they were originally leper windows or offertory windows. They were formerly shuttered, but the shutters have now been removed. The date of the windows is unknown.) and the painting of a mural over the chancel arch by John Ward depicting the events of Holy Week in modern dress and set in the Chilterns. In 1951 the church was Grade A listed.

In 1980 the fourth bell of the ring of six was recast, again by the Whitechapel Foundry. By the 1990s the internal design of the church was beginning to be considered impractical for the needs of the community, and the interior was remodelled to a design by Robert Potter, with the works carried out in 1999. The west gallery was restored to house the 1852 organ, together with a kitchen and toilet facility, and the north transept was converted into a vestry with a room above it. Underfloor heating was built below a new marble floor and the chancel step replaced by an ovoid raised marble dais. Meanwhile, Scott's pews were removed altogether and replaced by wooden chairs.

== Ecclesiastical organisation ==
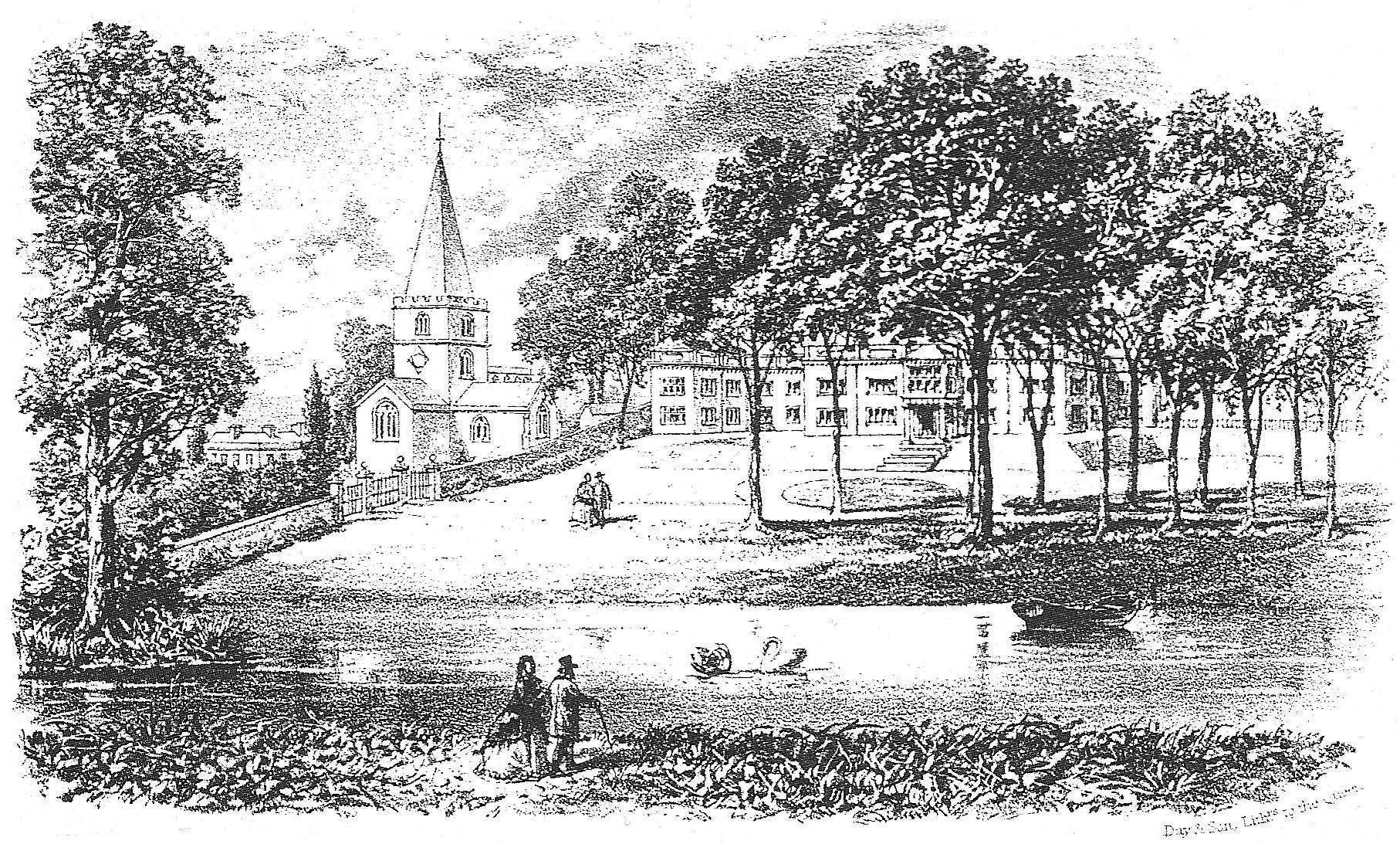
St. Mary's Church and the Upper Parsonage, attached to the Leicester half of the church

In the 12th and early 13th centuries the advowson (the right to appoint the vicar) of the church was held jointly by two local landowning families, the de Bolbec (or de Bolebec) and Sifrewast families; as a very large parish (generally considered to have been the largest parish in Buckinghamshire) twin administrations suited the needs of the parish. Following the civil wars of the reign of King Stephen (1135–1154) England underwent a major upsurge in religious activity and saw a significant growth of monasteries. At some point prior to 1221 the de Bolbec family had included their half of the advowson in a grant to the Cistercians of Woburn Abbey, and the Sifrewasts had granted their half to the Augustinian Abbey of Saint Mary de Pratis in Leicester. (Note: Dunstable Priory claimed that Woburn Abbey had in turn granted the de Bolbec half of the advowson to the Priory, while Robert de Vere, heir to the de Bolbec lands via his wife Isabel de Bolebec (1165 – 3 February 1245, aunt of the Isabel de Bolebec married to Robert's brother Aubrey de Vere), claimed that the grant of the advowson was invalid and demanded that it be returned to the family. The three-way legal case was settled in 1221 in favour of Woburn Abbey.) From then on, Woburn and Leicester were to share the patronage, each appointing their own vicars to the parish, known as Chesham Woburn and Chesham Leicester.

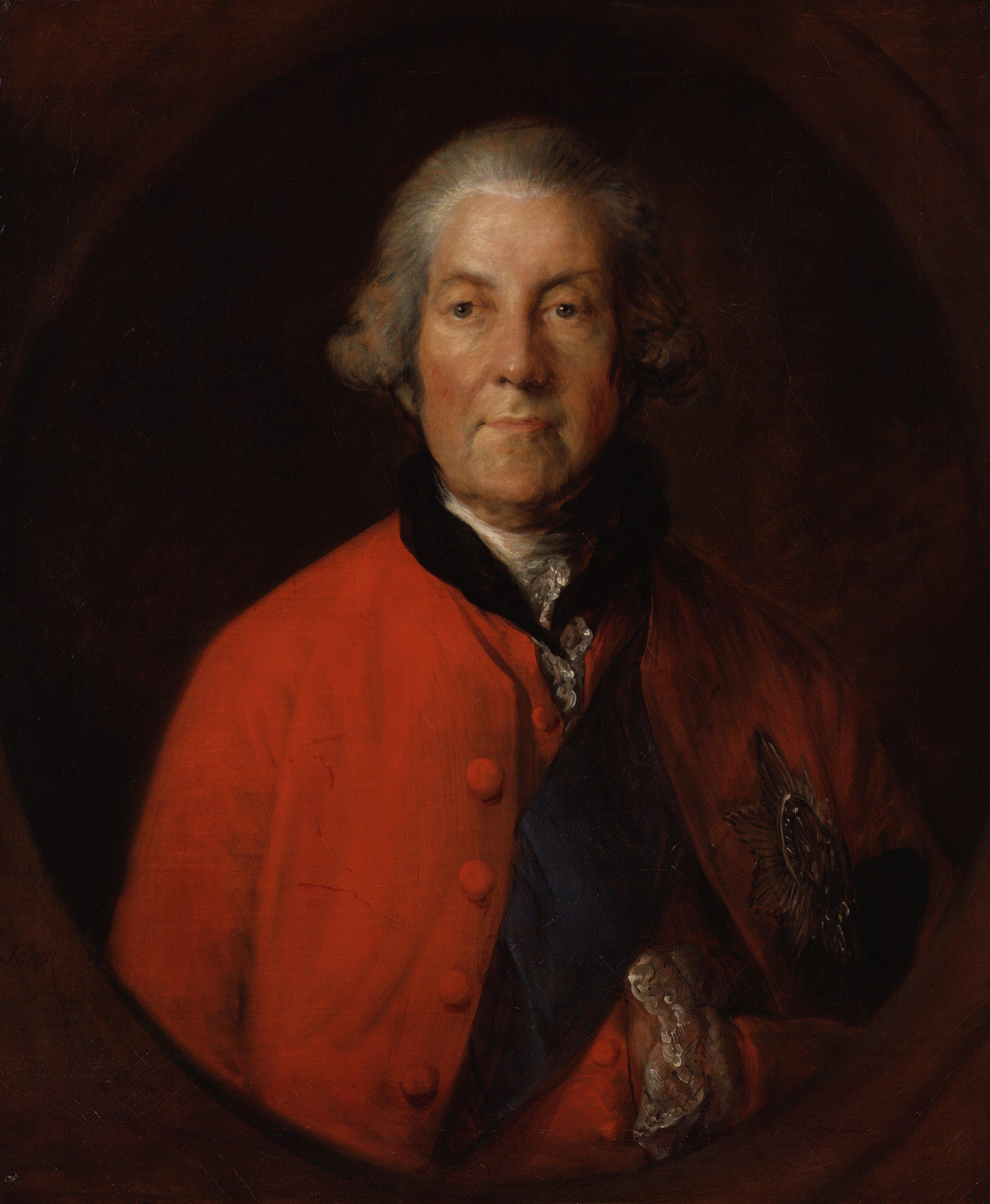
John Russell, 4th Duke of Bedford, unified the parish.

Following the Dissolution of the Monasteries in the 16th century the advowson of Chesham Woburn remained attached to Woburn Abbey and was transferred, along with the abbey building, to John Russell, 1st Earl of Bedford. The advowson of Chesham Leicester was sold, and from then on had a succession of owners, eventually coming into the ownership of prominent local landowners the Skottowe family, who purchased it from Sir Francis Whichcote, MP for Cambridgeshire. From 1601 onwards, other than a brief period between 1623 and 1660, the appointees of Chesham Woburn and Chesham Leicester were the same person, and thus the parish was served by a single vicar, although he continued to be appointed by the holders of each advowson separately. In 1769 John Russell, 4th Duke of Bedford, who had inherited Chesham Woburn, also acquired Chesham Leicester and from then on the parish was served by a single vicar assisted by multiple curates; in 1767 the two halves of the parish were formally unified by an Act of Parliament.

In 1845 Chesham, along with the rest of Buckinghamshire, was transferred from the Diocese of Lincoln, of which for historical reasons it had been a part since the Norman Conquest despite its distance from Lincoln, to the Diocese of Oxford. It thus came under the control of Oxford's newly appointed dynamic young bishop Samuel Wilberforce, who in turn appointed Adolphus Aylward as vicar in 1847 to oversee the reform of the parish. A second church at Waterside was opened in 1867, and the huge parish of Chesham was partitioned between St. Mary's and the new Christ Church, Waterside. As Chesham and the surrounding towns grew following the arrival of the Metropolitan Railway the parish was divided further, leaving a total of four independent parishes: St. Mary's, Christ Church Waterside, St. John the Evangelist Ashley Green, and Latimer At the end of the 19th century the advowson of the much-reduced parish of St. Mary's was acquired by the recently created Peache Trust.

In 1980 it was decided to reverse the partition of the parish. Over the course of the 1980s and early 1990s three of the four parishes were reunified into a single parish of Great Chesham, administered by a single Rector, also the Vicar of St. Mary's, and a team of clergy serving five of the other churches; the sixth, St. Michael's Whelpley Hill, was closed.

== Associated buildings and structures ==
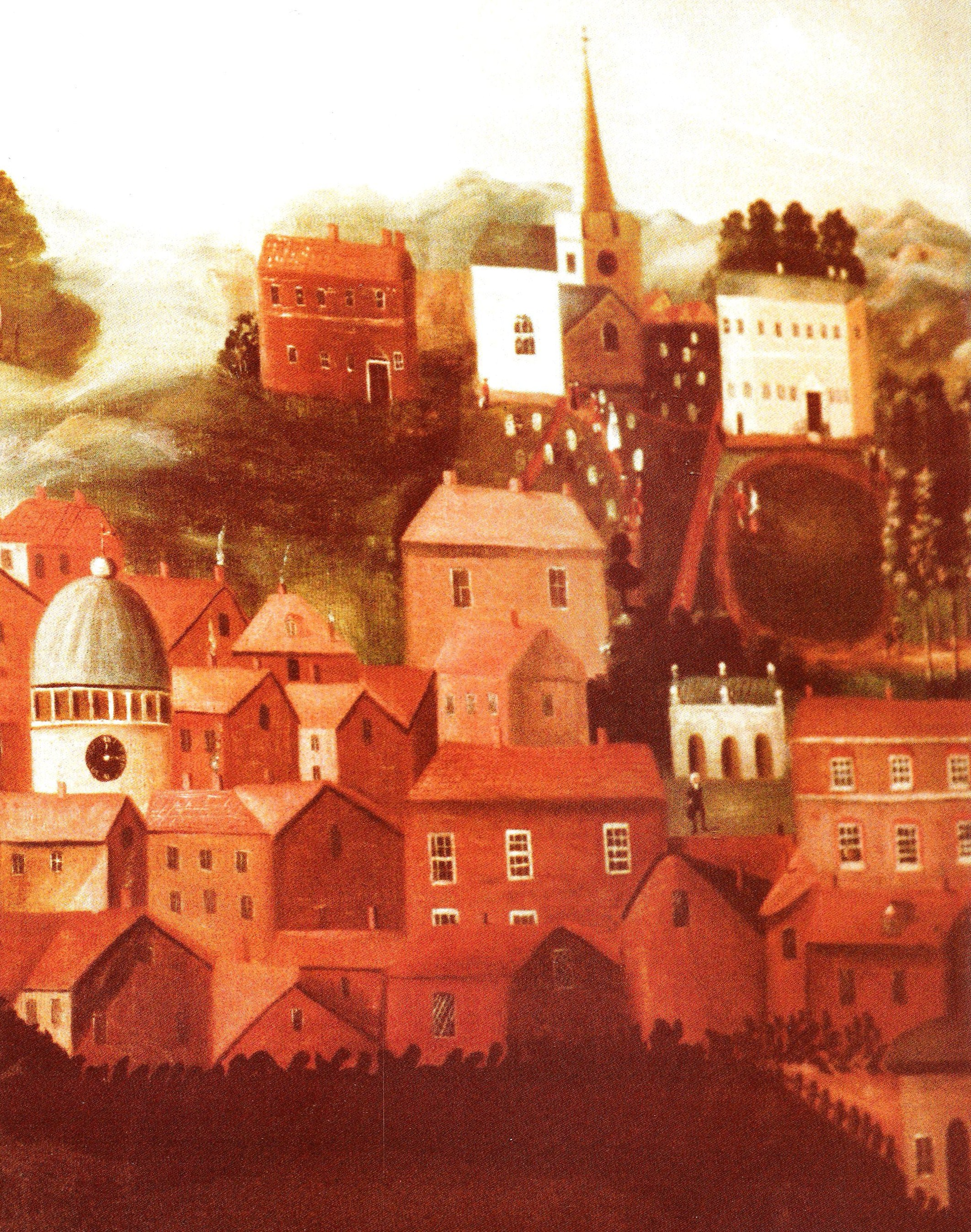
The red Bury and white Upper Parsonage flank St. Mary's, behind the Lower Parsonage, c. 1750

In 1712 Secretary to the Treasury William Lowndes rebuilt Chesham's manor house, The Bury, immediately to the south of the church. The building still stands today, and currently serves as an office building.

Owing to its unusual advowson, Chesham historically had two vicarages. The Upper Parsonage, also known as Bury Hill House, was built in the 16th century and attached to Chesham Leicester, and was used as a residence by the Skottowe family following their acquisition of Chesham Leicester; it was a large mansion house immediately north of St. Mary's Church. In the early 19th century the house was bought and demolished by the Lowndes family.

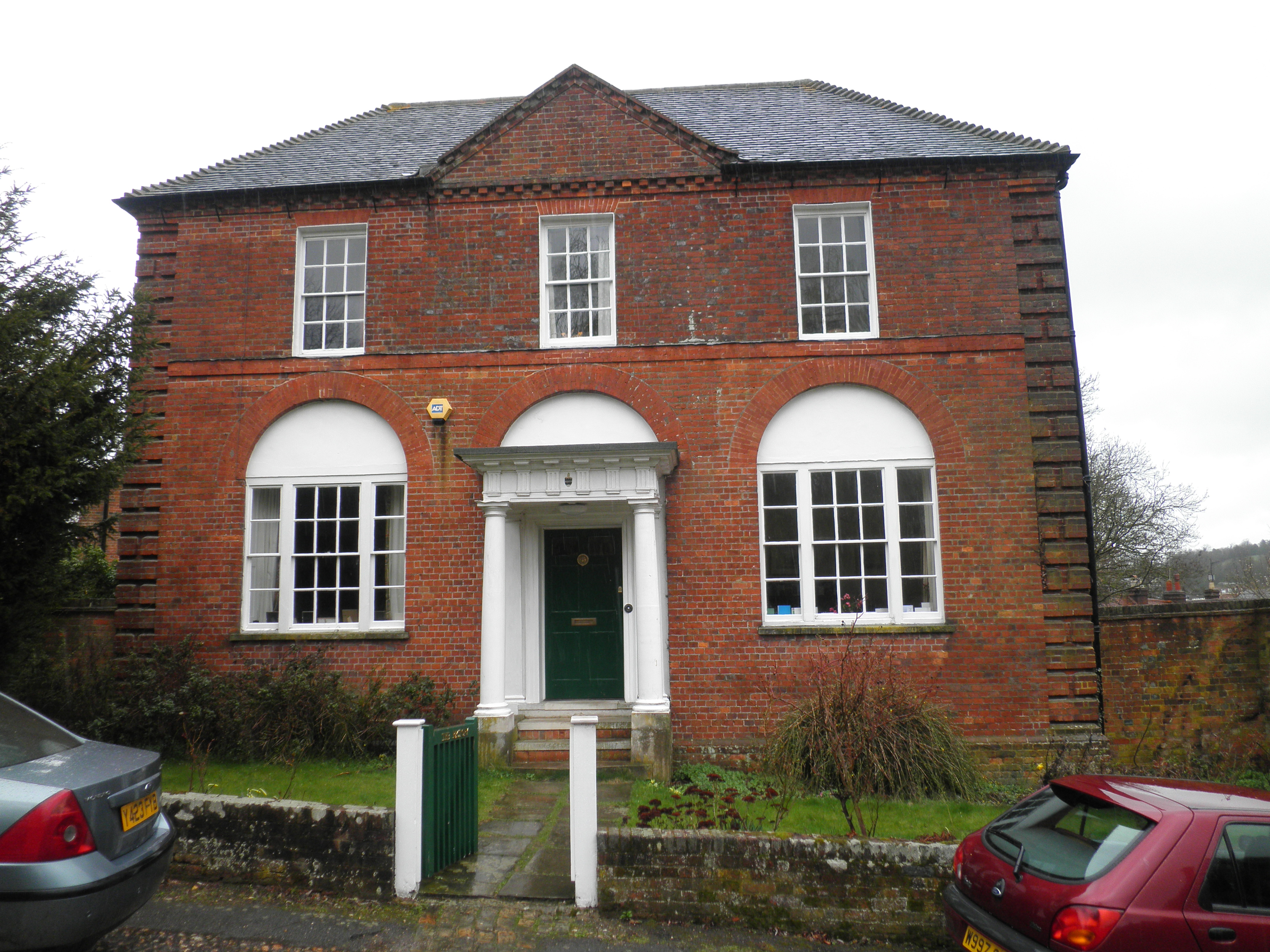
Chesham Rectory

The Lower Parsonage, attached to Chesham Woburn, stood immediately east of the church, between the church and the Old Town. It was demolished in around 1769 by John Russell, 4th Duke of Bedford, and replaced by a new vicarage for the vicar of the newly unified parish. This vicarage remains attached to the parish, and since the re-amalgamation of the Chesham parishes in the 1980s and 1990s is known as the Rectory.

=== Organ ===
In 1504 the will of Robert Wedon bequeathed funds for a chaplain, provided that he could "organise" and "sing well". No other reference to an organ at St. Mary's exists until the installation of the William Hill & Son organ in 1852 in the west gallery. In 1869 the organ was moved to the north transept during Scott's renovation of the church, and at this time its volume and power were increased. In Potter's 1999 remodelling of the church the pipes of the organ were moved to the new west gallery and electronically enhanced, and the console installed at the eastern end of the north aisle.

=== Notable graves and memorials ===
The south transept had historically served as the mausoleum for the Cavendish family, who resided at nearby Latimer. During Scott's renovations of the 1860s the transept was opened up to the church and remodelled, and only one Cavendish tomb survives today, that of John Cavendish, son of William Cavendish, 1st Earl of Devonshire, who had died in 1617 aged 11. Sculpted by John Bolt the Elder of London, the tomb features ornately carved strapwork above a sarcophagus, flanked by black coupled columns supporting small obelisks, and topped by a double-curved roof. The south transept also holds the 1726 pyramid-shaped tomb of Lady Mary Whichcote, wife of Sir Francis Whichcote who at that time owned Chesham Leicester; Mary Whichcote's elaborate funeral bankrupted Sir Francis, leading to his sale of Chesham Leicester to the Skottowe family.

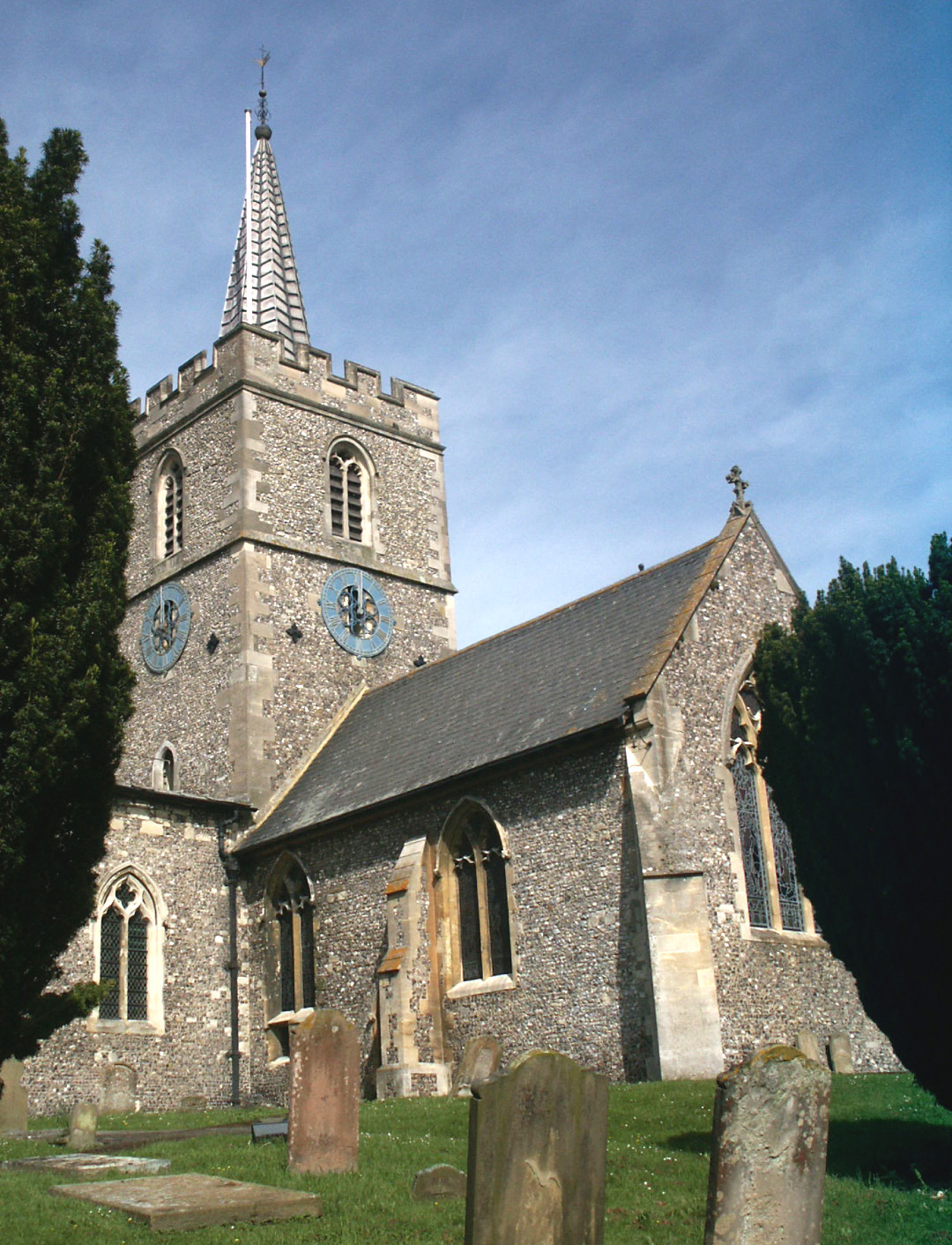
St. Mary's Church

Richard Bowle (c. 1549 – 13 December 1626), who had recorded and audited the restoration project of 1606, is commemorated by a black marble monument on the north side of the chancel, noting his "faithful service of divers great lords", and that "part of" him "lyeth here". (Note: Richard Bowle's son John Bowle was to become a notable churchman of the 17th century, serving as Bishop of Rochester from 1629 to 1637.)

On the north wall of the sanctuary is a large memorial to Richard Woodcock, who had served as vicar of both Chesham Woburn and Chesham Leicester from 1607 to 1623. Topped by a large painted bust of Woodcock holding a book, a lengthy gilded inscription in Latin and English describes Woodcock as "Hæreticorum Malleus" ("The hammer of heretics"). Woodcock had been a popular local figure, and at his death the parishioners had taken it in turns to carry the coffin to the church. Near the memorial to Woodcock is a memorial to Nicholas Skottowe erected in 1800. This takes the form of a stone sculpture of a mourning woman kneeling over a sarcophagus, and was described by Pevsner as "[an] interpretation of remarkable tenderness".

During Scott's renovations of the 1860s, all burials within the church itself were removed. However, during the 1999 renovation, a vault was uncovered near the crossing. The vault was marked by a brass plaque inscribed "The Family Vault of Robert Ward", and was found to contain the coffins of Catherine Julia Ward, wife of novelist and Tory politician Robert Plumer Ward, and of their three-year-old son Charles Robert Ward. The vault has been resealed and remains in place.

Adolphus Aylward, the vicar from 1847 to 1872 and overseer of the parish restructuring, is commemorated by a brass plaque on the south-west pillar of the tower, and by a Clayton and Bell window in the north-west chancel. Aylward's daughter Julia had died in 1862 aged 15 and is buried in the churchyard; her grave was planted with snowdrops at her mother's request, which still bloom each spring. Julia Aylward is also commemorated by a piece of Burlison and Grylls glass in the lancet window at the west end of the north aisle.

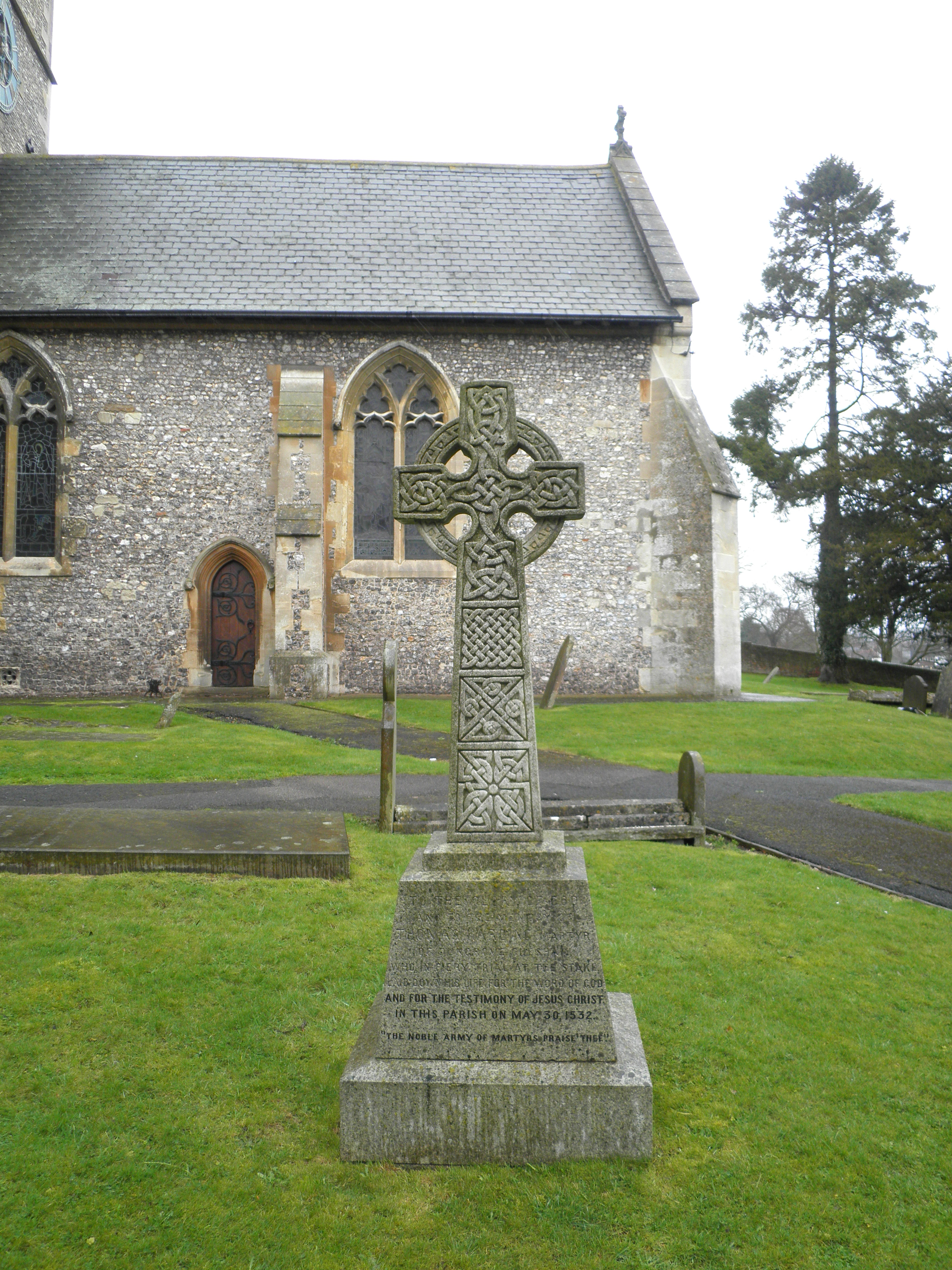
Thomas Harding memorial

A memorial to Lollard martyr Thomas Harding stands in the churchyard near the south chancel, erected in 1907 by the Protestant Alliance. The base of the cross is inscribed:

To the glory of God and to the memory of Thomas Harding Martyr of Dungrove Chesham
Who in fiery trial at the stake laid down his life for the word of God and for the testimony of Jesus Christ in this parish on May 30, 1532
"The noble army of martyrs praise thee"
"God grant to us all grace to ken well and to kepe well holie writ and to suffer joiefulli some pain for it at the laste."
"None of us liveth to himself and no man dieth to himself."

Harding was executed at nearby White Hill and is believed to have been held in St. Mary's parvise prior to his execution. Foxe's Book of Martyrs describes the execution thus:

In 1532, Thomas Harding, who with his wife, had been accused of heresy, was brought before the Bishop of Lincoln, and condemned for denying the real presence in the Sacrament. He was then chained to a stake, erected for the purpose, at Chesham in the Dell, near Botely; and when they had set fire to the fagots, one of the spectators dashed out his brains with a billet. The priests told the people that whoever brought fagots to burn heretics would have an indulgence to commit sins for forty days.

Near the memorial to Harding by the chancel door is a worn gravestone depicting a teacher and a group of children, believed to be the grave of Daniel King, teacher in Chesham's first Sunday School.

== Notes and references ==
=== Bibliography ===
- Barber, Janet (2001), Buckinghamshire: A County Guide, Barnaby's Relocation Guides, vol. 3, London: Cv Publications, ISBN 1-901161-64-1
- Demuth, Tim (2003), The Spread of London's Underground, Harrow Weald: Capital Transport, ISBN 1-85414-266-6
- Foxell, Shirley; Foxell, Clive (2004), St Mary's Church, Chesham, Chesham: Clive Foxell, ISBN 0-9529184-4-7
- Pevsner, Nikolaus (1960), Buckinghamshire, Buildings of England, Harmondsworth: Penguin, ISBN 0-14-071019-1
- Rowley, Trevor (2006), The English Landscape in the Twentieth Century, London: Hambledon Continuum, ISBN 1-85285-388-3, OCLC 61702983
