= St Mary's Church, Wimbledon =

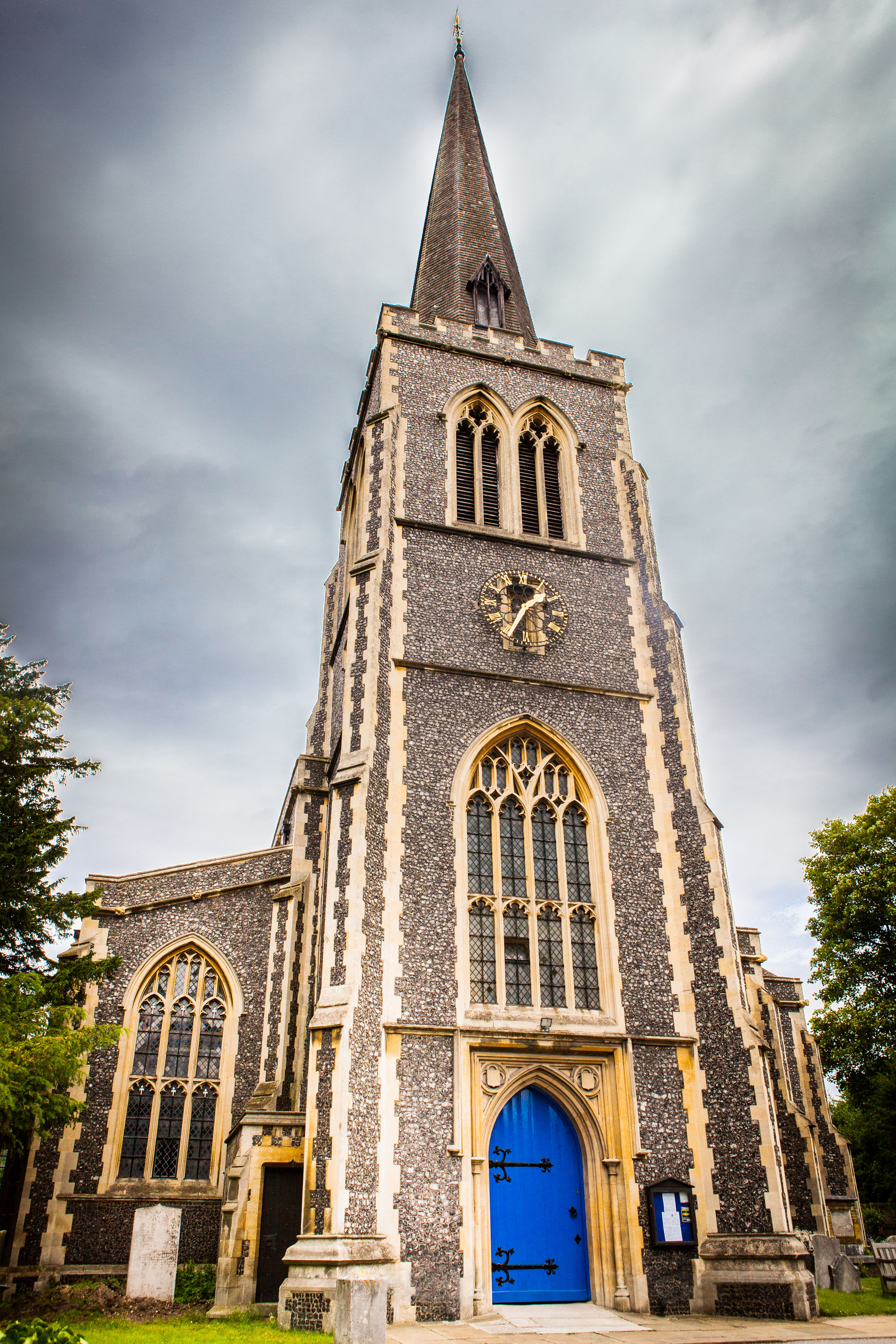
- St Mary's Church

- 51°25′43″N 0°12′38″W
- OS grid reference: TQ 24502 71458
- Location: Wimbledon, London
- Country: England
- Denomination: Church of England
- Website: Church website

History
- Founded: before 1086

Architecture
- Heritage designation: Grade II*
- Architect: Sir George Gilbert Scott
- Style: Gothic Architecture
- Years built: 1843

Administration
- Diocese: Diocese of Southwark
- Archdeaconry: Archdeaconry of Lambeth
- Deanery: Merton
- Parish: Parish of Wimbledon

Clergy
- Rector: Amanda Hodgson (associate priest Nils Bersweden)

St Mary's Church, Wimbledon, is a Church of England church and is part of the Parish of Wimbledon, south-west London, England. It has existed since the 12th century and may be the church recorded in the Domesday Book in the Mortlake Hundred. It is still in active use today, and has been grade II* listed since 1949.

== History ==
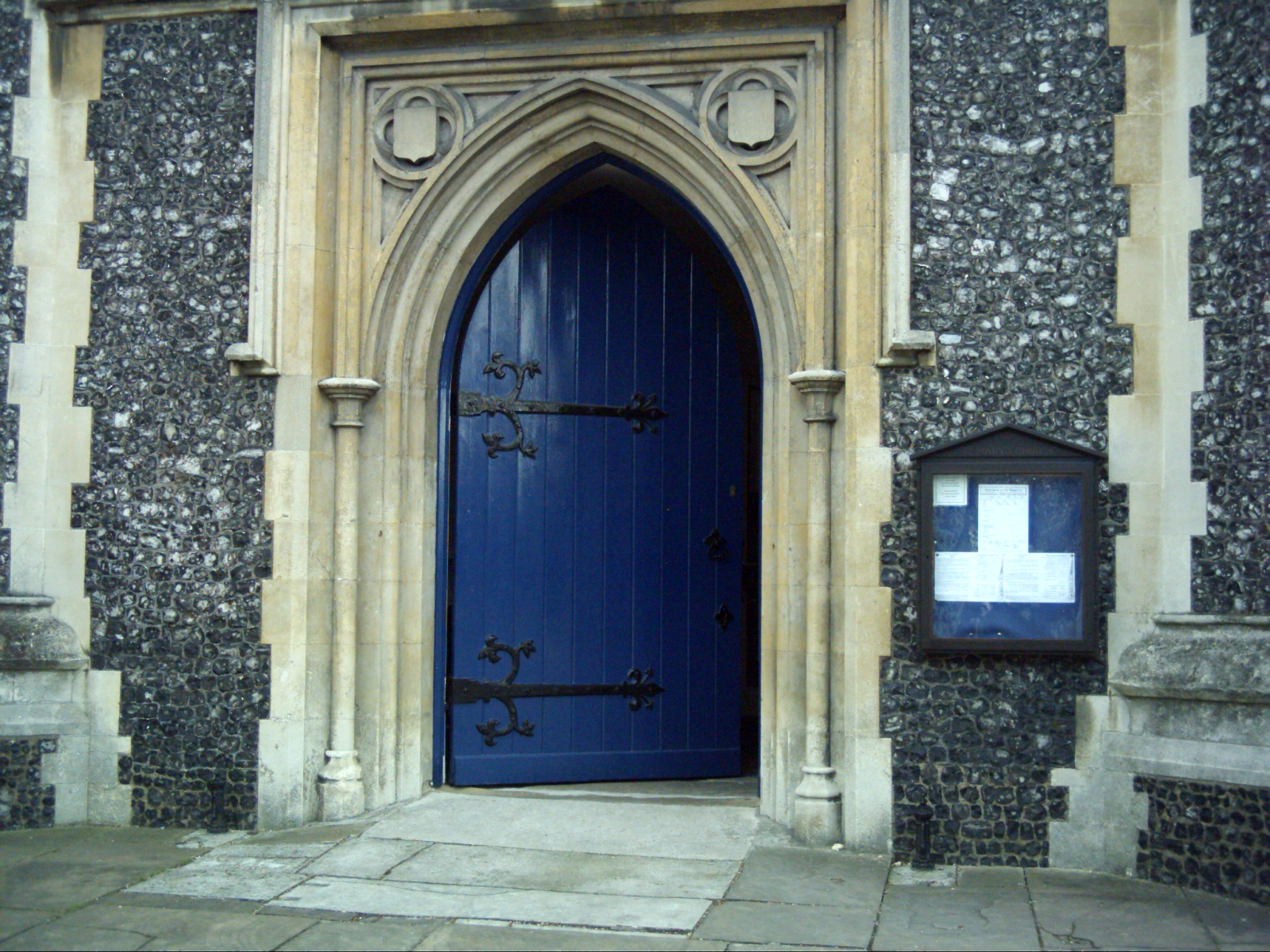
West Door of St Mary's Church

There have been four churches on the site since 1086:

- The Medieval Church — 11th century to 13th century.
- The Second Church — Late 13th century until 1786.
- The Georgian Church — 1780s to 1840s.
- The Victorian Church — Completed in 1843 and exists today.

=== The Victorian Church ===
The present church dates from 1843, and was designed by Sir George Gilbert Scott, then working for the architects 'Messers Scott and Moffat'. Scott was given the brief of building the church without exceeding a strict budget of £4000, which he succeeded in doing by incorporating parts of the earlier building. It is still possible to see these older parts today. Another visibly notable addition was the tower and spire, which is 196 feet tall.

The beams in the chancel roof were re-discovered during renovation work of the chancel in 1860. They are thought to be Medieval in origin. The beams are decorated with a chevron and flower pattern and were restored in 1993 as part of the church's 150th anniversary celebrations.

== Memorials ==
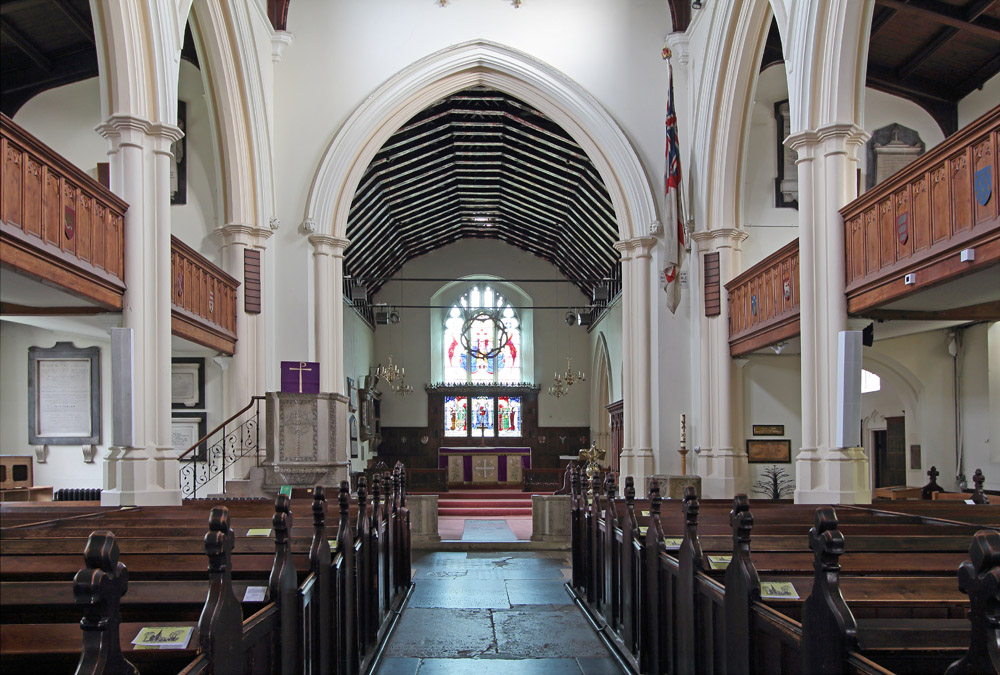
The east window was paid for by the church's organist Kezia Peache in memory of her father

The oldest memorial in the church dates back to 1537; it is in memory of Philip and Margaret Lewston and was commissioned by their daughter Katherine Walter, who has a memorial also within the present church.

Edward Cecil, 1st Viscount Wimbledon, Lord of the Manor of Wimbledon has his sarcophagus situated within the eponymous side chapel that he had commissioned in the 1620s. The chapel was notably originally lit with six small windows to commemorate his two wives and four daughters. In 1651, Dorothy Cecil left an endowment for the upkeep of her father's tomb, with any surplus to be used for the education and apprenticeship of local children.

Sir Richard Wynn, a 17th-century Member of Parliament, is buried within the nave; he had notably taken care of Wimbledon Manor House for Henrietta Maria, wife of Charles I, after she fled to the continent in 1642 during the Civil War.

Sir Theodore Janssen, Lord of the Manor of Wimbledon, who was one of the founders of the Bank of England and director of the ill-fated South Sea Company, is also commemorated.

Two more modern brasses commemorate the abolitionist William Wilberforce, of the nearby Lauriston House, and Walter Reynolds, who was formerly the rector of the church and, later, the Archbishop of Canterbury.

The most recent memorials commemorate Leslie Godfree and Kathleen McKane Godfree who were highly successful tennis players in the early 20th century.

=== Burials ===
At the east end of the churchyard is the large mausoleum of Sir Joseph William Bazalgette, the renowned engineer of the Embankment and the sewer system in London around 1858. There is also a memorial stone to Sir Joseph within the church, while a number of his descendants are in the book of remembrance. In the churchyard are buried the artist Fred Barnard (1846-1896) and the bibliographer and Shakespearian scholar Alfred W Pollard (1859-1944).

== Church halls ==
Fellowship House was built in 1974 and replaced a small room above a shop in Wimbledon Village. It was used for many activities both by the church and outside groups. Today, it is a day nursery during the week and is used by the church at weekends. The Parish Office is located in Fellowship House.

The Garden Hall was completed in 2003 due to the need of more space for church activities, especially the growing Sunday School. The building is of modern design, and has won architectural awards. One wall is a large glass window, part of which opens to give access to the grass area outside. It was officially opened on 3 May 2003 by Princess Alexandra, The Honourable Lady Ogilvy.

== Bells ==
St Mary's has 8 church bells.

In 1984, there was a refit of all the 8 bells. The oldest is the original No. 7 dedicated to St. Bartholemew. This bell was made by a London Bell Foundry, circa 1520.

== Services ==
Sundays:

- 8:00am — Holy Communion
- 9:30am — Sung Eucharist
- 11:15am — Informal Worship
- 6:30pm — Evensong

=== Live Streaming Services ===
St Mary's has a full streaming system to stream onto both Zoom and YouTube. Every service is streamed apart from the 11:15. A full refit of the streaming system came in January 2022 and has since proven very effective in introducing more members to the church services.

== St Mary's Church, Wimbledon, in popular culture ==
The church tower appears in the cover photograph for the 1969 Fairport Convention album Unhalfbricking.

== Other local churches ==
See: Parish of Wimbledon

=== In Wimbledon Team Ministry ===
- St Mark's Wimbledon
- St Matthew's Wimbledon
- St John's Wimbledon

=== In local area ===
- Emmanuel Church, Wimbledon.
- Christ Church, West Wimbledon
- Holy Trinity, South Wimbledon
- Sacred Heart Church, Wimbledon (Roman Catholic)
- St Mary's Church, Merton Park
- Trinity Church, Wimbledon (URC)

== See also ==
- Parish of Wimbledon
- Wimbledon Manor House
