= Henry Marney, 1st Baron Marney =

English politician

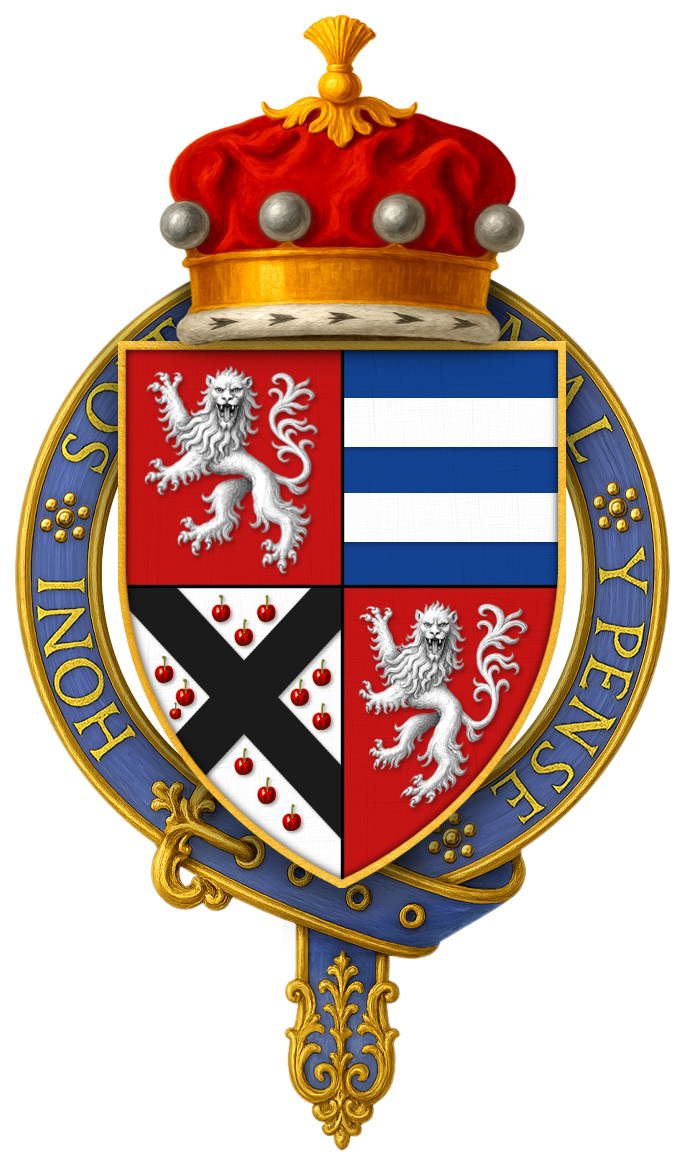
Arms of Sir Henry Marney, 1st Baron Marney, KG

Henry Marney, 1st Baron Marney KG (c. 1447 – 4 May 1523) of Layer Marney, Essex was a politician of the Tudor period in England. He was a favourite of Henry VIII and captain of his guard.

== Life ==
He was the son of John Marney and his wife Joan Throckmorton of the Coughton Court Throckmortons.

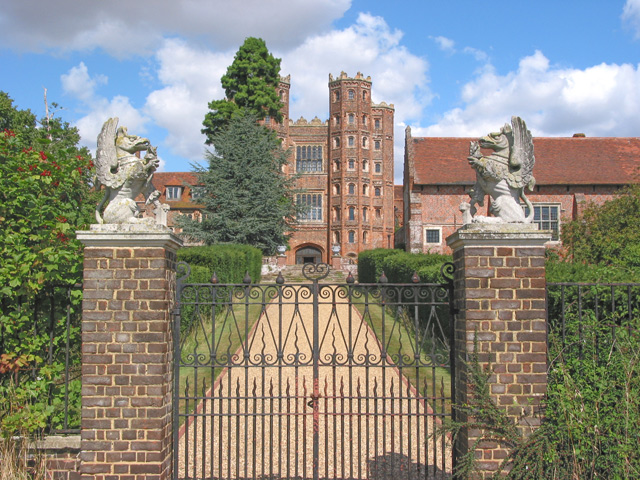
Layer Marney Tower

He rose to favour in the Royal household of King Henry VII during the battles of Bosworth and Stoke and following the rout of Perkin Warbeck in 1497. He was appointed to the Privy Council.

When King Henry VIII acceded to the Throne in 1509 Marney was made a Knight of the Garter and honoured with a tranche of public offices, including Chancellor of the Duchy of Lancaster, Lord Privy Seal, Vice-Chamberlain of the Household, Warden of the Stannaries and Captain of the Yeomen of the Guard. Along with the other Knights of the Garter he accompanied Henry VIII in 1520 to his meeting with Francis I of France at the Field of the Cloth of Gold.

He was made Keeper of the Privy Seal and ennobled in the last year of his life as the first Baron Marney.

In 1515 he had begun building the Tudor-style Layer Marney Tower in Layer Marney which is now visited by thousands of people annually. The uncompleted house was inherited by his son, John, Governor of Rochester Castle. John continued the building work but died himself just two years later, leaving no male heirs to continue the family line or to complete the construction of Layer Marney.

== Marriage and issue ==
He died in 1523, having married twice, firstly Thomasine, the daughter of Sir John Arundell and secondly Elizabeth (Isobel), the daughter of Sir Nicholas Wyfold, Lord Mayor of London.

With Thomasine he had three children:

- John, 2nd Baron Marney (who first married Christian Newburgh (b. 1466 – d. 6 August 1517), daughter of Roger Newburgh, then second married c. 1518 Bridget Waldegrave (d. September 1549); his daughters Catherine and Elizabeth survived him),
- Catherine (who first married Edward Knyvet of Stanway then upon his death married Thomas Bonham, MP (d. 1532), and had issue), and
- Thomas, who died young

With Elizabeth he had several children, including:

- Grace (married to Edmund Bedingfield)

== Heraldry ==
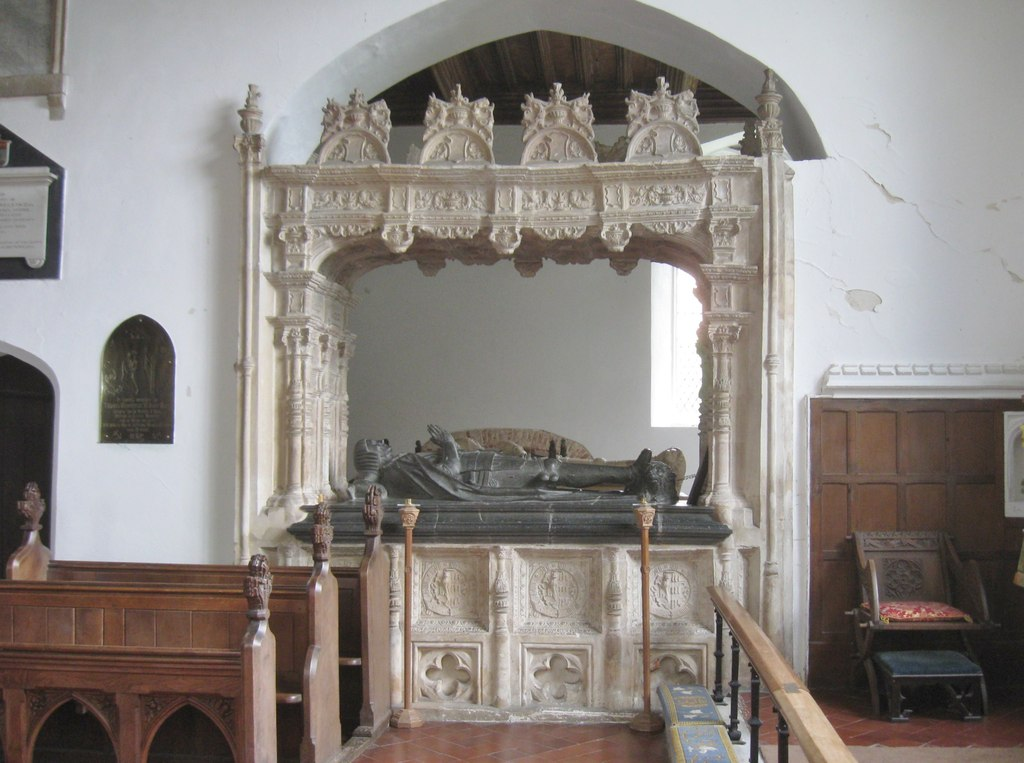
Monument to Henry Marney in the Church of St Mary the Virgin, Layer Marney

In his garter stall, Henry Marney quarters the Marney arms (at 1 and 4) with Sergeaux (at 3) and the senior branch of Venables (at 4) because of his ancestry:

Sir Robert de Marny quartered the arms of his parents, Sir William de Marny and Catherine Venables. He married Alice le Lacer in 1345. Their son was Sir William (c.1370-1414), of Layer Marney, Essex and Kingsey, Buckinghamshire, a Sheriff of Cornwall, then of Essex and Hertfordshire. He married Elizabeth Sergeaux, daughter and co-heiress of Sir Richard Sergeaux of Colquite, Cornwall (d. 30 Sep 1393). Sir William Marney's heir, Thomas, served under Clarence when Henry V first invaded France and was knighted, but he died in 1421, perhaps at Baugé, leaving the family estates to his younger brother John. The latter's son, Sir Henry Marney KG, was created Lord Marney by Henry VIII.

== Ancestry ==
Ancestors of Henry Marney, 1st Baron Marney

16. Sir William de Marny
8. Sir Robert de Marny
17. Catherine Venables
4. Sir William Marney (c.1370-1414)
18. Richard Lacer (d.1361)
9. Alice le Lacer
19. Juliana
2. John Marney
20. Sir Richard Cergeaux
10. Sir Richard Sergeaux (d. 30 Sep 1393)
21. Margaret Seneschal
5. Elizabeth Sergeaux
1. Henry Marney, 1st Baron Marney

Political offices
Preceded by Sir Richard Empson	Chancellor of the Duchy of Lancaster; 1509–1523	Succeeded by Sir Richard Wingfield
Preceded by Sir Henry Guilford	Captain of the Yeomen of the Guard; 1521–1523	Succeeded by Sir William Kingston
Preceded by Thomas Ruthall	Lord Privy Seal; 1523	Succeeded by Cuthbert Tunstall
Peerage of England
New creation	Baron Marney; April – May 1523	Succeeded by John Marney
