= Thomas Harding =

English religious dissident

Thomas Harding (born 1448 in Cambridge, Gloucestershire, England and died at Chesham, Buckinghamshire, England, May 1532) was a sixteenth-century English religious dissident who, while waiting to be burnt at the stake as a Lollard in 1532, was struck on the head by a spectator with one of the pieces of firewood, which killed him instantly.

Harding's unconventional beliefs had placed him in jeopardy twice before. As a resident of Amersham, he had associated with other prominent Lollards, notably William Tylesworth and John Scrivener, attending their secret conventicles where prayers and readings were conducted in English, which was forbidden, rather than in Latin.

In 1506 or 1511 William Smith, Bishop of Lincoln, set up an enquiry into heresy in Amersham. Tylesworth, openly declaring his faith and refusing to recant his beliefs, was sentenced to burn, while Harding, along with many other Lollard sympathisers, agreed to recant and was given a penance. By 1521 he had returned to holding Lollard belief, and was again called before an ecclesiastical court set up by the new bishop, hardliner John Longland, personal confessor to Henry VIII. On this occasion six Lollards, five men and one woman, were sentenced to burn at the stake, but Harding again escaped death by recanting a second time.

Harding's Memorial on White Hill in Chesham

In May 1532, now living in Chesham, he was arrested while reading The Obedience of a Christian Man by William Tyndale, and a search of his house revealed several other works by Tyndale, including The New Testament in English and The Practice of Prelates.

At his trial he was convicted of a series of customary Lollard heretical beliefs, with a small admixture that was unquestionably Lutheran, derived, no doubt, from his reading of Tyndale. He had remained what he had for so long been – a determined Lollard, with views (on images for example) that were Lollard rather than Lutheran, but quiet study had begun to carry him on in the direction of continental Protestantism.

Some consider Thomas Harding to be a Protestant martyr based on the description of his death in Foxe's Book of Martyrs. The relevant text is:

In 1532, Thomas Harding, who with his wife, had been accused of heresy, was brought before the Bishop of Lincoln, and condemned for denying the real presence in the Sacrament. He was then chained to a stake, erected for the purpose, at Chesham in the Dell, near Botely; and when they had set fire to the fagots, one of the spectators dashed out his brains with a billet. The priests told the people that whoever brought fagots to burn heretics would have an indulgence to commit sins for forty days.

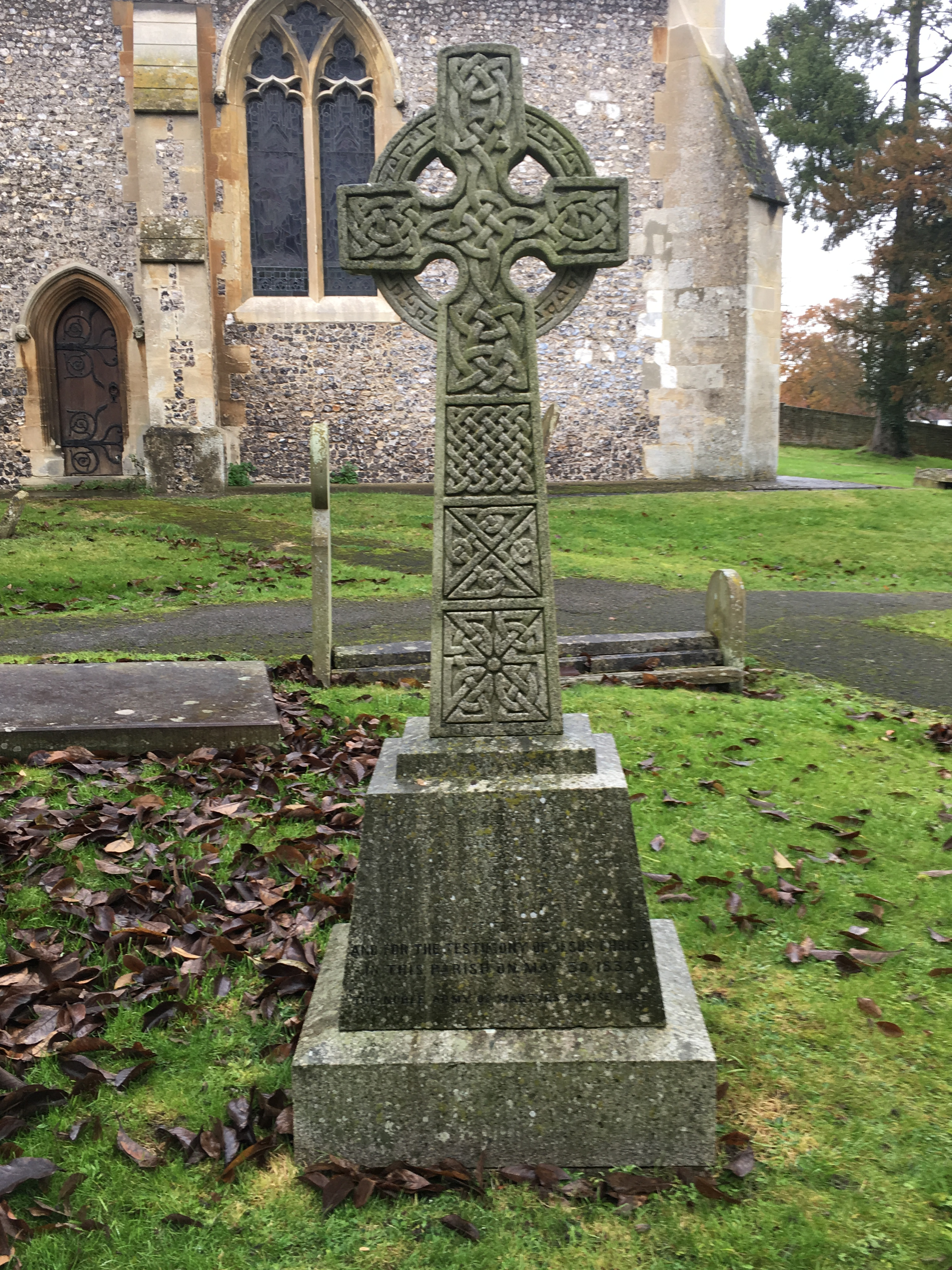
Thomas Harding Memorial at St. Mary's Church in Chesham

There are several memorials to Thomas Harding, including that pictured to the right, which can be found in the graveyard of St Mary's Church in Chesham. Another is on the turn of White Hill on the site of the former Three Tuns pub. Harding's name is also on the Amersham Martyrs Memorial in Amersham, which also mentions William Tylesworth, John Scrivener and others. It is said that Thomas Harding spent the evening before his trial gaoled in a room known as the parvise, above the porch of St Mary's Church in Chesham. Today, Thomas Harding Primary School in Chesham is named after him.

== Sources ==
- Lambert, Malcolm. Medieval Heresy: Popular Movements from the Gregorian Reform to the Reformation. New York: Barnes & Noble, 1977.
- Baines, Arnold & Foxell, Shirley. "The Life & Times of Thomas Harding, Chesham's Lollard Martyr" Clive Foxell, 2010
