= Layer Marney Tower =

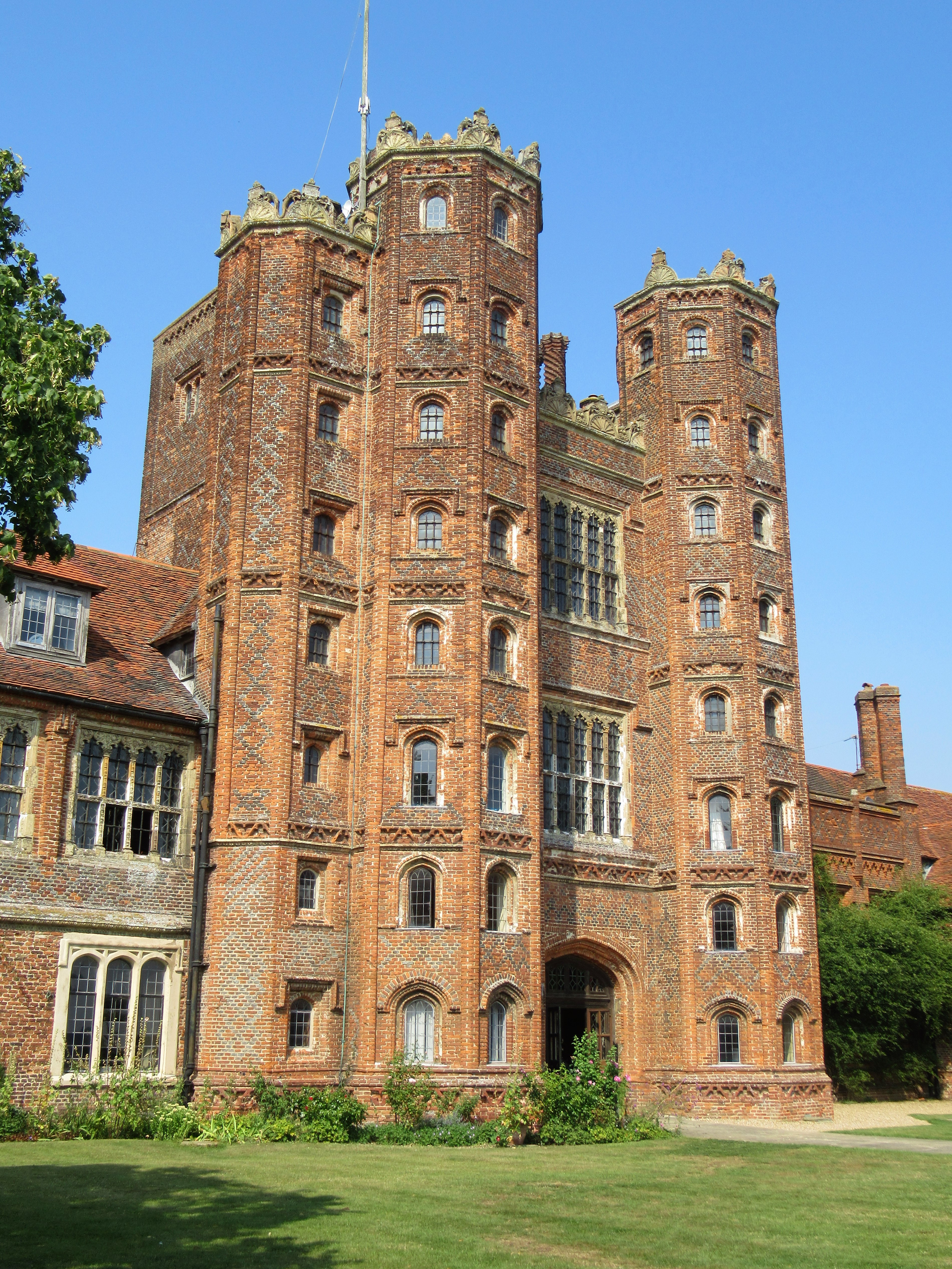
- Layer Marney Tower Gatehouse, the tallest Tudor gatehouse in Britain

- Location within Essex
- 51°49′21″N 0°47′48″E
- Type: Prodigy House
- Location: Layer Marney, Essex

History
- Built: c.1523

Site notes
- Architectural style: Tudor
- Website: layermarneytower.co.uk

Layer Marney Tower is an incomplete early Tudor country house, with gardens and parkland, dating from about 1523, in Layer Marney, Essex, England, between Colchester and Maldon. The building was designated Grade I listed in 1952.

The large gatehouse tower is much the most striking element to be completed and to survive.

Constructed in the first half of the reign of Henry VIII, Layer Marney Tower is in many ways the apotheosis of the Tudor gatehouse, and is the tallest example in Britain. It is contemporaneous with East Barsham Manor in Norfolk and Sutton Place, Surrey, with which latter building it shares the rare combination of brick and terracotta construction. The building is principally the creation of Henry 1st Lord Marney, who died in 1523, and his son John, who continued the building work but died just two years later, leaving no male heirs to continue the family line or the construction. What was completed was the main range measuring some 300 feet (91 m) long, the principal gatehouse that is about 80 feet (24 m) tall, an array of outbuildings, and a new church.

== History ==
The buildings suffered considerable damage from the Great English earthquake of 1884, and a subsequent report in The Builder magazine described the state of the house as such that "the outlay needed to restore the towers to anything like a sound and habitable condition would be so large that the chance of the work ever being done appears remote indeed". The repairs were begun by brother and sister Alfred Peache and Kezia Peache, who re-floored and re-roofed the gatehouse, as well as creating the garden to the south of the Tower.

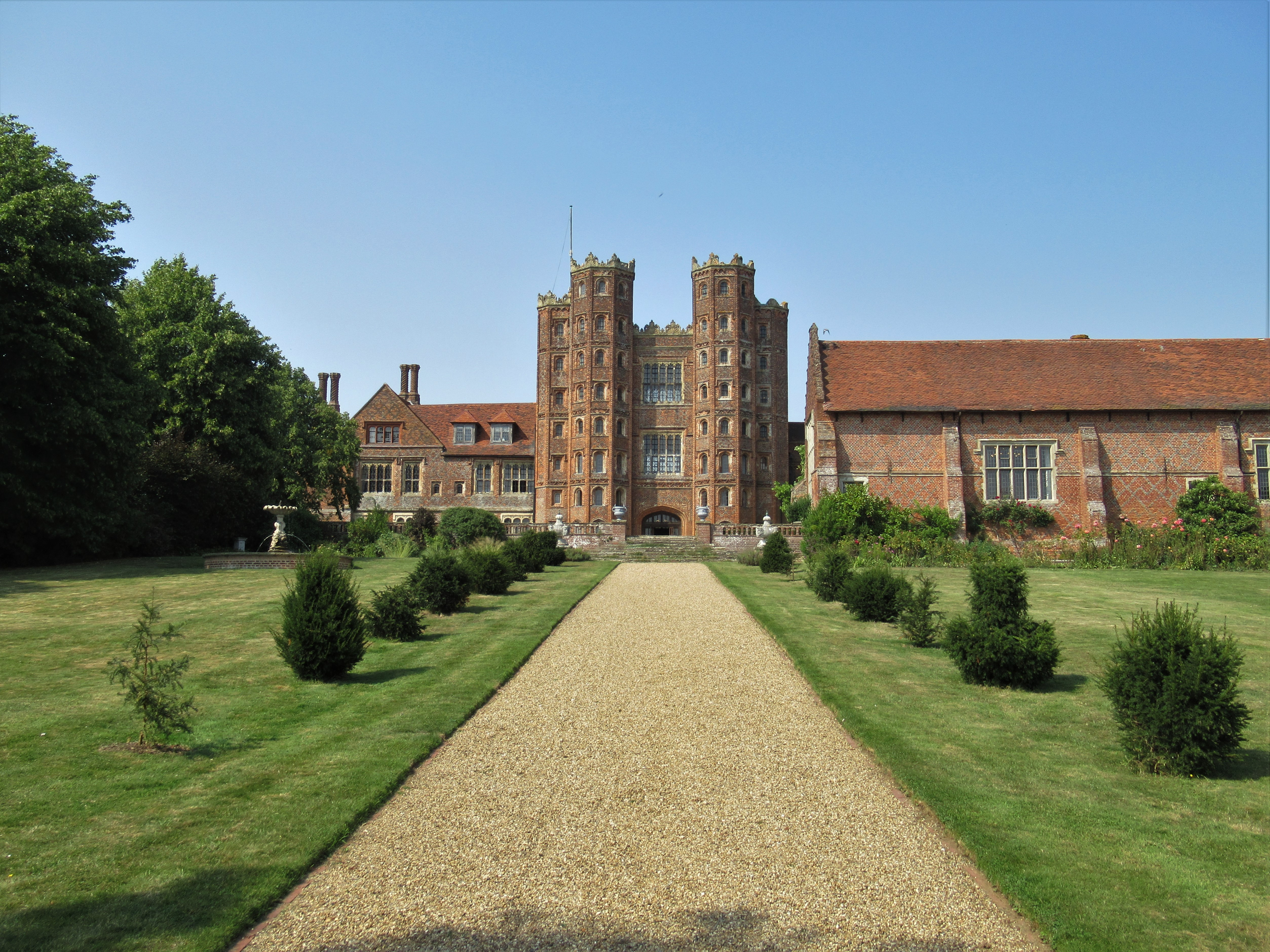
The house and tower from the garden

The next owner was Walter de Zoete who carried on and expanded the work, with a team of 13 domestic and 16 outside staff. He enlarged the gardens, built a folly known as the Tea House (converted to a self-catering holiday cottage in 1999), and converted the stables into a Long Gallery where he housed his collection of furniture, paintings and objets d'arts.

Walter de Zoete lost money in the Japanese stock market crash, and sold the house to a Dr and Mrs Campbell. The house came to the present owners, the Charringtons, in 1959. Gerald and Susan Charrington had been married in Layer Marney church in 1957; two years later Mrs Campbell's executors put the house up for sale and the Charringtons purchased it. It has been occupied by the Charrington family ever since.

The gardens are listed as Grade II on the English Heritage Register of Historic Parks and Gardens of Special Historic Interest in England, while the building itself was designated Grade I in 1952.

In 2023 the tower and gardens are open to the public from mid-April to 1 October for a small admission fee. The tower is also available for wedding ceremonies and receptions, as well as conferences. It has proved popular as a media location. Films and television programs which feature shots of Layer Marney Tower include Preaching to the Perverted, Pasolini's Canterbury Tales, and Lovejoy. In September 2010, episode 5 of the BBC's Climbing Great Buildings explored the tower in detail, then in December 2011 it was the venue for BBC1's Antiques Roadshow..
