= Kezia Peache =

- Born: 1820; Lambeth
- Died: 16 March 1899 (aged 78–79); Wimbledon
- Occupations: organist and benefactor

Kezia Peache (1820 – 16 March 1899) was an English church organist and a benefactor. She funded cottages in Wimbledon, a college of Divinity and the repair of Layer Marney Tower.

== Life ==
Peache was born in Lambeth in 1820. Her parents were Alice (née Coventry) and James Courthope Peache. They had twelve children, but many of them died as children. Their father dealt in timber, he built barges and he owned them.

Peache was educated at Prospect House School. In 1845 she went on a tour of Europe with her elder brother Clement, before returning to live with her brother in Mangotsfield where Alfred was a perpetual curate. She was there until 1850 when her brother married and she returned to Wimbledon.

She and her brother Alfred came into a large and unexpected fortune. Their elder brother, Clement, died suddenly. He would have been their father's presumed heir, but within weeks their father died and his possessions needed to be reassigned by the executors and that was Kezia and Alfred. She and Alfred, gained an equal share in their father's legacy.

According to one source they prayed together and decided that they needed to build a college of divinity. Alfred paid for the construction of the London College of Divinity and when his money was gone then Kezia agreed to contribute from her fortune.

From the 1850s she was a major supporter of the Cottage Improvement Society and their work in Wimbledon to create a home for people of limited means. She funded the construction of Bertram Cottages, cottages of Belvedere Square, more off Church Road and Courthope Villas. The Bertram Colleges were designed by Henry Charles Forde whose main business was laying international telephone cables. Forde's designs for the cottages give some of them have a "K" or a "P" worked into the design of the brickwork to recognise Kezia Peache.

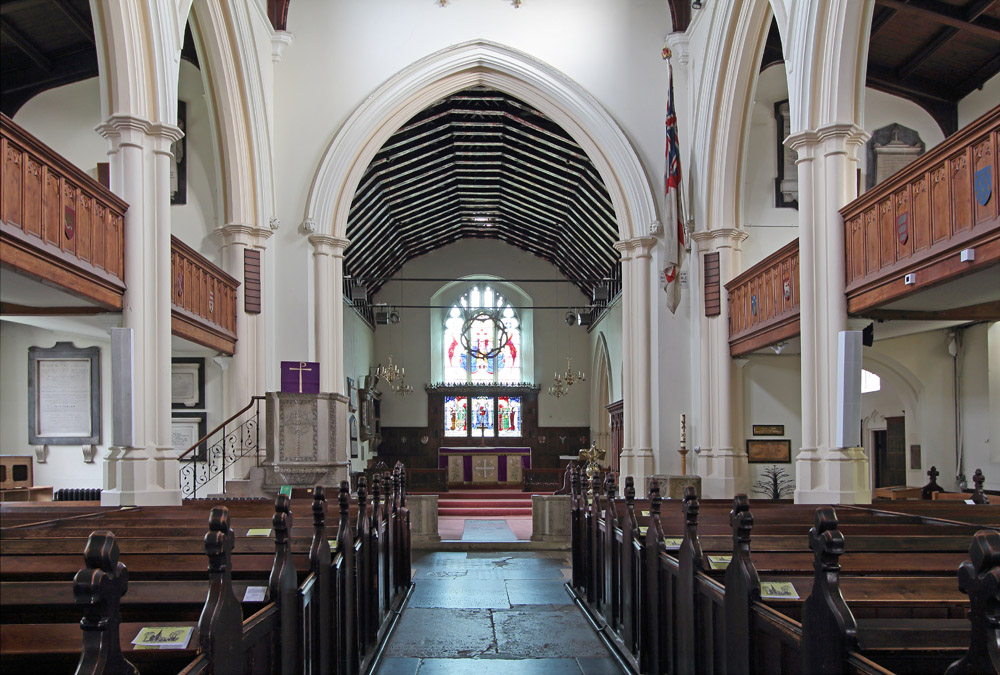
St Mary's Church in Wimbledon

In 1854 she became the organist at St Mary's Church in Wimbledon and she was also a Sunday School teacher there. The east window of the church was created as a memorial to her father. In 1879 Peache and her brother took an interest in a Tudor palace in Essex and these philanthropists became the Lord and Lady of the Manor of Layer Marney. The Peache siblings paid for the substantial repairs required to Layer Marney Tower.

Peache died in Wimbledon. The college of divinity that she and her brother funded lasted for 156 years before it closed in 2019 with a falling role and poor finances.
