= Amersham Martyrs Memorial =

Coordinates: 51°40′08″N 0°36′30″W

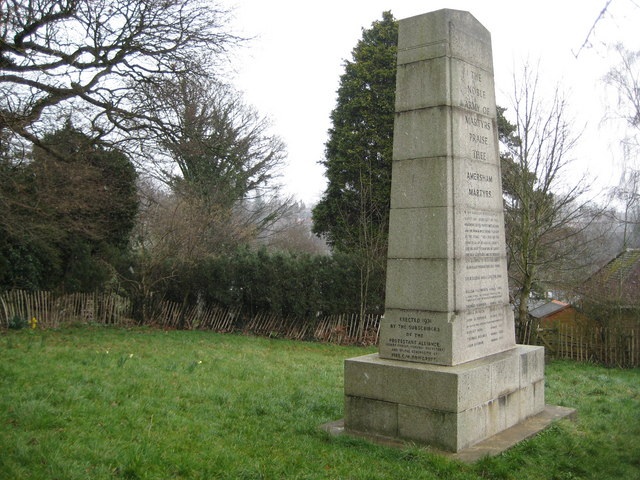
The memorial in 2008

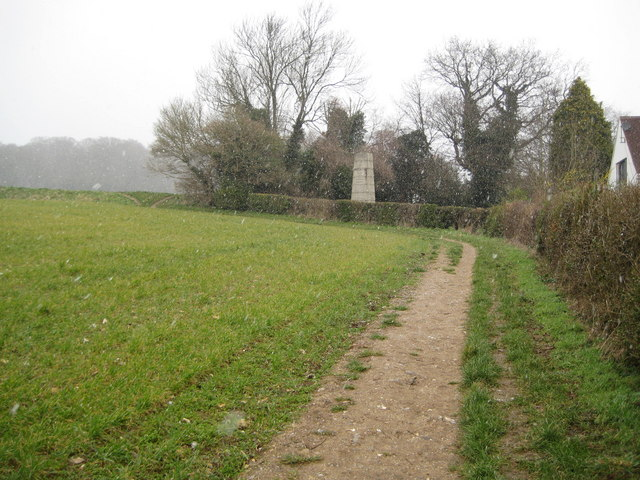
The approach to the memorial

The Amersham Martyrs Memorial is a memorial to Protestant martyrs in Amersham, Buckinghamshire.

It was established in 1931 by The Protestant Alliance. The memorial was unveiled by a Mrs L. R. Raine, a direct descendant of martyr Thomas Harding, who is commemorated on the memorial. It is located near the Rectory or Parsonage Woods opposite Ruccles Field. Access is from a footpath from or a separate footpath from Station Road.

The memorial commemorates the deaths of seven local Protestant martyrs and Lollards (six men and one woman) who were burnt at the stake in 1506 and 1521. It also commemorates the deaths of three Amersham men who were burned elsewhere including Great Missenden, Smithfield, and Chesham between 1506 and 1532, as well as one Amersham man who was strangled to death at Woburn in 1514. According to the memorial's inscription below, the children of William Tylsworth (-1506) and John Scrivener (-1521) were "compelled" to light the fire under their fathers' pyre. The memorial stands 100 yards from the site of the executions.

At the unveiling of the memorial in 1931 the assembled crowd was exhorted by a speaker to maintain "Protestant King on a Protestant throne and be ruled by a Protestant parliament". The chairman of the Protestant Alliance, Major Richard Rigg, delivered a speech at the unveiling of the memorial and the hymn "For All the Saints" was sung. In his 2019 book Sacred and Secular Martyrdom in Britain and Ireland since 1914, John Wolffe placed the creation of the memorial and others to martyrs in the context of memorials created in the aftermath of the First World War and their accompanying militaristic imagery.

A play about the martyrs, The Life and time of the Martyrs of Amersham and the Community in Which they Lived was staged by the local community in Amersham in March 2016.

== Inscription ==
THE
NOBLE
ARMY OF
MARTYRS
PRAISE
THEE

IN THE SHALLOW OF DEPRESSION AT
A SPOT 100 YARDS LEFT OF THIS
MONUMENT SEVEN PROTESTANTS, SIX MEN
AND ONE WOMAN WERE BURNED TO DEATH
AT THE STAKE. THEY DIED FOR THE
PRINCIPLES OF RELIGIOUS LIBERTY,
FOR THE RIGHT TO READ AND INTERPRET
THE HOLY SCRIPTURES AND TO WORSHIP
GOD ACCORDING TO THEIR CONSCIENCES
AS REVEALED THROUGH GOD'S HOLY WORD

THEIR NAMES SHALL LIVE FOR EVER

WILLIAM TYLESWORTH BURNED 1506
(JOAN CLARKE, HIS MARRIED DAUGHTER, WAS
COMPELLED TO LIGHT THE FAGGOTS TO BURN HER FATHER)
THOMAS BARNARD BURNED 1521
JAMES MORDEN BURNED 1521
JOHN SCRIVENER BURNED 1521
(HIS CHILDREN WERE COMPELLED TO LIGHT THEIR FATHER'S PYRE)
ROBERT RAVE BURNED 1521
THOMAS HOLMES BURNED 1521
JOAN NORMAN BURNED 1521

THE FOLLOWING MEN, WORSHIPPERS AT AMERSHAM, WERE MARTYRED IN OTHER PLACES
ROBERT COSIN
OF GREAT MISSENDEN BURNED BUCKINGHAM 1506
THOMAS CHASE,
STRANGLED AT WOBURN BUCKS
HIS BODY WAS BURIED AT NORLAND WOODS 1514
THOMAS MAN
BURNED AT SMITHFIELD 1518
THOMAS HARDING
BURNED AT CHESHAM 1532

ERECTED 1931 BY THE SUBSCRIBERS OF THE PROTESTANT ALLIANCE
(HENRY FOWLER, GENERAL SECRETARY)
AND BY THE GENEROSITY OF
MRS E.M. ROWCROFT.
