= The Haystack in the Floods =

"The Haystack in the Floods" is a narrative poem of 160 lines by William Morris, the Victorian writer and designer. First published in The Defence of Guenevere, and Other Poems in 1858, it is one of his best-known poems.

== Plot ==
The poem is a grimly realistic piece set in France during the Hundred Years' War. The doomed lovers Jehane and Robert de Marny flee with a small escort through a convincingly portrayed rain-swept countryside, to reach the safety of English-held Gascony. They are however intercepted by the treacherous Godmar and have a last despairing parting besides the "old soaked hay" of the title. The encounter takes place shortly after the Battle of Poitiers but the characters Godmar and Jehane are entirely fictional. Morris used the name of an English knight Sir Robert de Marny, who was born in Essex and fought at Poitiers but who did not die in the manner recited.

== Text ==
Three passages from the poem are most often quoted:

The in medias res opening:

Had she come all the way for this,
To part at last without a kiss?
Yea, had she borne the dirt and rain
That her own eyes might see him slain
Beside the haystack in the floods?

— lines 1-5

Godmar's threat to Jehane if she does not become his mistress:

Eh? lies my Jehane? by God's head,
At Paris folks would deem them true!
Do you know, Jehane, they cry for you,
'Jehane the brown! Jehane the brown!
Give us Jehane to burn or drown!'—

— lines 104-108

And the forlorn conclusion, following Robert's brutal slaying by Godmar and his men:

She shook her head and gazed awhile
At her cold hands with a rueful smile,
As though this thing had made her mad.

This was the parting that they had
Beside the haystack in the floods.

— lines 156-160

== Criticism ==
The poem succeeds because of its narrative pace, rather than ostentatiously-crafted language. It was one of the poems from Morris' early romantic period which were brought to the fore by historian E. P. Thompson (himself a published poet) in his 1955 biography of Morris. Against a dreary background of leafless dripping trees, rain and mud, the focus is on the Frenchwoman Jehane, her physical and emotional exhaustion as she is faced with impossible choices, her sudden ferocity as she responds to threats of rape, and her "strangely childlike" manner as she makes a final decision that will mean immediate death for her lover and her own execution as a witch or collaborator when returned to Paris.

== Influence ==
The American poet Amelia Josephine Burr (1878–1968) composed a sequel poem to "The Haystack in the Floods" under the title of "Jehane", written in broadly similar style.

Morris's poem provided the initial inspiration for C. L. Moore's science-fiction story "Shambleau".
