= Wimbledon (ecclesiastical parish) =

Wimbledon is an ecclesiastical parish and part of the Rural Deanery of Merton and Southwark Diocese in Wimbledon, London, UK. There are five churches, four of which are part of the Wimbledon Team Ministry.

== Churches ==
- St Mary's, St. Mary's Road.
- St Mark's, St Mark's Place.
- St Matthew's, Durham Road.51.411811°N 0.233681°W
- St John's, Spencer Hill
- Emmanuel Church, Wimbledon, 24 Ridgway.

== Wimbledon Team Ministry ==
There are four churches which are part of the team:

- St Mary's
- St Mark's
- St John's
- St Matthew's

== See also ==
- St Mary's Church, Wimbledon
