= Robert de Marny =

Sir Robert de Marny or Marney was an English knight who resided and died in Leyre-Marney, Essex. In 1335 King Edward III accorded him confirmation of the de Marny family charter, dating back to 1266. De Marny was the son of Sir William de Marney and Catherine Venables. According to church registers (questionable as most registers didn't start until 1539) he married Alice le Lacer after 1362 and was succeeded by their son William, who subsequently became Sheriff of Essex. The date of marriage to Alice le Lacer is based on the death of her first husband, Sir William Bruyn d.1362, son of Maurice Bruyn according to his Inquisition Post Mortem. de Marny held several manors from the le Bruyn family via Alice le Lacer until his death when they reverted to William Bruyn's heir Ingram or Ingelram Bruyn. The Manors included Rownor, Fordingbridge, Beckenham and Southwokyndon (Hampshire, Kent and Essex)

De Marny fought in the Battle of Poitiers or Poictiers (1356) in which the English defeated the French. He is best remembered now from William Morris's fictional poem "The Haystack in the Floods," which imagines his death in a skirmish while attempting to reach English-held Gascony.

== See also ==
- Robert Marney
