= Peache Trust =

The Peache Trust was an Anglican body formed in 1877 by Alfred Peache. It owns the advowson (the right to appoint the vicar) for a number of Anglican churches in England, and is responsible for selecting and appointing appropriate candidates as vicar for the churches in its trust. As of 2010 it held the advowson for 45 churches.

The Charity Commission for England and Wales identifies the trust as a "Removed charity" under number 289803. In 2020, its total gross income was £11.79k with total expenditure of £17.29k. In 2021, its total gross income was £0 and its total expenditure was £0.
