= Alfred Peache =

Church of England clergyman and benefactor (1818–1900)

Alfred Peache (1818-1900) was a Church of England clergyman, and philanthropist to Evangelical causes.

== Early life and education ==
Born in Lambeth in 1818 to James and Alice Peache (née Coventry), Peache and the family moved to Wimbledon in 1834. He studied at Wadham College, Oxford, graduating B.A. in 1841. He was ordained against his father's wishes in the following year.

== Career in the Church of England ==
Peache was curate of Mangotsfield in the diocese of Gloucester and Bristol from 1842 to 1854, and vicar from 1859 to 1874. In the intervening years he was curate of Heckfield in Hampshire. His final official post was as vicar of Downend from 1874 to 1878.

== Inheritance and philanthropy ==
He and his sister Kezia unexpectedly inherited the substantial family fortune when their father and older brother died in quick succession in 1857 and 1858. Already settled in their mode of life, the siblings decided to use their windfall to support good causes, mostly Evangelical. Most notably, Alfred and Kezia supported the foundation of the London College of Divinity in 1863 with a donation of £35,000, giving £100,000 to this training college for Evangelical Anglican clergy over the course of their lifetimes. Alfred also purchased the property leases of Monkton Combe School from its founder, the Revd Francis Pocock, before selling on to the Revd Henry Wright of the Church Missionary Society.

Alfred Peache also endowed the Peache Chair of Divinity at Huron College, London, Ontario, Canada, with £5,000, and was awarded an honorary D.D. from its successor institution, the University of Western Ontario, in 1881, and appointed Chancellor in 1885.

He provided financial support to the Bristol Clergy Daughters' School, Henry Martyn Hall, Cambridge, and purchased the livings of 23 parishes to enable him to further the appointment of Evangelical clergy in the Church of England.

== Personal life and family ==
Peache married Julia Augusta Cox (1823-1890) in 1850, and together they had four sons and three daughters. In 1869 he purchased land in Layer Marney near Colchester, and in 1879 he and his sister became Lord and Lady of the Manor there.
