= John Marney, 2nd Baron Marney =

Member of the Parliament of England

John Marney, 2nd Baron Marney (by 1485 – 27 April 1525) of Layer Marney, Essex was an English Member of Parliament and Governor of Rochester Castle.

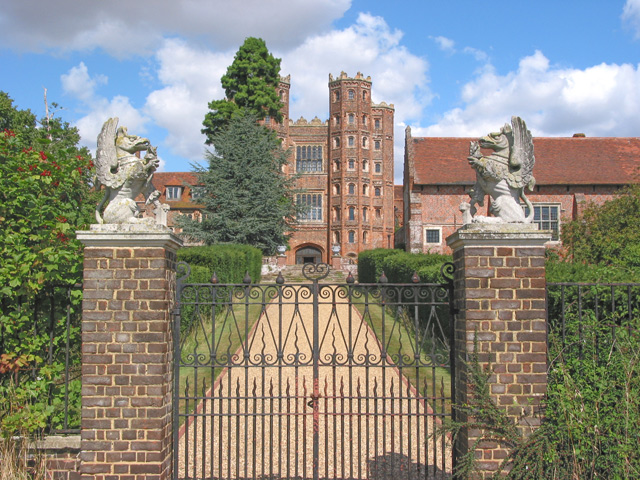
Layer Marney Tower

He was the son of Henry Marney, 1st Baron Marney of Layer Marney and educated in the law at Lincoln's Inn. He succeeded his father in 1523 to the barony and his unfinished house of Layer Marney Tower.

He was appointed keeper of Rochester Castle, Kent for life on 18 May 1509.

He served under his father in the French campaign of 1513 and was present at Henry VIII’s meetings with the French King at the Field of Cloth of Gold. He was an Esquire of the Body to Henry VIII and was knighted in 1513.

He is believed to have been a Member of Parliament for Essex in 1523, following his father, but was elevated to the House of Lords soon afterwards.

He died at an early age in 1525 only two years after his father. He had married twice:

1) Christian, the sole daughter and heiress of Sir Roger Newburgh of East Lulworth, Dorset.

- Catherine married Thomas Poynings, 1st Baron Poynings.
- Elizabeth married Thomas Howard, 1st Viscount Howard of Bindon.

2) Bridget, the daughter of Sir William Waldegrave of Smallbridge, Suffolk, the widow of William Findern of Little Horkesley, Essex.

With no male heirs, the barony became extinct.
