= Wimbledon Cup (disambiguation) =

The Wimbledon Cup is a National Rifle Association of America trophy.

Wimbledon Cup may refer to:

- Wimbledon Cup (Falkland Islands), Falklands Islands Rifle Association trophy.
- Wimbledon Cup (croquet), World Croquet Federation trophy.

== See also ==
- The Championships, Wimbledon
