= Emmanuel Church, Wimbledon =

Coordinates: 51.42305°N 0.21723°W

Emmanuel Church
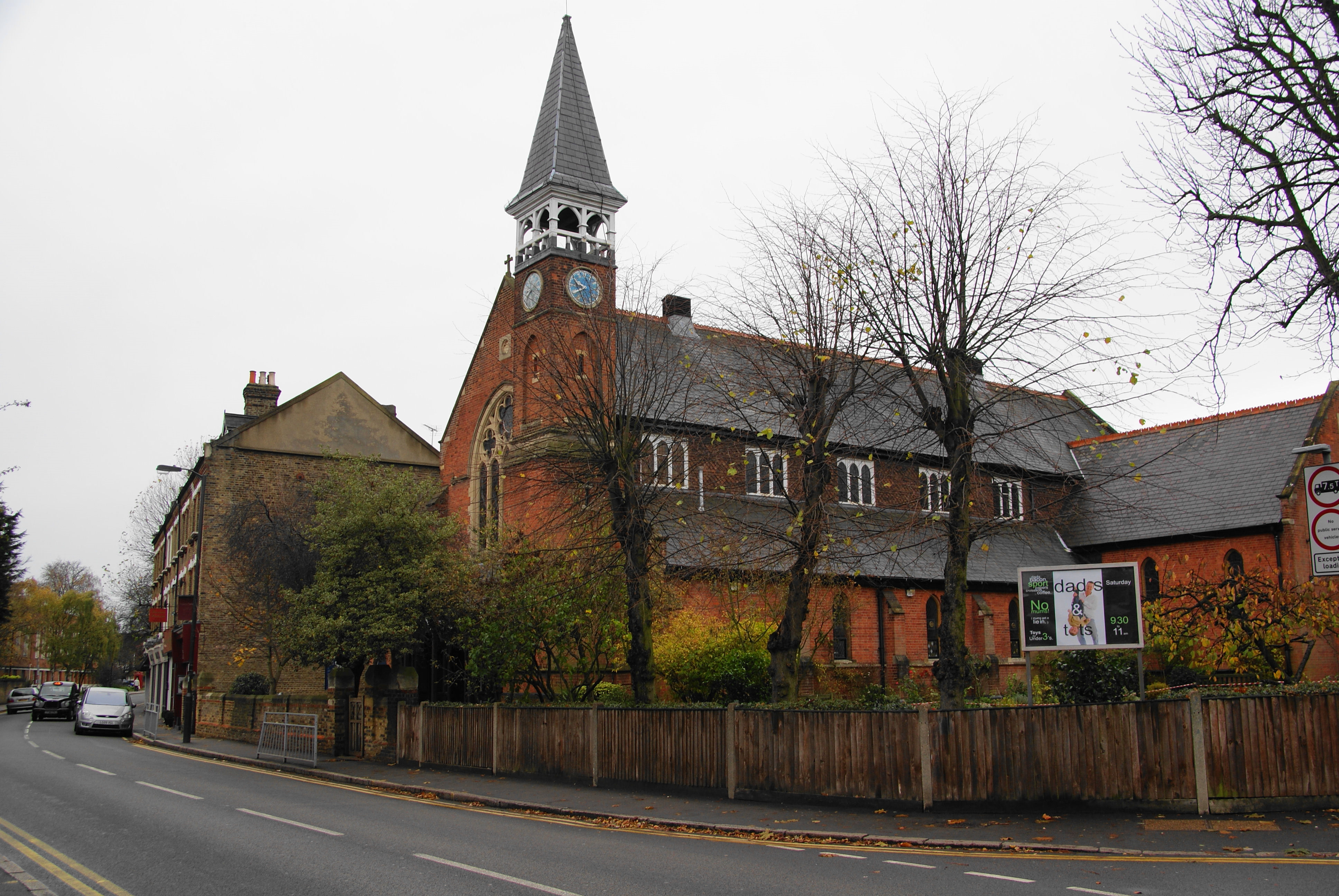
- Emmanuel Church
- Denomination: Church of England
- Churchmanship: Conservative Evangelical
- Website: emmanuelwimbledon.org.uk

History
- Dedication: Emmanuel

Clergy
- Bishop: The Rt Revd Rob Munro (EEO)

Emmanuel Church is a proprietary chapel of the Church of England located on Ridgway in Wimbledon, London.

== Present Day ==
In 2019, reports emerged alleging that Jonathan Fletcher, the church's minister from 1982 until his retirement in 2012, had engaged in abusive behaviour. Fletcher's permission to officiate in the Church of England had previously been removed by the Bishop of Southwark in 2017. In May 2026 a trial of the facts found eight acts of indecent assault to have taken place between 1973 and 1999.
