= Lighthouse and naval vessel urban legend =

Story about a fictional collision course at sea

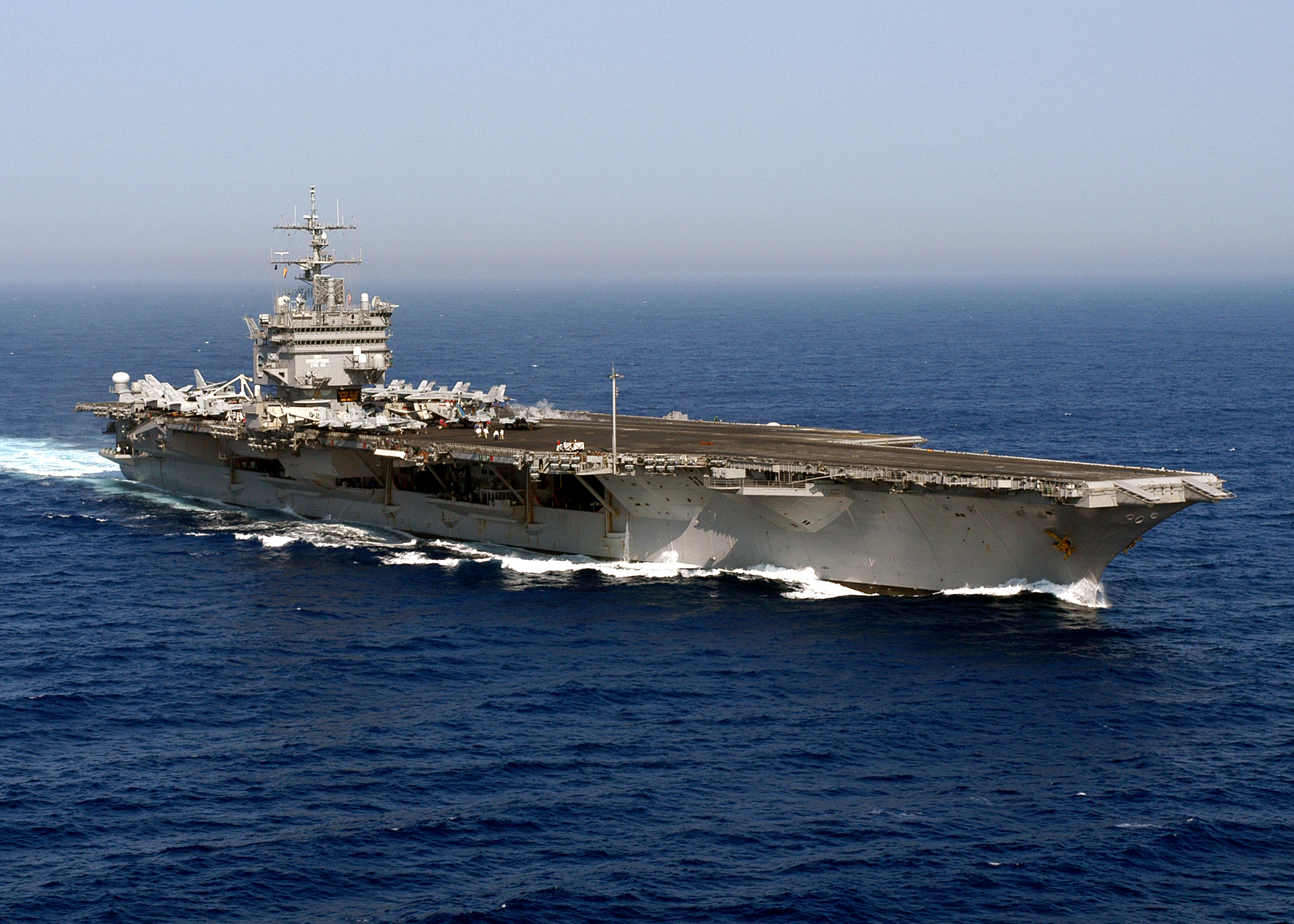
The USS Enterprise, a large warship of the U.S. Navy

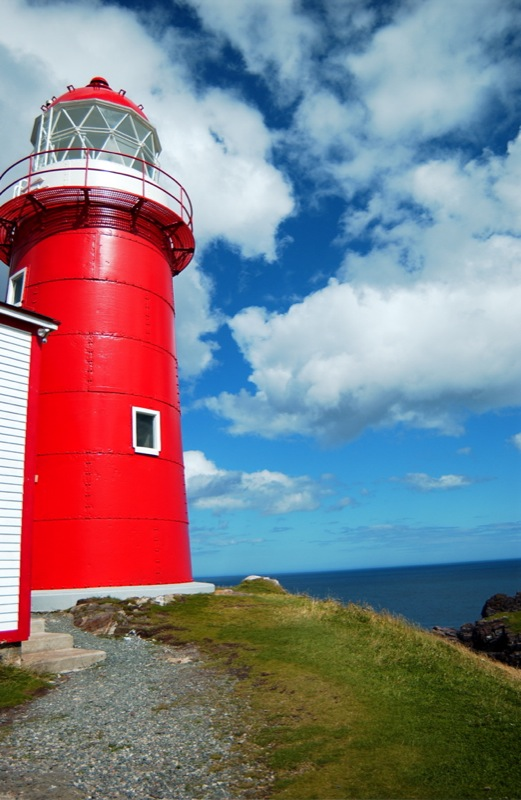
A Canadian lighthouse

The lighthouse and naval vessel urban legend describes an encounter between a large naval ship and what at first appears to be another vessel, with which the ship is on a collision course. The naval vessel, usually identified as of the United States Navy or the United Kingdom's Royal Navy and generally described as a battleship or aircraft carrier, requests that the other ship change course. The other party, generally identified as Canadian or often Irish and occasionally Spanish, responds that the naval vessel should change course, whereupon the captain of the naval vessel reiterates the demand, identifying himself and the ship he commands and sometimes making threats. This elicits the response "I'm a lighthouse. Your call." or something similar, a punchline which has become shorthand for the entire anecdote.

It has circulated on the Internet and elsewhere in particular since a 1995 version that was claimed to be a transcript of such a communication released by the office of the U.S. Chief of Naval Operations. There is no evidence that the event actually took place, and the account is implausible. It is thus considered an urban legend, a variation on a joke that dates to at least the 1930s, sometimes referred to as "the lighthouse vs. the carrier" or "the lighthouse vs. the battleship". The U.S. Navy once had a webpage debunking it, although this did not stop the former U.S. Director of National Intelligence Mike McConnell using it as a joke in a 2008 speech. Other speakers have often used it simply as a parable teaching the dangers of inflexibility and self-importance, or the need for situational awareness. In 2004, a Swedish company dramatized it in an award-winning television advertisement.

== Example ==
A commonly circulated version goes thus:

This is the transcript of a radio conversation of a US naval ship with Canadian authorities off the coast of Newfoundland in October, 1995. Radio conversation released by the Chief of Naval Operations 10-10-95.

Americans: Please divert your course 15 degrees to the North to avoid a collision.

Canadians: Recommend you divert YOUR course 15 degrees to the South to avoid a collision.

Americans: This is the Captain of a US Navy ship. I say again, divert YOUR course.

Canadians: No. I say again, you divert YOUR course.

Americans: This is the aircraft carrier USS Lincoln, the second largest ship in the United States' Atlantic fleet. We are accompanied by three destroyers, three cruisers and numerous support vessels. I demand that YOU change your course 15 degrees north, that's one five degrees north, or countermeasures will be undertaken to ensure the safety of this ship.

Canadians: This is a lighthouse. Your call.

Other vessels sometimes named in the transcript include the carriers Enterprise, Coral Sea and Nimitz, and the Missouri, a battleship. The location of the exchange has also sometimes been claimed to be Puget Sound along the northwestern coast of the U.S. state of Washington, or off the coast of North Carolina, some other times the lighthouse is located at Cape Finisterre in Spain. The Spanish version expands the joke by having the lighthouse keeper respond to the aircraft carrier's inventory of the fleet by saying he's accompanied by "our dog, our food, two beers, and a canary that's currently asleep." Some versions relocate it to the Irish or Scottish coasts; in the former case the ship is sometimes identified as British, with the conversation taking place off the coast of County Kerry, Ireland, in 1998. There is sometimes an additional line of dialogue where the lighthouse keeper tells the ship captain he is a Seaman First Class before the final exchange. The prefatory information sometimes notes it was released in response to a request under the Freedom of Information Act, or names Jeremy Boorda, the incumbent Chief of Naval Operations on the stated date.

== Debunking ==
The Virginian-Pilot, the daily newspaper in Norfolk, Virginia, a city with a large naval presence, investigated the story after it had begun circulating extensively on and off the Internet in 1995. A spokesman for the Atlantic Fleet called it "a totally bogus story". Boorda's office said it had not released any such transcript on the date in question. And not only was the story an old one, the ships commonly named in it were mostly either out of service by 1995 (the Coral Sea, for example, had been scrapped two years before) or not aircraft carriers.

Other sources the paper consulted found more flaws with the story. A spokesman for the Coast Guard, which operates all American lighthouses, said that they had all long since been automated, so there would have been no keeper to talk to a ship, if the incident had taken place in US waters. He speculated that it had been circulated by members of the Coast Guard to make fun of the Navy.

Four years later, in response to a report that a consultant continued to tell the story at speeches as if it were true, Fast Company talked to Wayne Wheeler, a former Coast Guardsman who was then head of an enthusiasts' group called the US Lighthouse Society. He confirmed that it was an old story, and that in his experience an incident of this type involving lighthouses was highly unlikely:

First, a lighthouse doesn't look anything like a ship. Unless the weather's really foggy—and most versions of the story don't mention fog – you can see a lighthouse from far away as a fixed white light that flashes at a set number of seconds. On the other hand, ships are usually moving and have smaller, colored lights at the fore and aft. There's absolutely no way to mistake one for the other.

A Canadian lighthouse keeper, Jim Abram of British Columbia, agreed. "I've been lighthouse keeping for 21 years, ... and no one's ever thought that I was in anything but a lighthouse."

The Military Officers Association of America (MOAA) calls it "easily believable if you are not familiar with how the Navy operates or simple things such as GPS." In addition to the historical inaccuracies with most of the ships named, the organization notes on its blog the extreme improbability that an aircraft carrier's crew would not realize they were off the coast of a landmass such as Newfoundland. The MOAA claimed, in 2009, to receive it in forwarded email an average of three times a day. "[After] fifty times the only interesting part about it is to see which details have been changed."

== History ==
The earliest known version of the joke appeared in a single-panel cartoon in the London weekly tabloid The Humorist, and was reproduced by the Canadian newspaper The Drumheller Review in 1931. It showed two men standing by their rails, shouting through megaphones:

Skipper: Where are you going with your blinking ship?

The Other: "This isn't a blinking ship. It's a lighthouse!"

In August 1934, the London weekly Answers, founded by Alfred Harmsworth in 1888, expanded the cartoon into a humorous anecdote, which was reprinted on both sides of the Atlantic. This version read:

There was a dense summer fog and the officer on the bridge was becoming more and more exasperated. As he leaned over the side of the bridge trying to pierce the gloom, he saw a hazy figure leaning on a rail a few yards from his ship.

He almost choked.

"What do you think you're doing with your blinking ship?" he roared. "Don't you know the rules of the sea?

"This ain't no blinkin' ship, guv'nor," said a quiet voice; "this 'ere's a light'ouse!"

Variants appeared in humor books and periodicals over the next several decades. In 1943, Raphael Tuck & Sons issued a postcard version, with an illustration of the prow of an ocean liner and passing a uniformed man at the rail of a similar object: "Where the ell are you going on your perishin' ship? / This ain't no ship, it's a lighthouse!"

Steven Covey told his own version in his 1989 bestseller The Seven Habits of Highly Effective People, and Covey in turn cited an issue of Proceedings published two years earlier. Isaac Asimov included it in a 1992 humor anthology.

Since 1995, the story continues to be told, albeit with some awareness that it is probably fictional. In 2004 Silva compass, a Swedish maker of marine navigational equipment, dramatized it in a television ad called "The Captain". Its version was set in the Irish Sea, with the ship called the USS Montana and an Irish lighthouse keeper. The advertisement, filmed in English with Swedish subtitles, won a Bronze Lion at that year's Cannes Lions International Advertising Festival.

Four years later, in 2008, retired Admiral Mike McConnell, then United States Director of National Intelligence, used the anecdote at the beginning of a speech at Johns Hopkins University. He insisted it was a true story. "I was in the signals intelligence business where you listen to the people talk and so on", he told his listeners beforehand. "This is true. It's an actual recording." When he was later questioned on this, a spokesman said those statements were meant merely to set the audience up. "It's a technique—comedians use it all the time to get the audience to buy in".

== Interpretations ==
Most commentators who have used it in speeches or books point to it as Mikkelson does, "a lesson in the unimportance of self-importance". Felix Dennis, in whose retelling the story, represented as true, takes place off the coast of British Columbia, calls it his "favorite story about the 'infallibility' of power". He comments:

Oh, boy. Naturally that officer of the watch can never have lived it down. He will be nicknamed "Your Call" or "Lighthouse" until the day he retires. All those years of saluting and keeping his nose to the grindstone destroyed in moments, because he believed the sun shone out of his backside.

Others, particularly those writing about management for business audiences, see it as demonstrating the need for flexibility. Barry Maher calls the intractability of some listeners the Abraham Lincoln Syndrome after the ship named in his version of the anecdote, which he also represents as true. "When the person you're dealing with refuses to let you go where you want to go, divert your course", he advises salespeople, echoing the language in the story. "Smashing into lighthouses is not a successful navigational strategy—no matter how pushy those lighthouses might be." Within a marital context, Gary Smalley uses it to advise husbands trying to reconcile with their wives that "like the navy captain's attempts to manipulate the lighthouse, your attempts to control the situation could cause your wife to become an immovable rock and resent you more deeply".

Another interpretation of the story emphasizes situational awareness. The media consultant Phil Cooke tells the story, conceding that it is fictional, and uses it to demonstrate the importance of the research he reads, and knowing one's audience in particular. "We're blind unless we know who we're talking to." "[W]hile it is [the captain']s ship, it's most definitely not his ocean" writes Russ Linden, a columnist at Governing, of the lesson offered.

Some speakers think the anecdote is an overused cliché. Alan Stevens, president of the Global Speakers Federation, noted that Covey was still using it in speeches in 2010, and reported that the same week he heard him use it, a client emailed him that two speakers at a political event she attended had used it. He tells those giving speeches to avoid not only the lighthouse story, but the boiling frog story and the story about a young boy throwing beached starfish back into the sea. "They may have happened once, but they won't have happened to the storyteller. What's worse, they are used so often, they have lost their impact." They should instead follow his example and tell stories of things that actually happened to them or that they did themselves.

There are similar parallels found in the "Empty Boat" parable in the Daoist text Zhuangzi.

== See also ==
- Elbow of Cross Ledge Light, a New Jersey lighthouse that was hit by a ship in 1953
- List of Internet phenomena
- Moreton Bay Pile Light, an Australian lighthouse twice hit by ships
- Plover Scar Lighthouse, an English lighthouse that was badly damaged in a collision with a cargo ship in 2016
