= Boultbee =

Boultbee may refer to:

- Alfred Boultbee (1828–1901), Canadian politician
- John Boultbee (artist) (1753–1812)
- John Boultbee (explorer) (1759–1854)
- John Boultbee (sport administrator) (born 1950), Australian sports administrator
- Thomas Pownall Boultbee (1818–1884), English clergyman
- Gardner Boultbee (1907–1980), Canadian sailor
