= Susan Gillingham =

British academic, theologian, and Anglican deacon (born 1951)

The Reverend Canon Susan Gillingham
- Born: 1951 (age 74–75)
- Other names: Susan E. Gillingham; S. E. Gillingham
- Citizenship: United Kingdom
- Awards: Oxford DD (2015)

Academic background
- Education: St John's College, Nottingham; University of Nottingham; University of Exeter; Keble College, Oxford
- Thesis: Personal piety in the study of the psalms: A reassessment (1987)

Academic work
- Discipline: Theology
- Sub-discipline: Hebrew Bible; Psalms; Jewish history
- Institutions: Worcester College, Oxford; Faculty of Theology and Religion, University of Oxford

Susan E. Gillingham (born 1951) is a British theologian, academic, and Anglican deacon. She specialises in the Hebrew Bible, the Psalms, and Jewish history from the Israelites to the Second Temple. She has been Fellow and Tutor in theology at Worcester College, Oxford since 1995, and was Professor of the Hebrew Bible at the University of Oxford from 2014 to 2019. She is the first British woman to have been awarded a Doctor of Divinity (DD) degree by the University of Oxford.

== Early life and education ==
Gillingham was born in 1951. She studied theology at St John's College, Nottingham, an Anglican theological college, where she was its first female student. The college's degree are validated by the University of Nottingham, and so she graduated with a Bachelor of Theology (BTh) degree from Nottingham in 1973. She undertook postgraduate study at the University of Exeter and graduated with a Master of Arts (MA) degree in 1980. She then undertook postgraduate research at Keble College, Oxford, and graduated from the University of Oxford with a Doctor of Philosophy (DPhil) degree in 1987. Her doctoral thesis was titled "Personal piety in the study of the psalms: A reassessment".

== Academic career ==
Gillingham specialises in the Hebrew Bible, the Book of Psalms, and Jewish history from the Israelites to the Second Temple. She has written a number of books about the Psalms and also two books about biblical studies.

In 1995, Gillingham was elected a Fellow and Tutor in theology at Worcester College, Oxford. On 1 October 1999, she was appointed a lecturer in theology at the University of Oxford. She was later promoted to Reader in Old Testament. In November 2014, she was awarded a Title of Distinction as Professor of the Hebrew Bible in the Faculty of Theology and Religion. She retired in 2019 and was granted the title of professor emeritus in the Faculty of Theology and Religion and became a senior research fellow at Worcester College.

== Christian ministry ==
Gillingham is an active member of the Church of England. She began her ministry as a Licensed Lay Minister (also known as a reader). She was ordained to the permanent diaconate on 30 June 2018. She is attached to St Barnabas Church, Oxford, and Worcester College Chapel. Since October 2018, she has also served as canon theologian of Exeter Cathedral.

== Honours ==
On 1 August 2015, Gillingham was awarded a Doctor of Divinity (DD) degree by the University of Oxford. The DD is Oxford's highest degree and she is the first British woman to have been awarded it. The work submitted for the degree has to "constitute an original contribution to the advancement of theological knowledge of such substance and distinction as to give the candidate an authoritative status in this branch of learning".

== Private life ==
Sue Gillingham is married to Dick Smethurst, a retired Oxford economist, and former provost of Worcester College, Oxford.

== Selected works ==
- Gillingham, Susan (1994). The poems and psalms of the Hebrew Bible. Oxford: Oxford University Press. ISBN 978-0192132420.
- Gillingham, Susan (1998). One Bible, many voices: different approaches to biblical studies. London: SPCK. ISBN 978-0281048861.
- Gillingham, Susan (2002). The image, the depths and the surface: multivalent approaches to biblical study. London: Sheffield Academic Press. ISBN 978-1841272979.
- Gillingham, Susan (2008). Psalms through the centuries: Volume One. Malden, MA: Blackwell Publisher. ISBN 978-0631218555.
- Gillingham, Susan, ed. (2013). Jewish and Christian approaches to the Psalms: conflict and convergence. Oxford: Oxford University Press. ISBN 978-0199699544.
- Gillingham, Susan (2013). A journey of two psalms: the reception of Psalms 1 and 2 in Jewish and Christian tradition. Oxford: Oxford University Press. ISBN 978-0199652419.
