= John Boultbee =

John Boultbee may refer to:

- John Boultbee (explorer) (1799–1854), explorer of New Zealand
- John Boultbee (sport administrator) (born 1950), Australian sport administrator
- John Boultbee (artist) (1753–1812), English painter of equestrian and other sporting subjects
