= List of shipwrecks in February 1850 =

The list of shipwrecks in February 1850 includes ships sunk, foundered, grounded, or otherwise lost during February 1850.

== 1 February ==
List of shipwrecks: 1 February 1850
Ship	State	Description
Berkshire	United Kingdom	The ship ran aground off Wellington, New Zealand. She was on a voyage from London to Wellington. She was refloated but drove ashore. She was again refloated and taken in to Wellington in a severely damaged condition.
Glencairn	United Kingdom	The East Indiaman, a barque, was driven ashore and wrecked at Dungeness, Kent. Her crew were rescued. She was on a voyage from Shanghai, China to London.
James	United Kingdom	The ship ran aground at Dungarvan, County Waterford. She was on a voyage from Porthcawl, Glamorgan to Cork.
Jules Marie	France	The ship was driven ashore at Équihen, Pas-de-Calais. Her crew were rescued. She was on a voyage from Bayonne, Basses-Pyrénées to Dunquerke Nord.
Mary	United Kingdom	The schooner was wrecked on the West Hoyle Bank, in Liverpool Bay. Her crew were rescued by the Point of Ayr Lifeboat. She was on a voyage from the Cameroons to Liverpool. Mary was refloated on 6 February and beached near "Voel Nant", where she subsequently broke up.
Thomas Dempsey	United Kingdom	The ship sprang a leak and was abandoned in the Atlantic Ocean. She was on a voyage from Liverpool to Trinidad.
Wanderer	United Kingdom	The ship ran aground on the Carysfort Reef. She was on a voyage from Jamaica to Liverpool. She was refloated the next day and taken in to Key West, Florida, United States.

== 2 February ==
List of shipwrecks: 2 February 1850
Ship	State	Description
Berendina	Netherlands	The ship departed from Newcastle upon Tyne, Northumberland, United Kingdom for Amsterdam, North Holland. No further trace, presumed foundered with the loss of all hands.
Enterprise	United Kingdom	The ship was driven ashore in Carnarvon Bay. She was on a voyage from Newport, Monmouthshire to Liverpool, Lancashire. She was refloated on 1 March and taken in to Holyhead, Anglesey.
Havanne	France	The ship was driven ashore at wrecked on the coast of "Cataret". She was on a voyage from Charleston, South Carolina, United States to Havre de Grâce, Seine-Inférieure.
Jane	United Kingdom	The ship was abandoned in the North Sea 18 nautical miles (33 km) off the mouth of the River Tees. Her crew were rescued. She was on a voyage from London to the River Tyne.
Josephine	France	The ship was driven ashore and wrecked west of Newhaven, Sussex, United Kingdom. Her crew were rescued. She was on a voyage from the Île d'Oléron, Charente-Maritime to Abbeville, Somme.
Julie and Marie	France	The ship was driven ashore at Boulogne, Pas-de-Calais. She was on a voyage from Cette, Hérault to Dunkirk, Nord.
Lima Packet	United Kingdom	The ship was driven ashore in St. George's Bay, Ottoman Lebanon.
Minerva	France	The ship was driven ashored at Ambleteuse, Pas-de-Calais. Her crew were rescued. She was on a voyage from Pernambuco, Brazil to Havre de Grâce, Seine-Inférieure.
Requiter	United Kingdom	The ship was driven ashore and wrecked at Tripoli, Ottoman Tripolitania.
Temistocle	Kingdom of the Two Sicilies	The ship was driven ashore near Brindisi. She was on a voyage from Brindisi to Alexandria, Egypt.
Voltigeur	United Kingdom	The ship was driven ashore near Brindisi. She was on a voyage from Brindisi to Marseille, Bouches-du-Rhône.

== 3 February ==
List of shipwrecks: 3 February 1850
Ship	State	Description
Alexandre	France	The ship ran aground on the Nash Sands, in the Bristol Channel. She was on a voyage from Cardiff, Glamorgan, United Kingdom to Paimpol, Côtes-du-Nord. She was refloated and put in to Newport, Monmouthshire, United Kingdom.
Mary Ann and Jane	United Kingdom	The sloop sprang a leak off the Hale Sand, in the North Sea off the coast of Lincolnshire. Her crew were rescued by Cresswell (United Kingdom). Mary Ann and Jane was on a voyage from Seaham, County Durham to Wisbech, Cambridgeshire.
Swift	United Kingdom	The brig foundered in the North Sea 6 nautical miles (11 km) north east of Scarborough, Yorkshire. Her captain was rescued by a pilot's coble. The crew took to a boat, they were rescued by the brig Royal Oak (United Kingdom).

== 4 February ==
List of shipwrecks: 4 February 1850
Ship	State	Description
Ann and Jane	United Kingdom	The ship sprang a leak and sank off the mouth of the Humber. She was on a voyage from Seaham, County Durham to Wisbech, Cambridgeshire.
Arrow	United Kingdom	The ship was wrecked at St. Bees Head, Cumberland. Her crew were rescued. She was on a voyage from Whitehaven, Cumberland to Dublin.
Catherine	United Kingdom	The sloop was wrecked on the Patches, in Carnarvon Bay with the loss of all hands. She was on a voyage from Newport, Monmouthshire to Mochras, Caernarfonshire.
Marie	France	The ship was lost off Camaret-sur-Mer, Finistère. She was on a voyage from Bordeaux, Gironde to Saint-Brieuc, Côtes-du-Nord.
Vanguard	United Kingdom	The barque was wrecked on a reef off Crooked Island, Bahamas. Her crew were rescued by Thames (United Kingdom).

== 5 February ==
List of shipwrecks: 5 February 1850
Ship	State	Description
Alice William	United Kingdom	The schooner was wrecked at Caernarvon. Her crew were rescued. She was on a voyage from Charlestown, Cornwall to Liverpool, Lancashire.
Coldstream	United Kingdom	The ship was wrecked near Havana, Cuba. She was on a voyage from Liverpool to Havana.
Edward Auld	United Kingdom	The ship was driven ashore on Islay, Inner Hebrides. She was on a voyage from the Clyde to Londonderry.
Elizabeth	United Kingdom	The ship was driven ashore at Lancing, Sussex.
Jessie Cook	United Kingdom	The smack was driven ashore on Islay. She was on a voyage from Coultersay, Islay to Glasgow, Renfrewshire.
Kate	United Kingdom	The brig was driven ashore at Walsoorden, Zeeland, Netherlands. She was on a voyage from Antwerp, Belgium to London.
Killury	United Kingdom	The smack was driven ashore on Islay.
Lady Fife	United Kingdom	The smack was driven ashore at Ramsey, Isle of Man. She was on a voyage from Dublin to Glasgow, Renfrewshire.
Maria	United Kingdom	The ship was driven ashore at Hoylake, Lancashire with the loss of all hands. She was refloated on 12 February and taken in to Liverpool.
Mary	United Kingdom	The ship foundered on the Greengrounds, in the Bristol Channel. Her crew were rescued.
Mary	United Kingdom	The ship was driven ashore at Dinas Dinlle, Caernarfonshire. Her crew were rescued.
Olive Branch	United Kingdom	The ship ran aground on the West Hoyle Bank, in Liverpool Bay. She was on a voyage from Newry, County Antrim to Liverpool. She was refloated and beached at Seacombe, Cheshire.
Orn	Hamburg	The ship was wrecked on the Punta Reefs, off Havana. She was on a voyage from Hamburg to Havana.
Pilot	(United Kingdom of Great Britain and Ireland) New South Wales	The schooner was wrecked on Knobby's Reef. Her crew were rescued. She was on a voyage from Newcastle to Sydney.
Resolution	United Kingdom	The ship was driven ashore at Morfa, Glamorgan. She broke up on 11 February.
Sarah	United Kingdom	The West Indiaman, a barque, was presumed to have foundered off Margate, Kent with the loss of all on board. She was on a voyage from Jamaica to London.
Swift	United Kingdom	The brig was driven ashore on Islay. She was on a voyage from Islay to Whitehaven, Cumberland. She was refloated on 12 June and sailed to Whitehaven for repairs.
Witch	United Kingdom	The paddle steamer was driven into a coal hulk then into the paddle steamer Dryad (United Kingdom) and severely damaged at Woolwich, Kent.

== 6 February ==
List of shipwrecks: 6 February 1850
Ship	State	Description
Agnes	United Kingdom	The schooner ran aground on the Boulmer Rocks, Northumberland. She was refloated and towed in to Warkworth, Northumberland.
Akbar	United Kingdom	The quarantine hulk was driven ashore at Seacombe, Cheshire.
Albert	Sweden	The schooner ran aground on the Seesand, in the North Sea. Her crew were rescued. She was on a voyage from Cádiz, Spain to Hamburg. She broke up in early March.
Alexandrine	France	The chasse-marée was driven into the schooner Hero and sank in Tor Bay. Her crew were rescued.
Alpha	United Kingdom	The schooner sank at the Mumbles, Glamorgan. She was refloated on 15 February.
Amelia	United Kingdom	The ship was driven ashore and sank at Ilfracombe, Devon. She was on a voyage from Cardiff, Glamorgan to Portsmouth, Hampshire.
Ann	United Kingdom	The flat was driven ashore near the Plover Scar Lighthouse, Lancashire. She was on a voyage from Peel, Isle of Man to Preston, Lancashire.
Anne	United Kingdom	The schooner was driven ashore at Porthdinllaen, Caernarfonshire.
Anne	United Kingdom	The ship was driven ashore and severely damaged at "Roch Port". She was on a voyage from Workington, Cumberland to Dublin.
Anne and Catherine	United Kingdom	The schooner was driven ashore at Porthdinllaen.
Arethusa	United Kingdom	The schooner was driven ashore at Porthdinllaen. She was on a voyage from Liverpool, Lancashire to Bristol, Gloucestershire. She was refloated on 8 February.
Ariel	United Kingdom	The schooner was driven at Speeton, Yorkshire. She was on a voyage from Newcastle upon Tyne, Northumberland to Spalding, Lincolnshire. She was refloated with assistance from the lugger John Wesley (United Kingdom) and taken in to Bridlington, Yorkshire.
Atlantic	United Kingdom	The ship ran aground on the Rounding Middle Sand, in The Wash. She was refloated but consequently sank. Her crew were rescued. She was on a voyage from Sunderland, County Durham to King's Lynn, Norfolk.
Carrywell	United Kingdom	The ship was driven ashore south of the Heads of Ayr.
Catherine	United Kingdom	The ship was driven ashore near "Rock Port". She was refloated on 28 February and towed in to Belfast, County Antrim.
Chance	United Kingdom	The ship was driven ashore and sank at Harwich, Essex.
Coquette	United Kingdom	The ship driven ashore at Pill, Somerset. She was on a voyage from Bristol to Trinidad. She was refloated.
Cornwall	United Kingdom	The steamship was driven ashore at Bristol.
Diana	United Kingdom	The steamship ran aground on the Burbo Bank, in Liverpool Bay. All on board were rescued by a lifeboat. She was on a voyage from Liverpool to Waterford. Diana was refloated on 9 February and taken in to Liverpool.
Duchess of Cleveland	United Kingdom	The ship was driven ashore and wrecked at Runton, Norfolk. She was on a voyage from Hartlepool, County Durham to London.
Duchess of Kent	(United Kingdom of Great Britain and Ireland) Isle of Man	The smack was driven against the quayside and sank at Liverpool. Her crew were rescued. She was on a voyage from the Isle of Man to Liverpool.
Duchess of Sutherland	United Kingdom	The ship was driven ashore and wrecked at Runton, Norfolk. Her crew survived.
Earl of Strathmore	United Kingdom	The brig sprang a leak and was abandoned in the North Sea 25 nautical miles (46 km) off Lowestoft, Suffolk. Her crew were rescued by Thomas and Betsy (United Kingdom).
Edward	United Kingdom	The smack was driven ashore and damaged in Tor Bay. She was on a voyage from Plymouth, Devon to Bridport, Dorset. She was refloated on 8 February.
Edward Stanley	(United Kingdom of Great Britain and Ireland) New Zealand	The schooner was wrecked at Croixelles Harbour. Her crew were rescued.
Galatea	United Kingdom	The ship was sighted off Dungeness, Kent whilst on a voyage from London to São Miguel Island, Azores. No further trace, presumed foundered with the loss of all hands.
Good Intent	United Kingdom	The schooner was driven out to sea crewless from Pwllheli, Caernarfonshire.
Isabella	United Kingdom	The smack was driven ashore and wrecked in Tor Bay. She was on a voyage from Plymouth to Brixham, Devon.
Isle of Arran	United Kingdom	The paddle steamer caught fire at Ardrossan, Ayrshire and was scuttled. She was subsequently raised, repaired and returned to service.
Jacob	France	The full-rigged ship ran aground off Portsmouth, Hampshire, United Kingdom. She was on a voyage from Havre de Grâce, Seine-Inférieure to Havana, Cuba. She was refloated and towed in to Portsmouth by the steam tug Echo (United Kingdom).
Jamaica	United Kingdom	The ship was driven ashore on Whiteforeland Point, Renfrewshire. She was on a voyage from Glasgow, Renfrewshire to Trinidad.
Jane	United Kingdom	The ship was driven ashore south of the Heads of Ayr.
John P. Whitney	United States	The ship was wrecked in the Victoria Channel off Formby, Lancashire. All 32 people on board took to the boats and were rescued by the tug John Bull (United Kingdom). She was on a voyage from Philadelphia, Pennsylvania to Liverpool.
Jubilee	United Kingdom	The barque was wrecked on the Brest Rocks, off the coast of Ayrshire in Dunure Bay with the loss of five of her crew. She was on a voyage from Troon, Ayrshire to Smyrna, Ottoman Empire.
Levantine	United Kingdom	The steamship ran aground on the North Bank, in Liverpool Bay. She was on her maiden voyage from Glasgow, Renfrewshire to Livorno, Grand Duchy of Tuscany.
Lord Duncan	United Kingdom	The ketch was driven ashore and wrecked at Mawgan Porth, Cornwall with the loss of all hands. She was on a voyage from Newport, Monmouthshire to Dartmouth, Devon.
Margaret	United Kingdom	The barque was wrecked on the Brest Rocks. She was on a voyage from New Orleans, Louisiana, United States to Greenock, Renfrewshire.
Maria	United Kingdom	The ship was driven ashore at Cairnryan, Wigtownshire. She was refloated on 10 February.
Mary	United Kingdom	The ship was driven ashore at Caernarfon. Her crew were rescued. She was on a voyage from Cardiff to Liverpool.
Mary Ann	United Kingdom	The smack was driven ashore 5 nautical miles (9.3 km) north of Barmouth, Caernarfonshire with the loss of all but one of her crew.
Mary McWhinnie	United Kingdom	The ship was wrecked at Laugharne, Carmarthenshire. She was on a voyage from Newport, Monmouthshire to Wilmington, Delaware, United States.
Marys	United Kingdom	The ship ran aground on the Spit Sand, in the North Sea off the coast of Suffolk. She was refloated and taken in to Lowestoft in a leaky condition.
Mary Slone	United Kingdom	The ship was driven ashore at "Crigilt", Anglesey. Her crew were rescued. She was on a voyage from Llanelly, Glamorgan to Newry, County Antrim.
Minerva	United Kingdom	The ship was driven ashore south of the Heads of Ayr.
Narcisso	Ottoman Empire	The ship was driven ashore in the Isles of Scilly, United Kingdom.
Nonpareil	United Kingdom	The ship ran aground on the Middle Bank, in Liverpool Bay. She was on a voyage from São Miguel Island, Azores to Ballina, County Mayo.
Pearl	United Kingdom	The ship ran aground on the Barber Sand, in the North Sea off the coast of Norfolk. She was on a voyage from London to Portsoy, Aberdeenshire.
Pilot	United Kingdom	The flat sank in the River Mersey. All on board were rescued.
Portia	United Kingdom	The brig was driven ashore and wrecked at the Gynn, Blackpool, Lancashire. Her eleven crew were rescued by rocket apparatus. She was on a voyage from Liverpool to Troon and Quebec City, Province of Canada, British North America. She was refloated on 27 February and towed in to Fleetwood, Lancashire.
Principe Alberto	Spain	The brig was driven ashore at Boscastle, Cornwall. Her twelve crew were rescued by the Coast Guard using Dennett's rocket apparatus. She was on a voyage from Glasgow to Havana, Cuba.
Resolution	United Kingdom	The ship was driven ashore near "Morfar", Glamorgan.
Richard	United Kingdom	The ship foundered off the Sunk Lightship ( Trinity House). Her crew were rescued. She was on a voyage from Rochester, Kent to Sunderland.
Sailors' Home	United Kingdom	The schooner foundered in Liverpool Bay. Her crew were rescued by the New Brighton Lifeboat. She was refloated on 8 February and taken in to Liverpool.
San Spiridone	Greece	The brig was driven ashore and wrecked on Hare Island, County Galway, United Kingdom.
Scotswood	United Kingdom	The schooner was run down and sunk in the Atlantic Ocean (45°00′N 9°26′W) by the barque Ivanhoe (United Kingdom). Her crew were rescued.
Sedulous	United Kingdom	The schooner was driven ashore at Porthdinllaen.
Speculation	(United Kingdom of Great Britain and Ireland) Guernsey	The ship was driven ashore and sank at Blakeney, Norfolk. Her five crew were rescued. She was on a voyage from South Shields, County Durham to Guernsey.
Thetis	United Kingdom	The ship was wrecked at Cardigan with the loss of eleven of her thirteen crew. She was on a voyage from Newport, Monmouthshire to Limerick.
Victoria	United Kingdom	The smack was driven ashore at Abererch, Caernarfonshire. Her crew were rescued.
Victoria	United Kingdom	The ship was driven ashore south of the Heads of Ayr.
Victoria and Albert	United Kingdom	The schooner was damaged by fire at Dungarvan, County Waterford.
Vine	United Kingdom	The ship ran aground on the Herd Sand, in the North Sea off the coast of County Durham. She was refloated and beached at South Shields.
Water Nymph	United Kingdom	The schooner was wrecked at the entrance to Loch Ryan with the loss of all six people on board.
William	United Kingdom	The smack was driven ashore and wrecked near Morte Point, Devon with the loss of all but one of her crew.

== 7 February ==
List of shipwrecks: 7 February 1850
Ship	State	Description
Activ	Russia	The ship was driven ashore and wrecked 6 nautical miles (11 km) east of Calais, France. She was on a voyage from Hartlepool, County Durham, United Kingdom to Odesa.
Africa	France	The brig was driven ashore at West-Cappel, Nord. Her crew were rescued. She was on a voyage from Hartlepool to Nantes, Loire-Inférieure.
Alice Kilham	United Kingdom	The ship ran aground and sank at Caernarfon. Her crew were rescued. She was on a voyage from Charleston, South Carolina, United States to Liverpool, Lancashire.
Ebenezer Muston	United Kingdom	The ship struck a sunken rock in the Minch and was damaged. She was on a voyage from Londonderry to Blyth, Northumberland.
Elizabeth	United Kingdom	The ship was driven ashore and damaged at Shoreham-by-Sea, Sussex.
Harlington	United Kingdom	The brig was abandoned and sank in the North Sea. Her crew were rescued by a French fishing smack. She was on a voyage from Southampton, Hampshire to Sunderland, County Durham.
Jane and Margaret	United Kingdom	The ship was driven ashore on Neuwerk. She was on a voyage from Grangemouth, Stirlingshire to Hamburg.
John	United Kingdom	The ship sprang a leak and sank in Arklow Bay, County Wicklow.
Lady of the Lake	United Kingdom	The schooner sank off Shoeburyness, Essex. Her crew were rescued.
Lucinda	United Kingdom	The ship was driven ashore at Cayeux-sur-Mer, Somme, France. Her crew were rescued. She was on a voyage from Callao, Peru to London.
Miner	United Kingdom	The ship was wrecked at "Ballydonagur", Isle of Man.
Nelly	United Kingdom	The sloop was driven into the schooner John Knox (United Kingdom) and was then driven ashore in Cartsdyke Bay. Her crew were rescued.
HMS Onyx	Royal Navy	The paddle steamer was driven ashore at Ostend, West Flanders, Belgium. Her passengers were taken off. She was on a voyage from Dover, Kent to Ostend. She was refloated in mid-March.
Quebec	United Kingdom	The ship was in collision with the pilot cutter Guerilla (United Kingdom) and sank at Penzance, Cornwall. She was on a voyage from Swansea, Glamorgan to Genoa, Kingdom of Sardinia.
Sarah	United Kingdom	The ship was driven ashore near Harrington, Cumberland. She was on a voyage from Ramsey, Isle of Man to Whitehaven, Cumberland.
Vulcan	Prussia	The ship was driven onto the Falsterbo Reef, in the Baltic Sea by ice with the loss of a crew member. She was on a voyage from Wisbech, Cambridgeshire, United Kingdom to Memel. She sank the next day.
Waterwitch	United Kingdom	The ship was wrecked at Downan Point, Ayrshire with loss of life.
William and Mary	United Kingdom	The schooner sank off Shoeburyness with the loss of a crew member. She was on a voyage from Gainsborough, Lincolnshire to London.

== 8 February ==
List of shipwrecks: 8 February 1850
Ship	State	Description
Catherine	United Kingdom	The ship was driven ashore at Drigg, Cumberland. She was on a voyage from Dublin to Whitehaven, Cumberland.
Ceres	United Kingdom	The ship was wrecked on the Zeehondenplaat, off the coast of Zeeland, Netherlands. Her crew were rescued. She was on a voyage from Liverpool, Lancashire to Dordrecht, South Holland, Netherlands.
Clauchlouden	United Kingdom	The sloop was driven ashore at Ayr. Her crew were rescued.
Griffin	United Kingdom	The ship was driven ashore east of Dunkirk, Nord, France. She was on a voyage from Hull, Yorkshire to Plymouth, Devon. She had become a wreck by 16 February.
Henry G. Hunt	(United Kingdom of Great Britain and Ireland) Bermuda	The ship was wrecked near Cabo Corrientes, Cuba, Her crew were rescued. She was on a voyage from East Harbour, Bermuda to New Orleans, Louisiana, United States.
Hornsea	United Kingdom	The ship ran aground at Brancaster, Norfolk. She was on a voyage from London to Wisbech, Cambridgeshire. She was refloated and taken in to Wells-next-the-Sea, Norfolk in a leaky condition.
Hull Packet	United Kingdom	The ship was driven ashore and wrecked at Bangor, County Down. She was on a voyage from Troon, Ayrshire to Dublin.
Jane and Margaret	United Kingdom	The ship was driven ashore and damaged on Neuwerk. She was refloated on 10 February and taken in to Cuxhaven.
Louise	France	The ship was driven ashore near Largs, Ayrshire. She was on a voyage from Nantes, Loire-Inférieure to Glasgow, Renfrewshire, United Kingdom.

== 9 February ==
List of shipwrecks: 9 February 1850
Ship	State	Description
Amity	United Kingdom	The schooner was driven ashore and wrecked at Ayr. Her crew were rescued by the Ayr Lifeboat. She was on a voyage from Newcastle upon Tyne, Northumberland to Dublin.
Blacket	United Kingdom	The ship was driven ashore at Cap Gris Nez, Pas-de-Calais, France. Her crew were rescued. She was on a voyage from Southampton, Hampshire to Sunderland, County Durham.
Felisa	Spain	The ship was driven ashore and wrecked at San Sebastián with the loss of eleven lives.
Hector	Belgium	The ship was driven ashore and wrecked at "Welvorden".
Ino	United Kingdom	The ship foundered in the North Sea off Texel, North Holland. Her crew were rescued. The wreck drove ashore on Schiermonnikoog, Friesland, Netherland the next day.
Margaret	United Kingdom	The ship was driven ashore at Ardrossan, Ayrshire.
Minerva	United States	The ship was wrecked on Fire Island, New York.
Nimble	United Kingdom	The schooner was destroyed by fire in Ballyhenry Bay. She was on a voyage from Glasgow, Renfrewshire to Dublin.
Portly	United Kingdom	The ship foundered in the Mediterranean Sea 85 nautical miles (157 km) south of Sapientza, Greece with the loss of a crew member. She was on a voyage from Alexandria, Egypt to the Clyde.
Two Friends	United Kingdom	The ship was damaged and sank at Bridlington, Yorkshire. She was on a voyage from Middlesbrough, Yorkshire to Southwold, Suffolk.

== 10 February ==
List of shipwrecks: 10 February 1850
Ship	State	Description
Alvadio	United Kingdom	The schooner sank off the Cork Sand, in the North Sea off the coast of Suffolk.
Ceres	Denmark	The ship was wrecked on Anholt. Her crew were rescued. She was on a voyage from Cette, Hérault, France to Copenhagen.
Charles Buchan	United Kingdom	The ship was wrecked at the mouth of the Rio Grande. Her crew were rescued. She was on a voyage from Liverpool, Lancashire to the Rio Grande.
Dream	United Kingdom	The schooner was wrecked on the Ascension Point Reef. Her crew were rescued. She was on a voyage from New Orleans, Louisiana, United States to Belize City, British Honduras.
Garonne	France	The ship was driven ashore at Swansea, Glamorgan, United Kingdom. She was on a voyage from Swansea to Plymouth, Devon, United Kingdom.
James	United Kingdom	The ship ran aground on the Batten Reef, off the coast of Devon. She was on a voyage from Marseille, Bouches-du-Rhône, France to Plymouth, Devon.
Liberty	United Kingdom	The ship ran aground on the Burbo Bank, in Liverpool Bay. Her crew were rescued by the Hoylake Lifeboat. She was on a voyage from Wexford to Liverpool. She was refloated with assistance from the fishing boat Happy Return (United Kingdom and taken in to Liverpool.
Newcastle Trader	United Kingdom	The ship foundered in the Dogger Bank. Her crew were rescued. She was on a voyage from London to the River Tyne.
Thomas	United Kingdom	The ship was wrecked at New Calabar. Her crew were rescued. She was on a voyage from New Calabar to Liverpool.

== 11 February ==
List of shipwrecks: 11 February 1850
Ship	State	Description
Albion	United Kingdom	The ship was driven ashore and severely damaged at Harrington, Cumberland. She was on a voyage from Dublin to Harrington.
Britannia	United Kingdom	The ship was driven ashore at Beaumaris, Anglesey. She was refloated on 13 February.
British Queen	United Kingdom	The sloop was driven ashore at Spurn Point, Yorkshire.
City of London	United Kingdom	The ship departed from Colombo, Ceylon. No further trace, presumed foundered with the loss of all hands.
Ellen	United Kingdom	The sloop was driven ashore crewless near Rhyl, Denbighshire.
Jane and Ellen	United Kingdom	The ship was driven ashore at Wells-next-the-Sea, Norfolk.
Nepaul	United Kingdom	The ship was wrecked on the coast of the Cape Colony with the loss of three of her crew. She was on a voyage from Bombay, India to London.
Newcastle Trader	United Kingdom	The ship was abandoned in the Dogger Bank. Her crew were rescued. She was on a voyage from London to the River Tyne.
Swallow	United Kingdom	The ship sprang a leak and sank in the North Sea off Dimlington, Yorkshire. Her crew survived. She was on a voyage from Sunderland, County Durham to Colchester, Essex.

== 12 February ==
List of shipwrecks: 12 February 1850
Ship	State	Description
Black Prince	United Kingdom	The ship was driven ashore and wrecked at Monkhaven Point, Pembrokeshire. She was on a voyage from Porto, Portugal to Saint John's, Newfoundland, British North America.
Charlotte	United Kingdom	The ship foundered off Ailsa Craig. Her crew were rescued. She was on a voyage from Ardrossan, Ayrshire to Liverpool, Lancashire.
Elizabeth	United Kingdom	The smack was driven ashore and wrecked at Troon, Ayrshire. Her crew were rescued.
Harp	United Kingdom	The ship struck a rock at Lamlash, Isle of Arran and was damaged. She put in to Troon in a leaky condition.
Janet	United Kingdom	The ship foundered in the Firth of Forth 4 nautical miles (7.4 km) south of the Pladda Lighthouse. Her crew survived. She was on a voyage from Ardrossan, Ayrshire to Runcorn, Cheshire.

== 13 February ==
List of shipwrecks: 13 February 1850
Ship	State	Description
Alfred and James	United Kingdom	The ship ran aground off Schouwen, Zeeland, Netherlands. Her crew were rescued. She was on a voyage from Dover, Kent to Rotterdam, South Holland, Netherlands.
Camerton	United Kingdom	The steamship was driven ashore at Hellevoetsluis, Zeeland, Netherlands.
Edouardo	Flag unknown	The ship was driven ashore on the Bank of Achiolu, at the entrance to the Gulf of Burgas. She was on a voyage from Odesa to Falmouth, Cornwall or Queenstown, County Cork, United Kingdom.
Hercule	France	The ship departed from Valparaíso, Chile for San Francisco, Alta California. No further trace, presumed foundered with the loss of all hands.
Hiram	Prussia	The ship was wrecked in the Îles d'Hyères, Var, France. She was on a voyage from Grangemouth, Stirlingshire, United Kingdom to Marseille, Bouches-du-Rhône, France.
Manly	(United Kingdom of Great Britain and Ireland) British North America	The ship was driven ashore and severely damaged at North Sunderland, County Durham.
William Leveret	United Kingdom	The ship was driven ashore at 's-Gravenzande, South Holland. She was on a voyage from Ghent, East Flanders, Belgium to Goole, Yorkshire.

== 14 February ==
List of shipwrecks: 14 February 1850
Ship	State	Description
Agnes	(United Kingdom of Great Britain and Ireland) Guernsey	The ship collided with another vessel and sank in the English Channel off Beachy Head, Sussex. Her crew were rescued.
Alert	United Kingdom	The ship was driven ashore at Rye, Sussex. She was on a voyage from Seaham, County Durham to Rye.
Argo	United Kingdom	The ship was wrecked on the Nash Sand, in the Bristol Channel off the coast of Glamorgan. She was on a voyage from Liverpool, Lancashire to Bristol, Gloucestershire.
Jules et Sophie	France	The ship was wrecked at Cap La Hogue, Manche. Her crew were rescued. She was on a voyage from Campeche, Mexico to Havre de Grâce, Seine-Inférieure.
Quatro Fratelli	Kingdom of the Two Sicilies	The ship was driven ashore near Ramsgate, Kent, United Kingdom. She was on a voyage from Hull, Yorkshire, United Kingdom to Naples. She was refloated and taken in to Ramsgate.
Sarah	United Kingdom	The schooner sank in the English Channel east of Dungeness, Kent. Her crew were rescued. She was on a voyage from Brixham, Devon to Newcastle upon Tyne, Northumberland.
Talisman	United Kingdom	The ship was wrecked on the Inner Knock Sand, in the North Sea with the loss of a crew member. She was on a voyage from London to King's Lynn, Norfolk.

== 15 February ==
List of shipwrecks: 15 February 1850
Ship	State	Description
Arion	United Kingdom	The brig was driven ashore and wrecked at Caernarfon. She was on a voyage from Saint Domingo to Liverpool, Lancashire.
Caesar	Hamburg	The ship ran aground on the Brammer Sand, in the North Sea. She was refloated on 18 February and taken in to Hamburg.
Childe Harold	United Kingdom	The ship was wrecked on Dassen Island, Africa with the loss of her captain.
Eagle	United Kingdom	The ship ran aground on the Trinity Sand, in the North Sea off the coast of Lincolnshire. Her crew were rescued. She was on a voyage from Brancaster, Norfolk to Goole, Yorkshire. She was later refloated and completed her voyage, arriving on 27 February.
First of September	United Kingdom	The ship was holed by ice and sank off Osmussaar, Russia. Her crew were rescued.
Floridian, and Helen	United Kingdom	The barque Floridian collided with the brigantine Helen in the Bay of Biscay. Helen sank immediately with the loss of a crew member. Survivors were rescued by Floridian, which consequently sank the next day. All on board were rescued by the schooner Victoria (United Kingdom). Floridian was on a voyage from Newcastle upon Tyne, Northumberland to Algiers, Algeria. Helen was on a voyage from Lisbon, Portugal to Leith, Lothian.
Jantina	Belgium	The ship was driven ashore near Callantsoog, North Holland, Netherlands. She was on a voyage from Antwerp to London, United Kingdom.
Margaret	Bremen	The ship ran aground on the Eversand, in the North Sea. Her crew were rescued. She was refloated on 19 February.
Venus	United Kingdom	The ship was driven ashore at Portland, Dorset with the loss of two of her crew. She was on a voyage from Teignmouth, Devon to London.
William and Jane	United Kingdom	The ship was wrecked on the Barracene Rocks, Devon.

== 16 February ==
List of shipwrecks: 16 February 1850
Ship	State	Description
Amelia Mulholland	United Kingdom	The ship was wrecked in Algoa Bay. Her crew were rescued.
Flora	United Kingdom	The ship was wrecked on the Goodwin Sands, Kent. Her crew were rescued. She was on a voyage from South Shields, County Durham to Rouen, Seine-Inférieure, France.
Hope	United Kingdom	The brigantine collided with Robert and Betsy (United Kingdom) and foundered off the coast of Essex with the loss of a crew member. Survivors were rescued by Robert and Betsy. Hope was on a voyage from Newcastle upon Tyne, Northumberland to Exeter, Devon.
Mary	United Kingdom	The ship was driven ashore on the coast of Northumberland. She was on a voyage from Hartlepool, County Durham to Grangemouth, Stirlingshire. She was refloated the next day and put in to Warkworth, Northumberland.
Mary Ridgway	United Kingdom	The ship foundered off Quilmes, Argentina. She was on a voyage from Cádiz, Spain to Buenos Aires, Argentina.
Metropolis	United Kingdom	The ship was in collision with the steamship Camerton (United Kingdom) and then ran aground on Scroby Sands, Norfolk. She was on a voyage from Sunderland, County Durham to Hong Kong. She was refloated and taken in to Great Yarmouth, Norfolk in a severely damaged condition.
Rose	United Kingdom	The ship was driven ashore and severely damaged at Berwick upon Tweed, Northumberland. She was on a voyage from Glasgow, Renfrewshire to Berwick upon Tweed.

== 17 February ==
List of shipwrecks: 17 February 1850
Ship	State	Description
Cecrops	United Kingdom	The ship ran aground on St. Catherine's Bank, in the Solent. She was on a voyage from Callao, Peru to Berwick upon Tweed, Northumberland. She was refloated and taken in to Portsmouth, Hampshire.
James White	United Kingdom	The ship ran aground on the Cross Sand, in the North Sea off the coast of Norfolk. She was on a voyage from Hull, Yorkshire to Bombay, India. She was refloated and resumed her voyage.
Mary	United Kingdom	The schooner was abandoned in the Atlantic Ocean. Her crew were rescued by Virginia (United States). She was on a voyage from Wilmington, Delaware, United States to Demerara, British Guiana.
Rising Sun	United Kingdom	The ship was driven ashore at Bideford, Devon.

== 18 February ==
List of shipwrecks: 18 February 1850
Ship	State	Description
Ewart	Belgium	The ship ran aground off Eierland, North Holland, Netherlands. She was on a voyage from Amsterdam, North Holland to Goole, Yorkshire, United Kingdom.
Saelarken	Duchy of Holstein	The ship was in collision with the smack Brothers and Sisters (United Kingdom). She was consequently beached at Harwich, Essex, United Kingdom.
Wolfgang	Kingdom of Hanover	The ship ran aground in the Elbe.

== 19 February ==
List of shipwrecks: 19 February 1850
Ship	State	Description
Augusta	United Kingdom	The ship was driven ashore on Skagen, Denmark. She was on a voyage from Hartlepool, County Durham to "Corsoer", Denmark.
Concordia	United Kingdom	The barque was driven ashore in the Bay of Toaf, Cape Verde Islands. Her crew were rescued. She was on a voyage from Plymouth, Devon to Sierra Leone. The wreck was plundered by the local inhabitants.
Duchess of Buccleuch	United Kingdom	The ship ran aground and was damaged in the Hooghly River. She was on a voyage from Liverpool, Lancashire to Calcutta, India. She was refloated and taken in to Calcutta.
Elizabeth Ainslie	United Kingdom	The ship ran aground in the Hooghly River. She was on a voyage from Newcastle upon Tyne, Northumberland to Calcutta. She was refloated and taken in to Calcutta.
Erin	United Kingdom	The ship was wrecked near Thisted, Denmark. Her crew were rescued. She was on a voyage from London to Sunderland, County Durham.
Frey	Norway	The brig was abandoned in the Mediterranean Sea 40 leagues (120 nautical miles (220 km)) east of Barcelona, Spain. Her crew were rescued by Rio de Pique (France). Frey was on a voyage from Livorno, Grand Duchy of Tuscany to New York, United States.
Harvest Home	United Kingdom	The ship ran aground and was damaged in the Hooghly River. She was on a voyage from Cochin to Calcutta.
Jane	United Kingdom	The smack foundered in the Irish Sea 6 nautical miles (11 km) west south west of Worms Head, Glamorgan. Her three crew were rescued by the schooner Mystery (United Kingdom). Jane was on a voyage from St. Ives, Cornwall to Llanelly, Glamorgan.

== 20 February ==
List of shipwrecks: 20 February 1850
Ship	State	Description
Ben Lomond	United Kingdom	The ship arrived at Aden from London with her cargo of coal on fire and was scuttled. She was later refloated.
Bon Leon	France	The ship ran aground in the Isles of Scilly, United Kingdom. She was on a voyage from Luçon to Cork, United Kingdom. She was refloated.
Commercial	United Kingdom	The barque foundered in the Mediterranean Sea 14 nautical miles (26 km) off "Tinfla", Greece. All twenty people on board survived.
Formosa	United Kingdom	The ship was driven ashore and wrecked in the Huangpu River downstream of Woosung, China.
Hiram	United Kingdom	The ship was driven ashore on Porquerolles, Var, France. She was on a voyage from Grangemouth, Stirlingshire to Marseille, Bouches-du-Rhône, France.
Lady Sale	United Kingdom	The ship was driven ashore in the Huangpu River upstream of Woosung.
Margaret	United Kingdom	The ship was run into by Sybil and was beached in the River Thames at Gravesend, Kent. She was later refloated and towed upstream in a leaky condition.
Susan	United Kingdom	The ship sank at Port Talbot, Glamorgan.

== 21 February ==
List of shipwrecks: 21 February 1850
Ship	State	Description
Achilles	United Kingdom	The barque was wrecked on the Isla de Lobos, Uruguay. Her crew were rescued. She was on a voyage from Cádiz, Spain to Buenos Aires, Argentina.
Amalia	United Kingdom	The ship was sunk by ice off Memel, Prussia. Her crew were rescued. She was on a voyage from Hull, Yorkshire to Memel.
Lucy	United Kingdom	The barque sprang a leak and was beached 20 nautical miles (37 km) south of Bridlington, Yorkshire.
William Rodger	United Kingdom	The ship ran aground on the North Bank, in Liverpool Bay. She was on a voyage from Liverpool, Lancashire to Drogheda, County Louth.

== 22 February ==
List of shipwrecks: 22 February 1850
Ship	State	Description
Aimable Eulalie	France	The ship ran aground on the Dufour Rocks. She was on a voyage from Nantes, Loire-Inférieure, France to Liverpool, Lancashire. She was refloated and put in to Le Croisic, Loire-Inférieure in a leaky condition.
Eliza	United Kingdom	The ship was driven ashore and wrecked at Troon, Ayrshire.
Farnham	United Kingdom	The ship was beached near Lamlash, Isle of Arran, Inner Hebrides.
Hinderica Jantina	Netherlands	The ship was driven ashore on Juist, Kingdom of Hanover. Her crew were rescued. She was on a voyage from London, United Kingdom to Groningen.
Louis	Stettin	The ship was wrecked on the Swinebottoms, in the Baltic Sea. She was on a voyage from Newcastle upon Tyne, Northumberland, United Kingdom to Stettin.
Minerva	(United Kingdom of Great Britain and Ireland) British North America	The ship was wrecked on "Fone Island", New Jersey, United States. She was on a voyage from Halifax, Nova Scotia to New York, United States.
Van	United Kingdom	The ship ran aground on the Gunfleet Sand, in the North Sea off the coast of Essex. She was on a voyage from Newcastle upon Tyne to London. She was refloated and taken in to Harwich, Essex.
William Wallace	United States	The fishing schooner was lost on the Grand Banks. All 8 crew were killed.

== 23 February ==
List of shipwrecks: 23 February 1850
Ship	State	Description
Alkmaar	United Kingdom	The ship ran aground on Scroby Sands, Norfolk. She was refloated.
Fame	France	The ship was destroyed by fire at Santa Cruz, Tenerife, Canary Islands. She was on a voyage from Marseille, Bouches-du-Rhône to Montevideo, Uruguay.
St. Pierre	France	The chasse-marée ran aground on the Scroby Sands, Norfolk, United Kingdom and sank with the loss of two of her crew.
Terra Nova	United Kingdom	The ship sprang a leak and was beached at São Paulo, Brazil. Her crew were rescued. She was on a voyage from Patagonia, Argentina to Falmouth, Cornwall.

== 24 February ==
List of shipwrecks: 24 February 1850
Ship	State	Description
Alfred	United Kingdom	The ship ran aground on the Foreness Rock, Margate, Kent. She was on a voyage from Calais, France to London. She was refloated the next day.
Expert	United Kingdom	The ship ran aground and was damaged on the Jardanilloes. She was on a voyage from Cuba to Falmouth, Cornwall. She was refloated and resumed her voyage in a leaky condition.
Hindostan	United Kingdom	The ship departed from Bombay, India for London. No further trace, presumed foundered with the loss of all hands.
Mercurius	United Kingdom	The ship passed through The Downs whilst on a voyage from Newcastle upon Tyne, Northumberland to New York, United States. No further trace, presumed foundered with the loss of all hands.

== 25 February ==
List of shipwrecks: 25 February 1850
Ship	State	Description
Brierly Hill	United Kingdom	The ship was driven ashore near Salonica, Greece. She was on a voyage from Salonica to Queenstown, County Cork. She was refloated on 2 March and resumed her voyage.
New Herald	United Kingdom	The sloop ran aground on the Arklow Bank, in the Irish Sea off the coast of County Wicklow and was abandoned. She was on a voyage from Liverpool, Lancashire to Nantes, Loire-Inférieure, France. She floated off and was subsequently towed in to Dublin by the schooner Leven (United Kingdom).

== 26 February ==
List of shipwrecks: 26 February 1850
Ship	State	Description
Bee	United Kingdom	The ship was driven ashore at Redcar, Yorkshire. She was on a voyage from Hull, Yorkshire to Stockton-on-Tees, County Durham. She was refloated the next day.
Elizabeth Jane	United Kingdom	The ship was driven ashore at Redcar. She was on a voyage from Ipswich, Suffolk to Middlesbrough, Yorkshire.
Mars	United Kingdom	The ship was wrecked off Cape Florida, United States. She was on a voyage from Cárdenas, Cuba to Halifax, Nova Scotia, British North America.

== 27 February ==
List of shipwrecks: 27 February 1850
Ship	State	Description
Caroline Frances	United Kingdom	The ship was run aground at Langstone, Hampshire.
Euphrates	United Kingdom	The barque was wrecked on the La Folle Reef, off the Île à Vache, Saint Domingo. Her crew survived. She was on a voyage from Saint Thomas, Virgin Islands to Jamaica.
Home	United Kingdom	The ship was driven ashore at New Romney, Kent. She was on a voyage from London to the Cape of Good Hope, Cape Colony. She was refloated and resumed her voyage.
Kate	United Kingdom	The ship struck a sunken rock in the Sound of Islay and was damaged. She put in to Isleornsay, Skye, Outer Hebrides in a leaky condition.

== 28 February ==
List of shipwrecks: 28 February 1850
Ship	State	Description
Abbess, and Pioneer	United Kingdom	The tug Pioneer and her tow, the smack Abbess, ran aground on the Manacles and were severely damaged. They were on a voyage from Neath, Glamorgan to Bristol, Gloucestershire. They were refloated in a severely leaky condition and taken in to Porthcawl, Glamorgan. Abbess ran aground and Pioneer was beached there. Abbess was refloated on 1 March and taken in to Porth, Glamorgan. Pioneer was refloated that day and taken in to Neath.
Alexandre	France	The ship was wrecked on the Jardinilloes, off the coast of Cuba. All on board were rescued. She was on a voyage from Martinique, New Orleans, Louisiana, United States.
Lydia, and Sir Robert Seppings	United Kingdom	Lydia was run into by Sir Robert Seppings and was driven ashore at Point de Galle, Mauritius. She was on a voyage from Calcutta, India to London. She was refloated and taken in to Point de Galle. Sir Robert Seppings was severely damaged. She was on a voyage from Ceylon to London. She was taken in to Point de Galle for repairs.

== Unknown date ==
List of shipwrecks: Unknown February 1850
Ship	State	Description
Adrien	France	The ship was driven ashore and severely damaged at the mouth of the Seine. She was on a voyage from Marseille, Bouches-du-Rhône to Abbeville, Somme.
Aimable Eleonore	France	The ship was lost off Camaret-sur-Mer, Finistère.
Albatross	France	The ship was wrecked at Sainte-Rose, Île Bourbon before 19 February.
Ann	United Kingdom	The schooner was abandoned in the Baltic Sea before 5 February.
Anne	United Kingdom	The ship was driven ashore whilst on a voyage from Workington, Cumberland to Dublin. She was refloated and towed in to Belfast, County Antrim for repairs. She arrived on 14 February.
Arethusa	United Kingdom	The ship was driven ashore at Porthdinllaen, Caernarfonshire. She was on a voyage from Liverpool, Lancashire to Bristol, Gloucestershire. She was refloated on 10 February.
Britannia	United Kingdom	The ship was driven ashore and damaged at Beaumaris, Anglesey. She was refloated on 13 February.
Eliza	United Kingdom	The smack was driven ashore and wrecked at Troon, Ayrshire.
Elizabeth	United Kingdom	The ship was wrecked on Brown's Bank, off Charleston, South Carolina, United States. Her crew were rescued. She was on a voyage from Liverpool to Savannah, Georgia, United States.
Fazet Rohomay	India	The ship was abandoned in the Bay of Bengal (20°30′N 92°30′E) before 20 February.
Francis	Kingdom of the Two Sicilies	The ship was driven ashore at Gallipoli before 4 February.
Ganymede	(United Kingdom of Great Britain and Ireland) British North America	The brigantine ran aground on Key Large before 7 February. She was on a voyage from Jamaica to Halifax, Nova Scotia.
Hull	United Kingdom	The ship was driven ashore at Bangor, County Down. She was refloated on 23 February and towed in to Belfast, County Antrim.
Isidore	United Kingdom	The ship was wrecked at Honfleur, Manche between 4 and 9 February.
Jupiter	Kingdom of Hanover	The ship was driven ashore in the Elbe downstream of Brunshausen. She had been refloated by 14 February.
Margaret	United Kingdom	The ship was run into by another vessel and was consequently beached at Gravesend, Kent. She was on a voyage from Hartlepool, County Durham to London. She was refloated and towed in to London in a leaky condition.
Margaret	Flag unknown	The ship under was wrecked in the Huahine Islands.
Mary	United Kingdom	The ship was driven ashore and wrecked in Carnarvon Bay before 11 February.
Newport Trader	United Kingdom	The ship sank off the coast of Essex before 18 February.
Oru	Hamburg	The ship ran aground on the Punta Reef, off the cost of Cuba. She was on a voyage from Hamburg to Havana, Cuba. She was refloated on 14 February and taken in to Havana in a wrecked condition.
Pictura	Netherlands	The ship was in collision with another vessel and ran aground in the Steinbergscher Vilet. She was refloated and towed in to Dordrecht, South Holland.
Rosa	United Kingdom	The ship was driven ashore in Bantry Bay. She was on a voyage from Genoa, Kingdom of Sardinia to Liverpool. She was refloated with assistance from HMS Shearwater Royal Navy) and towed in to Queenstown, County Cork in a leaky condition.
Santipetre	Flag unknown	The ship was wrecked on the Long Sand, in the North Sea off the coast of Essex before 4 February.
William Wallace	United States	The fishing schooner was lost on the Georges Bank with all 8 hands.
