= Charles Henry Waller =

English minister, theologian and teacher

Charles Henry Waller (1840–1910) was a Church of England minister, evangelical theologian and teacher.

== Early life and education ==
Born at Ettingshall in Staffordshire (now part of Wolverhampton) on 23 November 1840, Waller was the only surviving child of Stephen R. Waller, vicar of Ettingshall and his first wife Lucy Cameron. His grandfather, the Rev. Harry Waller of Hall Bam, Beaconsfield, was descended from Edmund Waller, a seventeenth-century English poet. His mother was eldest daughter of the Rev. Charles Richard Cameron and Lucy Lyttelton Cameron, writer of religious tales for children. His great-aunt was Mary Martha Sherwood, an author.

Educated at Bromsgrove School, he matriculated on 4 June 1859 at University College, Oxford, and held a scholarship there (1859–1864). He took a first class in classics and a second in mathematical moderations in 1861, and a second in literae humaniores, and a third in mathematical finals in 1863, graduating B.A. in 1863; M.A. in 1867; B.D. and D.D. in 1891. He also won the Denyer and Johnson theological scholarship on its first award in 1866.

== Career ==
Ordained deacon in 1864, and priest in 1865, he became curate of St Jude, Mildmay Park, under William Pennefather. In 1865, on the recommendation of Canon A. M. W. Christopher of Oxford, he began his long service to the theological college, St John's Hall, Highbury, as tutor under Thomas Pownall Boultbee. He served in addition as reader or curate on Sundays at Christ Church, Down Street (1865–1869), and at Curzon Chapel, Mayfair, in 1869, under Anthony Thorold, and was minister of St John's Chapel, Hampstead from 1870 to 1874. He became McNeile professor of biblical exegesis at St John's Hall in 1882, and principal from 1884, on Boultbee's death, until his retirement on a pension in 1898. Of some 700 of his pupils at St John's Hall, the majority entered the ministry of the Church of England.

A pronounced evangelical, he acted as examining chaplain to Bishop J. C. Ryle. At Oxford he had come under the influence of John William Burgon. Through his life, his main interest lay in the conservative study and interpretation of the Scriptures, on which he wrote much.

He died on 9 May 1910 at Little Coxwell, Faringdon, Berkshire, and was buried there.

A collection of his sermons is held at Durham Cathedral.

== Family ==
He married, at Heckington, Lincolnshire, on 22 July 1865, Anna Maria, daughter of the Rev. James Stubbs and together they had four sons (three in holy orders) and three daughters (one a Church Mission Society missionary at Sigra, Benares).

Waller was the father of Rev. Charles Cameron Waller (author of The Sojourn of the Israelites in Egypt And Its Relation to Secular History, The Churchman), Rev. Edward Waller and Rev. Alfred Hamilton Waller.

He had several younger siblings through his father’s second and third marriages; his brother Percy was a parish priest in Birmingham and London.

== Publications ==
- The Names on the Gates of Pearl, and other Studies, 1875; 3rd edition 1904.
- A Grammar and Analytical Vocabulary of the Words in the Greek Testament, 2 parts, 1877-8. Part 1, Part 2.
- The volumes on Deuteronomy and Joshua in Ellicott's Commentary, 1882. Deuteronomy
- The Authoritative Inspiration of Holy Scripture, as distinct from the Inspiration of its Human Authors, 1887
- A Handbook to the Epistles of St. Paul, 1887.
- Apostolical Succession tested by Holy Scripture, 1895.
- The Word of God and the Testimony of Jesus Christ, 1903.
- Moses and the Prophets, a Plea for the Authority of Moses in Holy Scripture, 1907: a reply to the Rev. Canon Driver.
- Shadows of Redemption
- The Silver Sockets
- 'When Ye Pray' Or, Lessons on Prayer
- Path to the City of Gold
- Adoption and the Covenant, Some Thoughts on Confirmation
- Notes on the Twelve Lesser Prophets, 1904
- The Greek Text of Westcott and Hort, The Case of the Conservatives
- Every-day Life

Journal articles:

- Waller, Charles Henry. 'Dean Burgon's "Revision Revised",' The Churchman 9.54 (March 1883): 443-450
- Waller, Charles Henry. 'Burgon and Millers "Traditional Text of the Holy Gospels",' The Churchman 10.11 (August 1896): 573-578.
