= Origin Scotland =

== History ==
Origin Scotland is a non-denominational Christian ministry and registered charity based in the United Kingdom city of Edinburgh. Founded in 1997 as a ministry of Charlotte Chapel, Carrubbers Christian Centre and Bellevue Chapel, it was created to promote unity in the church and outreach through holding large and small-scale events in central Scotland. In 2002 it became independent of the founding churches, but appointed members of their leaderships to an oversight committee to hold the Origin Scotland executive accountable. In 2005, following two previous exploratory visits, Origin founded a daughter mission Origin South Africa in Cape Town, South Africa.

== Music ==
Origin Scotland founded the musical collective Exile to further its aims. The collective is made up of the Exile Band and Choir and the Exile Chamber Orchestra, who perform several major (audiences above 1,500) and up to ten smaller events each year. The group have also performed live on BBC Radio Scotland, recorded for BBC Television and in 2009 released their first original album 'un|broken'.

Origin holds outreach and praise & worship events across central Scotland throughout the year.

== Discography ==
un|broken (Mucmara Studios 2009)

== Publishing ==
Origin publishes a comprehensive online directory of churches in Edinburgh, along with bi-annual printed publications Tourist Church Guide and Student Church Guide. Since 2007 the Student Church Guide has been extended to cover Churches in Glasgow, Aberdeen, Dundee, Perth, St Andrew's and Paisley – most of the university towns in Scotland, and is distributed through University Christian Unions, churches, Scripture Union, iOS and Android apps, while the Tourist Church Guide covers only churches in Edinburgh.

== Major events since 2000 ==
Christmas with J.John, Usher Hall, Edinburgh, 7 December 2019
Resurrection 2019, Usher Hall, Edinburgh, 21 April 2019
Christmas with guests, Usher Hall, Edinburgh 1 December 2018
Symphonic Praise, Glasgow Cathedral/St Mary's Cathedral Edinburgh, 29/30 September 2018
Resurrection 2018, Usher Hall, Edinburgh, 1 April 2018
It's Christmas!, Usher Hall, Edinburgh 2 December 2017
Symphonic Praise, Glasgow Cathedral/St Mary's Cathedral Edinburgh, 3/4 June 2017
Resurrection 2017, Usher Hall, Edinburgh, 16 April 2017
Symphonic Praise, Glasgow Cathedral/St Mary's Cathedral Edinburgh, 4/5 June 2016
Resurrection 2016, Usher Hall, Edinburgh, 27 March 2016
Symphonic Praise, Glasgow Cathedral/St Mary's Cathedral Edinburgh, 30/31 May 2015
Resurrection 2015, Usher Hall, Edinburgh, 5 April 2015
Symphonic Praise, Glasgow Cathedral/St Mary's Cathedral Edinburgh, 21/22 June 2014
City Praise 2014, Usher Hall, 4 May 2014
Light of the World 2013, Usher Hall Edinburgh 7 Dec/Royal Concert Hall Glasgow 8 Dec 2013
City Praise 2013:FREEDOM, Glasgow Royal Concert Hall, 6 October 2013
Symphonic Praise, St Mary's Cathedral, 1 June 2013
Resurrection 2013, Usher Hall, Edinburgh, 31 March 2013
15th Anniversary Christmas Concert, Usher Hall, Edinburgh, 1 December 2012
City Praise, Usher Hall, Edinburgh, 29 April 2012
Christmas According to Hollywood, Usher Hall, Edinburgh, 3 December 2011
Resurrection 2011, Usher Hall, Edinburgh, 24 April 2011
Live at the HMV Picturehouse, Edinburgh, 5 March 2010
Light of the World, Usher Hall, Edinburgh, 4 December 2010
City Praise, Glasgow Royal Concert Hall, 3 October 2010
Light of the World, Usher Hall, Edinburgh, 5 December 2009
City Praise, Usher Hall, Edinburgh, 18 October 2009
Resurrection, Highland Hall, Royal Highland Society, Ingliston, 8 April 2007
Not Another Silent Night Again, Usher Hall, Edinburgh, 9 December 2006
City Praise, Usher Hall, Edinburgh, 22 October 2006
Resurrection, Usher Hall, Edinburgh, 16 April 2006
Not a Bleak Midwinter, Usher Hall, Edinburgh, 10 December 2005
City Praise, Usher Hall, Edinburgh, 16 October 2005
Gospel According to Hollywood, Usher Hall, Edinburgh, 12 March 2005
Not Another Silent Night, Usher Hall, Edinburgh, 11 Dec 2004
City Praise, Usher Hall, Edinburgh, 17 October 2004
Not A Silent Night, Usher Hall, Edinburgh, December 2003
Gospel Night, Usher Hall, Edinburgh, 9 March 2003
Gospel Night, Edinburgh Playhouse, 13 March 2001
Man Behind the Millennium, Festival Theatre, Edinburgh, 2 January 2000
