= J.John =

British evangelist and author (born 1958)

The Reverend Canon J.John
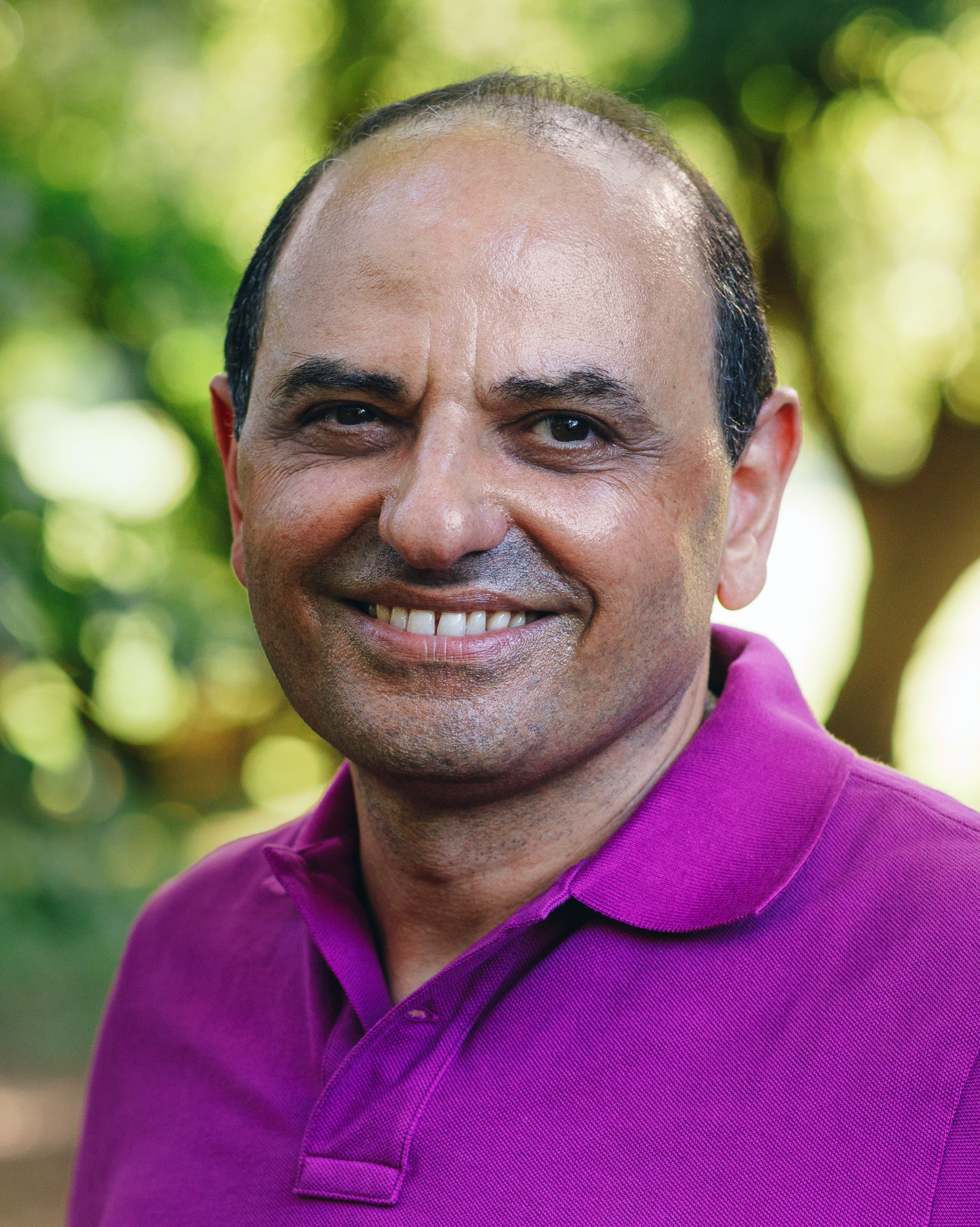
- Born: John Ioannou John; 2 June 1958 (age 68); London, England
- Education: Lambeth MA
- Alma mater: Hendon College; St. John's Theological College, Nottingham
- Occupations: Evangelist, Christian minister, author, broadcaster
- Organization: Philo Trust
- Website: www.canonjjohn.com

John Ioannou John, best known as J.John, is an evangelist, author and broadcaster based in the United Kingdom.

== Early life ==
J.John was born on 2 June 1958 in London to George and Helen Ioannou. His Greek name is Ioannes Ioannou, which translates as John John.

J.John studied psychology when he became a Christian in 1975.

== Career ==
Before working in Christian ministry, J.John started his career in 1976 as a psychiatric nurse at Napsbury Hospital in St Albans, England.

=== Early ministry ===
In 1978, J.John studied theology at St John's College, Nottingham, England. In 1979, he worked at the Christian Renewal Centre in Northern Ireland. During this time he took part in reconciliation work as a member of the community, including mission work and prison work.

in 1979, J.John was appointed as the evangelist at St Nicholas' Church in Nottingham, England, under the leadership of David and Joyce Huggett. Whilst overseeing the evangelism work within the church and in Nottingham, he also began working as an itinerant evangelist. J.John spoke at colleges, youth events and churches. In 1998, he received a Lambeth Master of Arts (MA) degree from Archbishop George Carey, in recognition of church growth and evangelism.

In February 2003, J.John was appointed an honorary canon of Coventry Cathedral. He is known for his Christmas sermons, which are popular in the United Kingdom.

In 2023, at the height of the Mike Pilavachi scandal, J.John received backlash for a comment he made supporting him.

In a 2025 interview with Phil Cooke, J.John emphasised his commitment to the title of evangelist and described his daily practice of praying for people who do not share his faith, highlighting his relational approach to evangelism.

=== Philo Trust ===
J.John established Philo Trust as a charity in 1980 in Nottingham, which in 1997 moved to Chorleywood, England. The purpose of Philo Trust is to support J.John in his ministry ("philo" is the Greek word for brotherly love). Philo Trust has a number of associates, including Christine Caine, Joseph Boot, and Paul McGee.

=== just10 ===
In January 1998 J.John began teaching the Ten Commandments through a ten-week course called just10. The series is aimed at people from all walks of life and aims to show that following the 10 laws given to Moses by God. just10 is split into 10 segments, with each segment focusing on a different commandment. just10 was originally named TEN and the original series was filmed in front of a live audience at Capitol Studios. Over the years, just10 has developed into a just10 Tookilt, a DVD course for Churches, and a DVD course for Small Groups (2010). The latest version of the series and book were released in 2023. just10 missions has impacted 37 places around the world including London, New York, and Sydney.

=== JustOne ===
In 2017, J.John hosted the first JustOne event at Emirates Stadium, home of Arsenal Football Club in London. The name is derived from J.John's just10 course; the focus of the event is 'Just One Day, Just One Message, and Just One Invitation'. The second JustOne event took place at Priestfield Stadium on 9 June 2018. Over 100 churches partnered to make the event possible.

=== Evangelism ===
J.John is an evangelist who has spoken at Christian events, conferences, and churches globally. His ministry work has taken him to 69 countries across six continents, with a particular focus on mass-evangelistic events often scheduled around Christian holidays.

He has spoken at several large or well-known Christian venues and events, including the Times Square Church in New York City, Holy Trinity Brompton (HTB) in London, and the Lakewood Church in Houston, Texas. His conference appearances have included international events like the Hillsong Colour Conference and the Presence Conference.

=== Media ===
J.John has a weekly television and radio series called Today with J.John. The series features a mixture of his sermons and Facing the Canon interviews and is broadcast on Shine TV, Revelation TV, Kanal 10, Branch FM, UCB Ireland, Vision Christian Radio Australia. Guests have included Jackie Pullinger, N. T. Wright, John Lennox, Christine Caine, Nicky Gumbel, Teo Hayashi, David Harper, R.T. Kendall, Bear Grylls, Alexa PenaVega.

J.John has been published in The Times on faith-related matters. and the Daily Mirror

== Selected works ==
J.John has authored over 60 books since 1988. Select publications include:

- "The Road Home" (2005) ISBN 978-1860242397
- "The Return: Grace and the Prodigal (co‑authored with Chris Walley)" (2011) ISBN 978-1860242397
- "Pilgrim: John Bunyan's the Pilgrim's Progress a Contemporary Retelling" (2012) ISBN 978-1860242397
- "just10" (2013) ISBN 978-1860242397
- "God With Us: 25 Advent Reflections" (2014) ISBN 978-1860242397
- "The Natural Evangelism Course" (2014) ISBN 978-1860242397
- "Making the Connection" (2015) ISBN 978-1860242397
- "Knowing God" (2017) ISBN 978-1860242397
- "The Christmas Story" (2018) ISBN 978-1860242397
- "The Easter Story (Theology for Little People)" (2018) ISBN 978-1860242397
- "Amuse‑Bouche: Food For The Soul" (2019) ISBN 978-1860242397
- "Jesus Christ − The Truth (co‑authored with Chris Walley)" (2019) ISBN 978-1860242397
- "That's a Good Question!" (2019) ISBN 978-1860242397
- "Will I Be Fat in Heaven? and Other Curious Questions" (2022) ISBN 978-1860242397
- "Heroes of the Faith" (2024) ISBN 978-1860242397

== Personal life ==
J.John has been married since 1983 and has three children with his wife.
