= Anthony Thiselton =

British theologian and priest (1937–2023)

Anthony Thiselton FBA
- Born: Anthony Charles Thiselton; 13 July 1937
- Died: 7 February 2023 (aged 85)
- Occupations: principal of both St John's College, Nottingham and St John's College, Durham, Emeritus professor of Christian theology and head of department in the University of Nottingham
- Awards: Lambeth Doctorate of Divinity; Fellow of the British Academy

Academic background
- Education: City of London School, King's College London, University of Sheffield, University of Durham

Academic work
- Discipline: Theology
- Sub-discipline: Biblical studies; Hermeneutics; Christian doctrine
- School or tradition: Conservative evangelical
- Institutions: University of Nottingham; St John's College, Nottingham; St John's College, Durham

Anthony Charles Thiselton FBA (13 July 1937 – 7 February 2023) was an English Anglican priest, theologian, and academic. He wrote a number of books and articles on a range of topics in Christian theology, biblical studies, and the philosophy of religion. He served on the Human Fertilisation and Embryology Authority, appointed by the Minister of Health.

== Biography ==
Anthony Charles Thiselton was born on 13 July 1937. He was educated at City of London School, with degrees from King's College London (BD, MTh) the University of Sheffield (PhD) and the University of Durham (DD). He received an honorary doctorate from the University of Chester; in March 2012. Thiselton was an Honorary Fellow of Cranmer Hall, Durham; fellow of King's College London and fellow of the British Academy.

Thiselton was head of theology at the University of Nottingham and was also principal of both St John's College, Nottingham (1986 to 1988) and St John's College, Durham (1988 to 1992). He was a priest and canon in the Church of England, in which he represented the Diocese of Southwell on the church's General Synod. He was an associate priest in the parish of St Mary the Virgin, Attenborough, Nottingham. On 25 June 2002, he was presented with a Lambeth Degree of Doctorate of Divinity by the then Archbishop of Canterbury, George Carey.

Thiselton was visiting Professor at Fuller Theological Seminary, Pasadena; Calvin College, Grand Rapids; Regent College, Vancouver; North Park, Seminary, Chicago; the University of Utrecht, Netherlands; several seminaries in South Korea; Senior Lecturer in the University of Sheffield; and Professor of Theology in the University of Chester. Thiselton retired from Nottingham in 2001; then served as Professor of Christian Theology at the University of Chester from 2001 to 2006. He returned to Nottingham as professor, from 2006, and his retirement in 2011 marked his final retirement from academic posts.

Thiselton served on the Church of England General Synod membership, and its Commissions and Committees: Crown Nominations Commission, (2000-2010); Appointments Committee (2008–13); and Theological Education and Training Committee (1999-2005). Outside Synod he remained on the Doctrine Commission for nearly 30 years: Church of England Doctrine Commission (1976-2006); Acting Chairman (1987); Church of England Faith and Order Group (1979–89); and Theological Education in the Anglican Communion (2003–06).

His main published work was in the areas of hermeneutics (especially hermeneutical theory and its relationship to biblical interpretation), Christian doctrine (including eschatology and pneumatology), and biblical studies, in particular with two substantial commentaries on 1 Corinthians. He is unusual in academic theology for publishing research-level works across such a broad range of topics.

Thiselton received a Festschrift, edited by Stanley Porter and Matthew Malcolm, entitled Horizons in Hermeneutics (Eerdmans) in April 2013. In June 2012 he was also the subject of a one-day conference in his honour, at the University of Nottingham, at which he presented a response paper to several contributors who spoke in light of his work. Proceedings from this conference were published by Paternoster (in the UK) and IVP (in the US) as The Future of Biblical Interpretation (2013). St John's College, Nottingham, inaugurated a series of "Thiselton lectures" in 2013 to honour his work in hermeneutics. He gave the first of these himself, in June 2013.

Thiselton died on 7 February 2023, at the age of 85.

=== Views ===
Thiselton was described in 2002, during the selection of the next Archbishop of Canterbury, as belonging to the conservative evangelical wing of the Church of England.

== Works ==
=== Books ===
- Thiselton, Anthony C. (1980). The Two Horizons: New Testament Hermeneutics and Philosophical Description with special reference to Heidegger, Bultmann, Gadamer, and Wittgenstein. Exeter; Grand Rapids, MI: Paternoster; Eerdmans. ISBN 978-0-802-83520-8. OCLC 4907859.
- ———; Lundin, Roger; Walhout, Clarence (1985). The Responsibility of Hermeneutics. Carlisle; Grand Rapids, MI: Paternoster; Eerdmans. ISBN 978-0-802-80029-9. OCLC 12371404.
- ——— (1992). New Horizons in Hermeneutics: The Theory and Practice of Transforming Biblical Reading. London; Grand Rapids, MI: HarperCollins; Zondervan. ISBN 978-0-310-51590-6. OCLC 24699360.
- ——— (1995). Interpreting God and the Postmodern Self: on meaning, manipulation, and promise. Edinburgh; Grand Rapids, MI: T & T Clark; Eerdmans. ISBN 978-0-802-84128-5. OCLC 33078178.
- ———; Lundin, Roger; Walhout, Clarence (1999). The Promise of Hermeneutics. Carlisle; Grand Rapids, MI: Paternoster; Eerdmans. ISBN 978-0-802-84635-8. OCLC 40848460.
- ——— (2000). The First Epistle to the Corinthians: A Commentary on the Greek Text. New International Greek Testament Commentary. Carlisle; Grand Rapids, MI: Paternoster; Eerdmans. ISBN 978-0-802-82449-3. OCLC 44926923.
- ——— (2001). A Concise Encyclopedia of the Philosophy of Religion (1st ed.). Oxford: Oneworld.
- ——— (2005). A Concise Encyclopedia of the Philosophy of Religion (North American ed.). Grand Rapids, MI: Baker Academic. ISBN 978-0-801-03120-5. OCLC 488237726.
- ——— (2006). Thiselton on Hermeneutics: Collected Works and New Essays. Grand Rapids, MI: Eerdmans. ISBN 978-0-802-83236-8. OCLC 66392781.
- ——— (2006). 1 Corinthians: A Shorter Exegetical and Pastoral Commentary. Grand Rapids, MI: Eerdmans. ISBN 978-0-802-82682-4. OCLC 71275476.
- ——— (2007). The Hermeneutics of Doctrine. Grand Rapids, MI: Eerdmans. ISBN 9780802826817. OCLC 154683042.
- ——— (2009). Hermeneutics: An Introduction. Grand Rapids, MI: Eerdmans. ISBN 978-0-802-86410-9. OCLC 368048466.
- ——— (2009). The Living Paul: An Introduction to the Apostle and this Thought. Downers Grove, IL: IVP Academic. ISBN 978-0-830-83881-3. OCLC 456729547.
- ——— (2011). 1 and 2 Thessalonians: Through the Centuries. Blackwell Bible commentaries. Malden, MA: Wiley-Blackwell. ISBN 978-0-830-83881-3. OCLC 456729547.
- ——— (2011). Life after Death: a New Approach to the Last Things. Grand Rapids, MI: Eerdmans. ISBN 978-0-802-86665-3. OCLC 723142256.
- ——— (2013). The Holy Spirit: In Biblical Teaching Through the Centuries and Today. Grand Rapids, MI: Eerdmans. ISBN 978-0-802-86875-6. OCLC 806521937.
- ——— (2015). The Thiselton Companion to Christian Theology. Grand Rapids, MI: Eerdmans. ISBN 978-0-802-87232-6. OCLC 887852055.
- ——— (2015). Systematic Theology. Grand Rapids, MI: Eerdmans. ISBN 978-0-802-87272-2. OCLC 907976292.
- ——— (2015). A Lifetime in the Church and the University. Eugene, OR: Cascade Books. ISBN 978-1-4982-0219-0. OCLC 920850428.
- ——— (2016). Discovering Romans. Grand Rapids, MI: Eerdmans. ISBN 978-0-8028-7409-2. - forthcoming 4 July 2016
- ——— (2016). A Shorter Guide to the Holy Spirit. Grand Rapids, MI: Eerdmans. ISBN 978-0802873491.
- ——— (2017). Doubt, Faith and Certainty. Grand Rapids, MI: Eerdmans. ISBN 978-0802873538.
- ——— (2017). Approaching Philosophy of Religion. London: SPCK. ISBN 978-0281076765.
- ——— (2018). Puzzling Passages in Paul, Forty Conundrums Calmly Considered. Eugene, OR: Wipf and Stock. ISBN 978-1-5326-5054-3.
- ——— (2019). 2 Corinthians: A Short Exegetical and Pastoral Commentary. Eugene, OR: Wipf and Stock. ISBN 978-1-5326-7270-5.
- ——— (2020). Colossians: A Short Exegetical and Pastoral Commentary. Eugene, OR: Wipf and Stock. ISBN 978-1-7252-5852-5.
- ——— (2020). Promise and Prayer: The Biblical Writings in the Light of Speech-Act Theory. Eugene, OR: Wipf and Stock. ISBN 978-1-7252-5360-5.

=== Articles and chapters ===
——— (1970). "Parables as Speech-Events". Scottish Journal of Theology. 23: 466.

== Bibliography ==
- Bartholomew, Craig G. (1996). "Three Horizons: Hermeneutics from the Other End―An Evaluation of Anthony Thiselton's Hermeneutic Proposals". European Journal of Theology. 5 (2): 121–135.
- "Who's Who (2012 edition, p.1272)".
