= Richard Smethurst =

Richard Good Smethurst (born 17 January 1941) is an economist, who was provost of Worcester College, Oxford.

== Education ==
Smethurst was educated at Liverpool College, Worcester College, Oxford, and Nuffield College, Oxford.

== Career ==
In 1964, Smethurst was appointed research fellow at St Edmund Hall, Oxford. In the following academic year (1965/66) he was simultaneously Fellow and tutor in economics at St Edmund Hall, Oxford and consultant to the UN Food and Agriculture Organization programme at the Oxford Institute of Commonwealth Studies. In 1967, he became a fellow of Worcester College, Oxford where he was also tutor in economics and university lecturer in economics until 1976.

Meanwhile, he was also part-time economic advisor to Her Majesty's Treasury 1969–71 and part-time policy advisor to the Prime Minister's Policy Unit 1975–76 (Harold Wilson's second term). From 1976 until 1986 he was professorial fellow at Worcester and director of Oxford University Department for External Studies. In 1978 he had been appointed a part-time member of the Monopolies and Mergers Commission and in 1986 he became its deputy chairman. He held this position until 1989 when, rather than becoming its chairman, he returned to Oxford as chairman of the General Board of the Faculties.

In 1991 he became provost of Worcester and in 1997 he was appointed pro-vice-chancellor of the university. He was appointed President of the Thames and Solent Workers' Educational Association in 1992 and president of the National Institute of Adult Continuing Education in 1994. He retired as provost of Worcester in Summer 2011.

Smethurst was once tutor to John Hood, subsequently vice-chancellor of the University of Oxford.

== Private life ==
Smethurst is married to Sue Gillingham, an Oxford theologian and authority on the Psalms.

== Sources and further information ==
- International Adult and Continuing Education Hall of Fame
- Debrett's People of Today (12th edn, London: Debrett's Peerage, 1999), p. 1810
- Georgina Ferry, 'Back from the edge', Oxford Today 17:1 (Michaelmas 2004)

Academic offices
Preceded by Asa Briggs	Provost of Worcester College, Oxford; 1991–2011	Succeeded by Jonathan Bate
