= Origin South Africa =

Origin South Africa is a non-denominational Christian agency founded in 2005 as a daughter ministry of Origin Scotland. It was formed to promote unity and outreach in the Church in Cape Town, South Africa. It is a registered NPO (Non-Profit Organisation), Registration No: 055-618-NPO. It operates from its headquarters in Durbanville, South Africa, in the Northern Suburbs of Cape Town.

Born- 10 July 1978(42 years of age) Race- Coloured

== Music ==
Origin South Africa promotes and holds music-based Christian praise and worship events in Cape Town, as well as performance-based outreach events using its music collective comprising a 5-piece band, the Cape Town Gospel Choir and orchestra. Events are held in secular and church venues around the city. Events are mostly in smaller venues (<750 seats) with major events anticipating audiences over 1000. The Cape Town Gospel Choir was founded in 2010, with the aim of promoting unity in the church and outreach to the world.

== Publishing ==
Origin South Africa publishes an online directory of churches in Cape Town, covering most of the city's Christian denominations.

== Major events ==
Symphonic Praise with the Cape Town Philharmonic Orchestra, Cape Town Gospel Choir and massed choirs, 19 September 2019
Christmas with Jubilee, Jubilee Church, Observatory, Cape Town, 16 December 2018
Christmas with Radio Tygerberg, Lighthouse, Parow, 9 December 2018
Ascension, St James Church, Cape Town, 10 May 2018
PRODIGAL tour with Foot Stomping Gospel Band, Cape Town, 11–18 February 2018
Symphonic Praise, Groote Kerk, Cape Town, 25 September 2017
Ascension, St James Church, Cape Town, 25 May 2017
Symphonic Praise, St James Church, Cape Town, 24 September 2015
Gospel Night with Neville D & Rouchelle Liedemann, Goodwood, 21 May 2016
Carols by Candlelight, Kirstenbosch National Botanical Gardens, 17–18 December 2015
Symphonic Praise, St George's Cathedral, Cape Town, 24 September 2015
Not A Silent Night, Full Gospel Church, Fish Hoek, 15–16 December 2012
UNITE, St James Church Kenilworth, Cape Town, 2–4 April 2012
Christmas with Rouchelle Liedemann, Ivan Siegelaar and the Cape Town Gospel Choir, City Hall, Cape Town, 11 Dec 2010
Praise Night: Worship the King, Bellville Civic Theatre, Cape Town, Sept 2009
Gospel According to Hollywood, City Hall, Cape Town, March 2005 (in association with Origin Scotland)
City Praise, City Hall, Cape Town, March 2005 (in association with Origin Scotland)
