= Christina Baxter =

British theologian

Christina Ann Baxter CBE (born 8 March 1947) is a British theologian and an active member of the Church of England (C of E). From 1997 to 2012, she was Principal of St John's College, Nottingham, an Anglican theological college. Since 1979, she has been a Reader, a type of lay minister, in the C of E. She served as Chairwoman of the House of Laity of the General Synod of the C of E from 1995 to 2010 and was a member of the Archbishops' Council from 1999 to 2010. In October 2000, she was made an honorary canon of Southwell Minster.

== Selected works ==
- Baxter, Christina, ed. (1987). Stepping Stones: Joint Essays on Anglican, Catholic and Evangelical Unity. London: Hodder & Stoughton.

Church of England titles
Preceded by John Goldingay	Principal of St John's College, Nottingham; 1997 to 2012	Succeeded by David Hilborn
