= St John's College, Nottingham =

Former theological college, previously the London College of Divinity

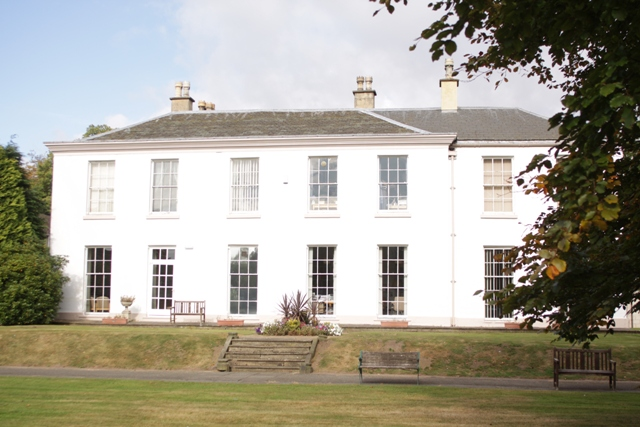
- Type: Theological college
- Active: 1863–2019
- Religious affiliation: Church of England
- Academic affiliations: University of Durham
- Location: Nottingham, England; 52.9296°N 1.2432°W
- Website: stjohns-nottm.ac.uk

St John's College, Nottingham, founded as the London College of Divinity, was an Anglican and interdenominational theological college situated in Bramcote, Nottingham, England. The college stood in the open evangelical tradition and stated that its mission was "to inspire creative Christian learning marked by evangelical conviction, theological excellence and Spirit-filled life, that all who train with us might be equipped for mission in a world of change".

St John's trained students for ministries in the Church of England and other denominations, independent students from a range of Christian contexts, and students for children's and youth ministries through its Midlands centre for the Institute for Children, Youth and Mission (MCYM). It offered full-time, part-time, blended and distance learning courses, including specialist modules in pastoral care and counselling and church administration. Academic awards were validated by Durham University and Gloucester University, and a self-accredited Certificate in Christian Studies.

== History ==
The college was established as the London College of Divinity in 1863. It was founded by the Reverend Alfred Peache and his sister, Kezia, who had inherited their businessman father's fortune in 1858. The college was established to provide an evangelical theological education to men who could not go to university. The Reverend Thomas Boultbee was appointed as the first principal and a college council and governing body was formed, with Lord Shaftesbury chosen to be its president. The first premises were near Kilburn High Road Station and the first student, Francis Browne, a lieutenant in the Merchant Navy, was welcomed on 23 November 1863.

These early premises had been called St John's Hall because they had previously been occupied by the St John's Foundation School for the Sons of Poor Clergy, which itself had started life in St John's Wood before moving to Kilburn. The 'St John's' name stuck as an informal title for the college— not least because Boultbee was a graduate of St John's College, Cambridge, and intended that the new institution he now led should attain academic standards comparable to those of his alma mater. Although the St John associated with St John's Wood is John the Baptist, Boultbee was clear that the St John of his fledgling 'St John's College' was John the Evangelist, author of the Fourth Gospel. The college moved to Highbury in 1866, taking over the Highbury College building formerly occupied by the Metropolitan Training College. This was its home for nearly 80 years, although from 1924 the site was owned and partially occupied by Arsenal Football Club, and the college became sitting tenants on a small part of the land.

In 1909, the college established an offshoot, also called St John's Hall, at Durham University, to enable students to read for BA degrees. This became St John's College, Durham, in 1919, and became fully independent of the London College of Divinity in 1922.

As the Second World War approached, the college was flourishing under the leadership of T. W. Gilbert. In spring 1941, however, faculty, staff and students were evacuated to Wadhurst School in Sussex as the Highbury buildings had been damaged by air-raids and were later requisitioned by the National Fire Service.

Following the sudden death of Gilbert in 1942, Prebendary Hinde was installed as Acting Principal, and the remnant of the college moved to share premises with Oak Hill Theological College.

In 1944 Donald Coggan became principal. During this time, a new site in Northwood, London, was bought for the college to replace the war-ruined buildings which now contained just three students. For the 10 years that Coggan was principal, the college was based in one of the houses at Harrow School for one year, and then at Ford Manor in Lingfield, Surrey from 1946-1957.

It was under Coggan's successor, Prebendary Hugh Jordan, that discussion of a move away from London began. Jordan believed that the college's future lay outside of the capital city and nearer to a university, and he learnt that a site was available in Nottingham, whose university's theological department was growing in reputation. In 1970, Michael Green, who succeeded Jordan as principal, oversaw the move from London to the college's new location in the Grade II listed The Grove, Bramcote, Nottingham. This move meant that the formal name 'London College of Divinity' was no longer applicable, and 'St John's' became the legal title of the institution.

From 1970 St John's developed and diversified its ministry under the successive leadership of Green, Robin Nixon, Colin Buchanan, Anthony Thiselton, John Goldingay, Christina Baxter, David Hilborn and Sally Nash. It was a pioneer of distance learning programmes in theology, and made new theological thinking and research accessible to a wide audience through its A5-sized Grove Booklet series (now published through an independent company and also available online). In the 1990s it ran the earliest forms of what would become known as context-based training in the Church of England, and latterly provided part-time pathways alongside more traditional forms of full-time residential training. In 2014 the college announced that it would be placing greater emphasis on contextual and part-time routes for licensed ministry and independent students, while maintaining and developing its ongoing provision of children's and youth ministry education, blended learning and distance learning. In February 2017 it gained planning permission for the redevelopment of its site and the modernisation of its main academic facilities. In late 2019 the college announced that delivery of its youth ministry programmes would be moving to a new location in central Leicester, and that its Distance Learning provision would be taken forward in collaboration with Queen's College, Birmingham. These changes coincided with the inauguration of a new hub of the Anglican-based St Mellitus College in central Nottingham.

In December 2019, the college closed due to financial constraints that affected its long term viability.

== Notable staff ==
=== List of principals ===
- Thomas Pownall Boultbee (1863 to 1884); inaugural principal
- Charles Waller (1884 to 1899)
- Albert Greenup (1899 to 1925)
- Thomas Gilbert (1926 to 1942)
- Donald Coggan (1944 to 1956); later Archbishop of Canterbury
- Hugh Jordan (1956-1969)
- Michael Green (1969 to 1975)
- Robin Ernest Nixon (1975 to 1978); died in office
- Colin Buchanan (1979 to 1985)
- Anthony Thiselton (1985 to 1986)
- John Goldingay (1986 to 1997)
- Christina Baxter (1997 to 2012); the first lay head of college
- David Hilborn (2012 to 2018); formerly Head of Theology at the Evangelical Alliance UK and Assistant Dean of St Mellitus College
- Sally Nash (Team Leader 2018-19)

=== Others ===
- George Carey, Archbishop of Canterbury (1991–2002)
- Graham Dow, Bishop of Carlisle (2000–2009)
- John Witcombe, Dean of Coventry Cathedral (2013-2026)

== Notable alumni ==
- Kenneth Bevan, missionary bishop in China
- Kate Bottley, Church of England priest and broadcaster
- Pete Broadbent, Bishop of Willesden
- Richard Burridge, Dean of King's College London
- Christopher Cocksworth, Bishop of Coventry (2008–present)
- Graham Dow, Bishop of Carlisle
- Viv Faull, Bishop of Bristol, Dean of York, Provost/Dean of Leicester
- Dan Gifford, third diocesan bishop of the Anglican Diocese of Canada
- Susan Gillingham, first British woman to be awarded a Doctor of Divinity degree by Oxford University
- David Ison, Dean of St Paul's Cathedral, London
- Bob Jackson, Church growth expert
- David James, Bishop of Bradford (2002-2010)
- Andy John, Bishop of Bangor (2009–present), Archbishop of Wales (2021-present)
- J.John, international evangelist and author based in the United Kingdom
- Janani Luwum, Archbishop of Uganda (1974–1977) and martyr
- Charlie Masters, second diocesan bishop of the Anglican Diocese of Canada
- Harold Miller, Bishop of Down and Dromore
- Ivan Neill, Chaplain General of the British Army and Provost of Sheffield
- Henry Luke Orombi, Archbishop of the (Anglican) Church of Uganda
- June Osborne, Bishop of Llandaff
- Moses Nathanael Christopher Omobiala Scott, Archbishop of West Africa
- Mike Stewart, bishop suffragan of the Anglican Diocese of Canada
- Anthony Thiselton, Professor of Christian Theology at University of Nottingham, Canon Theologian at Leicester and Southwell & Nottingham
- Howard Worsley, Vice Principal of Trinity College Bristol

== See also ==
- Listed buildings in Bramcote
