= Albert Greenup =

- Born: 5 June 1866
- Died: 9 January 1952; Baughurst
- Awards: Carus Greek Testament Prizes (1887)
- Scientific career

Albert William Greenup (d. 1952) was Principal of London College of Divinity from 1899 to 1925. He was widely known as a scholar of Hebrew and other Biblical languages, and published widely on Hebrew religious texts. He worked on the second edition of the Revised Version of the English Bible, published in 1910.

== Education ==
Greenup studied at St John's College Cambridge, receiving his B.A. in 1889. He was awarded D.Litt. in 1909, and also an honorary D.D. from the Western University of Canada in 1902.

== Career ==
He was ordained to the diaconate in the diocese of Ely in 1890, and priested the following year. He was appointed as: Curate of St Matthews, Cambridge, 1890–1893; Curate of Culford, 1893–1898; Rector of Alburgh, 1897–1899.

He worked as Librarian at London College of Divinity 1901–1903.

From 1903–1913, and 1922–1926 he also acted as an examiner in theology, Hebrew, New Testament Greek, Syriac, and ecclesiastical history for the University of London, in Greek for the University of Liverpool, 1915–1919, and in theology for the University of Durham, 1921–1923. Greenup was the Examining Chaplain for the Bishop of Chelmsford 1914–1946.

He took up the role of Principal at London College of Divinity in 1899 until 1925, and was also a recognised teacher in the Theology Faculty of the University of London from 1901 until his departure from Highbury College.

He was appointed as Rector of Great Oakley in 1925 to 1931, and Professor of Biblical Languages at the Bible Churchmen's Missionary College, Bristol from 1932 to 1947.

He married Evelyn Helen Heron on 3 September 1895 in Oxford.

He died near Basingstoke in 1952, aged 85.
