= Thomas Pownall Boultbee =

English priest (1818–1884)

Thomas Pownall Boultbee, LL.D. (1818–1884), was an English clergyman.

== Life ==
Boultbee, the eldest son of Thomas Boultbee, for forty-seven years Vicar of Bidford, Warwickshire, was born on 7 Aug. 1818. He was also the nephew of John Boultbee the adventurer. He was sent to Uppingham School in 1833, which he left with an exhibition to St John's College, Cambridge. He took the degree of B.A. in 1841, as fifth wrangler. In March 1842 he was elected fellow of his college, and proceeded M.A. in 1844.

He took orders immediately; and after holding one or two curacies, and taking pupils, he became curate to the Rev. Francis Close, of Cheltenham, afterwards dean of Carlisle. From 1852 to 1863 he was theological tutor and chaplain of Cheltenham College. In 1863 he assumed the principalship of the newly instituted London College of Divinity, at first located in a private house at Kilburn, where the principal entered upon his task with a single student. Two years afterwards it was moved to St. John's Hall, Highbury, and the number of pupils rose to fifty or sixty. In 1884 the number of students in residence was sixty-eight. Boultbee took the degree of LL.D. in 1872, and in October 1883 received from the Bishop of London, Dr. John Jackson, the prebendal stall of Eadland in St. Paul's Cathedral. Boultbee died at Bournemouth on 30 Jan. 1884, and was buried at Chesham, Buckinghamshire, of which his youngest son was vicar.

== Works ==
Besides a few sermons and occasional papers, Boultbee published:

- Chronicles of Ancient Faith: Lectures on the eleventh chapter of the Epistle to the Hebrews. London, 1856.
- The Alleged Moral Difficulties of the Old Testament: a Lecture Delivered in Connection with the Christian Evidence Society. London, 1872.
- The Annual Address of the Victoria Institute, or Philosophical Society of Great Britain. London, 1873.
- A Commentary on the Thirty-nine Articles, forming an Introduction to the Theology of the Church of England. London, 1871, and other editions.
- A History of the Church of England: Pre-Reformation Period. London, 1879.
