= Plover Scar Lighthouse =

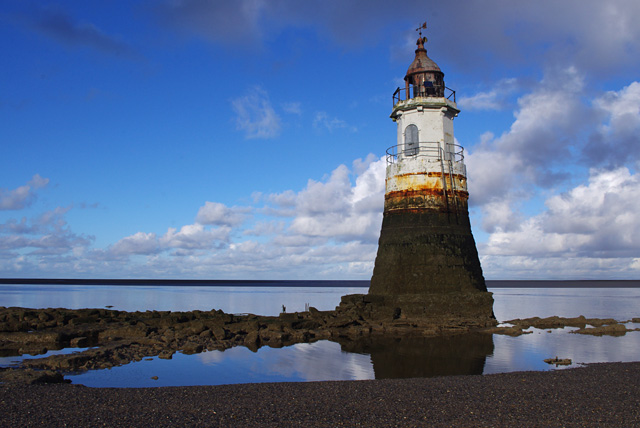
- The lighthouse at low tide in 2013
- Location: River Lune Estuary, Lancashire, England
- Coordinates: 53.981512°N 2.882594°W

Tower
- Constructed: 1847
- Construction: Stone tower
- Automated: 1951
- Height: 8 metres (26 ft)
- Shape: Octagonal tower with balcony and lantern
- Markings: White tower, black lantern
- Operator: Lancaster Port Commission

Light
- Focal height: 6 metres (20 ft)
- Range: 6 nmi (11 km; 6.9 mi)
- Characteristic: Fl W 2s.

Plover Scar Lighthouse, also known as the Abbey Lighthouse, is an active 19th century lighthouse sited at the entrance of the Lune estuary, near Cockersand Abbey in Lancashire, England. The lighthouse is maintained by the Lancaster Port Commission. It is registered under the international Admiralty number A4876 and has the NGA identifier of 114-5144.

== Description ==
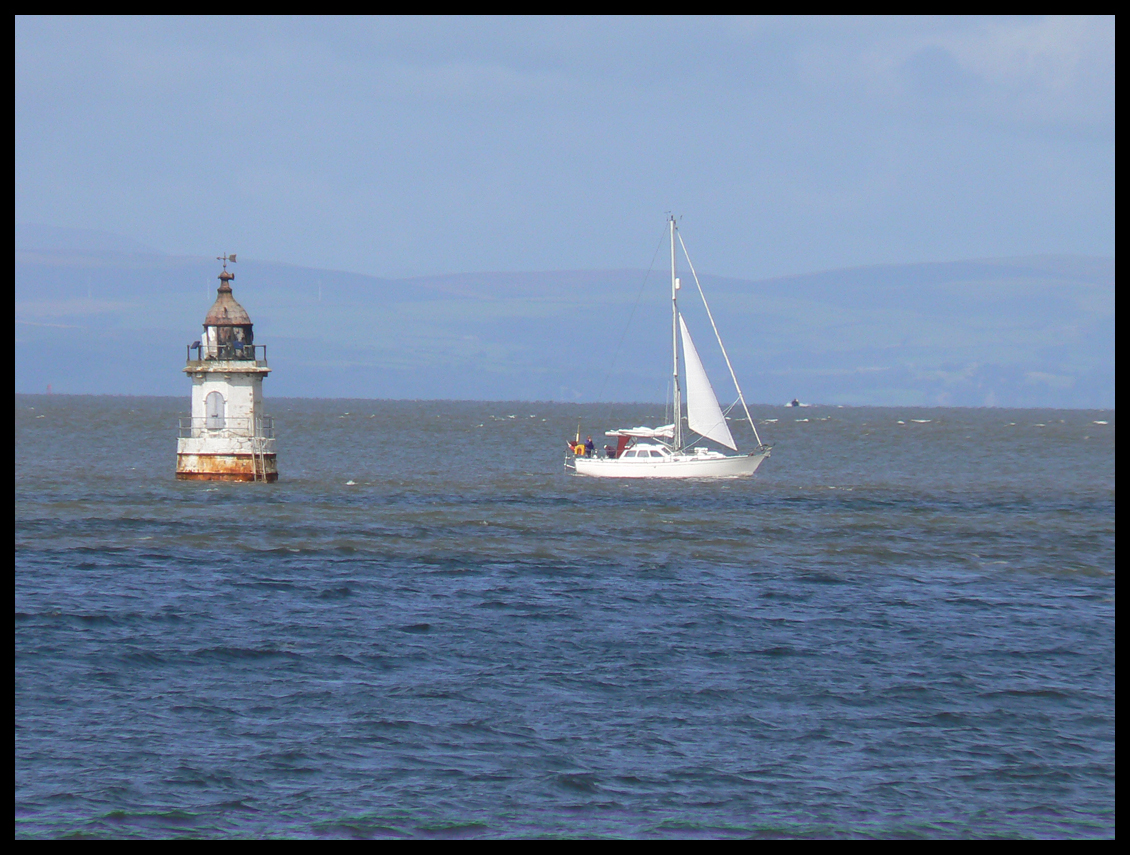
The lighthouse at high tide in 2009

The lighthouse consists of an 8-metre-high (26 ft) white conical stone tower, with a black lantern and twin galleries, built on a rock ledge that is uncovered at low tide.

With a focal height of 6m above sea level, the light can be seen for six nautical miles. Its light characteristic is made up of a flash of white light every two seconds.

== History ==
The lighthouse was built in 1847, as the lower light of a pair of leading lights; therefore, it is also called the front or Low Light. The rear or High Light, known as Cockersand Lighthouse, once stood next to the Abbey Lighthouse cottage on Slack Lane. It was a square wooden tower supported by angled wooden struts. The leading lights helped ships navigate into the Lune estuary, to reach Glasson Dock and then onwards via the Lancaster Canal to the port of Lancaster, with Plover Scar marking the rocky outcrop at the edge of the deep water channel into the estuary. Both lighthouses were equipped with a pair of paraffin lamps mounted in parabolic reflectors, each displaying fixed light seawards. In the early 1950s, electric lamps replaced the oil lanterns; at the same time the wooden High Light was replaced by a metal framework tower. By the end of the decade, the lights were fully automated; the High Light was deactivated some time after 1985 but Plover Scar remains active.

=== Keepers ===
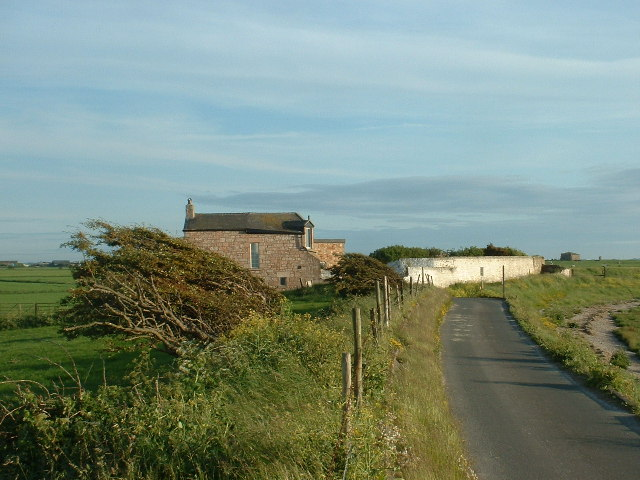
Former keepers' cottage at the site of the demolished Cockersand light

Prior to automation, the lighthouse keepers and their families lived in the lighthouse cottage next to the Cockersand lighthouse. Originally the accommodation was incorporated into the base of the lighthouse structure, but was later replaced by the cottage that still stands today. The keepers maintained both lighthouses, walking across to Plover Scar at low tide. The Raby family kept the lights for nearly a century, until 1945 when it was taken over by the Parkinson family. Mrs. Parkinson was filmed maintaining the lights in 1948 by the British Pathé news organisation.

== 2016 collision damage ==
In March 2016, the lighthouse was badly damaged when it was struck by a passing commercial vessel, which was navigating its way at night to Glasson Dock. The collision dislodged the upper part of the tower, and although the light continued to operate, substantial reconstruction of the tower was deemed necessary. The subsequent repairs which started in September 2016 meant the stone tower had to be partially dismantled, with the lantern removed for renovation. Over 200 stone blocks from the dismantled tower were taken to a work site on the beach and numbered so that they could be reused when the light was rebuilt. The works also revealed that an extra outer layer of stones had been built around the tower, which had been added in 1856 to create an outer walkway. Although the works were delayed by various factors, they were finally completed in May 2017.

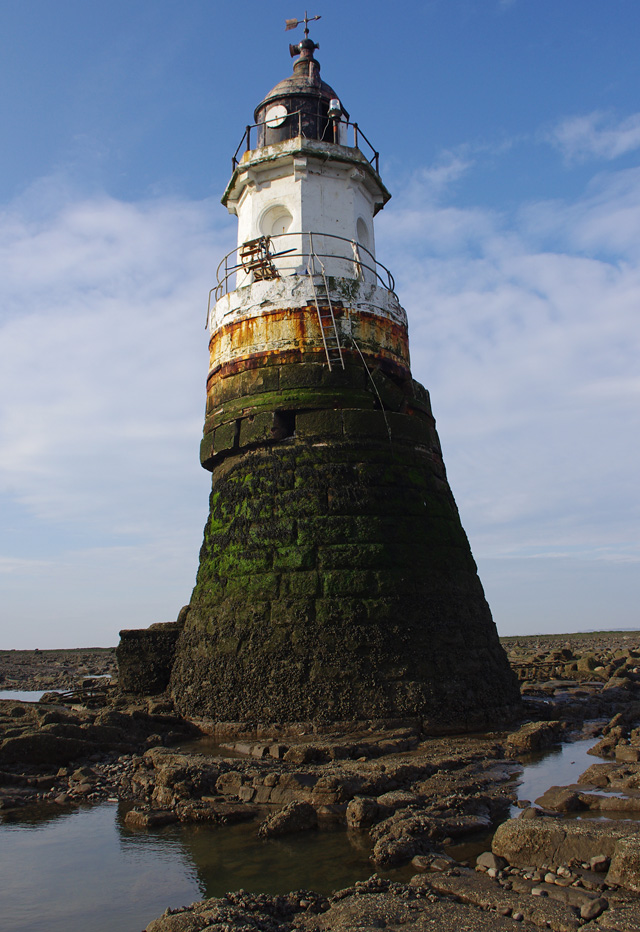
The damaged lighthouse in 2016

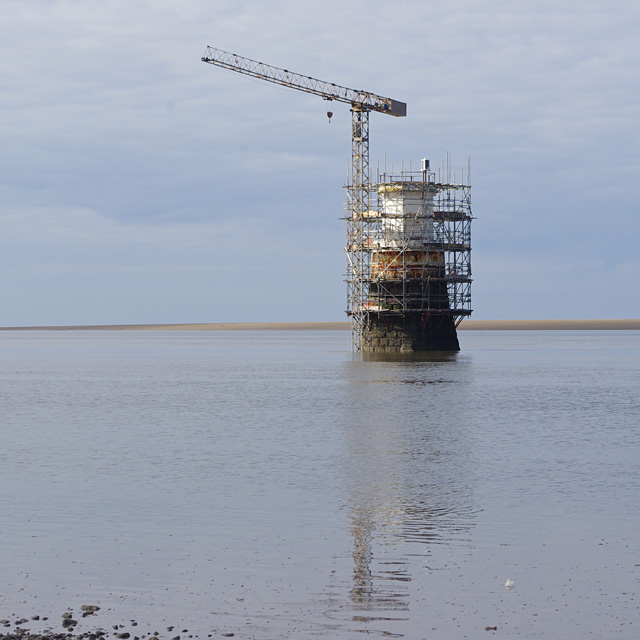
Renovation works in 2016

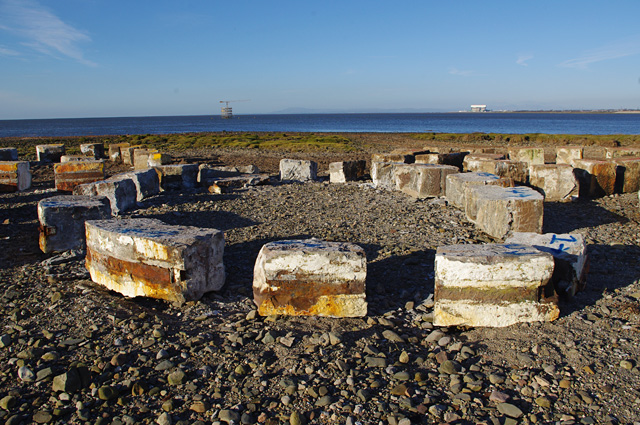
Stone blocks from the lighthouse removed during renovation

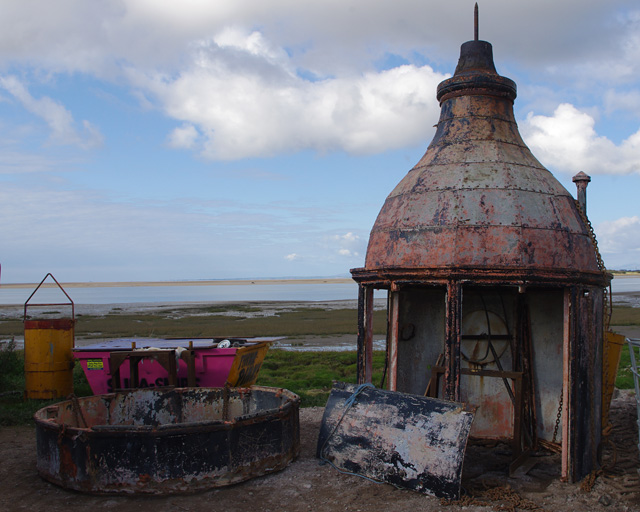
The removed lantern room prior to refurbishment

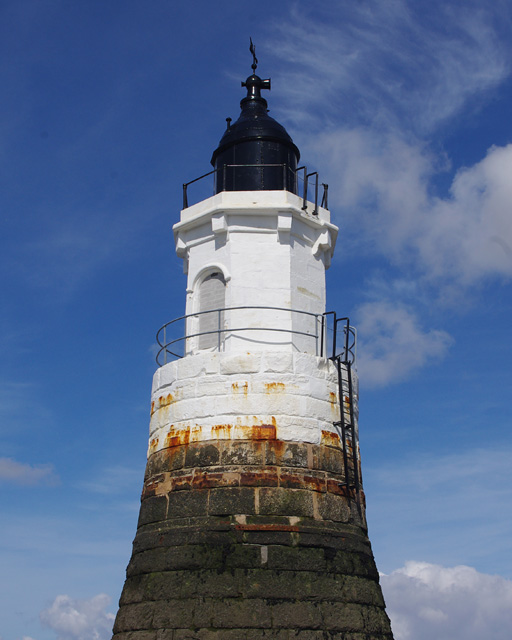
The newly-rebuilt and restored lighthouse in 2017

== See also ==
- List of lighthouses in England
- Lighthouse and naval vessel urban legend
