= USS Montana =

USS Montana may refer to:

- USS Montana (ACR-13), was a Tennessee-class cruiser that provided convoy escort duty during World War I, and was eventually renamed and reclassified Missoula (CA-13) in reserve fleet
- USS Montanan (1913), was a cargo ship during World War I and sunk by torpedo in August 1918
- USS Montana (BB-51), was a South Dakota-class battleship laid down in 1920 but cancelled and scrapped in 1923
- USS Montana (BB-67), would have been the lead ship of the Montana-class battleships; however, the entire class was cancelled in 1943
- USS Montana (SSN-794), is a Virginia-class submarine
