= Licensed lay minister =

Non-clerical Anglican worship leader

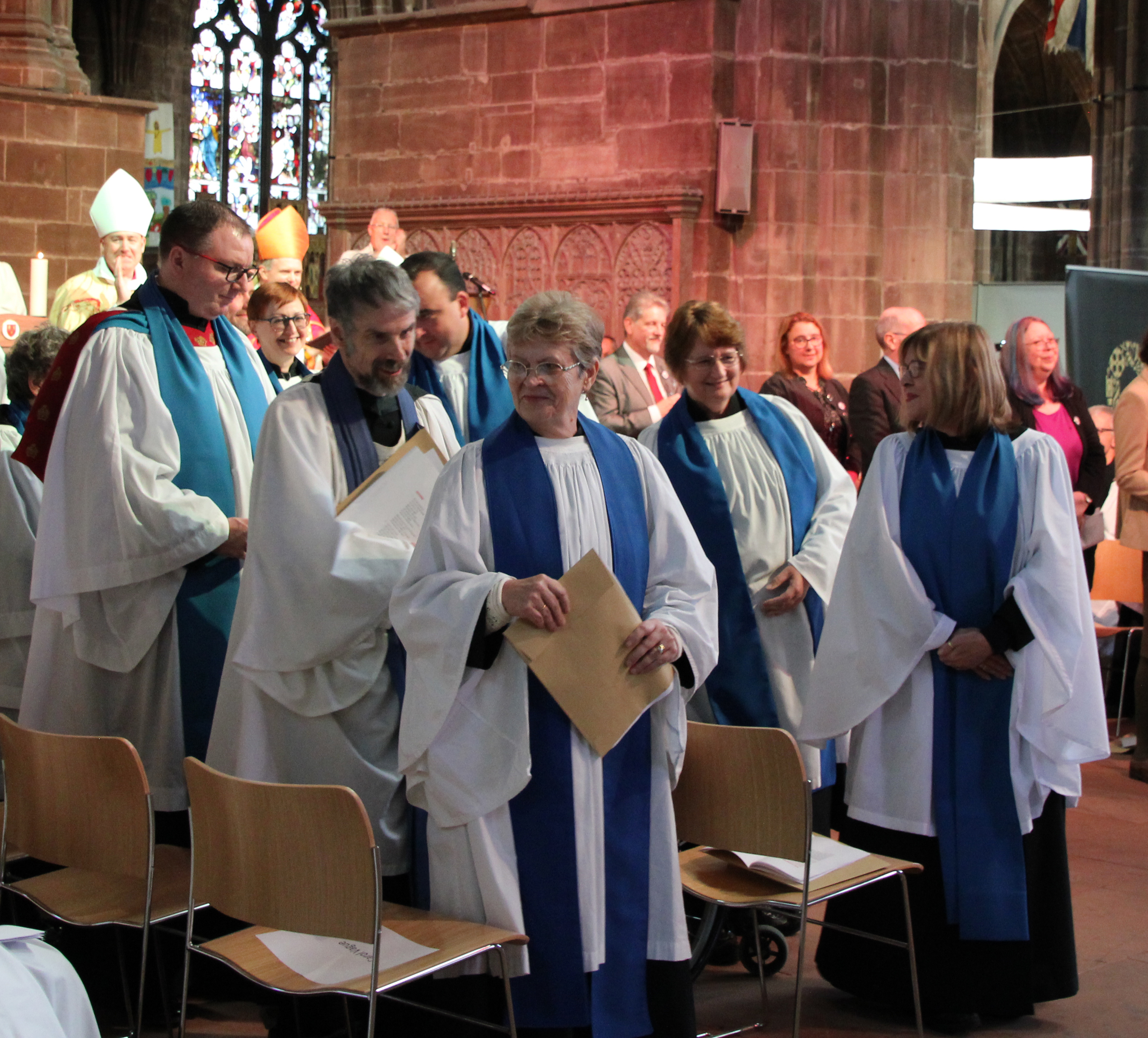
Lay readers at Chester Cathedral

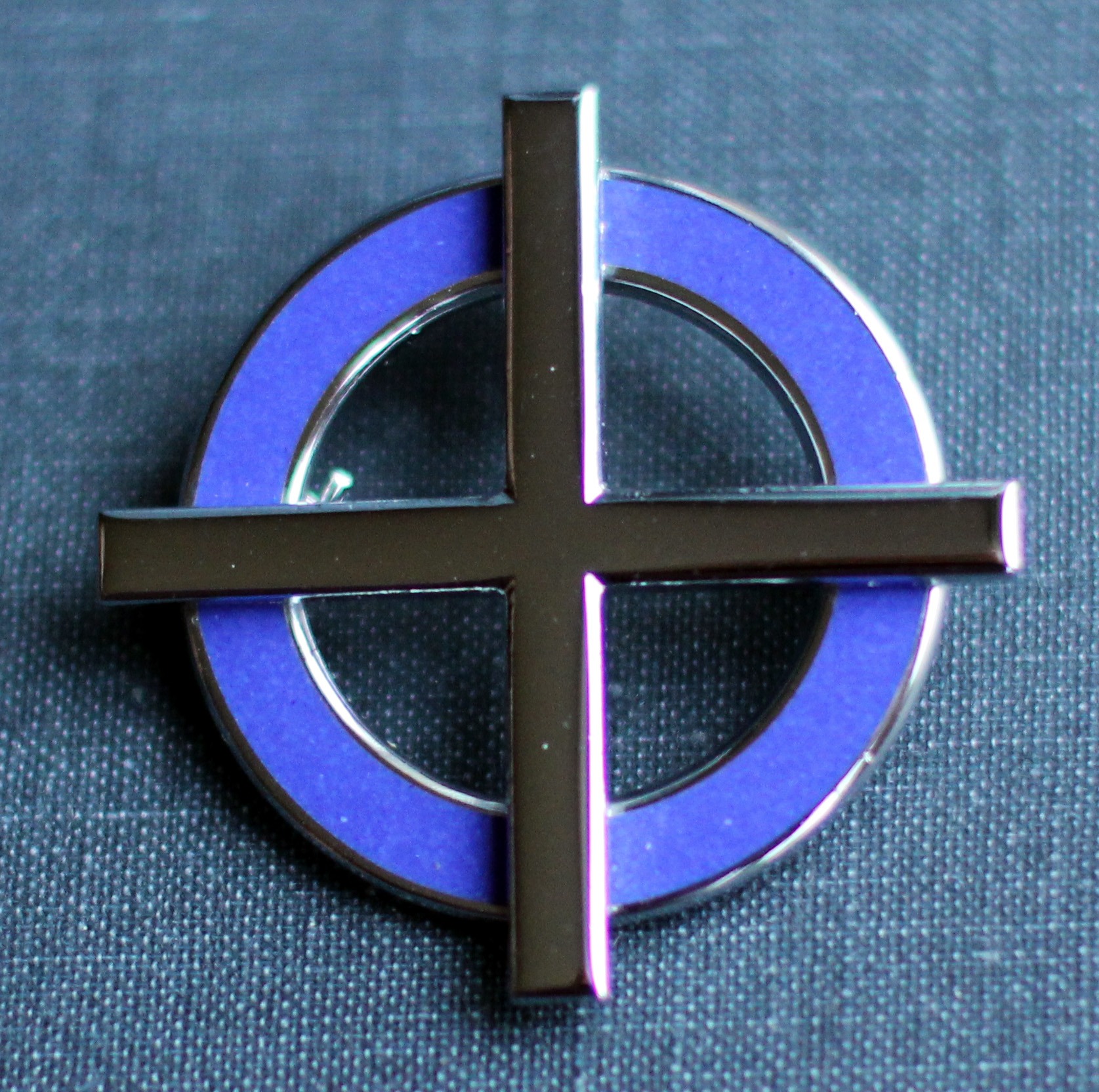
Badge sometimes worn by licensed lay ministers

In Anglicanism, a licensed lay minister (LLM) or lay reader (in some jurisdictions simply reader) is a person authorised by a bishop to lead certain services of worship (or parts of the service), to preach and to carry out pastoral and teaching functions. They are formally trained and admitted to the office, but they remain part of the laity, not of the clergy.

== History ==
=== Ancient office of reader ===
From the third century the office of reader (or lector) became recognised as one of the minor orders of the clerical state. Candidates for ordained ministry (as deacons and priests) were first admitted to the sequence of minor orders, including that of lector or reader. The minor orders have been largely absent from the Anglican Church since the Reformation (with some localised exceptions) and in the Roman Catholic Church they have also been suppressed. However, the "ministry of reader" (in the Roman Catholic Church) and the office of reader or lay reader (in the Anglican Church) represent a continuation of the reader tradition.

=== Modern revival ===
The office of Reader has existed in its present form since 1866. Reader ministry was originally restricted to men only. The first female readers were licensed during the First World War due to the shortage of men. The first group of women admitted were called "bishop's messengers" and they existed in 22 dioceses in England and one diocese in Canada. After the war there was a gap until 1969 when more female readers were appointed.

There are now many thousands of readers in the Anglican churches, including around ten thousand in the Church of England and around 300 in the Church of Ireland. They are equally split between women and men.

=== Relationship to holy orders ===
In the Roman Catholic Church, candidates for ordination as a deacon must first have been admitted to the ministry of reader (Canon 1035). Whilst Anglican canon law has no such requirement, the canons of some provinces of the Anglican Communion allow for ordination candidates to be admitted as readers as part of their preparation for ordination as a deacon; this practice is common, for example, in the Church of Ireland where ordination candidates so admitted are known as student readers; the student reader's licence permits them to serve in any diocese rather than being bound (as in the case of diocesan readers) solely to the diocese of their licensing bishop.

== Term ==
Following a Church of England working party report to the General Synod in 2009 most English dioceses have adopted the term "licensed lay minister".

Where the terms "reader" and "lay reader" are still in common use, they are largely interchangeable. The original term in the Church of England was simply "reader", but "lay reader" is an early and common colloquialism, which has come to have official force in some parts of the Anglican Communion.

In the Church of England the governing Canon E5 still references the office by the single word "reader". In the Scottish Episcopal Church the governing Canon 20 always refers to the office by the two-word term "lay reader". In the Church of Ireland the generic term used is "reader", but usually qualified as "diocesan reader" or, in the case of those admitted as part of their preparation for ordination, "student reader" (see above).

== Admission ==
Following training (usually over several years) a candidate is publicly admitted as a licensed lay minister or reader by the bishop. Standards of training and forms of admission are regulated by the Anglican Consultative Council and by the Canons of each province.

Lay readers are usually admitted during a celebration of the Eucharist. As part of the rite they are presented with a copy of the New Testament (CofE Canon E5[5]) and a certificate of admission to the office of reader (CofE Canon E5[6]). In most provinces they are also clothed with a blue tippet over their cassock and surplice.

Admission as a licensed lay minister is a once-only and permanent rite. However, like clergy, lay ministers must be relicensed if they move between parishes or dioceses (CofE Canon E6), but they are not again admitted to the office of lay minister as their original admission is a permanent act (CofE Canon E5[6]).

== Role and duties ==
Anglican lay ministers are licensed by the bishop to a particular parish or to the diocese at large. The vast majority of lay ministers are volunteers, although a small number are stipendiary ministers (paid to work full time) and the canons of the Church of England make provision for the terms of employment and service of a stipendiary lay minister.

The role, whose prominence varies by region, bears many similarities to both the traditional liturgical role of reader in the historic Catholic rites of the church and the role of lay preacher found in many non-conformist denominations.

The role can involve:

- Conducting the Daily Office (Mattins, Evensong, Compline) or other non-sacramental services
- Reciting the Litany
- Publishing banns of marriage
- Preaching, teaching, and assisting in pastoral care
- Distributing (though not presiding at) Holy Communion.
- Participation at other services as requested by their incumbent
- In some cases the role may include conducting funerals

In many parishes a lay reader may carry out liturgical functions at the Eucharist similar to the role of the liturgical deacon; in parishes of Anglo-Catholic tradition a lay reader may vest and act as subdeacon at Solemn Mass.

Many of these duties can be performed by any reasonably competent lay person who has been properly instructed, but a lay reader is licensed to perform them as part of a wider leadership role, following extensive training. This training and licensing elevates the reader to a particular ministerial role and function recognised as being distinct from the parish-based lay leadership of local congregational volunteers.

Their theological training enables them to preach, teach, and lead worship, and they are also able to assist in pastoral, evangelistic and liturgical work.

== Training ==
Training to become a reader is rigorous and follows a period of testing and preparation. In many dioceses this involves some form of access training that introduces the concept of theological reflection as well as the nature of ministry. All potential readers attend a diocesan advisory panel to test their calling and assess their suitability for the role. The recommendations from this are communicated to the parochial church council (PCC) in the candidate's own parish, which must confirm that it will support the candidate during training and will agree to the candidate going forward for licensing. Training takes place over one to three years (depending on prior theological training) at a local theological college and is often shared with ordinands and those preparing for other types of ministry. Reader training in the Church of England is overseen by the University of Durham and most candidates study for a Cert Ed or diploma in theology. All readers will have a working agreement in place which is agreed with their incumbent. This outlines their duties and aims to promote a balance between their work and family commitments. Candidates may undergo a placement in a parish other than their home parish to gain broader experience.

Reader training usually incorporates a selection of the following and this can vary across training colleges

- Old Testament
- New Testament
- Christian theology
- Liturgy and worship
- Pastoral care
- Study of local context
- Mission
- Spirituality
- Ethics
- The nature of Christian salvation
- Church history
- Leadership skills and self-awareness (usually a Myers Briggs workshop)
- Ministry to the dying and bereaved
- Preaching skills

As well as this there are also practical skills that are learnt within the home parish such as leading worship and preaching. At the end of training the PCC has to agree to the candidate going forward for licensing. The candidate is licensed as well as admitted to the Order of Readers at a service in their local cathedral. The following day their licence is read in their home church and the new reader preaches at that service.

== Notable lay readers ==
- Arthur Addison, Australian politician
- Cass Ballenger, American politician
- Christina Baxter, British theologian and academic
- Ronald Blythe, British writer and centenarian
- Kendal Chavasse, decorated British Army officer
- Vernon Corea, Sri Lankan-British radio broadcaster
- Major General Tim Cross, British Army officer
- Sir William Fittall, Secretary-General of the General Synod of the Church of England
- Philip Fletcher, British public servant
- Sydney Gedge, British politician
- Paula Gooder, British theologian
- Edwin Ray Guthrie, American behavioural psychologist
- Ihaka Hakuene, Māori leader
- John Wodehouse, 5th Earl of Kimberley, British peer
- Christopher C. Kraft Jr., American aerospace engineer and NASA engineer
- Sir Ted Leather, Governor of Bermuda
- Fritz Leiber, American author
- Ann Moss, British scholar of French literature
- Alfred Owen, British industrialist
- James R. Parsons, South Australian educator
- Ike Robin, New Zealand sportsman
- H. W. F. Saggs, British Assyriologist
- Robert Sands Schuyler, American architect
- Robert John Sholl, settler of Western Australia
- Paraire Tomoana, Māori leader, journalist, historian, and sportsman
- Richard Wilbur, American poet

== See also ==
- Clergy
- Laity
- Lay speaker
- Methodist local preacher
- Reader (liturgy)
