= Phil Cooke =

American writer and television producer

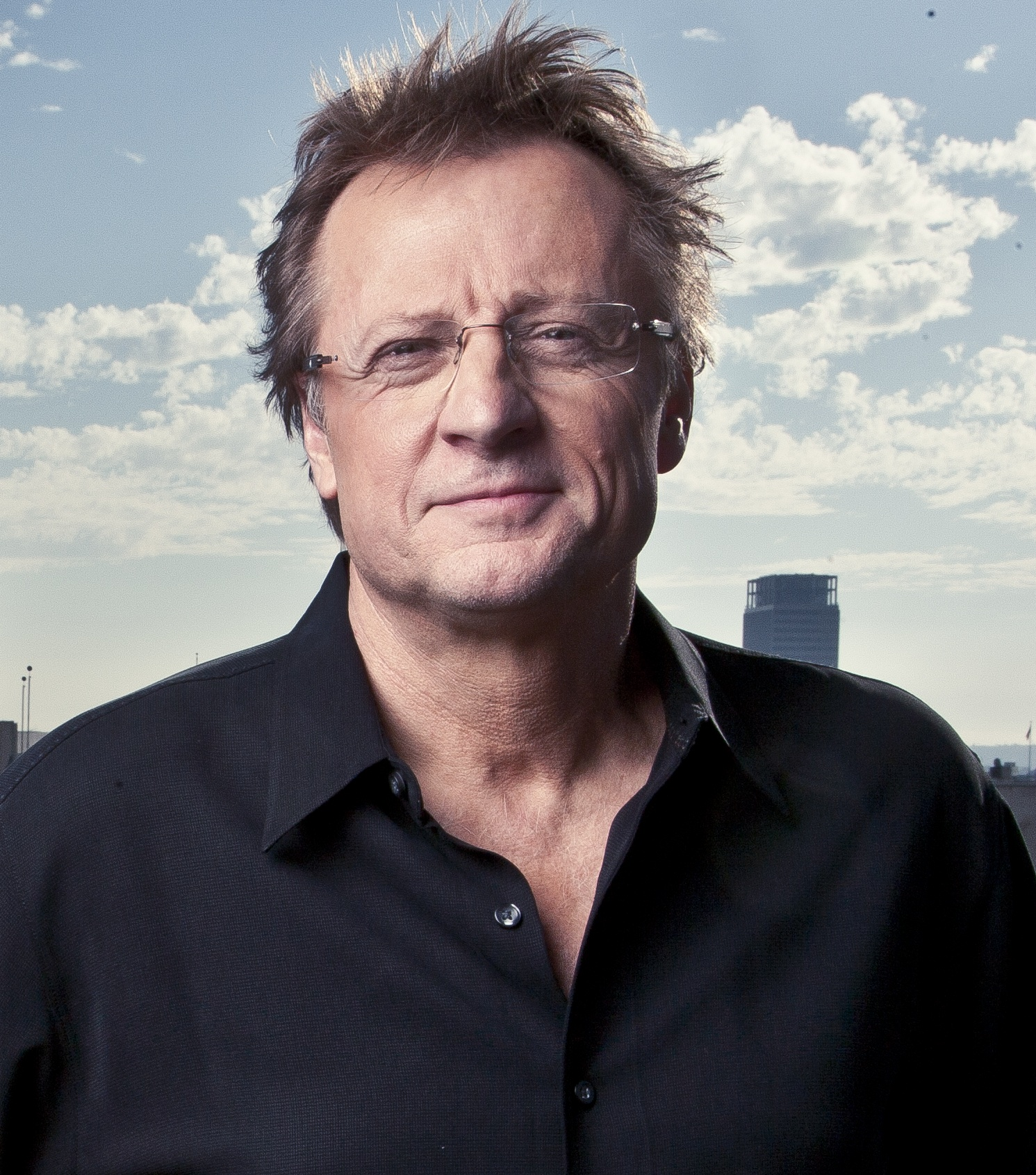
- Born: August 31, 1954 (age 72); Charlotte, North Carolina, U.S.
- Education: Oral Roberts University; University of Oklahoma; Trinity College and Seminary
- Occupations: Media consultant, producer, speaker, author
- Years active: 1977–present
- Spouse: Kathleen Paille (m. 1977)
- Children: 2

Phil Cooke (born August 31, 1954) is an American writer, television producer, and media consultant based in Burbank, California, as well as a critic and commentator on contemporary American and American-influenced Christian culture. He is an evangelical Christian and, as Scott McClellan of Collide Magazine wrote, "At times, Cooke may appear to be Christian media's biggest critic but, as he is quick to point out, he criticizes because he loves."

Cooke, with his wife Kathleen, founded Cooke Media Group in 1991. Cooke was a co-founder of TWC Films, which produced two 2008 Super Bowl commercials.

== Early life ==
Cooke was born on August 31, 1954, in Charlotte, NC. His father, Bill Cooke, is a preacher originally from Kannapolis, NC. His mother, Thelma Blackwelder Cooke, was a homemaker.

Phil attributes his career path to a movie he made in high school, which he played for his fellow students at Oral Roberts University. When the response was positive, he left his music major behind and got his degree in Film and Television in 1976. He later earned a Master's in Journalism from the University of Oklahoma, and a doctorate through distance learning from Trinity College and Seminary in Indiana.

== Career ==
Cooke is known in Christian circles as an advocate of faith branding, encouraging Christian organizations and leaders to change how churches communicate their message in a media-centric world. One of Cooke's main criticisms of contemporary U.S. "Christian culture" is its lack of creativity. He is firmly against what he describes as the "bubble" that the Christian subculture is in, as it is focused on developing its own music, books, and movies that do not engage the culture at large.

=== Cooke Media Group ===
Cooke Media Group is the media production company founded by Phil and Kathleen Cooke in 1991. Located in Burbank, California, the Cooke Media Group provides film production, communications and marketing services to Christian organizations.

=== Writing ===
Cooke wrote two books on Christian media: Branding Faith: Why Some Churches and Non-Profits Impact Culture and Others Don't, and The Last TV Evangelist: Why the Next Generation Couldn't Care Less About Religious Media and Why It Matters. In The Last TV Evangelist, Cooke argued that scandals and a shift in media consumption has spelled the end for what has been known as "traditional" Christian media. Cooke has written a number of books on faith, finding purpose, religious media, and branding.

== Sources ==
- Ireland, Michael; "Media expert with a theology degree helps Christians hone their message and tell their stories of faith"; Across Pacific Magazine
- Wegner, Rachel; "Faith, Culture, and Other Mysteries"; ORU Report, Fall 2008
