= John Boultbee (explorer) =

English explorer (1799–1854)

John Boultbee (3 September 1799 – 1854) was an English explorer.

== Early life ==
He was born at Bunny, Nottinghamshire as the ninth and youngest son of Sarah Elizabeth Lane and her husband, Joseph Boultbee, minor Nottinghamshire gentry.

== Adventurer ==
By 1816, Boultbee was bound for Brazil. He was in Barbados in 1818, intending to be a planter, but left after four months, sickened by the cruelties of slavery. He emigrated to Van Diemen's Land (Tasmania) with his brother Edwin in 1823, and dreamed of reaching that 'second Elysium', Tahiti. The reality was the hard life of a sealer. so after two years and considerable privations in Bass Strait, in March 1826 he sailed for southern New Zealand. By March 1828 he was back in Port Jackson (Sydney), toiling at ship ballasting and fish-curing. He went to the new Swan River settlement in Western Australia in 1829, and then in January 1833 joined a whaler bound for Timor. After visits to the Philippines and Singapore, he arrived at Ceylon (Sri Lanka) in May 1834, remaining there until his death, probably in 1854. He compiled his 'Journal of a rambler', an account of his life from 1817 to 1834, in Ceylon about 1835.

== Travels in New Zealand ==
His New Zealand travels began in Port Jackson in March 1826 when he joined a sealing party employed by Daniel Cooper and Solomon Levey, and embarked on the brig Elizabeth. On 5 April the ship anchored in George Sound, and boat crews and provisions were landed. Boultbee was assigned to a boat carrying six weeks' victuals, three muskets, a dog and clothing, which headed 'about 100 miles to the Northward'. Reaching 'wild romantic looking' Milford Sound the first day, they found game aplenty including weka, kākāpō and kiwi. They visited Cascade Point, and at Open Bay (Jackson Bay) saw a broken spear and flax sandals which were the first signs of Māori presence.

The party landed on the Open Bay Islands, where they found a few provisions and messages from previous visitors in a hut used by earlier sealers. Vegetables grown by the former gang made a welcome change from salt fare. Sealing went on apace: the first haul was made from a rock chimney, and more seals were obtained on an island off the mouth of the Paringa River. A constant watch was kept against surprise attack. Boultbee related that Māori refugees from Banks Peninsula, were plundering and killing boat crews around the southern coast. An attack came at what is now Arnott Point. Boultbee laid about him with an oar while others loaded and fired guns, and the dog bit as the boat was launched for a get-away. There were casualties on both sides.

Boultbee' recounted wet, miserable nights, good crayfishing, reunion with two other boat crews at Milford Sound, and an exciting run before a gale to Dusky Sound. A blazing fire, flapjacks, pork and a singsong restored everyone's spirits. When an accidental musket-shot narrowly missed Boultbee, he comforted himself with a reflection on 'the timely interposition of Providence which thus preserved me.' A narrow escape from a runaway log was another manifestation of 'Divine Mercy'. He noted that he was much changed from 'the delicate youth' he had been, and was now 'as rough a piece of goods as ever weathered the wide world'. The rest of the crew, watching his busy pen as he wrote his journal, regarded him as 'a regular scholard', an incongruous, educated presence in a mostly illiterate company.

Some months were spent in Dusky Sound before the Elizabeth returned with provisions and clothing, on its way to Foveaux Strait. Boultbee's boat followed the Elizabeth after a few days, reaching Pahia, the westernmost Māori settlement on the southern coastline, where the crew were welcomed by Jacky Price and his consort, Hinewhitia. Boultbee joined whole-heartedly in the communal life. There were trips across the strait to The Neck on Stewart Island / Rakiura and to Ruapuke Island. Bluff, Omaui, Wakapatu, Te Waewae, Codfish Island, are all vividly described in terms of the occupants' lives, their customs and language. Boultbee's ear for language was acute, and he compiled an extensive vocabulary of Māori expressions. His portraits of the chiefs Te Whakataupuka of Ruapuke and the dying Te Wera of Bluff, among others, are a valuable addition to our knowledge. If wanderlust had not kept him on the move, he might have accepted Te Whakataupuka's invitation to remain on Ruapuke.

Boultbee joined a sealing gang from the Samuel, and stowed away on the ship at Paterson Inlet, landing penniless in Port Jackson on 8 March 1828. His journal was compiled 'more for the amusement of my relations and friends, than with a view to that of the Public', but his first-hand account of the sealing industry on New Zealand's southern coasts is a rare and vital record of a trade cloaked in the secrecy of competition.

== Fictional works ==
Boultbee's New Zealand journal was adapted into a one-man play by Brian Potiki.
