= Sarratt =

Village in Hertfordshire, England

Coordinates: 51.683603°N 0.487523°W

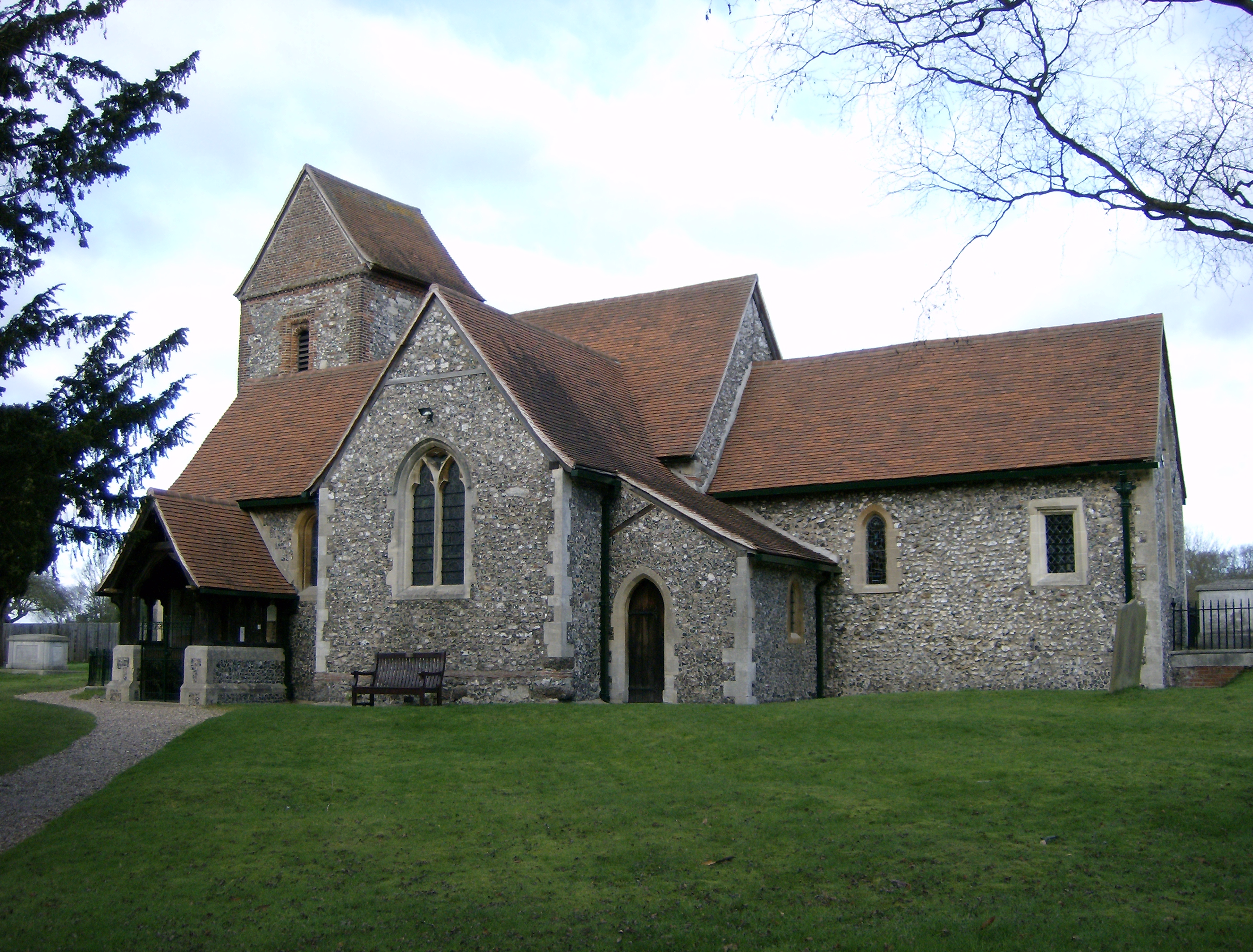
- Church of the Holy Cross, Sarratt

- Location within Hertfordshire
- Population: 924 (2001 census); 1,849 (2011 Census)
- OS grid reference: TQ045994
- District: Three Rivers
- Shire county: Hertfordshire
- Region: East
- Country: England
- Sovereign state: United Kingdom
- Post town: Rickmansworth
- Postcode district: WD3
- Dialling code: 01923
- Police: Hertfordshire
- Fire: Hertfordshire
- Ambulance: East of England
- UK Parliament: South West Hertfordshire

Sarratt is a village and civil parish in Three Rivers District, Hertfordshire, England. It is situated 4 miles (6.4 km) north of Rickmansworth near the border with Buckinghamshire. The chalk stream, the River Chess, rising just north of Chesham in the Chiltern Hills, passes through Sarratt Bottom in the valley to the west of the village to join the River Colne in Rickmansworth. The conditions offered by the river are optimal for cultivating watercress. Sarratt has the only commercially operating watercress farm in Hertfordshire. The valley to the east of Sarratt is dry.

== Church and chapel ==
The parish church of Sarratt is the Church of the Holy Cross. Founded c. 1190, construction is flint-and-brick built with, reputedly, reused Roman tiles.

From the 17th century a large linear village developed nearly 1 mile (1.6 km) away. Nowadays, this area is referred to as Sarratt Green and the area around the church is known as Church End. The village also included a Baptist Chapel and an independent Providence Mission Hall; both closed and converted into private residences.

== Motorway ==
When the M25 London orbital motorway – widened in 2011 to eight lanes (four each way) – passes Sarratt, it is less than 1 mile (1.6 km) distant at its nearest point, the bridge carrying Sarratt Road.

Junction 18 (M25) is on the Chorleywood Road (the A404) only 2 miles (3.2 km) by road from the village.

== Schools ==
Sarratt's Church of England school, situated near the junction of Church Lane and The Green, is the village's primary school with 160 – 170 pupils. In December 2015 Ofsted inspected the school and judged it to be good across the board, having been rated inadequate since December 2014.

Sarratt Ducklings, an independent pre-school for children aged from 2 to 4, located in the grounds of Sarratt Primary School, is a registered charity. It was judged outstanding by Ofsted in 2015.

== Fiction and filming ==
In some of the early novels of John le Carré, Sarratt is the location of a fictional agent-training school and interrogation centre for the British foreign intelligence service, which is nicknamed 'the Nursery'. Le Carré and Mikhail Lyubimov, a former KGB colonel, contributed to a book published by Village Books in 1999 as a fund-raiser for village charities titled, Sarratt and the Draper of Watford.

Sarratt has been used as a location in television and film productions, including:

- Murder Most Foul (1964 film) with Margaret Rutherford as Miss Marple
- Tightrope (ATV, 1971) children's espionage series written by Victor Pemberton
- Four Weddings and a Funeral (1994 film)
- The Demon Headmaster (BBC TV) second series of children's drama series
- Just William (BBC TV) children's drama series
- The Woman In Black (1989 film)
- Tinker Tailor Soldier Spy (2011 film)
- Pudsey the Dog: The Movie (2014 film)
- All the Money in the World (2017 film)

== Notable people ==
- Sydney Valentine, actor, lived at Pear Tree Cottage, Sarratt.

== Freedom of the Parish ==
People and military units who have received the Freedom of the Parish of Sarratt.

- Carol Chorley: 10 December 2019.
