= Arthur T. F. Reynolds =

British Protestant Christian missionary

Arthur Reynolds (1909–2001) was a British Protestant Christian missionary in China (1933–1951) and Japan (1952–1970) under the auspices of the China Inland Mission, which later became the Overseas Missionary Fellowship (now OMF International). He published a number of books, some of which he authored and some of which he translated from the Chinese.

Arthur Reynolds was born in Chesham, Buckinghamshire, England, to Thomas Frederick Reynolds, boot clicker, and Edith Emily Reynolds, school teacher. He attended Dr Challoner's Grammar School in Amersham. On leaving school, Arthur Reynolds worked in the telephone section of the General Post Office before applying to the China Inland Mission (CIM) for work in China. He left for China on 29 September 1933 and after language training, was sent to work in the province of Shanxi.

The Second World War meant that he did not return to England for furlough until 1944. It was during this furlough that he went to Wellingborough, Northants, to speak at a missionary meeting and there met Joy Callis, only daughter of Henry and Rhoda Callis, who was to become his wife.

After Reynolds returned to China, Joy Callis followed, sent as a missionary in her own right, also with CIM. They married in 1948 and settled in Chongqing and two sons were born to them there, before the Communist advance forced them out of China and they went to work in Japan in 1952.

Church-planting, evangelistic work was done in Anegasaki in a first term in Japan, during which a daughter and another son were born. Another daughter was born later in England.

During the 1960s, Arthur and Joy Reynolds were seconded for a while to the Central Japan Pioneer Mission (CJPM), before returning to work with OMF in Sapporo, where Arthur became principal of the Hokkaido Bible Institute and lectured in Homiletics, amongst other subjects.

During these years, he had published in Japanese a book called Sermon Preparation, and served as vice-president of the Japan Evangelical Missionary Association (JEMA) and Assistant Editor of Japan Harvest, the quarterly magazine of JEMA.

Arthur and his wife were forced into early retirement from missionary work in 1971 due to Arthur's angina. In retirement they settled in Wallington, Surrey.

During retirement, Reynolds was part-time Teacher and Chaplain at the Abbey Christian School (Abbey Road, London), a school for prospective missionaries to learn English as a foreign language, translated the writings of Chinese Christian leader Wong Ming-Dao and worked on his magnum opus, a book on preaching, which was published in 1997 under the title ‘’Learning from Great Preachers,’’

Joy Reynolds died in 1995. Arthur Reynolds died in 2001.

== Bibliography ==
- Reynolds, Arthur (1947), Change and Challenge in China, London, China Inland Mission.
- Reynolds, Arthur (date unknown), Sermon Preparation (published in Japanese).
- Reynolds, Arthur (1968), Pathway to Glory, London, Overseas Missionary Fellowship.
- Reynolds, Arthur (1997), Learning from Great Preachers, London, Avon Books.
- Wong, Ming-Dao (1981), tr. Reynolds, Arthur, A Stone Made Smooth, Southampton, Mayflower Christian Books.
- Wong, Ming-Dao (1983), tr. Reynolds, Arthur, Spiritual Food, Southampton, Mayflower Christian Books.
- Reynolds, Arthur, tr. (1988), Strength for the Storm, Singapore, OMF.
- Wong, Ming-Dao (1989), Day by Day, Crowborough, Highland Books.
