= River Chess =

River in Buckinghamshire and Hertfordshire, England

Chess
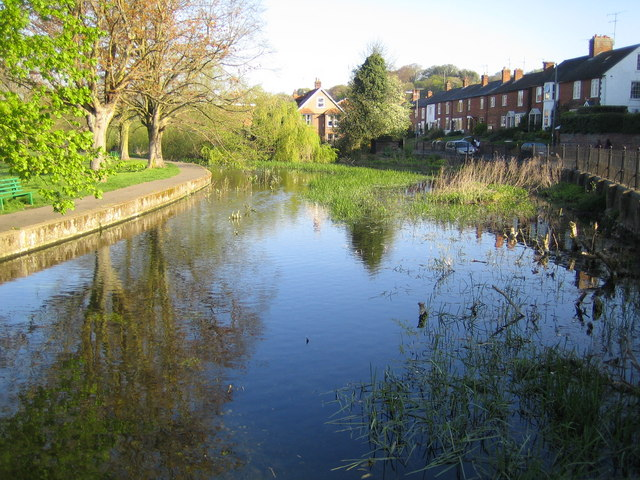
- River Chess at Waterside, Chesham

Location
- Country: England
- Counties: Buckinghamshire, Hertfordshire
- Towns/Cities: Chesham, Rickmansworth

Physical characteristics
- Source
  - location: Chesham Vale, Pednor
  - coordinates: 51°42′02″N 0°37′44″W
  - elevation: 112m
- Mouth
  - location: River Colne at Rickmansworth
  - coordinates: 51°38′06″N 0°28′0″W
  - elevation: 48m
- Length: 17.9 km (11.1 mi)

The River Chess is a chalk stream that rises near Chesham in the Chiltern Hills in England, and flows for 11 miles (18 km) through Buckinghamshire and Hertfordshire to its confluence with the River Colne in Rickmansworth. The Chess, along with the Colne and Gade, gives rise to the name of the district of Three Rivers.

== Etymology ==
The name arose by back-formation from the town of Chesham.

== River course ==
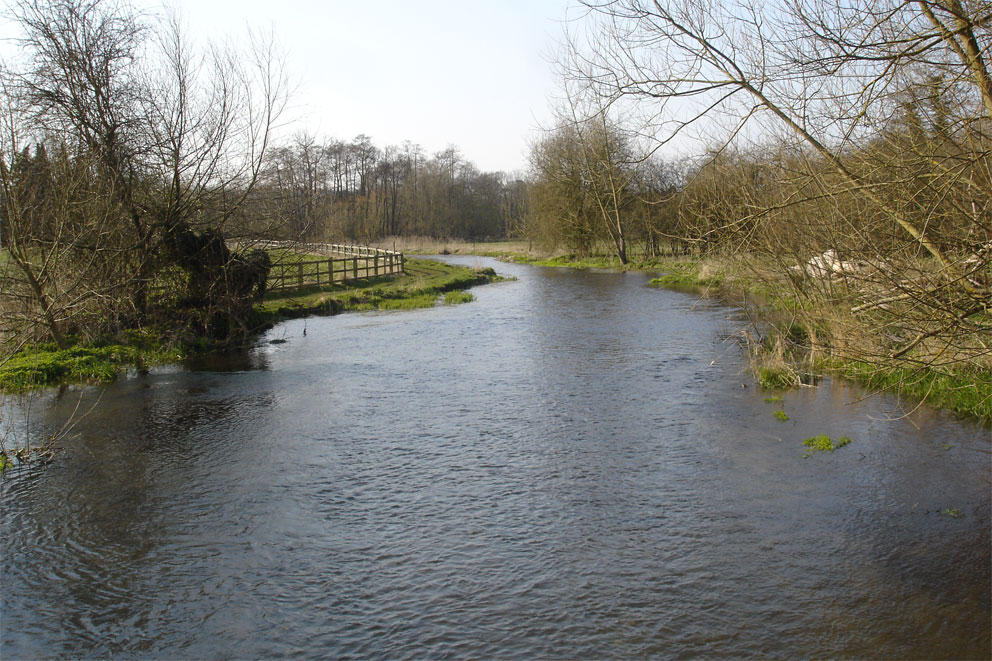
Looking upstream, at Chenies

The River Chess fall is 200 feet (60 m), and its length is 11 miles (18 km). It is fed by groundwater held in the chalk aquifer of the Chiltern Hills and rises from three springs which surface as Vale Brook, from Bury Pond, and alongside the Missenden Road near Pednor just to the north of Chesham. It flows within culverts beneath the town before flowing in a southeasterly direction through Waterside. The river flows below parkland landscaped by Capability Brown at Latimer House and the site of a 1st-century Roman villa close to the village of Latimer; to the north of Chenies; through unimproved water meadows at Frogmore and the watercress beds at Sarratt Bottom to the west of Sarratt. The Chess flows under the M25 motorway at Solesbridge Lane, before passing through the private housing estate of Loudwater, whose name was historically associated with the river at this point. Below this the river passes several disused water mills which supplied power and water for paper manufacture during the 18th and 19th centuries. At Rickmansworth it joins the River Colne to the east of the town. The river banks are mostly not public rights of way, and only small stretches of the river are accessible. It is navigable only in its lower reaches.

== Drought ==
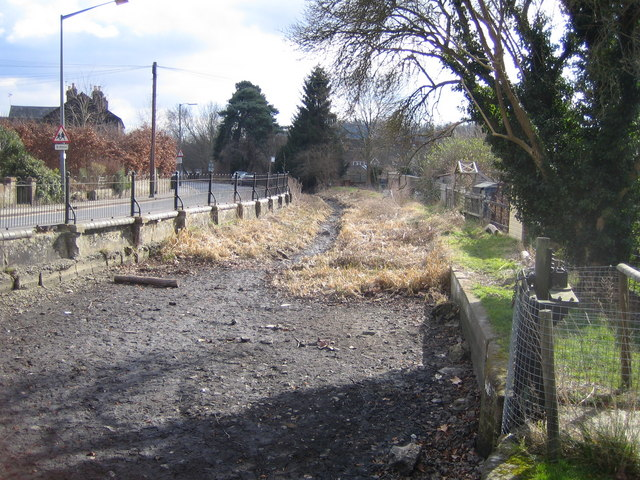
River Chess, under drought conditions, at Waterside, Chesham

The river suffered from a severe lack of water for approximately two years between 2004 and 2006 and again in 2011 and 2012. Well below average rainfall over long periods was a contributory factor. Winter rainfall is particularly important for replenishing ground water. However, the exceptional rainfall in April and June 2012 allowed the ground water to slowly rise at a time of the year when ground water levels usually start to fall. Consequently, levels in the river Chess were showing signs of improvement by July 2012.

Local speculation during the river drought of 2005 was that over-extraction for bottling, by Nestlé's Powwow Water was a significant contributing factor. Indeed, after extraction had stopped, and the river recovered somewhat, the bed was now so overgrown it was a struggle for the river to fully recover until much of the growth was removed by volunteers in 2012. In 2005 Councillor Justine Fulford campaigned to prevent the extension of the licence on the grounds that it was damaging to the local environment.

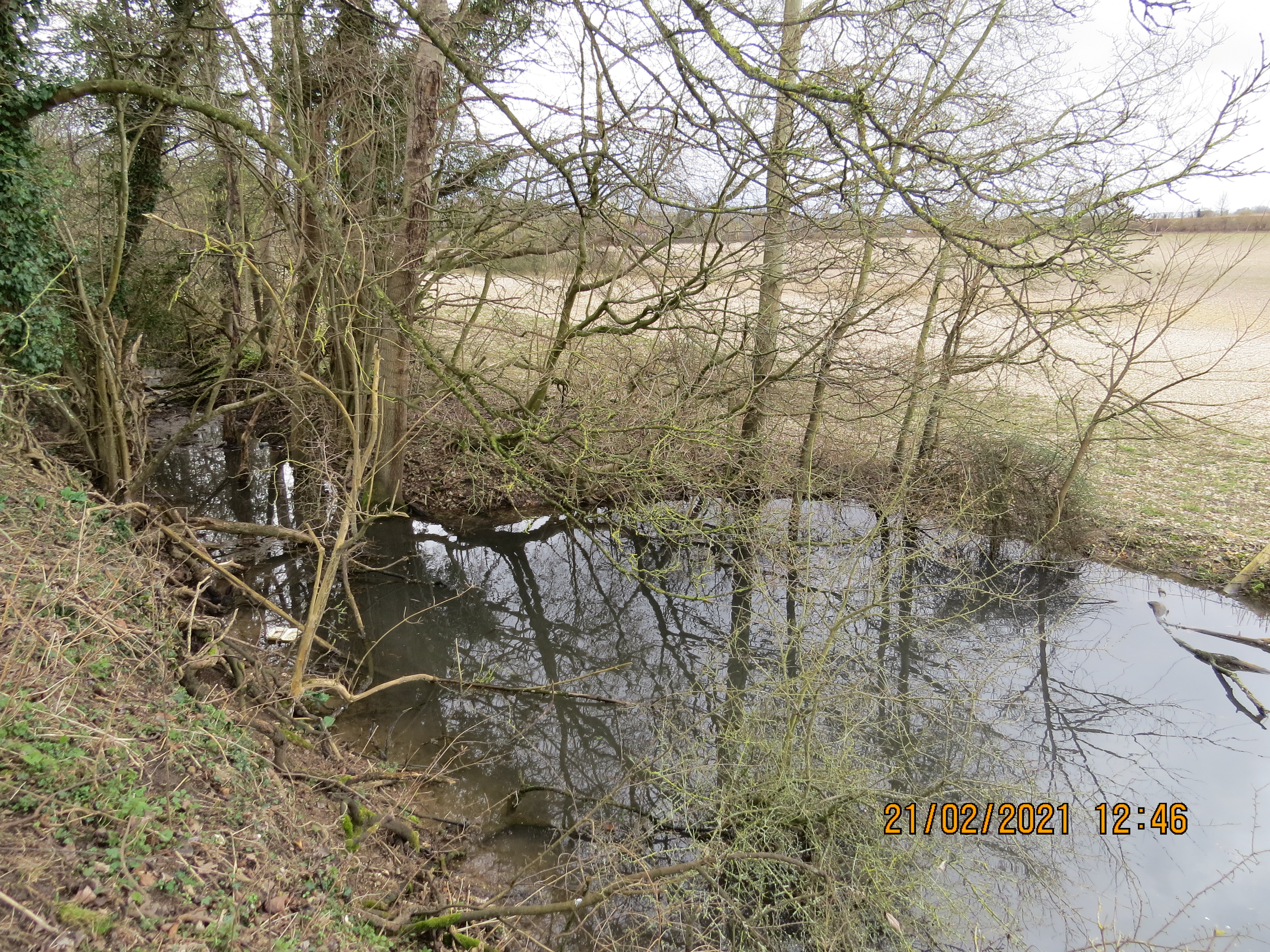
River Chess source Pednor Rd, Old Chesham, Feb 2021

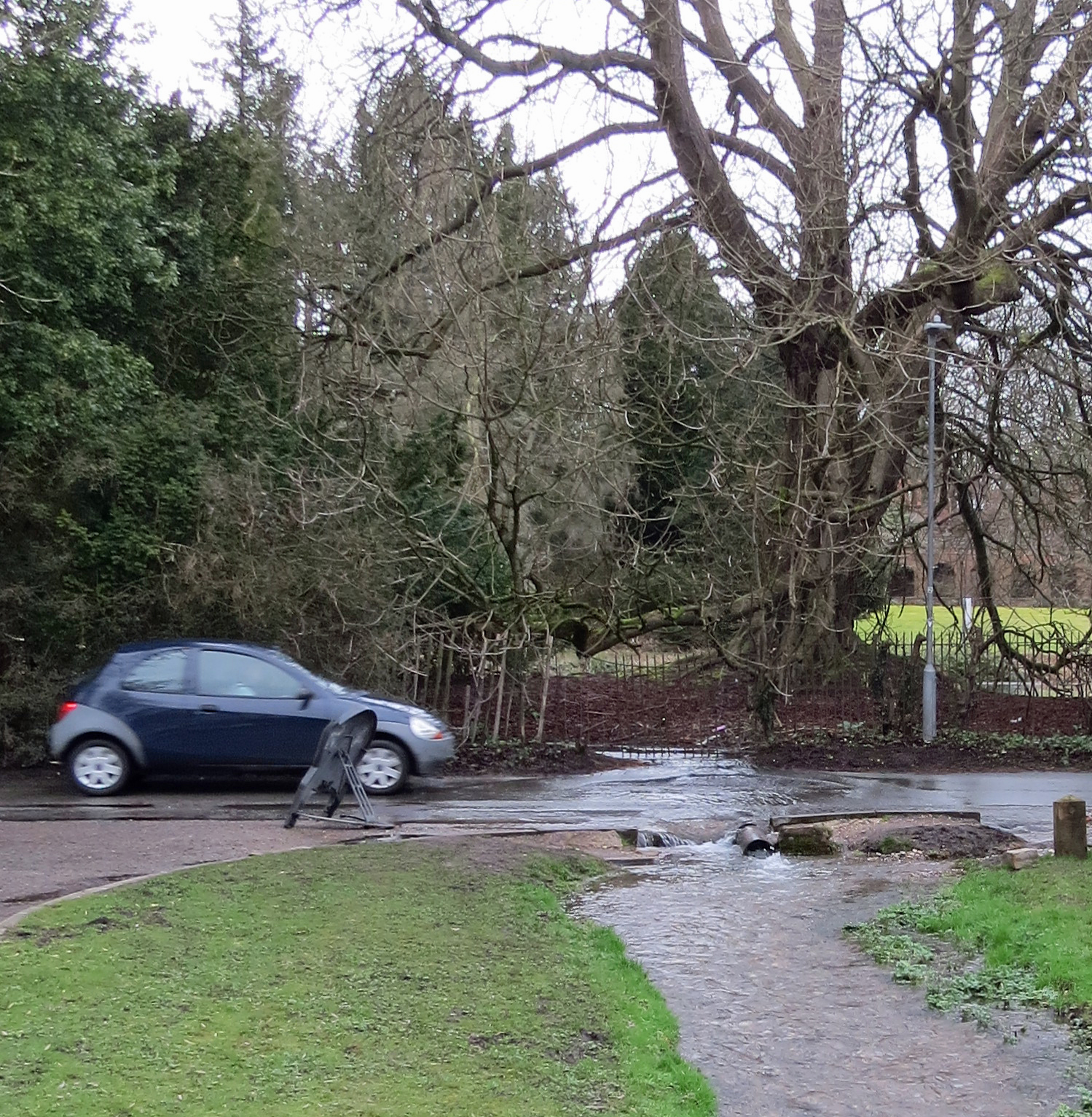
River Chess flooding across Pednor Road by Chesham Tennis Club, Feb 2021

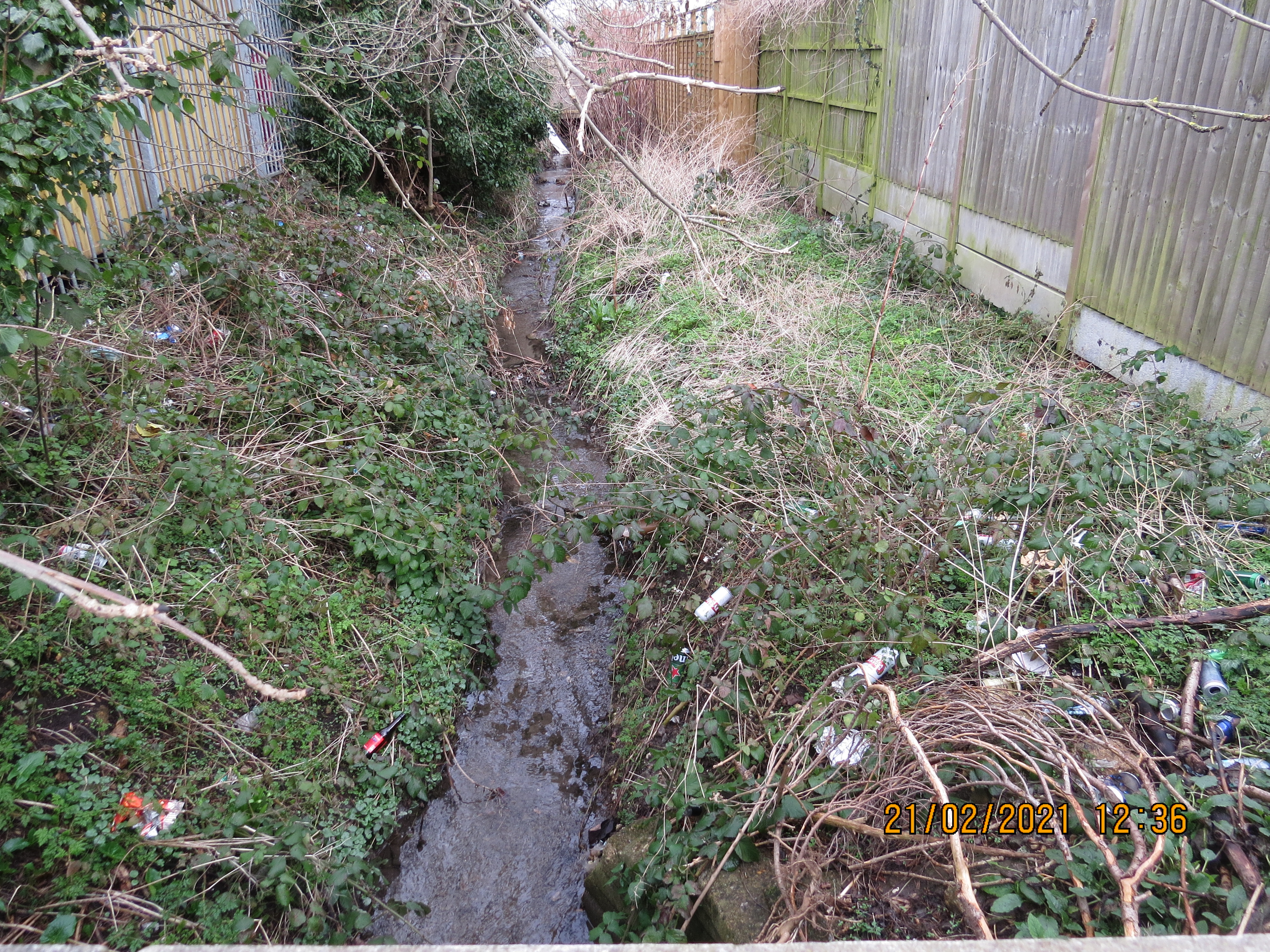
River Chess culvert in Townsend Rd, Chesham, Feb 2021

== Wildlife ==
The Chess Valley is partly within the Chiltern Hills Area of Outstanding Natural Beauty (AONB), with wildlife characteristic of chalk streams and Chiltern Hills. It supports several key species listed in the Government's UK Biodiversity Action Plan. Mammals such as the water vole, birds including the green sandpiper, grey heron, grey wagtail, little egret, osprey, mute swan, European stonechat, water rail and kingfisher, flora such as water crowfoot, purple loosestrife, hemp agrimony, water forget-me not and branched bur-reed. Freshwater fish, found include specifically the brown trout, grayling and bullhead. To support the fish population there is a rich diversity of both invertebrates and of insects, including the mayfly.

== Human influences ==
The valley has a long history of human habitation. There are a number of Roman villa sites along the valley, including Latimer Park. At Sarratt strip lynchets can be seen in terraces along the hillside made by the action of ploughing along the slope and thought to have been the site of medieval vineyards.

Human habitation has altered the valley and the river in many ways, not all of them beneficial for wildlife. River modifications such as dredging and widening slow the current, allow silt to accumulate and smother the gravel riverbed. Changes in the land use adjacent to the river can also have impact. Water meadows have been replaced by arable fields and building developments, altering drainage patterns and causing pollution. Abstraction of water from the underlying chalk aquifer reduces river flows and lowers the river's ability to tolerate drought.

The introduction of alien species to the catchment has had a major effect on the wildlife of the river. Water vole populations declined catastrophically along the Chess between 2001 and 2003 with a 97% population decrease being observed. This population crash was caused mainly by the North American mink, a species introduced to the British Isles originally for the fur trade. In 2004 a water vole recovery project was set up by the Chilterns Chalk Streams Project and the Environment Agency, combining mink control with habitat improvement to try to halt this decline. In 2005 a survey found that the water vole population had recovered to 18% of its 2001 levels.

A less positive story is that of the native white-clawed crayfish, which has suffered at the hands of another American import, the signal crayfish. Originally imported by the aquaculture industry, the signal crayfish was seen as a way for trout farms to diversify and exploit new markets. However, due to their expert, escapologist nature, signal crayfish soon escaped into surrounding river systems and quickly spread throughout the majority of the UK's southern river system. Signal crayfish have carried crayfish plague, to which they are resistant, but the native white-clawed crayfish is not. The result has been the gradual eradication of native crayfish from the UK's rivers. In the case of the Chess, white-clawed crayfish have been extinct since the mid-1990s. The Chess is also home to a number of invasive alien plant species including Japanese knotweed, Himalayan balsam and Orange balsam.

Not all imports have quite such a catastrophic effect. Another escapee into the Chess from fish farms and trout fisheries is the rainbow trout, thought to have been introduced to the Chess in the early 20th century. They have since gone on to establish one of a handful of self-sustaining populations in the UK.

Some of the flow of the Chess results from the outflow of treated sewage from Chesham Sewage Treatment Works, which is material during dry conditions. During heavy rainfall, overflow at the works results in untreated sewage being released to the river. In 2014, a release persisting 5 months occurred, with substantial effects on river quality. Upgrade works to address the increased flow into the works have subsequently been completed.

== Chess cress ==
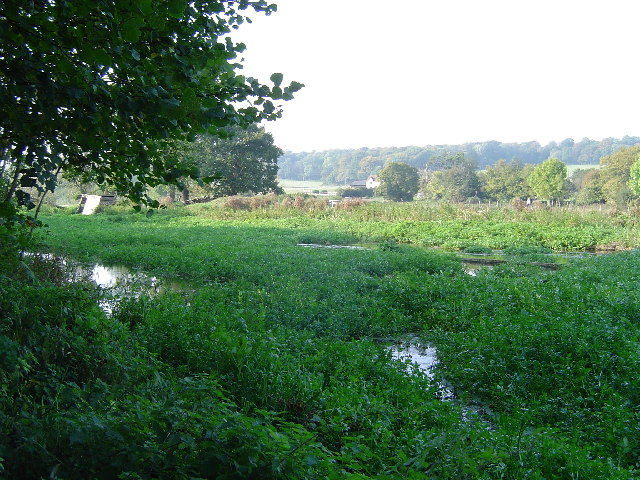
River Chess watercress beds near Sarratt

Historically, the clear chalk stream water of the River Chess, together with the fertile land, was ideal for growing watercress, and this industry which flourished in both Chesham and Rickmansworth in the Victorian era supplied London, being transported on the newly constructed Metropolitan Railway. Today the only working watercress beds are at Moor Lane, Sarratt. In 2014, persistent overflows from Chesham Sewage Treatment Works forced the watercress farm to cease sales, and to continue operation the farm now uses well water.

== Chess Valley Walk ==
The Chess Valley Walk is approximately 10 miles (16 km) long and links with the Metropolitan line stations of Chesham, Chorleywood and Rickmansworth, giving visitors the chance to walk either part or the entire route. The route can be followed in either direction and is clearly way-marked. Most of the route is on public footpaths, but there are short sections on roads.
