= Waterside, Buckinghamshire =

Hamlet in Buckinghamshire, England

Coordinates: 51.697°N 0.603°W

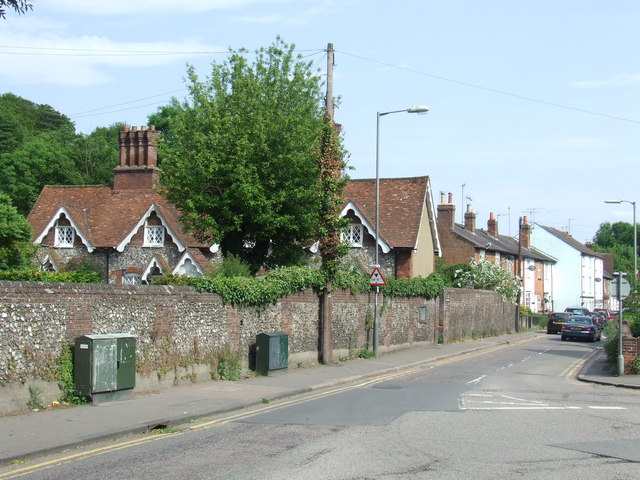
A road in Waterside

Waterside is a hamlet in the parish of Chesham, in Buckinghamshire, England. It is located in the town itself. Historically the name referred to the group of dwellings next to the River Chess in Chesham.

Waterside consists of a mixture of 19th-century houses following the banks of the river Chess. The Metropolitan line link between Baker Street and Chesham runs through this area. Waterside has a fitness centre and a public park known as the Moor. It also comprises several industrial units including a Nestlé bottled water factory situated on the former water cress and trout farm site on Latimer Road.

There is a local community school, Waterside County Combined, which takes children from the age of 3 through to year 6.
