= Pednor =

Hamlet in Buckinghamshire, England

Coordinates: 51.715°N 0.655°W

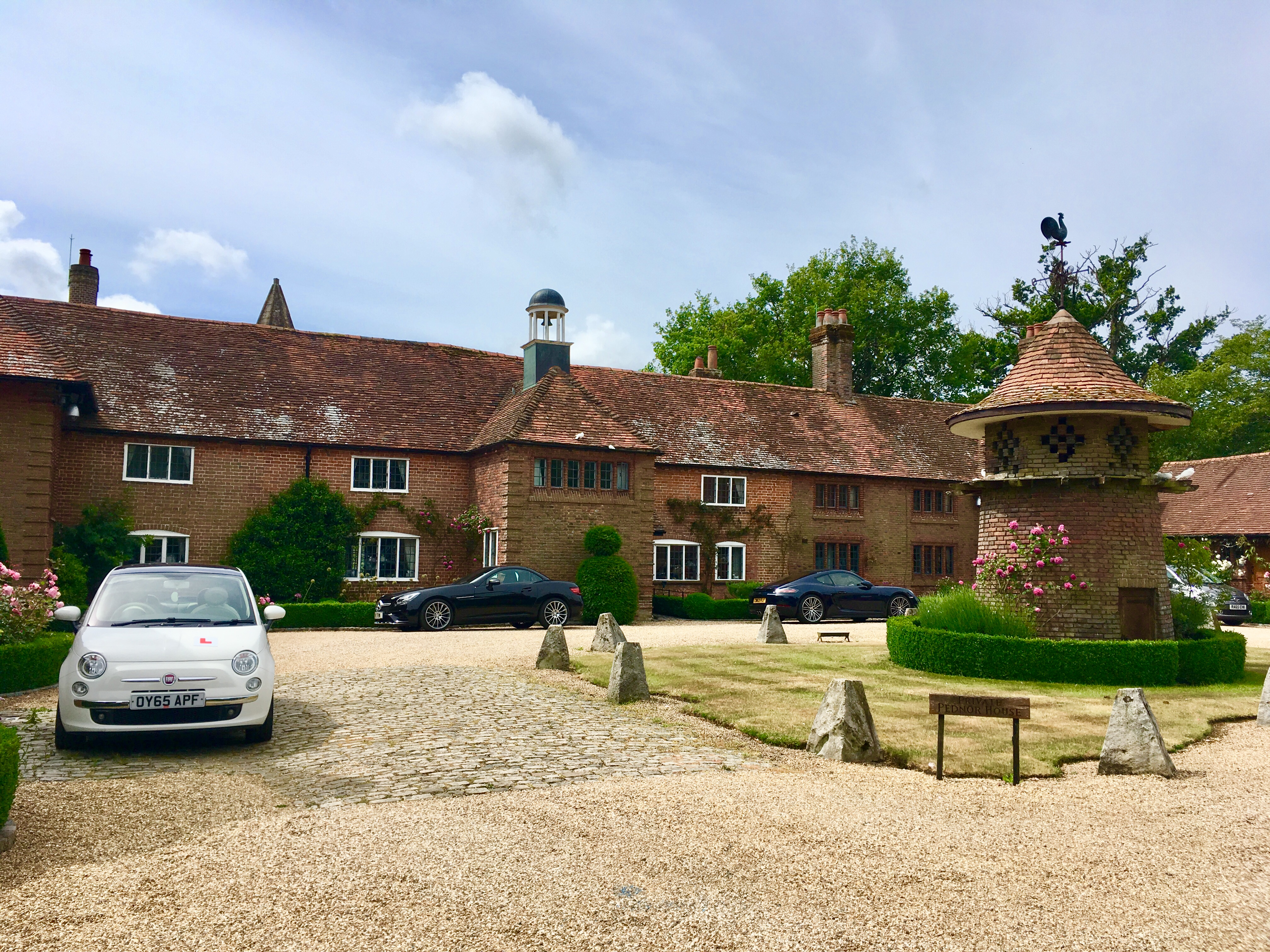
Pednor House, 2020

Pednor is a hamlet in the parish of Chartridge, in Buckinghamshire, England. It is located in the Chiltern Hills two miles (3.2 km) northwest of Chesham and seven miles southeast of Wendover.

The hamlet name is Anglo Saxon in origin, and means 'Peada's slope'. In 1541, following the dissolution of the monasteries the lands at Pednor were surrendered by Missenden Abbey and became part of the estates owned by John Russell, 1st Earl of Bedford. There is a medieval moat sited at Little Pednor Farm which is recorded by English Heritage as associated with the lands transferred from the Abbey and was later succeeded as the predominant residence within the estate by Pednor House.

Pednor Mead is that part of Pednor which is closest to Chesham along the valley known as Pednor Bottom. A number of springs that source the River Chess lie along this bottom. There are farms called Great and Little Pednor which lie beyond the town at this point. The roads connecting them are used for the annual "Tour de Pednor" charity cycle ride and the Pednor 10 running race, two 5-mile loops of the roads organised by local club Chiltern Harriers.

Pednormead End is a neighbourhood within Chesham adjacent to the Old Town at the start of the Pednor Road.
