= Alfred Alexander Burt =

English Victoria Cross recipient (1895–1962)

- Born: 3 March 1895; Hertford, Hertfordshire
- Died: 9 June 1962 (aged 67); Chesham, Buckinghamshire
- Military career
- Allegiance: United Kingdom
- Branch: British Army
- Service years: 1911–1919
- Rank: Sergeant
- Unit: Hertfordshire Regiment
- Conflicts: World War I
- Awards: Victoria Cross

Alfred Alexander Burt VC (3 March 1895 – 9 June 1962) was an English recipient of the Victoria Cross, the highest and most prestigious award for gallantry in the face of the enemy that can be awarded to British and Commonwealth forces.

== Details ==
Burt was employed as a gas fitter for the Broxbourne Gas Company and had enlisted as a territorial soldier in the Hertfordshire Regiment in 1911. On the outbreak of the First World War he was mobilised and arrived on the Western Front in November 1914 with 1/1st battalion of the Hertfordshires. On the date of the action for which he was awarded the Victoria Cross, he was aged 20 years, and serving as a corporal. The 27 September 1915 was the third day of the British offensive known as the Battle of Loos and his battalion was preparing to assault the German lines beside Cuinchy.

The citation for the medal reads:

For most conspicuous bravery at Cuinchy on 27th September, 1915. His company had lined the front trench preparatory to an attack when a large minenwerfer bomb fell into the trench. Corporal Burt, who well knew the destructive power of this class of bomb, might easily have got under cover behind a traverse, but he immediately went forward, put his foot on the fuse, wrenched it out of the bomb and threw it over the parapet, thus rendering the bomb innocuous. His presence of mind and great pluck saved the lives of others in the traverse.

He received his medal from the King in March 1916 and returned to the front to serve for the remainder of the war, being promoted to the rank of Sergeant. On 11 November 1920 he was among the 100 strong honour guard of Victoria Cross holders in the interment of the Unknown Warrior at Westminster Abbey.

He died at the age of 67 in Chesham in 1962, his health having suffered from complications caused by his exposure to a gas attack during the war. There is a road named in his honour in Chesham: Alfred Burt VC Close.

== The medal ==
His Victoria Cross is held at the Hertford Museum as part of the Hertfordshire Regiment collection.

== Bibliography ==
- Batchelor, Peter; Matson, Christopher (2011). The Western Front 1915. VCs of the First World War. The History Press. ISBN 978-0-7524-6057-4.
