= Chartridge =

Village in Buckinghamshire, England

Coordinates: 51.724968°N 0.652788°W

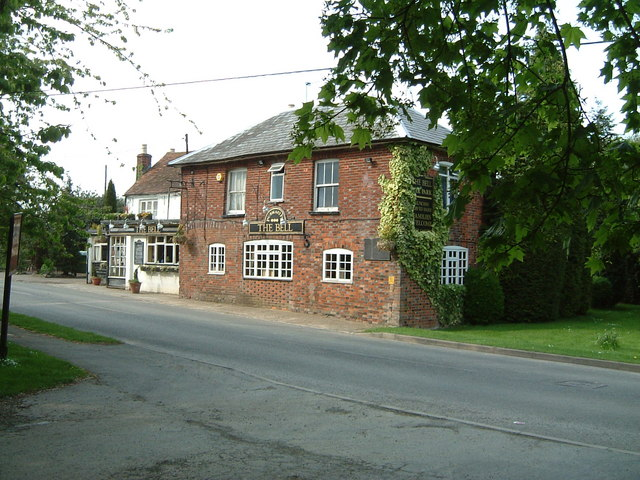
- The Bell is the only pub in the village of Chartridge, 2006

- Location within Buckinghamshire
- Population: 1,624 (2011 Census)
- OS grid reference: SP9303
- Civil parish: Chartridge
- Unitary authority: Buckinghamshire
- Ceremonial county: Buckinghamshire
- Region: South East
- Country: England
- Sovereign state: United Kingdom
- Post town: CHESHAM
- Postcode district: HP5
- Dialling code: 01494
- Police: Thames Valley
- Fire: Buckinghamshire
- Ambulance: South Central
- UK Parliament: Mid Buckinghamshire

Chartridge is a village in Buckinghamshire, England situated two miles north-west of Chesham.

Chartridge is also the name of a civil parish in Chiltern District which also includes the village of Bellingdon and the hamlets of Pednor, Hundridge and Asheridge. It was created in 1899 having previously been part of the parish of Chesham. The village is 34 miles northwest of London and the closest town is Chesham to the south with which it is closely associated. Until 1899 Chartridge was part of Chesham parish and post-Second World War residential housing has resulted in ribbon development stretching out along the Chartridge Road from the town to the village. 11 miles to the northwest is the county town of Buckinghamshire, Aylesbury.

== History ==
The village name is Anglo Saxon in origin, 'Cærdan-hrycg' means Caerda's ridge, referring to the fact that the settlement sits on the top of a hill. There is no specific mention of Chartridge in the Domesday Book. In manorial rolls of 1191 it is recorded as 'Charderuge' presumed linked to the purchase of lands by Robert de Charderugge. By the late 12th century parts of Chartridge were owned by the Sifrewast family. By the 13th century it has become incorporated into the names of local landowners and is referred to in conveyances.

There was no church in Chartridge village as it was historically part of the ecclesiastical parish of Chesham. However, as early as 1311 a private house, Great Hundridge Manor, was recorded as providing a chapel dedicated to King Edward the Martyr. There has been a Baptist Chapel in the village since the 18th century. In 1811 a house was registered for meetings of the Lower Baptist Church in Chesham, now known as the Trinity Baptist Church. Today the Baptist Chapel in the village is a branch of Broadway Baptist Church in Chesham. Services commenced in the early 19th century and in 1844 land close to the Bell pub was given for a chapel which was subsequently replaced by a new chapel in 1885 that was financed by public subscription.

Chartridge Lodge was greatly extended by the Franklin family who lived there from 1899. Today it is home to Chartridge Park, an 18-hole golf course, and a large Conference Centre. The Franklin family were also responsible for the building of several cottages within the village and conversion of a blacksmith's shop into a Reading Room in 1903 to mark the coronation of King Edward VII. Subsequently, it was given by the family to the village and on becoming the village hall was used as a concert room, clubhouse and lending library and has been overseen from that time until the present by the Trustees of Chartridge Reading Room. Due to the absence of a parish church, from its earliest days the Reading Room was also used for religious services and a Sunday School associated with St. Mary's Church, Chesham. Regular services ran from 1964 until 1974 during which it was known as St Christopher's.

During the 19th century the vast majority of employment was provided by agriculture. Directly employing labourers as well as supporting trades such as blacksmiths. Income earned would have been spent in the licensed public houses, the Bell and Portobello Arms, the latter now a private house. In the early part of the 20th century there were four pheasant breeding farms due to the popularity of game shooting and convenience of improved travel by railway from London to Chesham. At least one farm continued in business until the Second World War.

From 1783 there are records of a Pest house in operation. The predominant infection of the time being small pox.

== Education ==
An infant school opened in the 1850s providing education for 30 children. Today it is known as Chartridge Combined School and takes children from ages 5–11. The catchment area secondary schools are:- Chiltern Hills Academy and Chesham Grammar School in Chesham, Dr Challoner's Grammar School for boys in Amersham and – Dr Challoner's High School for girls in Little Chalfont.
