= Asheridge =

Village in Buckinghamshire, England

Coordinates: 51.7304°N 0.6415°W

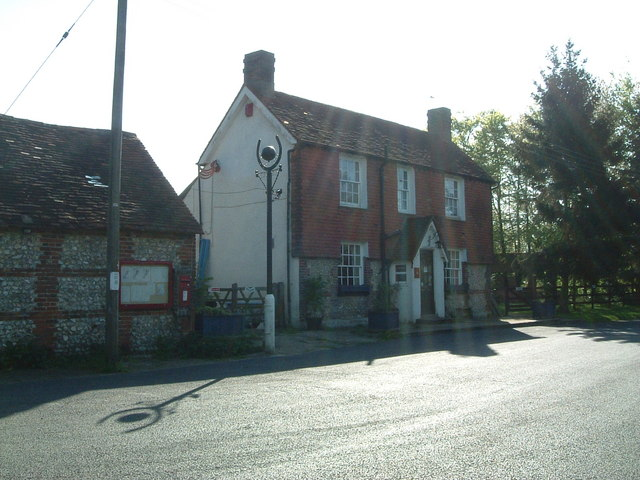
- Blue Ball pub, Asheridge

- Location within Buckinghamshire
- OS grid reference: SP9304
- Unitary authority: Buckinghamshire
- Ceremonial county: Buckinghamshire
- Region: South East
- Country: England
- Sovereign state: United Kingdom
- Post town: Chesham
- Postcode district: HP5
- Police: Thames Valley
- Fire: Buckinghamshire
- Ambulance: South Central
- UK Parliament: Chesham and Amersham

Asheridge (recorded Esserugge in the 13th century) is a small village in the parish of Chartridge, in Buckinghamshire, England. Prior to 1898 it was part of Chesham parish. It is situated in the Chiltern Hills, about two and a half miles north west of Chesham, 5 miles from Great Missenden and 6 miles from Wendover.

The village name is probably of Old English origin but its meaning is uncertain. It may denote, Eastern or Ash tree Ridge, referring to the situation of the village on the ridge of a hill or could derive from previous associations with the manor of nearby Aston Clinton. Matilda de Esserugge is recorded as having connections with Missenden Abbey in the mid-13th century. Another suggestion is that the name derives from the Old English æsc and hrycg, and meant ‘long hill covered with ash trees.’

Asheridge Farmhouse is of 16th-century origin. In 1848 Asheridge is recorded as having a population of 129. A school and congregational church were established there during the latter part of the 19th century and records show they were still in existence in 1891. The Blue Ball public house which was at the centre of the settlement at that time is still in business today.

On 5 March 1945 an Avro Lancaster PB745 crashed in fields near Asheridge. The seven crew of the aircraft were drawn from the Royal Air Force and the Royal Australian Air Force. There was only one survivor, the rear gunner, William Hart. A memorial service and dedication of a plaque took place on 13 May 2012.

Aneurin (Nye) Bevan, Labour Minister responsible for the establishment of the National Health Service and his wife Jennie Lee, also a Minister in the same Labour Government and a key figure in the creation of the Open University, came to live at Asheridge Farm in 1954. After the death of her husband in 1960, Lee continued to live there until moving to London in 1968. She became Baroness Lee of Asheridge in 1970.
