= Sarratt Bottom nature reserve =

Meadow in Hertfordshire, England

Coordinates: 51.6794°N 0.51022°W

Sarratt Bottom
- Site of Special Scientific Interest
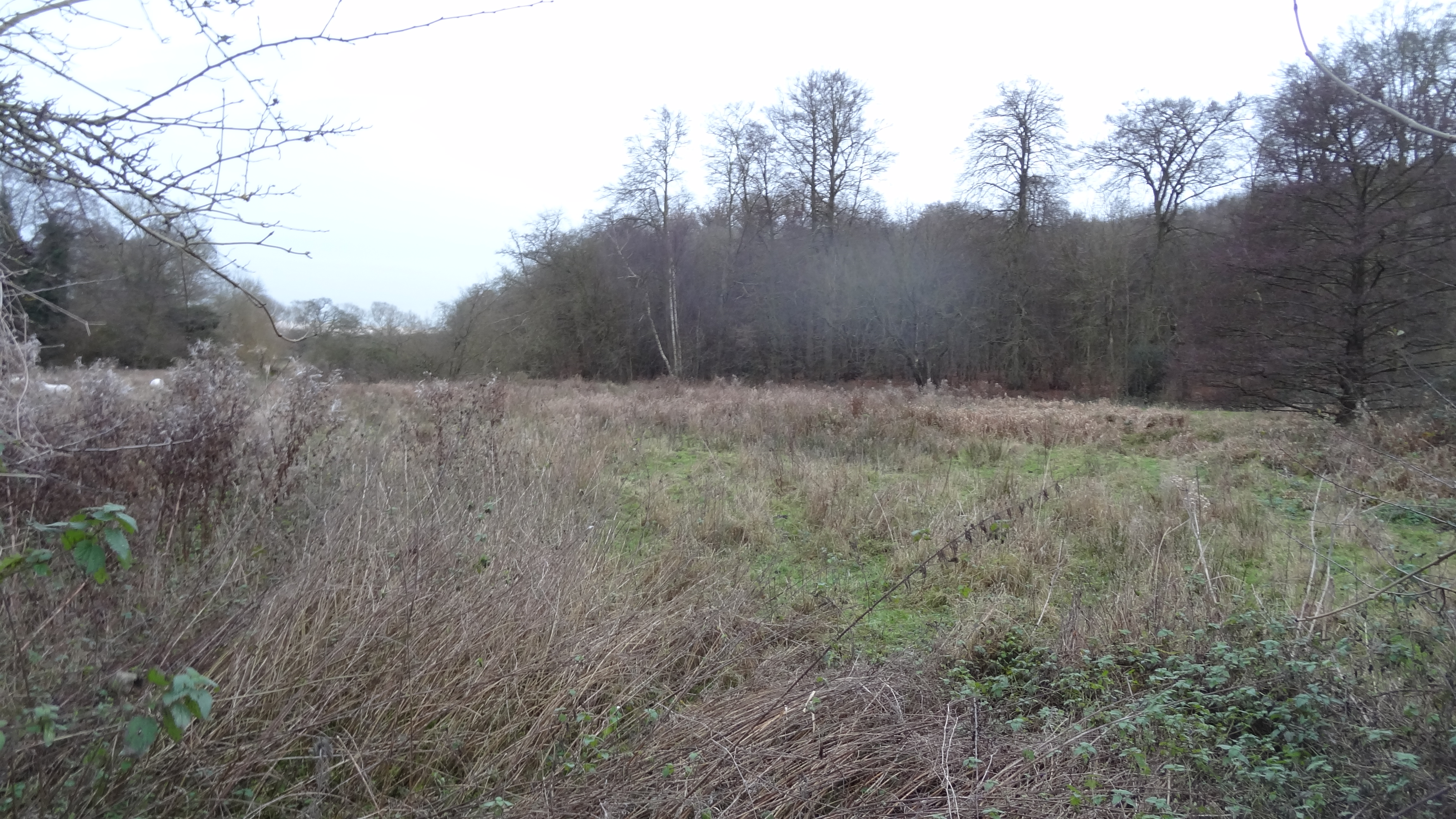
- Location of Sarratt Bottom.
- Area of search: Hertfordshire
- Grid reference: TQ031989
- Interest: Biological
- Area: 3.2 ha (7.9 acres)
- Notification date: 1984
- Location map: Magic Map

Sarratt Bottom nature reserve in Hertfordshire is a 3.2-hectare (7.9-acre) biological Site of Special Scientific Interest. The site is a meadow beside the River Chess. It is an example of damp grassland which has been traditionally managed for grazing. There are also areas of swamp and marsh. The main plants in grassland areas include sweet vernal grass and meadow foxtail, and marsh horsetail and common spike-rush are common in damper areas. The site has hedgehogs and a wide variety of wetland birds and invertebrates.

There is no public access but the site can be viewed from Moor Lane. The local planning authority is Three Rivers District Council.

== Archaeology ==
A dig in August 2025 had a twofold aim: trying to find whether a Roman road ran across the site, and the dating of the lynchets, narrow terraces cut into the hill to aid farming. No road was found but finds indicated there might have been a villa near by. The lynchets were dated to the medieval period.

== See also ==
- List of Sites of Special Scientific Interest in Hertfordshire
