= Chesham =

Town in Buckinghamshire, England

Coordinates: 51.712°N 0.612°W

- Town
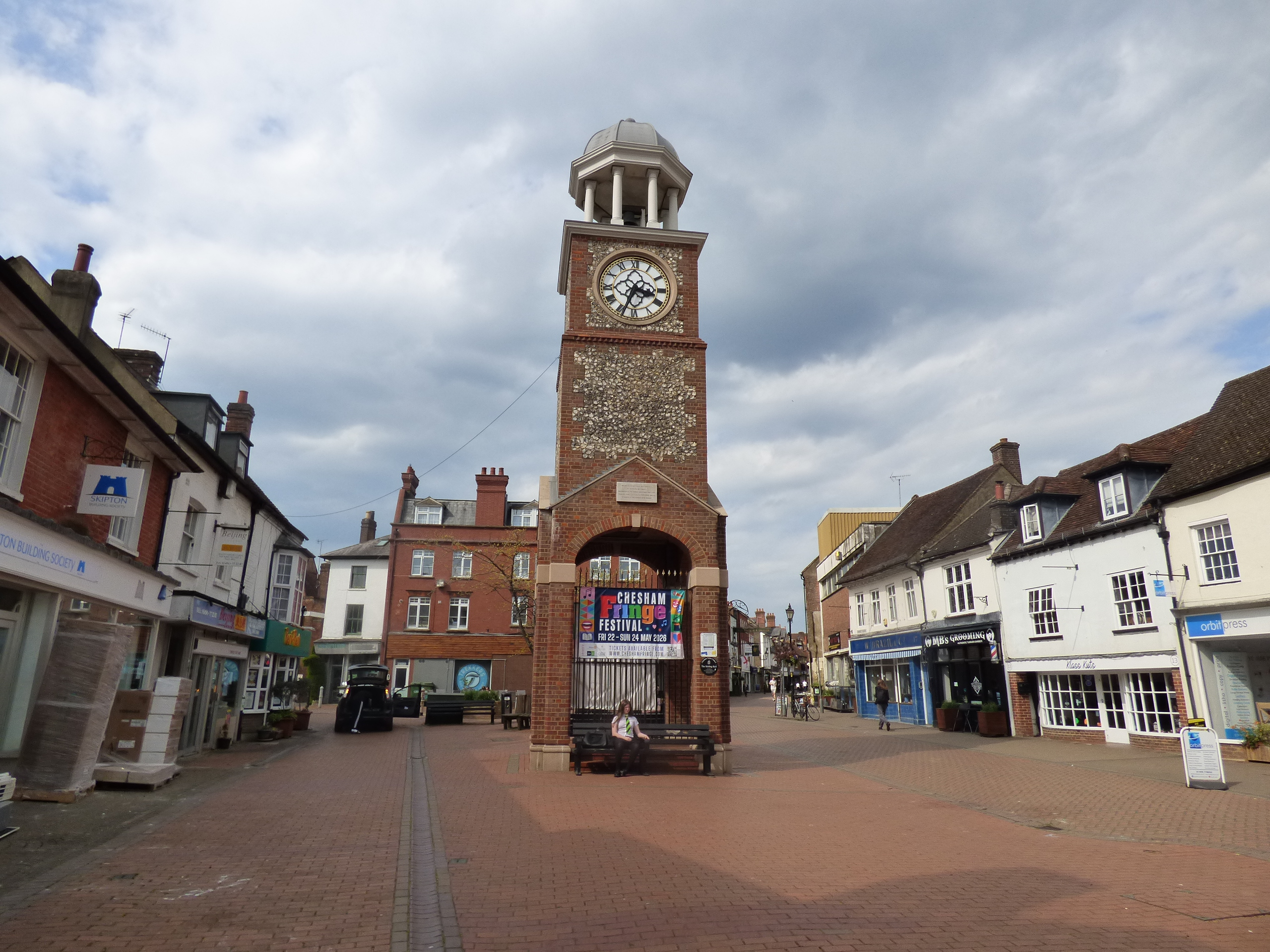
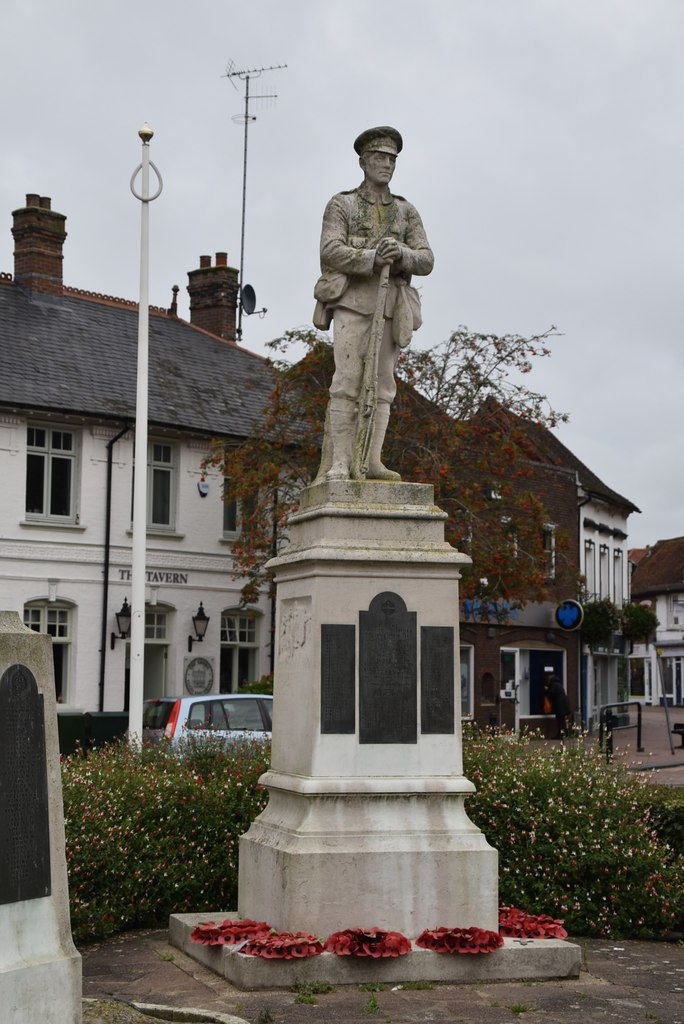
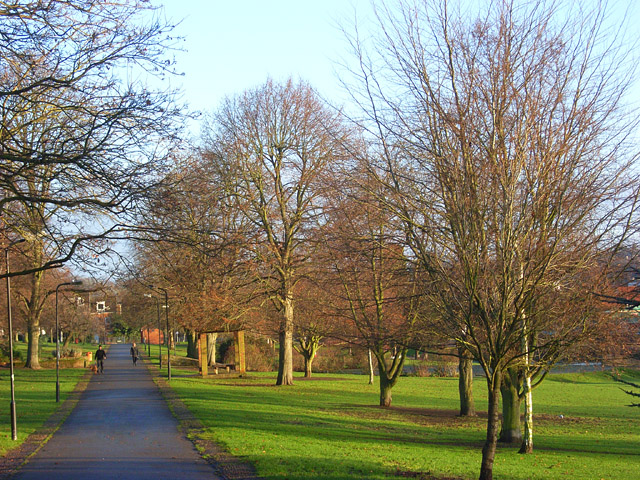
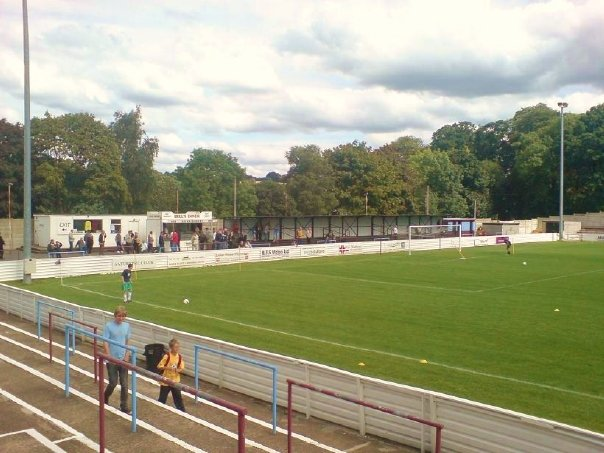
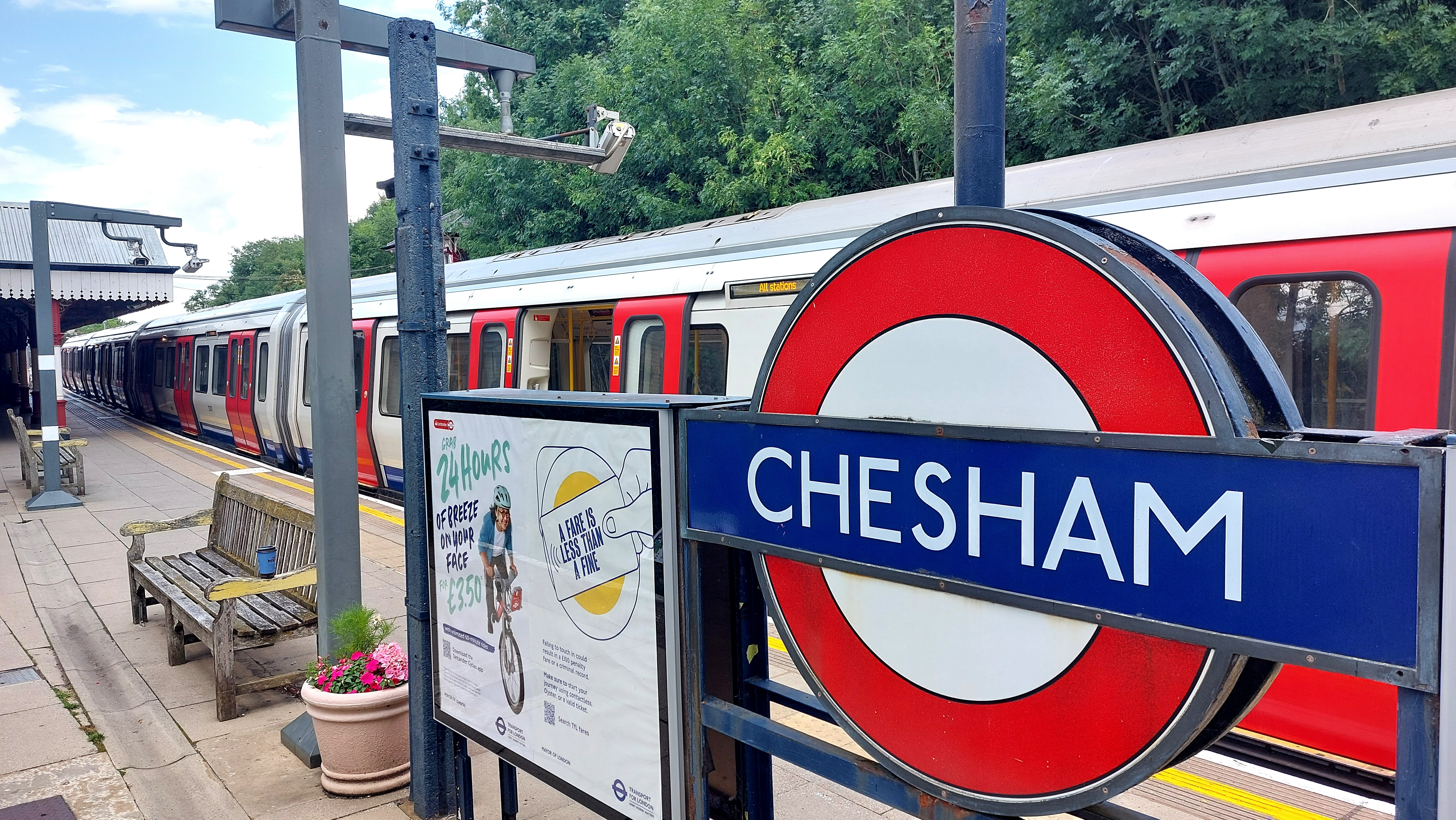
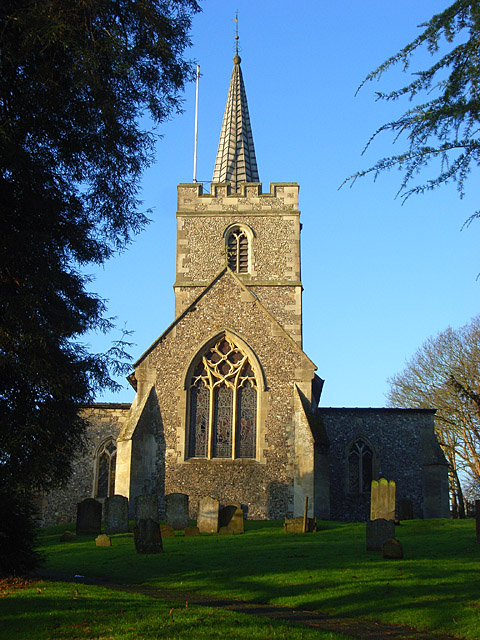
- Clock Tower in Market Square War Memorial Lowndes Park The Meadow Chesham tube station St Mary's Church

- Flag

- Location within Buckinghamshire
- Population: 23,088 (2021)
- OS grid reference: SP965015
  - London: 25.8 miles (41.5 km) SE
- Civil parish: Chesham
- Unitary authority: Buckinghamshire
- Ceremonial county: Buckinghamshire
- Region: South East
- Country: England
- Sovereign state: United Kingdom
- Post town: CHESHAM
- Postcode district: HP5
- Dialling code: 01494
- Police: Thames Valley
- Fire: Buckinghamshire
- Ambulance: South Central
- UK Parliament: Chesham and Amersham

Chesham (/ˈtʃɛʃəm/ CHESH-əm, locally /ˈtʃɛsəm/ CHESS-əm or /ˈtʃɛzəm/ CHEZ-əm) is a market town and civil parish in Buckinghamshire, England, United Kingdom, 11 miles (18 km) south-east of the county town of Aylesbury, about 26 miles (42 km) north-west of central London, and part of the London commuter belt. It is in the Chess Valley, surrounded by farmland. The earliest records of Chesham as a settlement are from the second half of the 10th century, although there is archaeological evidence of people in this area from around 8000 BC. Henry III granted a royal charter for a weekly market in 1257.

Chesham is known for its four Bs — boots, beer, brushes and Baptists. In the face of fierce competition from both home and abroad during the later 19th and early 20th centuries, the three traditional industries rapidly declined. The ready availability of skilled labour encouraged new industries to the town both before and after the Second World War. Today, employment in the town is provided mainly by small businesses engaged in light industry, technology and professional services.

From the early part of the 20th century, Chesham has experienced considerable expansion, with new housing developments and civic infrastructure. Chesham has become a commuter town with improved connection to London via the London Underground and road networks. The town centre has been progressively redeveloped since the 1960s and has been pedestrianised since the 1990s. The population at the 2021 census was 23,008.

== History ==
There is archaeological evidence of the earliest settlement during the Late Mesolithic period around 5000 BC in East Street, Chesham where a large quantity of flint tools were found. The earliest farming evidence from the Neolithic era around 2500 BC. Bronze Age tribes settled in the valley around 1800 BC and they were succeeded by Iron Age Belgic people of the Catuvellauni tribe around 500 BC. Between 150 and 400 AD, there is evidence of Romano-British farming, and nearby at Latimer, there is archaeological evidence of a Roman villa and the planting of grapevines. However, the area was then deserted until the Saxon period around the 7th century.

Contrary to popular belief, the town is not named after the river; rather, the river is named after the town. The first recorded reference to Chesham is under the Old English name Cæstæleshamm, meaning "the river-meadow at the pile of stones" around 970 in the will of Lady Ælfgifu, who has been identified as the former wife of King Eadwig. She held an estate here which she bequeathed to Abingdon Abbey.

Prior to 1066 there were three adjacent estates which comprised Caestreham which are briefly recorded in the Domesday Book as being of 1 1/2, 4 and 8 1/2 hides, having four mills. The most important of these manors was held by Queen Edith, the widow of Edward the Confessor. Other land having been returned to the Crown it was in the hands of Harold Godwinson and his brother Leofwine Godwinson. Part of these later became Chesham Bois parish. After 1066 Edith kept her lands and William the Conqueror divided royal lands between his half-brother Odo, Bishop of Bayeux and Hugh de Bolbec.

=== The land owners of Chesham ===
The Domesday Book records that there were three manors in Cestreham and one at nearby Latimer. William the Conqueror shared out the estates between four of his dependants. The vast majority of land was granted to Hugh de Bolebec and smaller parcels to Odo, Bishop of Bayeux, Toustain Mantel and Alsi.

Before the 13th century, the three Cestreham manors were known as Chesham Higham, Chesham Bury and Chesham Bois. In the 14th century they were first recorded as 'the manors of Great Chesham'. Collectively they extended beyond the current Chesham town boundary. Together with the manor at Latimer they were held by the Earls of Oxford and Surrey. During the 16th century Greater Chesham was owned by the Seymour family who disposed of it to the Cavendish family who were the Earls and later Dukes of Devonshire. It is from the 15th century that the earliest surviving properties survive and are to be found close by the church in an area called the Nap, and along part of the present-day Church Street. Though gradually disposing of land, the Cavendishes maintained an influence in the town until the 19th century. The Lowndes family started purchasing land from the 16th century. William Lowndes was an influential politician and Secretary to the Treasury during the reigns of Mary II, William III, and Queen Anne. He rebuilt the original Bury and manor house of Great Chesham in 1712. The Lowndes family settled in Chesham and over the next 200 years became equally influential both nationally through politics and the law and locally within the town as its principal benefactors.

=== Ecclesiastical history ===
No evidence remains of any church prior to the Norman Conquest. However, the siting of puddingstones beneath the present-day church suggests a wooden church was constructed on the site during the Anglo-Saxon period. During the 12th century two families of Norman descent, the de Bolebecs and the Sifrewasts, each held a share of the advowson assigned to the adjacent manors of Chesham Higham and Chesham Bury respectively for the Church at Chesham which it is evidenced from about 1154 was dedicated to St Mary. These moieties were subsequently given by the families to two monasteries. In 1194 the de Bolbecs bestowed their advowson to the abbot and monks of Woburn Abbey and henceforth the parish of Chesham Higham was renamed 'Chesham Woburn'. Meanwhile, and sometime before 1199, the Sifrewast family granted their advowson to the convent of St Mary's de Pré Leicester. As a consequence the advowson for the parish of Chesham Bury became known as 'Chesham Leicester'. In 1536 Henry VIII seized control of church property as part of the dissolution of the monasteries. Subsequently, during Edward VI and Elizabeth I's reigns, first Chesham Woburn and then Chesham Leicester advowsons became part of the estates of the Dukes of Bedford. Though there were originally two vicars appointed to the parish church of St Mary's, from the 17th century a single incumbent was appointed. Jurisdiction was still shared between both advowsons and two parsonages, an 'upper' and 'lower', continued to be maintained until the 18th century when both were superseded by a single new parsonage. The Duke of Bedford subsequently consolidated the moieties by Act of Parliament in 1767. To accommodate the increasing population during the 19th century, a new parish church was built in 1867; Christ Church at Waterside, and further churches were built at Ashley Green and Bellingdon, which were at the time both within the civil parish of Chesham.

Thomas Harding memorial

=== Religious dissent and nonconformity ===
Chesham is noted for the religious dissent which dominated the town from the 15th century. In 1532 Thomas Harding was burnt at the stake in the town for being a Lollard and heretic. From the 17th century, Chesham was a focus for those dissenting from mainstream religion. Quakers met in the late 17th century in Chesham and in 1798 they built the current meeting house. The first Baptists' meeting dates back to about 1640 and a place was registered for services in 1706. The first chapel was opened in 1712, one of many to be built for the various Baptist groups during the 18th and 19th centuries. John Wesley preached in Chesham in the 1760s and a Wesleyan Methodist society existed in the town. In more recent time a Wesleyan Methodist chapel was opened in 1897. The Christian Brethren which date back in Chesham to 1876, opened their Gospel Hall in 1895, which closed in December 2008. Broadway Baptist church had congregations at the Vale, Hawridge, Ashley Green and Chartridge; only the one at Chartridge survives. Trinity Baptist church had congregations at Hyde Heath, Ley Hill and Whelpley Hill; only the one at Hyde Heath survives. The Congregational Church had congregations at Asheridge and Pond Park.

=== Emigration to the American colonies ===
In 1630 Aquila Chase left Chesham to join the colony, settling first at Hampton (now New Hampshire), then Newbury, Massachusetts. Descendants of Aquila became influential in shaping political, legislative and commercial matters from the colonial period until after the Declaration of Independence. For example, Salmon P. Chase was the United States Treasury Secretary and Chief Justice in the 1870s. The Chase Manhattan Bank is named after him (although Chase did not have any connection with the bank).

=== Industrial development ===
The primary industries of the town in medieval times were flour production, woodworking and weaving of wool. There were four mills built along the Chess which was diverted to generate sufficient power. Surplus flour was supplied to London. The number of clothworkers, including spinners and those associated with dying (fullers), grew rapidly between 1530 and 1730 and became the major industry in the town prior to a period of rapid decline. Between 1740 and 1798, mills were converted to produce paper (pulp), responding to London's insatiable demand for paper. However, technological developments in paper-making elsewhere rendered the mills unprofitable and they reverted to flour production in the 1850s.

Painting of Chesham town, circa 1750

New industries emerged from the 16th century onwards. The woodlands had been a source of firewood for London during the mediaeval period. A small-scale woodenware industry making shovels, brooms, spoons and chairs, began around 1538 and its expansion was accompanied by the planting of beechwoods between the 17th and 19th centuries. Straw plaiting was seen as home-based work for the wives and daughters of labourers from the 18th century. Straw was also imported from Italy to produce the superior 'Tuscan plait' traded at a Saturday market for the Luton and Dunstable hat trade and remained the major cottage industry until around 1860, providing employment for women and girls, some of whom attended a 'plait-school' in Waterside. Lace making developed in the 16th century as a cottage industry and was valued for its quality. Chesham specialised in black lace. The industry declined in the 1850s due to mechanisation in Nottingham. Between 1838 and 1864 silk-spinning, powered by a steam-driven mill in Waterside, was started to make use of unemployed lace workers. This trend was relatively short-lived as changes in fashion and the growth of the railways resulted in competition from elsewhere for the valuable London markets. However one exception was the firm of George Tutill which specialised in high-quality banners and was responsible for three-quarters of those made for trade unions.

Brush making was introduced around 1829 to make use of the off-cuts from woodworking. Boot and shoe making which started as a cottage industry later expanding through small workshops, thrived following the opening of tanneries around 1792 which also supplied leather for saddle making and gloves. By the mid-19th century both brush-making and footwear manufacture became major industries in the town with production concentrated in large factories. The industry declined in the early-20th century. Beer brewing grew rapidly around the town centre in the 19th century, again declining in the 20th century. These traditional industries were succeeded by smaller but more commercial enterprises using skilled labour. For example, in 1908 the Chiltern Toy Works was opened by Joseph Eisenmann on Bellingdon Road, later moving to the 'new' industrial estate in Waterside, making high-quality teddy bears, before closing in 1960. Post-war industry includes glue manufacture (Industrial Adhesives), aluminium-based packaging (Alcan), castings (Draycast Foundries Limited), balloons (B-Loony) and household cleaning products (Kilrock).

=== The town in times of war ===
Henry VIII imposed a tax on the town to pay for his wars against Scotland and France.

In common with the majority of communities in Buckinghamshire, Chesham's Lollard heritage and puritan traditions ensured it would vehemently resist King Charles I's demand for Ship Money; a tax on tradesmen and landowners. In 1635 the townsfolk of Chesham protested to the Sheriff of Buckinghamshire, Sir Peter Temple, who was reluctantly enforcing a writ requiring payment of a levy to the King. Not surprisingly given the local allegiances to John Hampden, the towns' people largely sided with the Parliamentarians at the outbreak of the English Civil War. During 1642 the influential Parliamentarians John Pym and Earl of Warwick were headquartered in the town along with large numbers of troops. There are records of skirmishes in the area during 1643 when Prince Rupert was stationed near Aylesbury and dispatched Robert Dormer, 1st Earl of Carnarvon to pillage nearby towns, such as Wendover. Heading toward Chesham a company of the Parliamentary Army from the town met them outside Great Missenden where a skirmish drove the Parliamentary force back.

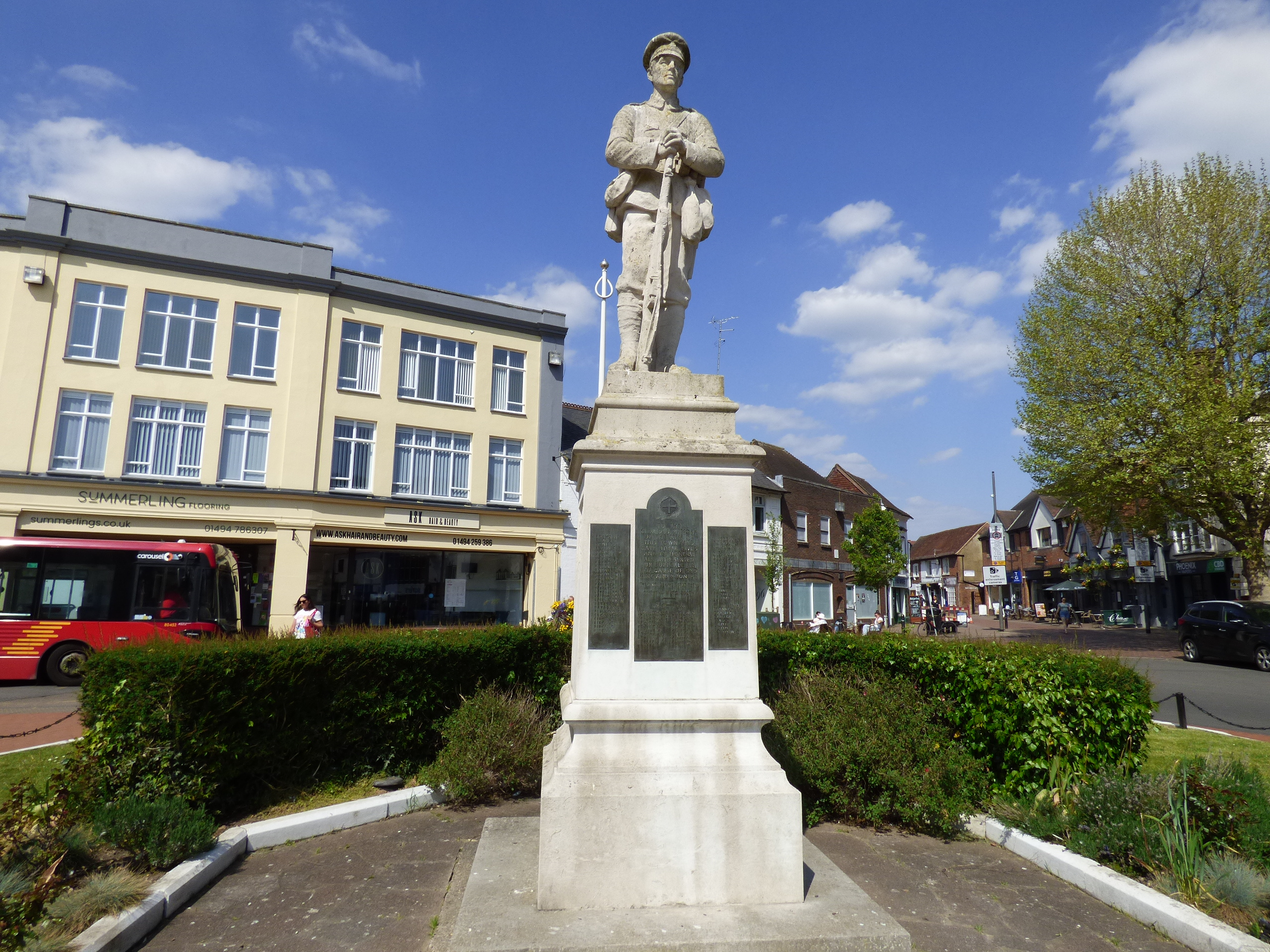
Chesham War Memorial

The records of the Posse Comitatus for Chesham in 1798 recorded over 800 men between the ages of 16 and 60 enrolled in a militia to defend the town in the event of invasion by Napoleon I or to deal with civil unrest. Less than 50 years later, in 1846, a similar register of 22 able-bodied men had been assembled to form the Chesham troop of the Royal Buckinghamshire Yeomanry which coincided with the billeting of troops from the 7th Queen's Own Hussars passing through the town on their way to Ireland.

During the First World War, 188 servicemen from Chesham lost their lives (see Landmarks). Alfred Burt, a corporal in the Bedfordshire and Hertfordshire Regiment from Chesham, received the Victoria Cross for his actions in September 1915. The town provided temporary quarters for several regiments including the Kings Royal Rifles and the Royal Engineers honed their bridge building skills in local parks. In 1919, two 'Victory Oaks' were planted in the town.

Over the duration of the Second World War, 80 servicemen lost their lives. Air raid shelters were built by the Council in 1940, although the official view was that the town was unlikely to be targeted since it was not a strategic location. An estimated 45 bombs fell in the Chesham area, killing at least nine people.

=== Social history ===
A Chesham workhouse for 90 paupers was operating in Germain Street as early as 1777. New legislation transferred the control of the Chesham institution to Amersham Poor Law Union in 1835. However, there were long-standing rivalries between the locals of both towns and in July that year violence broke out when an order was given to remove the paupers to Amersham. The Riot Act was read out to an angry crowd of 500 and arrests followed.

Publicly funded education started with the opening of a British School in 1825 followed by a National School in 1845, an Infants' School in 1851 and the first Elementary School for girls in 1864. Chesham Building Society opened for business in 1845 and continued to operate until June 2010, when it was taken over by the Skipton Building Society. Other public institutions also started at this time, with a Fire Brigade being established in 1846, the first cemetery in 1858 and a police station built in 1861.

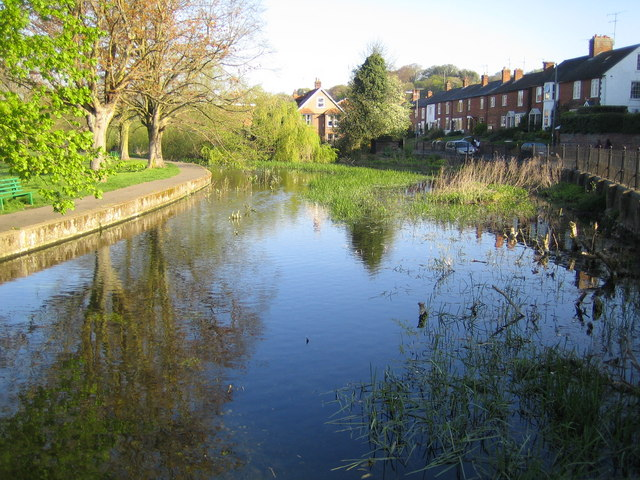
Waterside and River Chess

Chesham cottage hospital, built for £865 17s 11d on land provided by Lord Chesham, opened in October 1869, just ahead of an outbreak of typhoid in 1871. Despite a local campaign to save the hospital it closed in 2005. In September 2010 the derelict hospital building was severely damaged by a fire caused by arsonists, according to police reports. The Council commissioned a waterworks to be built in 1875 in Alma Road and mains drainage in the town and a sewage works was opened adjacent to the Chess, downstream in 1887. A gasworks was constructed on the southern part of the town in 1847. Bathing in the Chess at Waterside was an old tradition which became increasingly popular in the 19th century. An open-air pool was built by the council in 1912.

Transport connections have always come late to the town. The Metropolitan Railway eventually reached Chesham in July 1889. Electrification was not to come until the 1960s. The first half of the 20th century saw much expansion in the town.

The first public viewings of cinema films in Chesham were provided by travelling showmen around 1900 and attracted large crowds. The first purpose-built cinema, The Empire Picture Hall, opened in Station Road in 1912 and, in 1914, The Chesham Palace opened in The Broadway. Both showed silent films. By 1920 The Empire had closed. In 1930, The Chesham Palace was refurbished to show the new 'talkies' and reopened as The Astoria, until closing in 1959. The Embassy in Germain Street opened in 1935 and survived until 1982. The Elgiva Theatre, opened in 1976 beside St Mary's Way, was equipped to show films. It moved to a new site nearby in 1998.

== Geography ==
The town is in the Chess Valley 13 miles south-east of the county town Aylesbury and is 25 miles (40 km) north west of central London. It is the fourth largest town in the ceremonial county of Buckinghamshire and the largest in Chiltern District, with a population of some 20,343 people behind Milton Keynes with 184,500, High Wycombe with 118,200 and Aylesbury with 69,200. Nearby Amersham has 17,719.

=== Topography and geology ===
Chesham is in the Chiltern Hills and from its lowest point of 295 feet (90 metres) above sea level rises up valley sides. It lies at the confluence of four dry valleys formed by the meltwater at the end of the last ice age which deposited onto the bed rock of chalk, alluvial gravels, silts, on which the town now sits. Subsequent periods of subsidence and submergence deposited clays and flints. The River Chess is a chalk-stream which rises from three springs; to the north-west along the Pednor Vale at Frogmoor, at Higham Mead to the north of the town, and to the west near the Amersham Road which converge in the town near to East Street. The river was known as the Isen from at least the 12th century when it is found contributing to the name of the nearby hamlet of Isenhampstead, later to divide and become the manors of Isenhampstead Chenies and Isenhampstead Latimer and persisting until the 19th century. It has been suggested, but not established, that the old name 'Isen', which derives from the Anglo-Saxon word for iron, refers to the chalybeate or iron-charged spring waters which feed the river Today the streams are culverted and conducted below street level before emerging at Waterside and flowing in a south easterly direction towards Latimer. From there it flows to the north of Chenies and on towards Rickmansworth after which it joins the River Colne.

=== Built environment and social geography ===
Chesham developed as a market town which prospered through its manufacturing industries fuelled by a series of mills which sprung up along the River Chess. Until the 19th century the town was centred to the south-eastern end of the present High Street. Most of the present-day town centre's development took place during Victorian times. The 'old town', particularly Church and Germain Street, has been well preserved and now designated a conservation area. It includes a number of impressive residential, institutional and commercial buildings that largely survived Victorian 'improvement'. The 12th century St Mary's Church, which underwent refurbishment and redesign by George Gilbert Scott in the 19th century. 'The Bury', a Queen Anne town house was built in 1712 for William Lowndes Secretary to the Treasury. Chesham had two workhouses, both buildings survived and are located in Germain Street. Industrial buildings on the north side of the town have been redeveloped into offices in recent years.

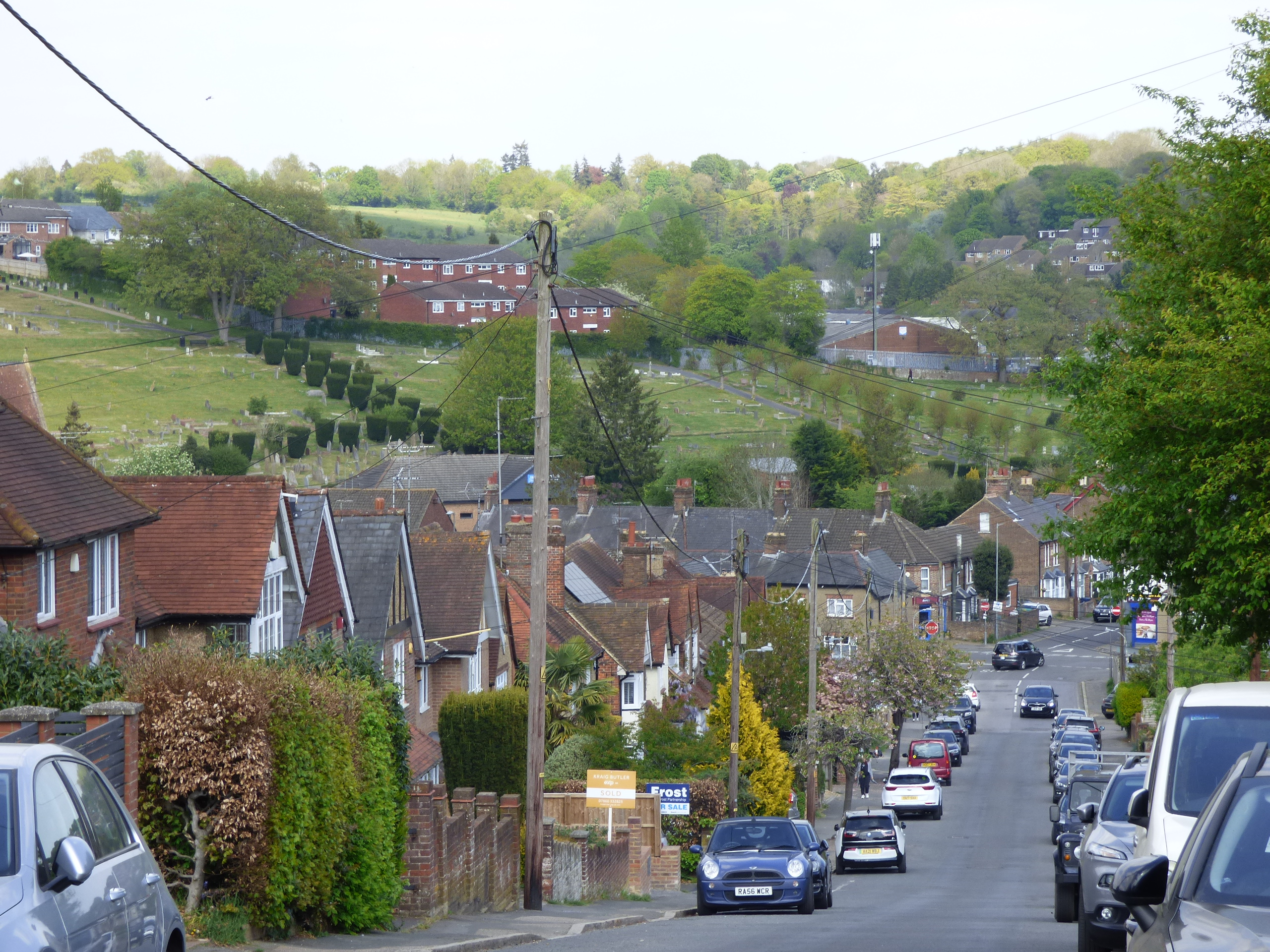
View from the top of Lowndes Avenue in Chesham

The town had a population of 2,425 by 1841. This had increased to more to 9,000 by the end of the 19th century. As a consequence the centre of the town shifted to the east as shops, workshops and cottages sprung up along the High Street and Berkhampstead Road. In the period after the Second World War the town centre was progressively redeveloped. In the 1960s St Mary's Way was constructed, rerouting the A416 around the congested High Street which avoided the need to widen the street, conserved its character and allowed for its pedestrianisation during the 1990s. Industrial development centred at the southern end of the town at Waterside and at the northern end along the Asheridge Vale.

Compared to other towns in south Buckinghamshire, there are fewer detached and owner-occupied houses and a higher proportion of social rental accommodation. Expansion has been mainly to the east of the old town where artisan's housing sprung up along Berkhamsted Road and the many steep valley sides. This was spurred on by the extension of the railway to the town in the 1880s, subsequently the promotion of Metroland during the 1920s and electrification of the Metropolitan line in the 1960s. Pond Park estate was built in the 1930s. The population grew fast after the Second World War as workers followed employers out from London. The population in 1951 was 11,500 leading to the building of the Chessmount and Hilltop estates by developers in the 1950s and 1960s. By 1971 the population reached 20,000, since when it has only increased slightly.

The growing popularity of the Chilterns as a place to live from the mid-20th century led to restrictions on housing and industrial development in the Chilterns Area of Outstanding Natural Beauty and has sustained the demand for further housebuilding in the town. Today an increasing number of those in employment find work outside the town.

=== Climate ===
Chesham experiences an oceanic climate (Köppen climate classification Cfb) similar to almost all of the United Kingdom, although the lower parts of the valley have significant frost hollow characteristics – being several degrees colder than surrounding areas on clear, calm nights and so have much lower average minimum temperatures than shown in the table. The lowest recorded temperature in Chesham was −19.6 °C (−3 °F) on 20 December 2010 at a private weather station, which was also the coldest place in the UK on that date. On 12 February 2012, the coldest day in Britain since December 2010, temperatures in Chesham fell to −18.3 °C (−1 °F) again the lowest in the country on that date.

Climate data for Chesham
Month	Jan	Feb	Mar	Apr	May	Jun	Jul	Aug	Sep	Oct	Nov	Dec	Year
Mean daily maximum °C (°F)	8 (46)	9 (48)	12 (54)	14 (57)	18 (64)	21 (70)	23 (73)	23 (73)	20 (68)	16 (61)	11 (52)	8 (46)	15 (59)
Mean daily minimum °C (°F)	2 (36)	3 (37)	4 (39)	5 (41)	8 (46)	11 (52)	13 (55)	13 (55)	10 (50)	7 (45)	4 (39)	3 (37)	7 (44)
Average precipitation mm (inches)	50.8 (2.00)	44.4 (1.75)	42.9 (1.69)	51.1 (2.01)	51.7 (2.04)	46.1 (1.81)	43.9 (1.73)	74.9 (2.95)	50.1 (1.97)	66.8 (2.63)	61.8 (2.43)	57.5 (2.26)	642 (25.27)
Source: World Weather Online

=== Neighbourhoods and wards ===
The town comprises the following communities:

- Asheridge Vale, stretches along Asheridge Road on the north-west edge of the town. The large housing development was built during the mid 20th century along with an industrial estate comprising manufacturing and light industrial units which has since undergone diversification into offices and small businesses. Also a town council ward.
- Botley, a hamlet located to the east of the town of Chesham between Lye Green and Ley Hill (the latter in Latimer parish). Part of Townsend ward.
- Chesham Vale, area on the northern edge of the town on the road to the villages of Hawridge and Cholesbury. Also a town council ward called Vale.
- Chessmount, area to the east of the town centre. Part of Waterside ward.
- Codmore, ancient hamlet located to the north-east of the town centre, at the junction between the roads to Lye Green and Botley. Part of Hilltop ward.
- Great Hivings, an area to the north of Chesham on the road to Bellingdon (the latter in Chartridge parish). Part of the ward called Ridgeway.
- Hilltop, residential area to the north-east of the town built on steeply sloping ground. Consists primarily of steel framed bungalows. Also the name of a town council ward.
- Lye Green, hamlet located to the north east of the main town. Part of Newtown ward.
- Lowndes, residential area which includes the Chiltern Hills Academy School, close to the centre of the town, adjacent to Lowndes Park. Also a town council ward.
- Newtown, late Victorian housing development to the north of the town, now incorporated into the enlarged townscape. Also a town council ward.
- Old Town, until the arrival of the Metropolitan Railway in the 19th century was the town's centre. Today, St Mary's Church, the historic houses and streetscape are part of a designated Conservation Area lying to the south of the present town centre with which it comprises St. Mary's ward.
- Pednormead End, an area to the west of the main town, along Missenden Road. Part of St. Mary's ward.
- Pond Park, an area comprising post Second World War housing to the north of the town. Part of the Ridgeway Ward.
- Townsend, Victorian extension to the town comprising commercial premises, later 20th century residential developments and Chesham Grammar School. Also a town council ward.
- Waterside, once a hamlet located just south of the town centre. Several mills sprung up along the River Chess which flows through the area as well as factories. It still retains a distinct character with a large open space known as the Moor. Also a town council ward.

== Landmarks ==
=== Clock tower ===
A clock tower constructed in 1992 stands in Market Square on the site of Chesham's 18th-century town hall demolished in 1965. The turret is a reconstruction of the one built onto the original town hall in the 19th century and features the original glass-dialled clock face and clock mechanism from the mid 19th century.

=== War memorial ===
Chesham war memorial stands in a landscaped garden in the Broadway. It depicts an infantryman with his rifle inverted and commemorates those who fell during the First and Second World Wars. It was designed by the sculptor Arthur George Walker and unveiled in 1921. The inscription reads:- To The Glorious Memory Of The Men Of The Town Who Gave Their Lives And To Honour: All Who Served Or Suffered In Cause Of God King And Country Their Deeds Live After Them Faithful Unto Death.

== Economy ==
=== Agriculture ===
There is evidence during the pre-Norman period of common fields being divided into parcels and strips of land. The Domesday Book records Chesham with sufficient arable land to support four water-powered corn mills on the River Chess producing a surplus of flour exported to London. There was woodland to feed over 1600 pigs and supply timber for local manufacturing of farm tools (ploughshares). Field enclosure started in the early 16th century and although almost completed by the mid 19th century the productivity of Chesham farms provided work for over 450 agricultural labourers. Sheep that grazed on the hillside fields around Chesham provided wool for the cloth making and dying cottage industry which thrived until the 18th century when Yorkshire mills out-competed them.

=== Industrial Revolution ===
Until the 18th century, the economic activity of Chesham had remained largely unchanged since the granting of its town charter in 1257. The commercial planting of beechwoods established Chesham as one of a number of local centres in the Chilterns for the production of turned furniture components and other wooden items often called bodging, produced in local workshops. Mills along the Chess concerned with papermaking and silk weaving continued to operate until the middle of the 19th century, as did 'outworkers' engaged in lace making and straw plaiting, whose employment was impacted on by changes in fashion and due to mechanisation and from cheaper imports from the continent. The mineral-laden, unpolluted water of the Chess made it ideal for growing watercress and this industry flourished in Chesham in the Victorian era, with beds extending along the Chess towards Latimer, continuing until the late 20th century.

=== Manufacturing and brewing ===
In the 18th century, home-based leather trade workers moved to the newly opened Barnes Boot factory, and to the Britannia Boot and Shoe Works towards the end of the 19th century. By this time, there were eight major manufacturers and many small workshops. In 1829 Beechwoods brushmaking factory was opened. At its height there were around 12 factories specialising in brushes made from locally grown beech, with bristles imported mainly from across Asia. The adoption of nylon for brushes was the cause of the downturn with only one manufacturer remaining today, Russell's Brushes.

Nash's Chesham Brewery opened in the High Street in 1841. Two other notable rivals were Darvell's Brewery and Sarah Howe and Sons. Competition led to amalgamations in the 20th century although brewing continued at Chesham Brewery until the 1950s.

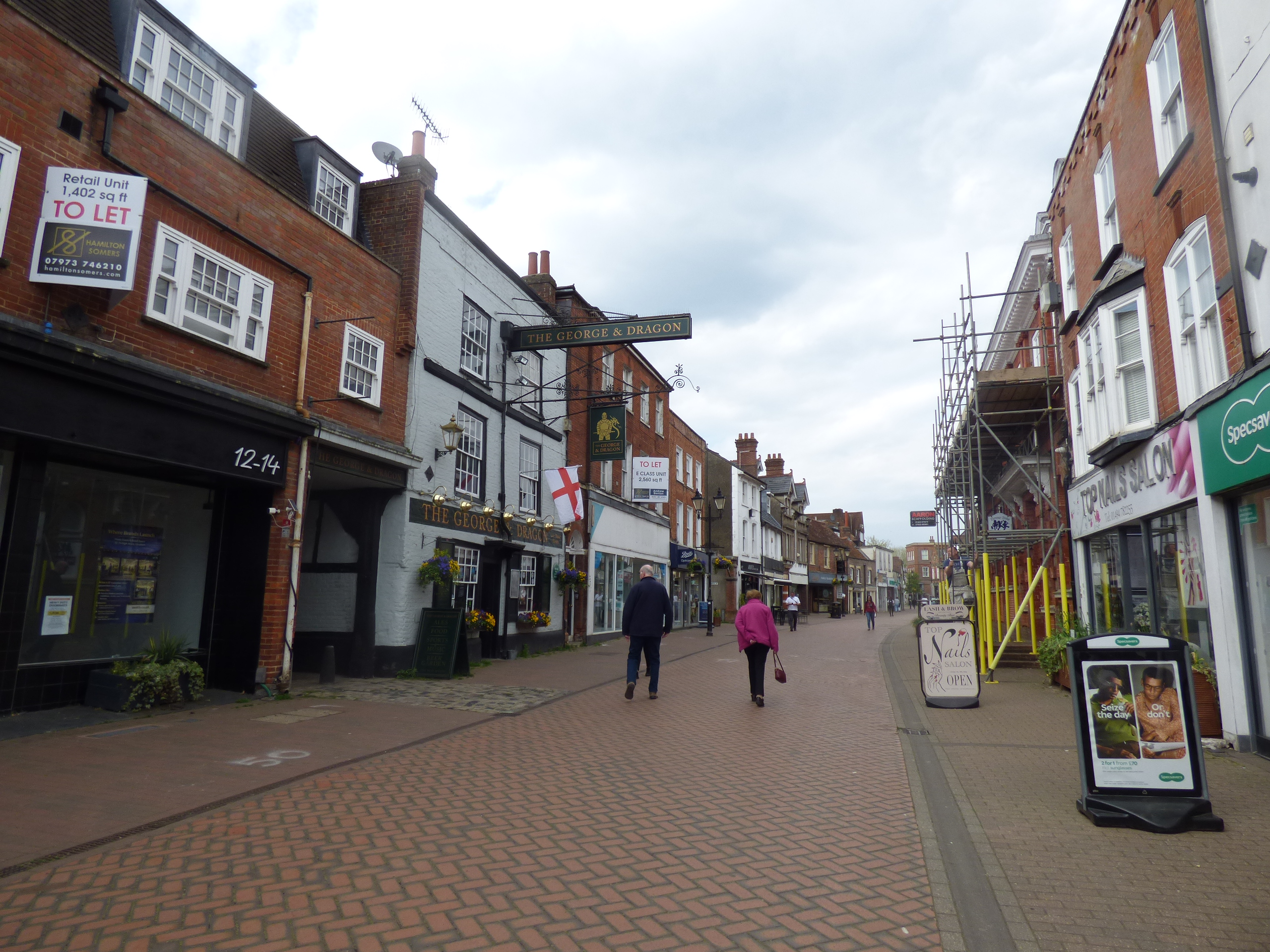
The pedestrianised High Street

=== Commerce today ===
Today Chesham has a diverse economic base comprising many typically small-medium-sized enterprises representing all business sectors. Within the two industrial parks light engineering and fabrication industry is to be found alongside printers and graphic designers or other technology-based firms, wholesalers, distribution and courier businesses. As elsewhere, there has been an expansion of professional business services and consultancies. Chesham High Street was pedestrianised in 1990 and the benefits to the High Street have been felt ever since. It retains some of the character of the old market town with some long-established traditional family retailers and also features a street market on Wednesdays and Saturdays. This individuality was recognised in a survey of town 'high streets' which gave Chesham good marks for its distinctiveness.

== Governance ==
=== Parliamentary representation ===
The town was part of the Aylesbury constituency from 1885 to 1974. Since the boundary changes that were made ahead of the February 1974 general election, Chesham has been in the Chesham & Amersham constituency. The constituency was traditionally solidly Conservative; it never returned a non-Tory candidate until a by-election in June 2021 following the death of previous MP Cheryl Gillan returned the present Liberal Democrat MP, Sarah Green.

=== Local government ===
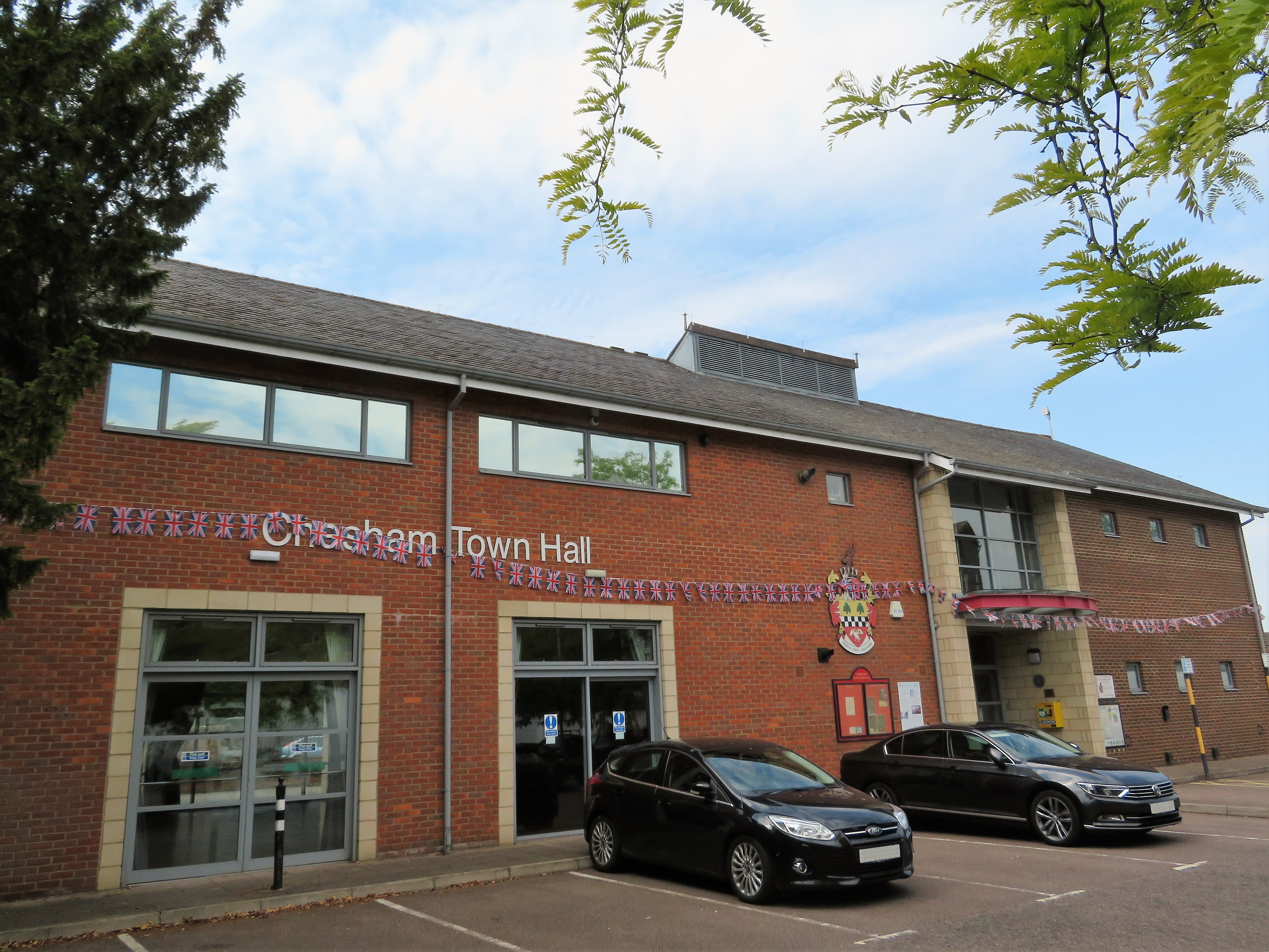
Chesham Town Hall was built 1998 as the headquarters of Chesham Town Council

Chesham has two tiers of local government: Chesham Town Council and Buckinghamshire Council. Chesham Town Council is based at Chesham Town Hall.

The parish of Chesham was made a Local Government District in 1884, governed by a local board, which then became Chesham Urban District Council in 1894. The urban district council was abolished in 1974, merging with the neighbouring Amersham Rural District to become Chiltern District, whilst Chesham Town Council was established as a successor parish covering the area of the abolished urban district. Chiltern District was abolished in 2020, merging with the other Buckinghamshire authorities to become a unitary authority called Buckinghamshire Council.

=== Coat of arms ===
Chesham Urban District Council was granted a coat of arms in 1961, which subsequently transferred to Chesham Town Council. The colours are the same as those of Buckinghamshire County arms. The Chiltern woodlands are denoted by two beech trees. The river Chess is recognised in the black and white chequers and rooks. The swan is inherited from the Dukes of Buckingham. The lilies relate to St Mary, patron saint of the parish church. The buck's head is borrowed from the arms of The Cavendish family, which owned most of the parish lands. The motto is from the Epistle to the Galatians, Chapter V, Verse 13.

== Public services ==
=== Emergency services ===
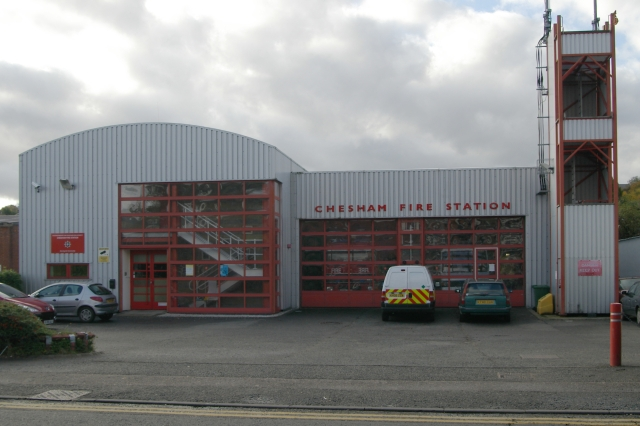
Chesham Fire Station

Thames Valley Police headquartered in Kidlington, Oxfordshire is accountable for the delivery of policing through the town's three Neighbourhood Policing Teams. Buckinghamshire Fire and Rescue Service based in Aylesbury oversees the town's fire and rescue services. There is a fire station located in Bellingdon Road which is supplemented by services from the station at Amersham and other nearby towns. Ambulance services are managed by South Central Ambulance Service NHS Trust based in Bicester, Oxford. The nearest ambulance station is located in Amersham.

=== Health services ===
Buckinghamshire NHS Primary Care Trust has overall responsibility for the provision of health services to the local community. Since the closure of the town's cottage hospital in 2004, the nearest hospitals are Amersham Hospital, Wycombe Hospital and Stoke Mandeville Hospital. After several years of uncertainty, in 2008 the PCT confirmed it was proceeding with the Chesham Healthzone Project. Planning approval was granted by the district council in June 2009 for the purpose-built health facility comprising, two GP practices, a pharmacy, consulting, clinical and treatment rooms. Originally scheduled to open in 2010, phase 1 of the Chess Medical Centre opened in December 2011.

=== Utilities ===
Veolia Water Central supplies drinking water to the town extracted from the River Chess and Misbourne and from aquifers in the Chiltern Hills. Thames Water undertakes waste water treatment and has a sewage treatment works beside the River Chess on Latimer Road to the south of the town. Chiltern District Council is responsible for waste management and collection and disposal is currently carried out on its behalf by Serco. EDF Energy provides electricity supply for the town.

== Religion ==
The oldest church building in Chesham is St. Mary's Church which dates from at least the 12th century. Chesham has a long history of religious dissent, such as the persecuted Lollards, followers of the John Wycliffe tradition. One of them, Thomas Harding, was martyred on White Hill, near Dungrove Farm, in 1532. The Amersham Martyrs Memorial commemorates the execution of local Lollards in Amersham, and there are memorials to Thomas Harding in the churchyard and on White Hill. The 17th, 18th and 19th centuries saw the rapid growth of non-conformism especially Baptists. During the English civil war there were groups of Quakers, Baptists and Presbyterians. Broadway Baptist Church dates back to at least 1706 and had its 300th anniversary celebrations in Chesham in 2006. Its roots are in the Chesham and Berkhamsted Baptist Church which dates back to 1640.

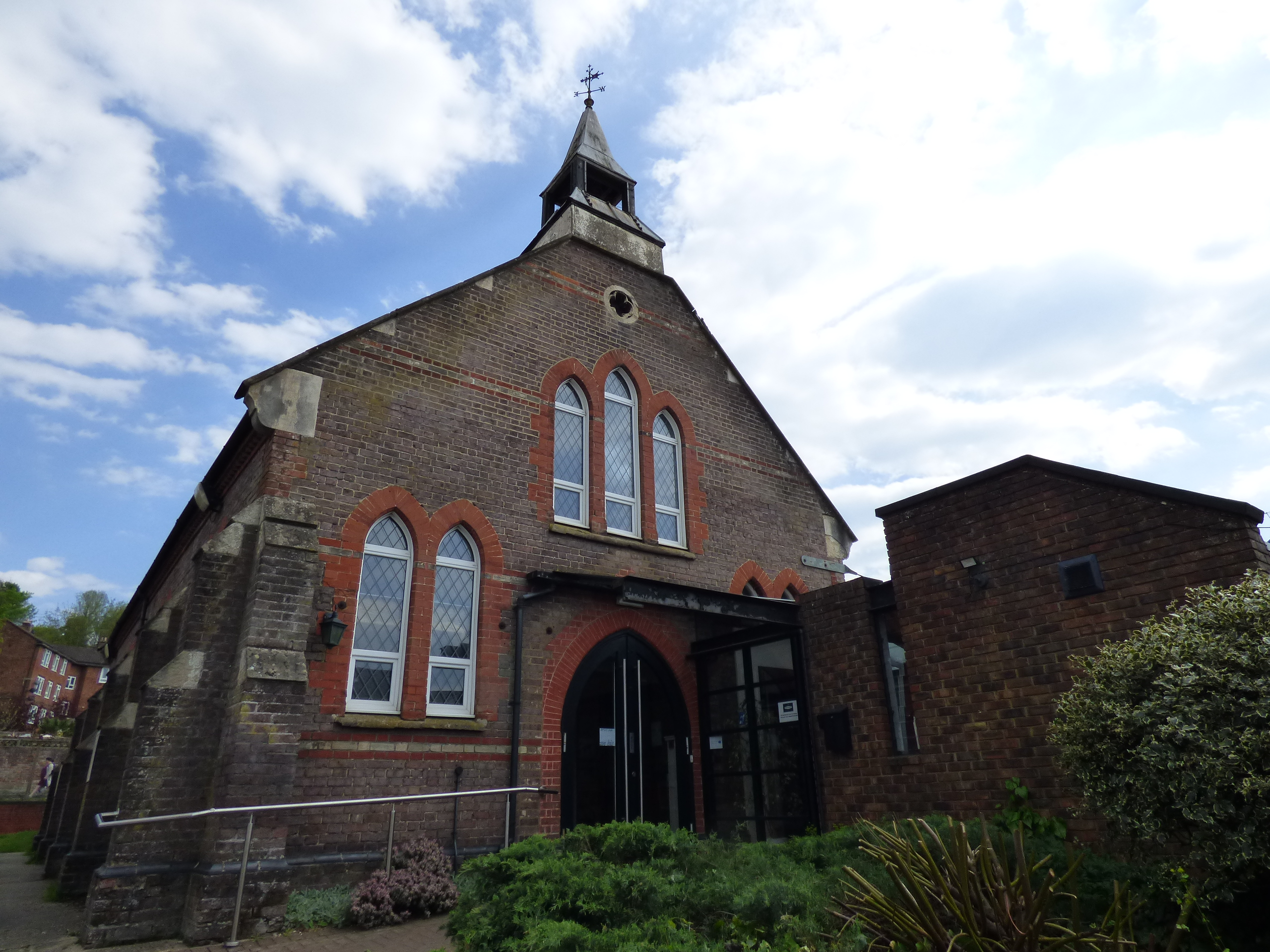
Emmanuel Church in Broad Street

Today Chesham has four Baptist churches and four Anglican churches. There is a United Reformed Church in The Broadway, a Roman Catholic church in Berkhampstead Road, a Methodist chapel in Bellingdon Road, an historic Quaker Friends Meeting House in Bellingdon Road, and The King's Church on Red Lion Street. Almost all of the Christian churches of Chesham work collectively as part of the Churches Together for Chesham (CTfC) group. Other religious groups include Chesham Spiritualist Church in Higham Road and the Jehovah's Witnesses off Bellingdon Road.

During the Second World War, the first recorded Jewish congregation was founded by families evacuated from London who used to meet at the cricket pavilion. After the war, they combined with the Jewish community in Amersham which met at the synagogue in Amersham-on-the-Hill until 1968. This was succeeded by a Liberal Jewish community formed in 1990 which now meets at Chesham Grammar School.

During the second half of the 20th century, a sizeable Muslim community became established in the town. Chesham Mosque, the first purpose-built mosque, was completed in 2005 and is located in Bellingdon Road.

== Demography ==
Religion	%
Buddhist	0.4
Christian	54.4
Hindu	0.9
Jewish	0.3
Muslim	8.2
Sikh	0.3
No religion	27.3
Other religion	0.5
Not stated	7.6

Age	%
0–9	13.1
10–19	12.2
20–29	11.0
30–44	21.7
45–59	21.0
60–74	14.3
75–89	7.0
90+	0.7

Ethnicity	%
White British	80.7
White Other	5.1
Mixed origin	2.6
Indian	1.3
Pakistani	7.3
Bangladeshi	0.3
Black Caribbean	0.4
Black African	0.6
Chinese	0.4
Other	0.4

Population	Total
1801	3,969
1831	5,388
1851	6,098
1871	6,488
1901	7,245
1931	8,812
1951	11,433
1961	16,297
1971 †	20,466
1981	20,447
1990	20,214
2001	20,358

Demographics based on 2011 census for the population of Chesham:

- Population of Chesham parish in 2011 was 21,483 comprising 10,600 males and 10,883 females.
- Status: 51.2% married, 0.2% in civil partnership, 34.5% single (including widowed, divorced etc.)
- Housing: 67.6% owner occupied, 0.9% shared ownership, 20.6% rented (public sector) 10.1% rented (private sector)
- Car ownership: 83% of households in the town own a car.
- Work/studying: 54% employed, 13.2% self-employed, 2.4% studying
- Not working: 12.9% retired, 5.9% unemployed, 5.0% caring for family, 2.8% unable to work
- Travel to work: 66.0% car, 11.5% train, 2.4% bus, 1.8% motor/bicycle, 10.0% on foot, 6.8% at home.

† Prior to boundary changes in 1974 reducing size of Chesham Town area

== Transport ==
=== Rail ===
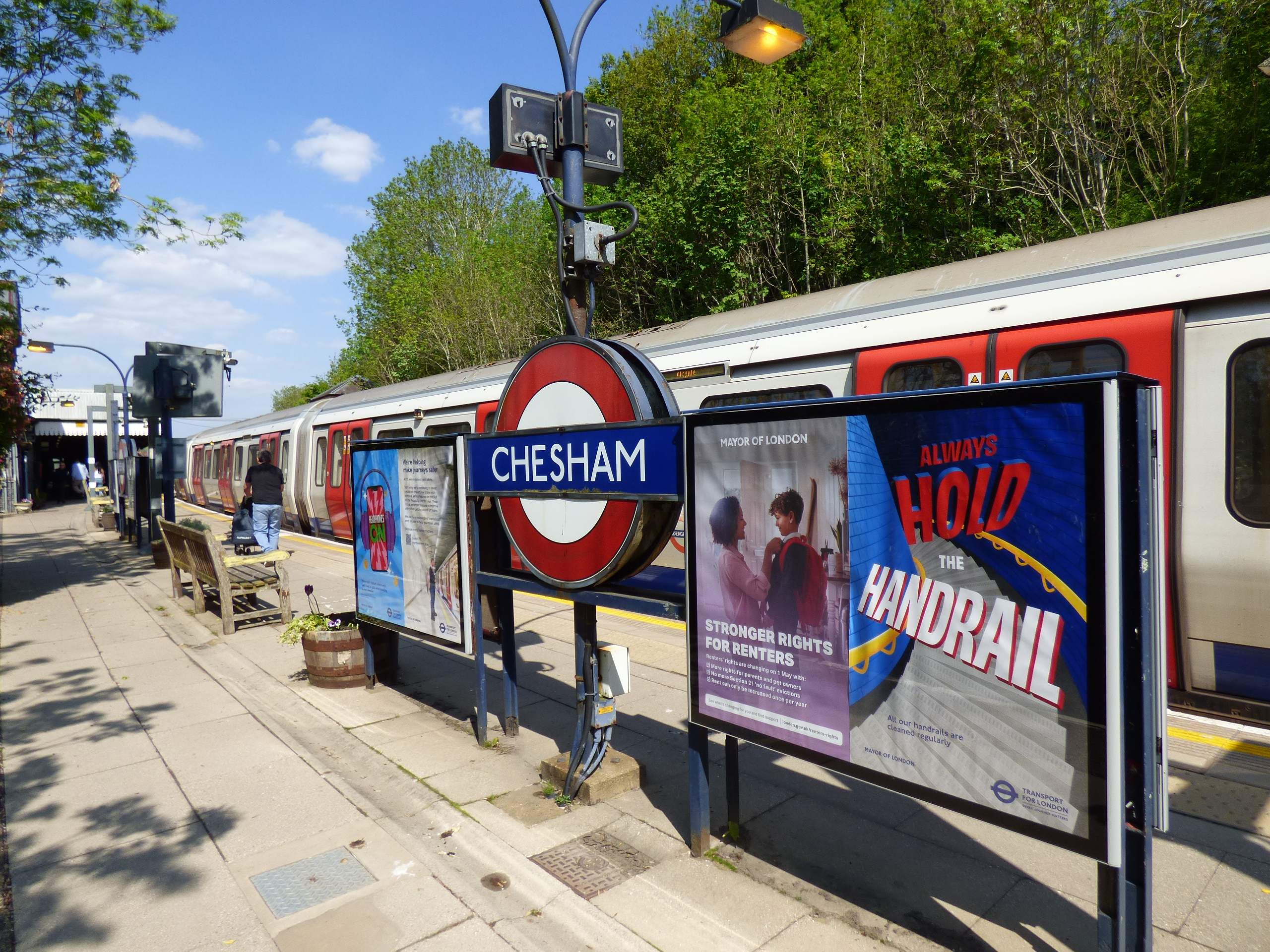
Chesham Station is on the Metropolitan Line

Chesham tube station, close to the town centre, is the terminus of the Chesham branch, a single-track spur off the London Underground Metropolitan line connecting to Chalfont & Latimer station. The station was opened on 8 July 1889 by the Metropolitan Railway (MR). The line had been intended to extend to Tring with connections to the London and North Western Railway's West Coast Main Line. However, the MR chose an alternative route across the Chilterns and so the idea was abandoned and the Metropolitan line continued to Aylesbury via Amersham. There were some sizeable goods yards beyond the station, which were closed and now function as Waitrose's car park except for one portion occupied by coal merchants.

In 1959 electrification of the Metropolitan line to Chesham provided a more reliable connection to London. With the cessation of London Underground services to Aylesbury in 1961 and to Ongar in 1994, Chesham became the furthest location served from central London, in terms of both distance and travelling time. Prior to December 2010, apart from a few direct trains to London at peak times, a shuttle service operated to and from Chalfont & Latimer. Since then the town has benefited from direct trains to London all day.

The nearest National Rail connections are at Amersham, although the LU line also connects directly to Chalfont & Latimer station, from where the Metropolitan line and Chiltern Railways provide a joint service with Metropolitan line trains travelling to Baker Street and Aldgate and Chiltern Railways trains travelling to Marylebone. There is also access to London via Berkhamsted railway station on the West Coast Main Line.

=== Roads ===
In contrast to other towns in south Buckinghamshire, Chesham historically was not well served by road transport links. The stage coach bypassed the town and, unlike Amersham, there were no turnpikes and consequently roads were poorly maintained. Significant change occurred in the post Second World War period with the opening of the M1 motorway. The A416 now runs through the town, from Amersham to Berkhamsted, and connects the town to the more recently upgraded A41. The A416 was diverted around the High Street and later upgraded to be dual-lane. Although these improvements enable more through traffic, traffic congestion has increased.

=== Bus services ===
Bus companies running local services include Carousel Buses, Red Rose, Redline and Red Eagle. Residential areas of the town are connected with the central shopping-area. Chesham is also connected by services to nearby Amersham, and further afield to High Wycombe, Hemel Hempstead, and Uxbridge. Less frequent services run to Aylesbury and to surrounding villages.

=== Car usage and parking ===
There are six pay and display car parks in the town, managed by Chiltern District Council. This demand for parking reflects the relatively high car usage, a result of both affluence and the limited public transport provision in rural areas. As a consequence Chiltern District has the 4th highest carbon footprint of all local authorities.

=== Cycling ===
There is limited provision for cycle use within the town. The town is one setting off point for exploring the Chilterns and cycling heritage trails have been developed by the district authority, two of which are centred on countryside around Chesham.

=== Air transport ===
Luton airport is 15 miles away and Heathrow airport 22 miles away. The Bovingdon stack is directly above the town.

== Education ==
=== Primary education ===
Between the 1960s and the mid-1990s Primary education provision in Chesham was organised into First (ages 4–8) and Middle (ages 8 – 12) with some Combined Schools taking pupils across the whole age range (4 -12). In 1996 the arrangements were modified and the age of transfer to Secondary education was changed to age 11. The schools still retain some elements of the previous arrangement reflected in their names. There are six Primary Schools within Chesham with catchment areas based on post codes: – Elmtree First School, Newtown Infant School, Brushwood Junior School, Thomas Harding Junior School, Ivingswood Academy (previously Little Spring Primary School), Waterside Primary Academy. Attendance by Chesham children at some of the village schools close to the town is popular.

=== Secondary education ===
At secondary level, Buckinghamshire continues to operate a system of selective education with pupils sitting the eleven plus exam to determine entry to either a Grammar school or Secondary Modern School (also known locally as an Upper School). Two Secondary Schools are located in the town: – Chiltern Hills Academy, a co-educational Church of England Academy, previously known as Chesham Park Community College which was formed from the merger of Lowndes School and Cestreham School) and Chesham Grammar School, a co-educational grammar school, which until May 2010 was called Chesham High School. Chesham also falls within the catchment areas of two further grammar schools, Dr Challoner's Grammar School for boys' in Amersham and Dr Challoner's High School for girls in Little Chalfont. In the wider area there are also a number of fee-paying schools. Chesham Preparatory School is an independent school opened in 1938 in the town which later relocated to the outskirts at Orchard Leigh, providing fee-paying and scholarship-supported education.

=== Special, further and adult education provision ===
Chesham is the location of a nationally renowned special school, Heritage House School which first opened in April 1968 and caters for pupils between the ages of 2 and 19 with severe learning difficulties. A Further education college Amersham & Wycombe College was founded in 1973 and has one of its four campuses in the town on the former Cestreham Senior Boys School at Lycrome Road. The college caters for a range of student cohorts with 2000 students on full-time courses and 5000 on a part-time bases. Adult learning is provided a four sites in the town. Chesham Adult Learning Centre in Charteridge Lane, ElmTree School, ElmTree Hill, The Douglas McMinn Centre in East Street and The White Hill Centre White Hill. The Chess Valley section of the Chiltern University of the Third Age (U3A) was formed in October 2008 and meets at St Mary's Church.

== Culture and recreation ==
=== Community facilities ===
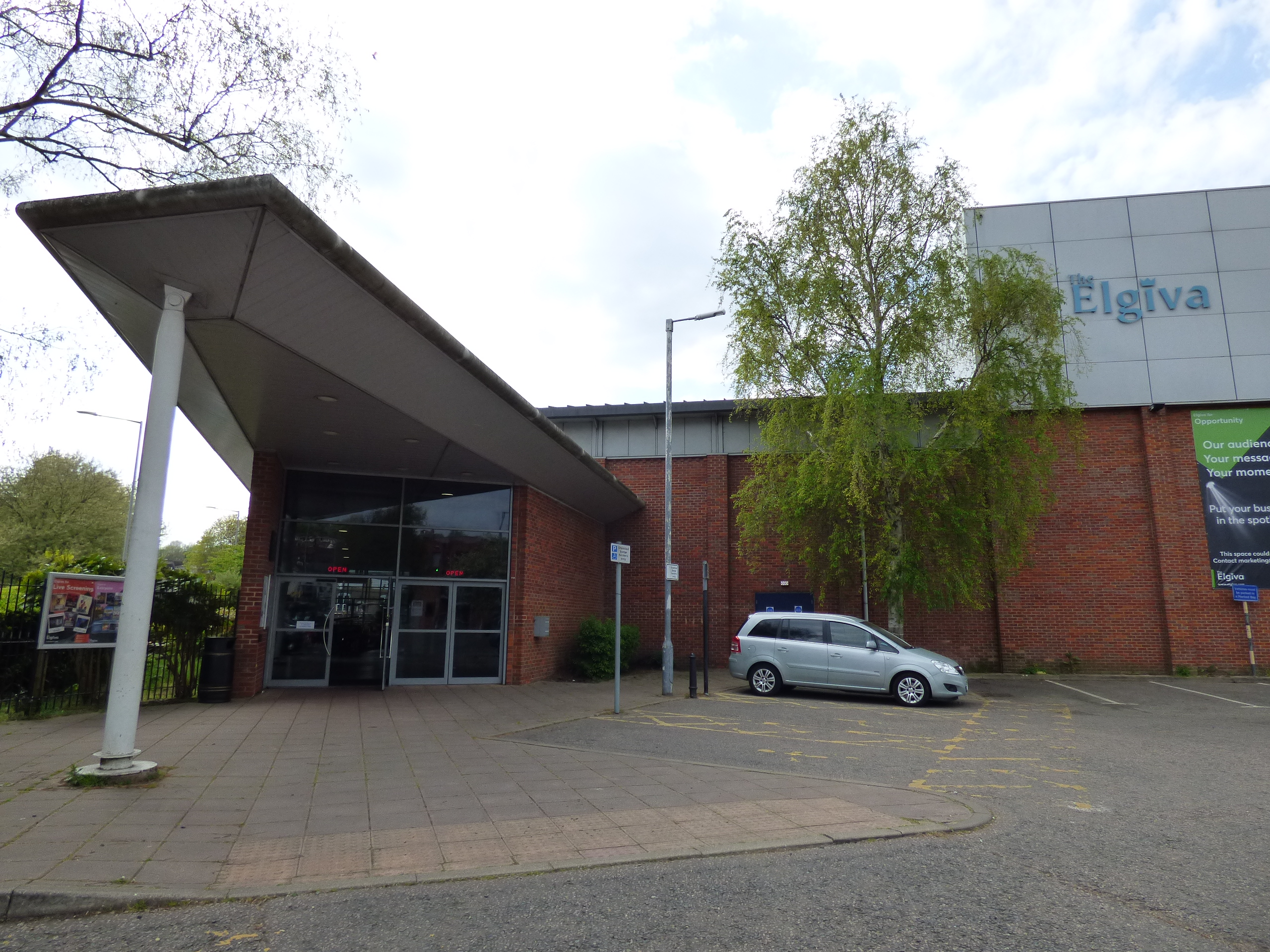
The Elgiva

The Elgiva Hall opened on its original location in 1976. In 1998, having made way for an enlarged supermarket development the Elgiva was rebuilt as a purpose-built theatre on its current site and reopened as the New Elgiva. Now rebranded The Elgiva it is a 300 seated/400 standing capacity theatre, with a Dolby Digital 35mm cinema and is owned and managed by Chesham Town Council. The Elgiva presents a wide-ranging programme of professional and amateur theatre productions, musicals, comedy, dance, one night shows and concerts, pantomimes, films, exhibitions and other public and private events by both professional and community organisations. The Little Theatre by the Park is a facility owned by the Town Council and leased to the Little Theatre Trustees. It is the home to the Chesham Bois Catholic Players and is used by other local theatre companies.

Chesham Museum is a newly established museum for the town and surrounding area which opened in 2004 having first been conceived in 1981. Initially it was housed in temporary premises at The Stables behind the Gamekeeper's Lodge Pub in Bellingdon Road. Since October 2009 it has been located at 15 Market Square. There is also an annual Schools of Chesham carnival, Beer festival and bi-annual Chesham festival.

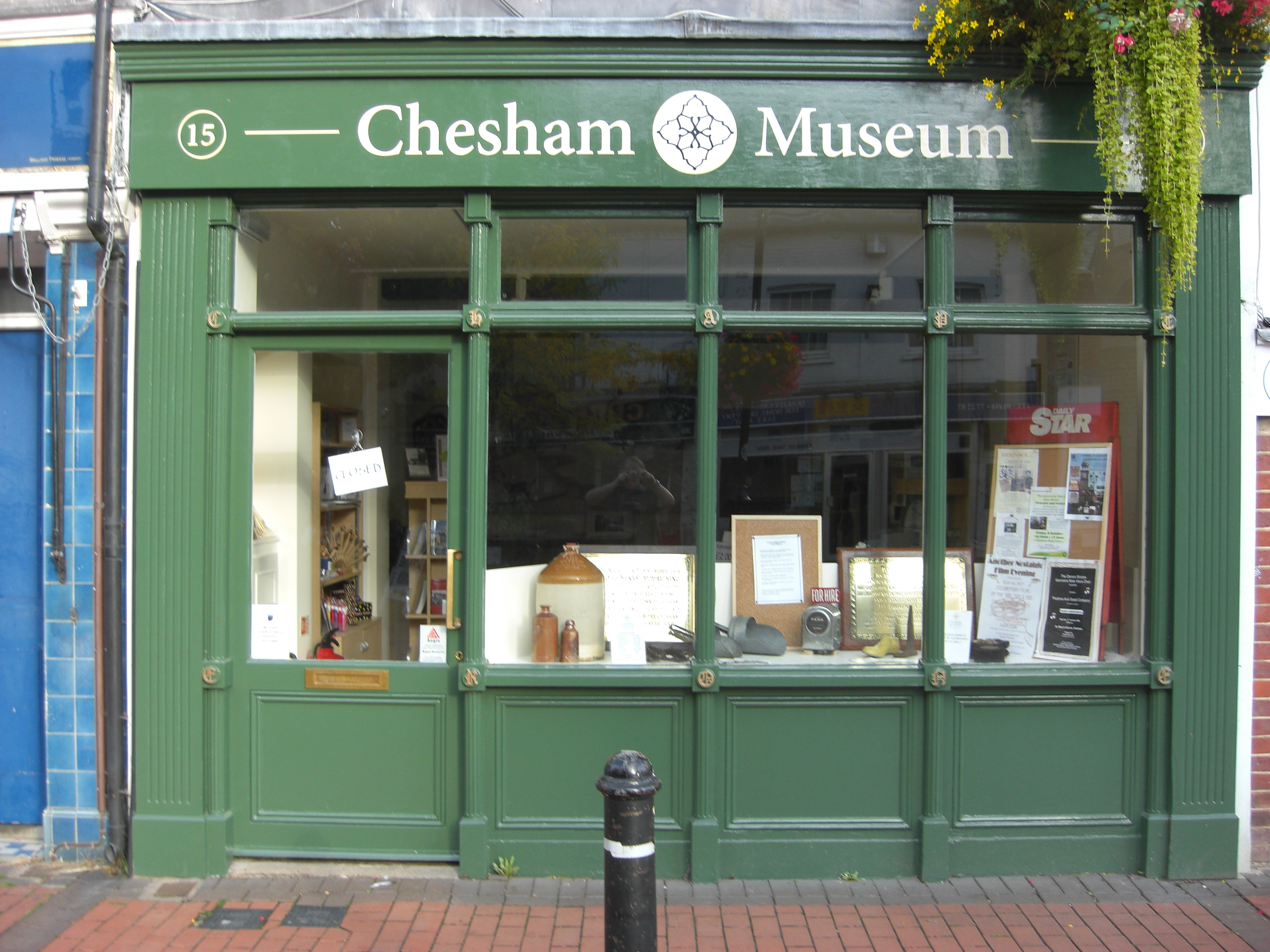
Chesham Museum

Chesham Library opened in Chesham in 1923 in a room at Cemetery Lodge on Berkhamsted Road. In 1927, it moved into new premises at 33 High Street on the Broadway which it shared with Chesham Urban District Council. After the war it expanded. A children's section was added in 1952. In 1971 the library moved to Elgiva Lane, a site it shared with the Elgive Theatre prior to the latter's relocation to new premises. Since then it has been updated to provide better access and improved internal facilities including the evolution of the reference library into a Study Centre. It also houses a special collection of Victorian era children's books including some previously owned by Florence Nightingale.

The White Hill Centre, the site of an old school, is run by Chesham and District Community Association and since 1976 has provided educational, recreational social activities and facilities for societies and the local community to meet. Opposite the town centre is Lowndes Park, a large park with playgrounds and formerly an open air paddling pool. There is a large pond in the park, known as Skottowe's Pond. Lowndes Park was donated to the town of Chesham in 1953. Prior to this it was part of the garden that belonged to the Lowndes family. The Moor, originally an island created by the diversion of the Chess to power mills is today an open space used for recreation. There are two public swimming pools in the town. An outdoor pool at the Moor in Waterside and a roofed pool (and leisure centre), next to Chesham Grammar School at the top of White Hill. Chesham Town Council manages 227 allotments spread across three sites. There are 135 footpaths in the Chesham area and in May 2010 the town became the first in the Chilterns to be recognised as a "Walkers are Welcome Town".

=== Sport ===
Chesham United F.C. is the local football club which plays in the National League South. At the end of the 2009–2010 season it was promoted to the Premier Division. It was formed in 1917 through the merger of Chesham Generals (the team of the Chesham General Baptist church now called Broadway Baptist Church), which was founded in 1887, and Chesham Town FC (started as the football team of Christ Church, Waterside), a founding member of the Southern League which started out in 1894 as Chesham FC. The club's most successful period was during the 1967–68 season when it reached the final of the FA Amateur Cup at Wembley but lost out to Leytonstone F.C. 1–0 in front of a crowd of 54,000. The club has struggled financially and performance-wise over recent years but has recently had a cash injection from a new financial backer. Chesham cricket club was founded in 1848 and is one of the oldest clubs in the Thames Valley Cricket League. Its home ground is at Amy Lane. In addition to four senior Saturday XIs it also runs two Sunday XIs and a women's side. Chesham also has a Junior section, which competes in Buckinghamshire and national competitions. Chesham Rugby union Club ('The Stags'), was founded in 1981 and play rugby for boys, girls and adult men and women at Chiltern Hills Academy. The Stags also run netball teams playing in local leagues for girls and women.

=== Town twinning and cultural exchanges ===
Chesham has twinned with three towns in other countries. It is organised by the Chesham Town Twinning Association. The first link-up was in 1980 with Friedrichsdorf, at the foot of the Taunus Hills near Frankfurt, Germany. Next followed the association with Houilles, a commune of Paris, France, in 1986 and thirdly, in 1995 a tie-up with Archena, in the Murcia region of Spain. Some organisations also have international links. Emmanuel Church is linked with a church in Prague, Czech Republic. Chesham British Legion is linked with its Canadian equivalent in Buckingham, Quebec. Ley Hill Methodist Church is linked with Skopje Methodist Church in Macedonia.

== Media, communications and filmography ==
=== Local news media ===
The local newspaper covering Chesham and the surrounding area, although it no longer has an office based in the town, is the Buckinghamshire Examiner founded in 1889. Another Buckinghamshire newspaper with a circulation area covering Chesham is the Bucks Free Press.

=== Local Radio ===
Radio stations are BBC Three Counties Radio and Heart London. The Ofcom licensed community radio station for the Chilterns is Chiltern Voice

=== Filmography ===
The following TV series and episodes included filming in Chesham's Old Town and pedestrianised High Street:<

- The Professionals Close Quarters (1978) – Hundridge Manor
- Hammer House of Horror: Carpathian Eagle (1980) – Lowndes Park: The Silent Scream (1980) – 68 Broad Street
- Inspector Morse The Day of the Devil (1993) – High Street
- Midsomer Murders: The Axeman Cometh (2007) – Market Sq; Written in Blood (1997) – High St and Old Town; Sins of Commission – High St; Things that Go Bump in the Night (2004) – Market Sq; The Black Book – 15 Market Sq (2009); The Sword of Guillaume (2010) High St, Broadway War Memorial
- Nuzzle and Scratch (2009) – CBeebies programme, Toy Shop episode filmed on the high street outside Harvey Johns
- Scoop (2009) – High Street and Town
- Chucklevision Well Suited (2000) – High Street (opening scene)
- Black Mirror: "The National Anthem" (2011) – desolate shots of the High Street and of an area near The Vale are shown near the end
- The Imitation Game – 73 Church Street appears as Alan Turing's lodging house in Bletchley, and also appears briefly in Dirk Bogarde vehicle The Password Is Courage (1962)
- Doctor Foster – The Chess Medical Centre

== Notable people ==
- Leonard James Ashton, (27 June 1915 – 19 January 2001) was an English Anglican bishop and military chaplain. He was the inaugural Bishop in Cyprus and the Gulf, lived in Chesham.
- Aneurin "Nye" Bevan, Labour politician and father of the National Health Service, moved to Asheridge Farm near Chesham, where he died on 6 July 1960.
- Val Biro children's author of the Gumdrop books lived in Chesham from 1955 to 1969. He died in 2014 aged 92.
- Thomas Pownall Boultbee d.1884 was a clergyman who on his death was buried in the town where he and his son both preached.
- Alfred Alexander Burt served in the Great War and 'for most conspicuous bravery at Cuinchy, France on 27 September 1915 was a recipient of the Victoria Cross. He lived in the town until his death, in 1962, aged 67.
- Alice Connor, actress, attended Chartridge Combined School in Chesham.
- Roger Crab, who lived in what is now The Drawingroom Art Gallery and Restaurant, in Francis Yard was an eccentric who Lewis Carroll is supposed to have based his "Mad Hatter" character from Alice in Wonderland on.
- Andrew Davis b.1944 is a British conductor who was born in nearby Asheridge and grew up in the town.
- Edward Field b.1828 in Chesham was a Rear Admiral in the Royal Navy and later a member of parliament.
- Arthur Ellis Franklin (1857–1938), British merchant banker, social worker and antiquarian, at Chartridge Lodge.
- Stephen Fry spent part of his childhood in Chesham, attending Chesham Prep School as detailed in his autobiography Moab is my Washpot. He lived in Stanley Avenue.
- Joan Gardner b.1911 in Chesham became an actress of stage and screen.
- Thomas Harding, 16th-century English religious dissident. He was from Chesham and was executed as a Lollard in 1532. He fought for the right to read the scriptures in English. He was accused of heresy and interrogated in Chesham parish church. He was found guilty and was burnt at the stake in 1532, at Chesham in the Pell, near Botley.
- Charles Townsend Harrison art historian and critic was born in Chesham in 1942.
- Rob Hoey, comedian, actor and musician, lives in Chesham.
- Alex Horne, standup comedian currently lives in Chesham.
- Eddie Howe, football manager of Newcastle United was born in neighbouring Amersham but grew up in Chesham.
- Arthur Lasenby Liberty, founder of the famous Liberty store in London, lived in a house next to the George & Dragon in the High Street.
- William Lowndes (1652–1724) British Politician and Secretary to the Treasury who built and lived at Bury House as did many of his relatives and descendants
- Harold Mattingly d.1964 was a historian and numismatist who lived and is buried in the town.
- Margaret Mee, (1909–1988) was born in the town and attended Dr Challoner's Grammar School, Amersham. Studied art, and with her husband, Greville Mee moved to Brazil where she taught art and became a renowned botanical artist, particularly the flora of the Amazon rainforest.
- Arthur T. F. Reynolds (1909–2001) was born in the town and later became a Protestant missionary in China and Japan. He was the author or translator of a number of books.
- Irene Rooke, theatre and film actress, married to Milton Rosmer, lived the latter period of her life until her death in 1958 in the town.
- Milton Rosmer, film actor, director and screenwriter was living in the town at the time of his death in 1971.
- Ghayasuddin Siddiqui, leading Islamic intellectual and community leader. Founder and director of the Muslim Institute and of the Muslim Parliament of Great Britain. Lives in Chesham.
- Guy Siner, who starred in 'Allo 'Allo!, currently resides in Chesham.
- Francis Wilson, TV weatherman. Used to live in Chesham.

== Freedom of the Town ==
The following people have received the Freedom of the Town of Chesham.

- Vincent Crompton: 14 May 2015
- Katherine Merchant: 9 May 2019.
- Rocky Clarke: 9 May 2019
- Mora Walker: 9 May 2019
- Rod Culverhouse: 9 May 2019.
- Philip Folly
- Helen Salisbury: 27 September 2021

== See also ==
Nearby towns, villages and hamlets

- Amersham
- Asheridge
- Ashley Green
- Ballinger
- Bellingdon
- Buckland Common
- Chartridge
- Chesham Bois
- Cholesbury
- Flaunden
- Hawridge
- Hyde Heath
- Latimer
- Ley Hill
- Lye Green
- Pednor
- St Leonards
- Whelpley Hill

Other articles

- Lord Chesham
