= Abbey Christian School =

Private school in London, United Kingdom

Coordinates: 51.5330°N 0.1780°W

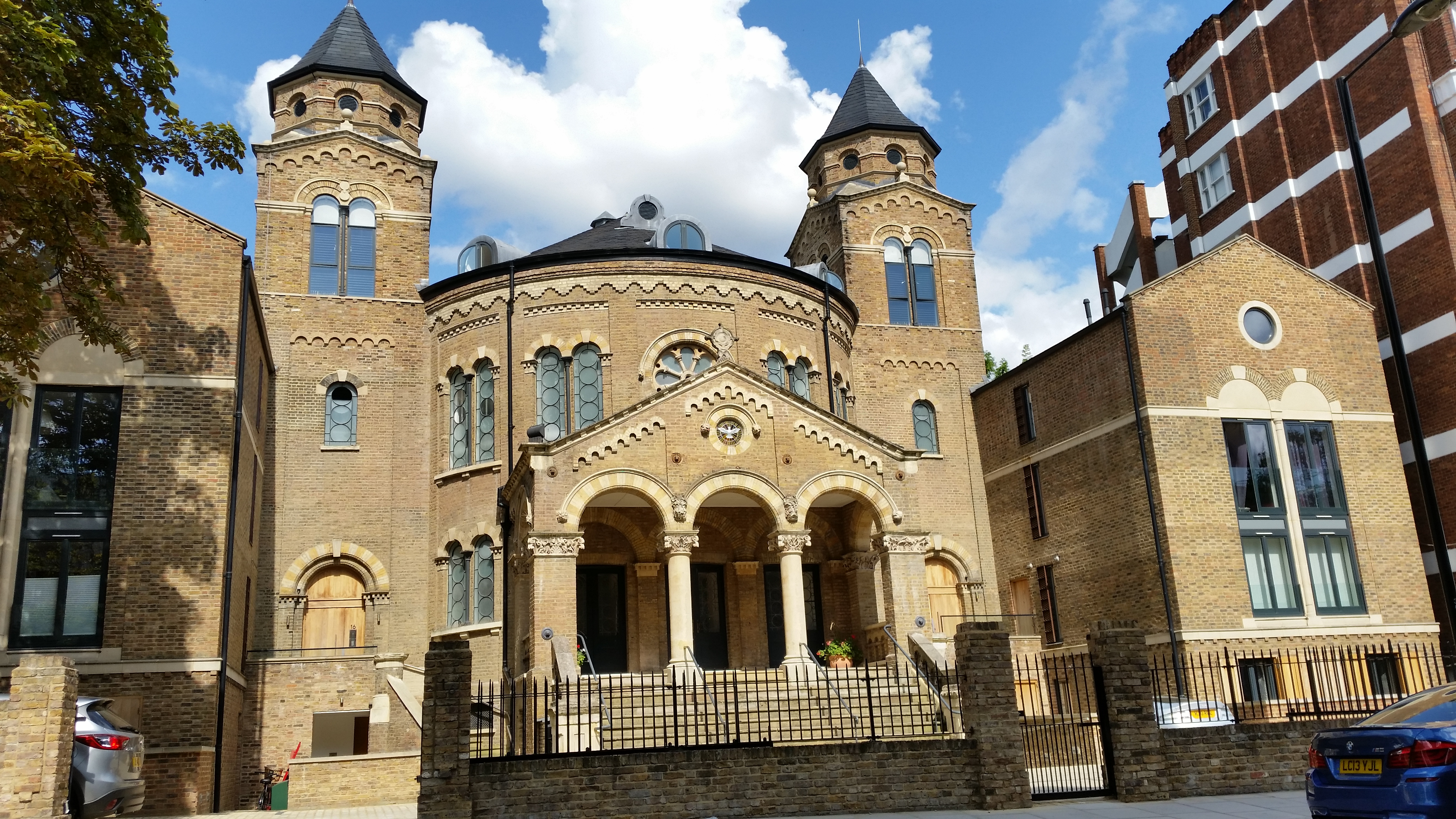
Abbey Road Baptist Church, 16 Abbey Road, London NW8, seen from the west

The Abbey Christian School was a school set up to teach English as a foreign language to prospective Christian missionaries. It was based in the extensive premises of Abbey Road Baptist Church in London, England and ran for forty years, from 1962 to 2002.

The school was set up by Pastor LR Barnard of Abbey Road Baptist Church. From small beginnings it grew until it was taking in 60 to 70 students each term from countries all around the world. It closed in June 2002.
