= 2011 Tendring District Council election =

2011 UK local government election

← 2007	5 May 2011	2015 →

All 60 seats to Tendring District Council 31 seats needed for a majority

	First party	Second party	Third party
Party	Conservative	Labour	Tendring First
Last election	28	6	10
Seats before	28	6	10
Seats won	33	9	8
Seat change	▲5	▲3	▼2
Popular vote	19,199	8,989	5,946
Percentage	39.7%	18.6%	12.3%
Swing	▼0.1%	▲3.4%	▲0.4%
	Fourth party	Fifth party	Sixth party
Party	Liberal Democrats	Independent	Residents
Last election	6	3	2
Seats before	6	5	2
Seats won	2	5	3
Seat change	▼4	▲2	▲1
Popular vote	4,835	4,137	1,991
Percentage	10.0%	8.6%	4.1%
Swing	▼4.8%	▲0.6%	▲1.0%
- Results of the 2011 Tendring District Council election
Council control before election
No overall control
Council control after election
Conservative

The 2011 Tendring District Council election for the Tendring District Council was held in May 2011 as part of the wider local elections.

== Summary ==
=== Election result ===
2011 Tendring District Council election
Party	Candidates	Seats	Gains	Losses	Net gain/loss	Seats %	Votes %	Votes	+/−
Conservative	60	33	10	5	▲5	55.0	39.7	19,199	–0.1
Labour	42	9	4	1	▲3	15.0	18.6	8,989	+3.4
Tendring First	20	8	2	4	▼2	13.3	12.3	5,946	+0.4
Independent	15	5	2	0	▲2	8.3	8.6	4,137	+0.6
Residents	3	3	1	0	▲1	5.0	4.1	1,991	+1.0
Liberal Democrats	20	2	0	4	▼4	3.3	10.0	4,835	–4.8
Green	6	0	0	0	Steady	0.0	2.7	1,329	+2.2
UKIP	4	0	0	0	Steady	0.0	1.9	939	+1.2
Community Representatives	6	0	0	5	▼5	0.0	1.6	752	–4.4
BNP	2	0	0	0	Steady	0.0	0.5	236	N/A

== Ward results ==
=== Alresford ===
Alresford
Party	Candidate	Votes	%	±%
Liberal Democrats	Gary Scott	688	74.9	+21.5
Conservative	Luke Edwards	148	16.1	−20.6
Labour	Terry Ripo	82	8.9	−1.0
Majority				
Turnout				
Liberal Democrats hold		Swing		

=== Alton Park ===
Alton Park (2 seats)
Party	Candidate	Votes	%	±%
Labour Co-op	Delia Aldis*	567	59.6	+10.0
Labour Co-op	Graham Caines	541	56.8	+9.5
Conservative	John Hughes*	431	45.3	–5.1
Conservative	Colin Madge	365	38.3	–4.7
Turnout		~1,049	30.8	+3.9
Registered electors		3,407		
Labour Co-op hold				
Labour Co-op gain from Conservative				

=== Ardleigh and Little Bromley ===
Ardleigh and Little Bromley
Party	Candidate	Votes	%	±%
Conservative	Neil Stock	457	54.2	
Liberal Democrats	Graham Potter	201	23.8	
Independent	Steve Wilcox	185	21.9	
Majority				
Turnout				
Conservative hold		Swing		

=== Beaumont and Thorpe ===
Beaumont and Thorpe
Party	Candidate	Votes	%	±%
Independent	José Powell	494	56.9	
Conservative	Mike Brown	374	43.1	
Majority				
Turnout				
Independent hold		Swing		

=== Bockings Elm ===
Bockings Elm (2 seats)
Party	Candidate	Votes	%	±%
Liberal Democrats	Harry Shearing*	539	39.1	–6.6
Conservative	Siggy Challinor	505	36.6	–1.0
Liberal Democrats	Brian Whitson*	500	36.3	–4.6
Conservative	Trevor Durham	457	33.2	–3.6
Labour	Ray Rogers	305	22.1	+5.4
Labour	James Osben	297	21.5	+4.8
Turnout		~1,378	39.3	+1.8
Registered electors		3,507		
Liberal Democrats hold				
Conservative gain from Liberal Democrats				

=== Bradfield, Wrabness & Wix ===
Bradfield, Wrabness & Wix
Party	Candidate	Votes	%	±%
Conservative	Matthew Patten	502	58.2	+13.3
Green	Tim Glover	360	41.8	+25.1
Majority				
Turnout				
Conservative hold		Swing		

=== Brightlingsea ===
Brightlingsea (3 seats)
Party	Candidate	Votes	%	±%
Independent	Graham Steady*	1,584	53.7	–4.2
Independent	Jayne Chapman	1,553	52.6	N/A
Conservative	Alan Goggin*	1,028	34.8	–20.1
Independent	Karen Yallop	907	30.7	N/A
Conservative	Vivien Chapman*	744	25.2	–9.8
Labour	Colin Oliver	586	19.9	+3.3
Liberal Democrats	David Dixon	492	16.7	–8.9
Conservative	Liz Eidey	480	16.3	+4.3
Turnout		~2,952	46.1	+4.1
Registered electors		6,403		
Independent hold				
Independent gain from Conservative				
Conservative hold				

=== Burrsville ===
Burrsville
Party	Candidate	Votes	%	±%
Conservative	Pam Sambridge	502	56.0	
Labour	Brigid Prosser	179	20.0	
Liberal Democrats	Keith Lever	142	15.8	
Green	Chris Southall	74	8.2	
Majority				
Turnout				
Conservative hold		Swing		

=== Frinton ===
Frinton (2 seats)
Party	Candidate	Votes	%	±%
Conservative	Giles Watling	1,047	57.1	–0.3
Conservative	Nick Turner	971	53.0	–1.2
Tendring First	Terry Allen	686	34.7	–5.2
Tendring First	Barrie Dunwell	478	26.1	–11.2
Labour	David Bolton	139	7.6	N/A
Labour	Kayleigh Hegarty	126	6.9	N/A
Turnout		~1,834	54.2	+3.3
Registered electors		3,383		
Conservative hold				
Conservative hold				

=== Golf Green ===
Golf Green (2 seats)
Party	Candidate	Votes	%	±%
Labour	Dan Casey	667	41.9	+12.9
Labour	Nick Brown	552	34.7	+9.3
Conservative	John Chittock	550	34.6	+15.3
Conservative	Roy Raby	458	28.8	+10.2
Independent	Kevin Watson*	283	17.8	N/A
Independent	Bernard Leatherdale	193	12.1	N/A
BNP	Keith Beaumont	132	8.3	N/A
Turnout		~1,591	40.5	+0.8
Registered electors		3,929		
Labour gain from Community Rep.				
Labour gain from Community Rep.				

=== Great & Little Oakley ===
Great & Little Oakley
Party	Candidate	Votes	%	±%
Tendring First	Tom Howard	342	43.0	
Conservative	Tanya Ferguson	313	39.3	
UKIP	Christopher Warner	141	17.7	
Majority				
Turnout				
Tendring First gain from Conservative		Swing		

=== Great Bentley ===
Great Bentley
Party	Candidate	Votes	%	±%
Conservative	Lynda McWilliams	603	67.9	
Liberal Democrats	Robert Taylor	285	32.1	
Majority				
Turnout				
Conservative hold		Swing		

=== Hamford ===
Hamford (2 seats)
Party	Candidate	Votes	%	±%
Conservative	Mark Platt	717	44.1	+10.0
Tendring First	Iris Johnson*	635	39.0	–6.9
Conservative	Maurice Alexander	620	38.1	N/A
Tendring First	Anna Hockridge*	520	32.0	–7.2
Labour	Gary Henderson	248	15.2	N/A
Labour	Susan Henderson	239	14.7	N/A
Turnout		~1,627	50.6	+7.5
Registered electors		3,216		
Conservative gain from Tendring First				
Tendring First hold				

=== Harwich East ===
Harwich East
Party	Candidate	Votes	%	±%
Labour	Ivan Henderson	473	59.1	
Conservative	Tony Woods	202	25.3	
Community Rep.	Jim Brown	64	8.0	
Independent	Michael Gardner	61	7.6	
Majority				
Turnout				
Labour hold		Swing		

=== Harwich East Central ===
Harwich East Central (2 seats)
Party	Candidate	Votes	%	±%
Labour	Garry Calver*	618	42.9	+4.8
Labour	Dave McLeod*	533	37.0	+0.4
Conservative	Barry Brown	515	35.7	+1.5
Conservative	Robert Day	478	33.2	+2.1
UKIP	John Brown	285	19.8	N/A
Community Rep.	David Smith	166	11.5	–5.8
Turnout		~1,442	40.3	+2.7
Registered electors		3,577		
Labour hold				
Labour hold				

=== Harwich West ===
Harwich West (2 seats)
Party	Candidate	Votes	%	±%
Labour	Les Double*	683	42.2	+8.2
Conservative	Ricky Callender*	671	41.4	+10.9
Labour	John Thurlow	557	34.4	+3.9
Conservative	Hugh Thompson	547	33.8	+4.8
Community Rep.	Ann Price	180	11.1	–13.1
Independent	Lindsay Glenn	177	10.9	–11.5
Community Rep.	Rhonda Gee	138	8.5	–10.1
Turnout		1,619	41.8	+7.2
Registered electors		3,874		
Labour hold				
Conservative hold				

=== Harwich West Central ===
Harwich West Central (2 seats)
Party	Candidate	Votes	%	±%
Labour	Jo Henderson	631	40.6	+13.1
Conservative	Claire Callender	534	34.4	+8.7
Conservative	Colleen O'Neill	445	28.6	+6.6
Community Rep.	Steven Henderson*	342	21.9	–24.8
Community Rep.	David Rutson*	311	20.0	–22.4
Independent	Jacky Wares	231	14.9	N/A
Independent	Helen Gardner	199	12.8	N/A
Turnout		~1,554	41.1	+5.0
Registered electors		3,782		
Labour gain from Community Rep.				
Conservative gain from Community Rep.				

=== Haven ===
Haven
Party	Candidate	Votes	%	±%
Residents	Joy Broderick	650	70.7	
Conservative	Roger Payne	270	29.3	
Majority				
Turnout				
Residents gain from Conservative		Swing		

=== Holland and Kirby ===
Holland and Kirby (2 seats)
Party	Candidate	Votes	%	±%
Tendring First	Robert Bucke*	997	53.7	N/A
Tendring First	Mark Cossens*	953	51.3	N/A
Conservative	Charles Braithwaite	648	34.9	N/A
Conservative	Iain Wicks	482	25.9	N/A
Labour	Brian Theadom	259	13.9	N/A
Labour	Cameron Scott	160	8.6	N/A
Turnout		~1,858	48.4	N/A
Registered electors		3,838		
Tendring First hold				
Tendring First hold				

=== Homelands ===
Homelands
Party	Candidate	Votes	%	±%
Conservative	Mick Page	396	46.6	
Tendring First	David Lines	327	38.5	
Labour	Sarah Williams	126	14.8	
Majority				
Turnout				
Conservative gain from Tendring First		Swing		

=== Lawford ===
Lawford (2 seats)
Party	Candidate	Votes	%	±%
Conservative	Val Guglielmi*	664	44.7	+0.7
Conservative	Keith Simons	564	37.9	–5.8
Labour	John Ford	374	25.2	+9.9
Liberal Democrats	Terry Barrett	359	24.1	+2.5
UKIP	David Macdonald	335	22.5	+7.2
Green	Eleanor Gordon	284	19.1	N/A
Turnout		~1,487	43.0	+8.5
Registered electors		3,458		
Conservative hold				
Conservative hold				

=== Little Clacton and Weeley ===
Little Clacton and Weeley (2 seats)
Party	Candidate	Votes	%	±%
Tendring First	Peter Balbirnie*	627	36.9	+5.3
Conservative	Dawn Skeels	609	35.8	+3.3
Conservative	Mick Skeels*	594	35.0	+7.9
Tendring First	Daniel Land	553	32.5	+5.7
Independent	Carol Bannister	354	20.8	N/A
Labour	Gary McNamara	183	10.8	–4.3
Labour	Natasha Lund-Colon	176	10.4	–2.6
Turnout		~1,699	45.5	+7.2
Registered electors		3,735		
Tendring First hold				
Conservative hold				

=== Manningtree, Mistley, Little Bentley and Tendring ===
Manningtree, Mistley, Little Bentley and Tendring (2 seats)
Party	Candidate	Votes	%	±%
Conservative	Carlo Guglielmi*	759	44.9	+1.4
Conservative	Sarah Candy*	724	42.8	+0.3
Liberal Democrats	Rosemary Smith*	656	38.8	–4.7
Green	Duncan Gordan	407	24.1	N/A
Liberal Democrats	James Potter	367	21.7	–15.9
Turnout		~1,690	46.4	+7.9
Registered electors		3,643		
Conservative hold				
Conservative gain from Liberal Democrats				

=== Peter Bruff ===
Peter Bruff (2 seats)
Party	Candidate	Votes	%	±%
Conservative	Gwen Mitchell	446	39.5	+7.3
Conservative	Mitch Mitchell*	427	37.8	+8.1
Liberal Democrats	Michael Harper	379	33.6	–2.9
Liberal Democrats	Susan Shearing*	335	29.7	–0.6
Labour	Bill Prosser	257	22.8	+8.7
Labour	Alan Roebuck	223	19.8	+6.9
Turnout		~1,128	34.9	+4.7
Registered electors		3,233		
Conservative hold				
Conservative gain from Liberal Democrats				

=== Pier ===
Pier (2 seats)
Party	Candidate	Votes	%	±%
Conservative	Sue Honeywood*	480	43.5	+9.2
Conservative	Paul Honeywood*	473	42.8	+10.1
Tendring First	Ann Oxley	303	27.4	+1.9
Tendring First	Ronald Stephenson	278	25.2	+2.0
Labour	Kevin Colman	270	24.4	+2.5
Labour	Keith Henderson	225	20.4	+1.3
Turnout		~1,104	32.9	+6.4
Registered electors		3,357		
Conservative hold				
Conservative hold				

=== Ramsey and Parkeston ===
Ramsey and Parkeston
Party	Candidate	Votes	%	±%
Conservative	Tony Colbourne	297	40.9	
Labour	Hugh Markham-Lee	252	34.7	
UKIP	Martyn Donn	178	24.5	
Majority				
Turnout				
Conservative gain from Community Rep.		Swing		

=== Rush Green ===
Rush Green (2 seats)
Party	Candidate	Votes	%	±%
Conservative	Danny Mayzes*	491	42.2	–18.4
Conservative	Stephen Mayzes*	467	40.2	–15.5
Labour	Linda Jacobs	374	32.2	–7.2
Labour	Jon Salisbury	344	29.6	–9.7
Liberal Democrats	Trisha Turner	121	10.4	N/A
Liberal Democrats	Richard Williams	109	9.4	N/A
BNP	Tracey Worsley	104	8.9	N/A
Turnout		~1,163	33.9	–5.7
Registered electors		3,431		
Conservative hold				
Conservative hold				

=== St Bartholomews ===
St Bartholomews (2 seats)
Party	Candidate	Votes	%	±%
Residents	Mary Bragg*	1,341	66.6	+15.0
Residents	KT King*	1,278	63.5	+15.1
Conservative	Anne Alexander	527	26.2	–18.3
Conservative	Maureen McGrath	428	21.3	–22.9
Turnout		~2,014	52.4	+6.1
Registered electors		3,843		
Residents hold				
Residents hold				

=== St James ===
St James (2 seats)
Party	Candidate	Votes	%	±%
Conservative	Chris Griffiths*	766	54.3	+1.2
Conservative	Gill Downing*	718	50.9	+1.9
Tendring First	David Rose	276	19.6	–0.9
Labour	Wendy Brown	256	18.1	+3.8
Labour	Kim Rawlins	207	14.7	N/A
Tendring First	Mike Vaughan-Chatfield	191	19.6	–0.9
Green	James Horsler	87	6.2	N/A
Liberal Democrats	John Candler	79	5.6	–6.5
Liberal Democrats	Ann Whitson	44	3.1	N/A
Turnout		~1,411	41.2	+3.8
Registered electors		3,424		
Conservative hold				
Conservative hold				

=== St Johns ===
St Johns (2 seats)
Party	Candidate	Votes	%	±%
Conservative	Peter Halliday*	633	42.3	+1.1
Conservative	Chris Amos	575	38.4	+4.1
Labour	Samantha Atkinson	474	31.7	+12.6
Labour	Eve Casey	396	26.5	N/A
Liberal Democrats	Amanda Peters	284	19.0	–20.7
Liberal Democrats	Peter Redding	228	15.2	–19.7
Green	Rosemary Dodds	117	7.8	N/A
Turnout		~1,479	39.5	+4.0
Registered electors		3,790		
Conservative hold				
Conservative gain from Liberal Democrats				

=== St Marys ===
St Marys (2 seats)
Party	Candidate	Votes	%	±%
Conservative	Tony Fawcett*	474	35.1	+2.7
Tendring First	Irene Tracey	429	31.8	N/A
Tendring First	Mark Stephenson	418	31.0	N/A
Conservative	Clive McGrath	385	28.5	–2.3
Labour	Norman Jacobs	353	26.2	–6.0
Labour	Max Morris	319	23.7	–4.1
Independent	John Hones	131	9.7	+0.2
Turnout		~1,349	36.1	+2.7
Registered electors		3,735		
Conservative hold				
Tendring First gain from Labour				

=== St Osyth and Point Clear ===
St Osyth and Point Clear (2 seats)
Party	Candidate	Votes	%	±%
Independent	Michael Talbot*	637	42.0	+3.8
Independent	John White	633	41.7	+3.6
Conservative	Jimmy Green	484	31.9	–6.3
Conservative	Tony Finnegan-Butler	394	26.0	–6.6
Labour	Tracey Osben	361	23.8	+0.2
Labour	Andrew Harrison	265	17.5	–5.7
Turnout		~1,517	43.3	+6.9
Registered electors		3,503		
Independent hold				
Independent gain from Conservative				

=== St Pauls ===
St Pauls (2 seats)
Party	Candidate	Votes	%	±%
Tendring First	Pierre Oxley*	945	55.3	–16.2
Tendring First	David Oxley*	928	54.3	–15.9
Conservative	Mick Steels	680	39.8	+11.3
Conservative	Andy Wood	618	36.2	+11.4
Turnout		~1,709	46.3	+3.8
Registered electors		3,691		
Tendring First hold				
Tendring First hold				

=== Thorrington, Frating, Elmstead and Great Bromley ===
Thorrington, Frating, Elmstead and Great Bromley (2 seats)
Party	Candidate	Votes	%	±%
Conservative	Rosemary Heaney*	974	58.2	–13.5
Conservative	Fred Nichols	838	50.1	–13.3
Liberal Democrats	Ian Caruana	610	36.5	+8.2
Liberal Democrats	Gaynor Mason	571	34.1	N/A
Turnout		~1,673	45.4	+9.8
Registered electors		3,686		
Conservative hold				
Conservative hold				

=== Walton ===
Walton (2 seats)
Party	Candidate	Votes	%	±%
Conservative	Delyth Miles	502	46.2	+12.0
Conservative	Anthony Pugh	436	40.1	+7.4
Tendring First	Jan King*	379	34.9	–22.6
Tendring First	Jack Robertson	328	30.2	–26.0
Labour	Hayley Henderson	272	25.0	N/A
Labour	Keith Henderson	255	23.5	N/A
Turnout		~1,513	45.6	+9.0
Registered electors		3,317		
Conservative gain from Tendring First				
Conservative gain from Tendring First				
