= 2027 Tendring District Council election =

2027 English local government election

- 6 May 2027

All 48 seats to Tendring District Council 25 seats needed for a majority
Leader	Mark Stephenson (Note: Leader of the Tendring Independents Group.) / Jayne Chapman (Note: Leader of The Independents Group.)	Paul Honeywood	Ivan Henderson
Party	Independent	Conservative	Labour
Leader's seat	St John's / Brightlingsea	Pier	Harwich & Kingsway
Last election	16 seats, 24.0%	19 seats, 33.0%	8 seats, 21.4%
Current seats	16	13	7
Leader	Jeff Bray	Gary Scott	Ann Oxley
Party	Reform	Liberal Democrats	Tendring First
Leader's seat	Little Clacton	Alresford & Elmstead	Walton
Last election	0 seats, 0.8%	4 seats, 12.5%	1 seat, 3.9%
Current seats	7	4	1
Incumbent Leader
Mark Stephenson
Independent
No overall control (Note: Independent–Labour–Liberal Democrats coalition.)

The 2027 Tendring District Council election will be held on 6 May 2027 to elect members of Tendring District Council in Essex, England. This will be on the same day as other local elections held across the United Kingdom.

== Background ==
=== Local government reorganisation ===
Due to proposed structural changes to local government in England, the 2023 election would have been the final election to the council before it was abolished and replaced by North East Essex Council, a unitary authority. However, on 7 September 2026, the government announced it was withdrawing plans for the planned restructuring pending review. Following this announcement, local elections due to be held in 2027 under the existing local electoral calendar would proceed.

== Summary ==
=== Election result ===
2027 Tendring District Council election
Party	Candidates	Seats	Gains	Losses	Net gain/loss	Seats %	Votes %	Votes	+/−
Independent									
Conservative									
Labour									
Reform									
Liberal Democrats									
Tendring First									
