= 2023 Tendring District Council election =

2023 UK local government election

- 4 May 2023

All 48 seats to Tendring District Council 25 seats needed for a majority
- Turnout: 29.5%
	First party	Second party	Third party
Leader	Neil Stock (retiring)	N/A	Ivan Henderson
Party	Conservative	Independent	Labour
Last election	16 seats, 33.3%	9 seats, 18.6%	6 seats, 14.3%
Seats before	21	12	6
Seats won	19	16	8
Seat change	▲3	▲5	▲2
Popular vote	18,860	13,752	12,246
Percentage	33.0%	24.0%	21.4%
Swing	▼0.2 pp	▲2.6 pp	▲7.7 pp
	Fourth party	Fifth party	Sixth party
Leader	Gary Scott	Terry Allen (defeated)
Party	Liberal Democrats	Tendring First	UKIP
Last election	2 seats, 13.1%	4 seats, 5.9%	5 seats, 5.0%
Seats before	2	4	0
Seats won	4	1	0
Seat change	▲2	▼3	▼5
Popular vote	7,142	2,231	98
Percentage	12.5%	3.9%	0.2%
Swing	▲0.2 pp	▼1.6 pp	▼4.8 pp
- Winner of each seat at the 2023 Tendring District Council election.
Leader before election
Neil Stock
Conservative
No overall control
Leader after election
Mark Thompson
Independent
No overall control

The 2023 Tendring District Council election took place on 4 May 2023 to elect all 48 members of Tendring District Council in Essex, England. This would be on the same day as other local elections across England and parish council elections in the district.

The council was under no overall control prior to the election, being led by Conservative councillor Neil Stock, who had been leader of the council since 2015. He chose not to stand for re-election.

After the election, the council remained under no overall control. A coalition of independent councillors, Labour and the Liberal Democrats formed to take control of the council. At the subsequent annual council meeting on 23 May 2023, independent councillor Mark Thompson was appointed leader of the council, Labour group leader Ivan Henderson was made deputy leader of the council, and Liberal Democrat group leader Gary Scott was made chair of the council.

== Summary ==
=== Election result ===
2023 Tendring District Council election
Party	Candidates	Seats	Gains	Losses	Net gain/loss	Seats %	Votes %	Votes	+/−
Conservative	48	19	6	3	▲3	39.6	33.0	18,860	–0.2
Independent	36	16	7	2	▲5	33.3	24.0	13,752	+2.6
Labour	48	8	2	0	▲2	16.7	21.4	12,246	+7.7
Liberal Democrats	26	4	2	0	▲2	8.3	12.5	7,142	+0.2
Tendring First	7	1	1	4	▼3	2.1	3.9	2,231	–1.6
Green	19	0	0	0	Steady	0.0	4.2	2,416	+0.4
Reform	4	0	0	0	Steady	0.0	0.8	436	N/A
UKIP	1	0	0	5	▼5	0.0	0.2	98	–4.8

== Ward results ==
The Statement of Nominated Persons, which details the candidates standing in each ward, was released following the close of nominations on 5 April 2023. The ward results were as follows:

=== Alresford and Elmstead ===
Alresford & Elmstead (2 seats)
Party	Candidate	Votes	%	±%
Liberal Democrats	Gary Scott*	1,170	63.2	+6.3
Liberal Democrats	Ann Wiggins*	1,046	56.5	+9.6
Conservative	Harriet Butcher	607	32.8	+1.5
Conservative	Mollie Ireland	466	25.2	–4.0
Labour	Louise Armstrong	231	12.5	+5.5
Labour	Olivier Mupenda	183	9.9	+2.9
Turnout			32.4	
Liberal Democrats hold				
Liberal Democrats hold				

=== Ardleigh and Little Bromley ===
Ardleigh & Little Bromley
Party	Candidate	Votes	%	±%
Conservative	Zoe Fairley	343	46.3	–5.7
Liberal Democrats	Helen Fontaine	324	43.7	+4.9
Labour	Alan Todd	74	10.0	+0.8
Turnout		749	32.1	
Conservative hold		Swing	▼5.3	

=== Bluehouse ===
Bluehouse (2 seats)
Party	Candidate	Votes	%	±%
Labour	Ian Lennard	213	24.9	+10.2
Conservative	James Codling*	212	24.7	−2.9
Independent	Bernie Goldman	195	22.8	N/A
Labour	Martin Suker	188	21.9	N/A
Conservative	Mary Newton*	185	21.6	−11.4
Independent	Danny Mayzes	129	15.1	−2.1
Independent	Bev Sencier	115	13.4	N/A
Independent	Carolyn Mayzes	107	12.5	−7.1
Independent	Josie Holland	101	11.8	N/A
UKIP	Andrew Pemberton	98	11.4	−12.7
Green	David Eisenhart-Rothe	56	6.5	N/A
Liberal Democrats	Emma Talbot	45	5.3	−2.2
Turnout		857	20.8	
Labour gain from UKIP				
Conservative gain from UKIP				

James Codling and Mary Newton were elected in 2019 as UKIP members.

=== Brightlingsea ===
Brightlingsea (3 seats)
Party	Candidate	Votes	%	±%
Independent	Mick Barry*	1,411	68.7	+13.6
Independent	Jayne Chapman*	1,309	63.7	+2.3
Independent	Graham Steady*	1,081	52.6	+10.3
Independent	Mat Court	561	27.3	N/A
Conservative	John Carr	395	19.2	+9.6
Green	Ben Harvey	264	12.8	–0.6
Labour	Jenna Barton	251	12.2	+2.9
Conservative	Nigel Dyson	217	10.6	+2.8
Labour	Margaret Saunders	188	9.1	+1.5
Conservative	Bobby McWilliams	180	8.8	+3.1
Labour	Harry Prosser	148	7.2	N/A
Liberal Democrats	James Jefferies	83	4.0	–22.5
Liberal Democrats	Stuart Morgan	76	3.7	N/A
Turnout			34.2	
Independent hold				
Independent hold				
Independent hold				

=== Burrsville ===
Burrsville (2 seats)
Party	Candidate	Votes	%	±%
Conservative	Chris Amos*	499	39.3	–1.1
Conservative	Mick Skeels*	432	34.1	–3.0
Independent	Pat Murray	290	22.9	N/A
Labour	Christopher Adams-Salmon	258	20.3	+7.5
Independent	Gareth Bayford	256	20.2	N/A
Labour	Tracey Lewis	254	20.0	N/A
Liberal Democrats	Jon Manning	183	14.4	–21.5
Liberal Democrats	Kane Silver	179	14.1	–18.9
Green	Chris Southall	131	10.3	–9.2
Independent	Jo Weiss	55	4.3	N/A
Turnout			28.1	
Conservative hold				
Conservative hold				

=== Cann Hall ===
Cann Hall (2 seats)
Party	Candidate	Votes	%	±%
Independent	Gina Placey*	425	39.5	N/A
Independent	Geeta Sudra	392	36.4	N/A
Conservative	John Chittock*	366	34.0	–8.0
Conservative	Mick Skeels	317	29.5	–3.4
Labour	Sharon Bowling	201	18.7	+4.4
Labour	Frances Wright	164	15.2	N/A
Liberal Democrats	Rob Harper	98	9.1	–14.8
Reform	Harry Shearing	97	9.0	N/A
Reform	Susan Shearing	91	8.5	N/A
Turnout			23.9	
Independent gain from Tendring First				
Independent gain from Conservative				

Gina Placey was elected in 2019 as a member of Tendring First.

=== Coppins ===
Coppins (2 seats)
Party	Candidate	Votes	%	±%
Labour	Peter Kotz	349	38.0	+18.9
Independent	Sarah Newton	294	32.0	N/A
Labour	Geoffrey Ely	292	31.8	+14.0
Conservative	Ben Smith	284	30.9	+8.6
Conservative	Alex Porter*	281	30.6	+9.6
Independent	Dale Ward	264	28.7	N/A
Liberal Democrats	Sam Manning	75	8.2	+1.8
Turnout			23.9	
Labour gain from UKIP				
Independent gain from UKIP				

Alex Porter was elected in 2019 as a member of UKIP.

=== Dovercourt All Saints ===
Dovercourt All Saints (2 seats)
Party	Candidate	Votes	%	±%
Labour	Jo Henderson*	1,018	70.8	+14.4
Labour	Maria Fowler*	858	59.6	+15.0
Conservative	Andie Erskine	423	29.4	–7.2
Conservative	Sharon Erskine	403	28.0	–5.4
Green	Duncan Gordon	175	12.2	N/A
Turnout			29.8	
Labour hold				
Labour hold				

=== Dovercourt Bay ===
Dovercourt Bay
Party	Candidate	Votes	%	±%
Labour	Garry Calver*	422	68.7	–10.1
Conservative	Lizi Ninnim	145	23.6	+2.4
Liberal Democrats	Nathan Williams	47	7.7	N/A
Majority		277	45.1	–12.5
Turnout		614	28.0	
Labour hold		Swing	▼6.3	

=== Dovercourt Tollgate ===
Dovercourt Tollgate
Party	Candidate	Votes	%	±%
Labour	Pam Morrison*	364	56.3	+2.5
Conservative	John Wade	244	37.7	–8.5
Green	Carrie Sanderson	39	6.0	N/A
Majority		120	18.6	+11.0
Turnout		647	28.3	
Labour hold		Swing	▲5.5	

=== Dovercourt Vines and Parkeston ===
Dovercourt Vines & Parkeston
Party	Candidate	Votes	%	±%
Labour	Bill Davidson*	337	66.3	+3.6
Conservative	David Chant	120	23.6	–13.7
Liberal Democrats	Simon Banks	51	10.0	N/A
Majority		217	42.7	+17.3
Turnout			24.1	
Labour hold		Swing	▲8.7	

=== Eastcliff ===
Eastcliff
Party	Candidate	Votes	%	±%
Independent	Andy Baker	468	57.8	N/A
Conservative	Percy Lomax	247	30.5	–13.5
Labour	Matthew Wistowsky	95	11.7	N/A
Majority		221	27.3	N/A
Turnout			31.8	
Independent gain from Holland Residents		Swing	N/A	

=== Frinton ===
Frinton (2 seats)
Party	Candidate	Votes	%	±%
Conservative	Nick Turner*	910	46.8	+8.2
Conservative	Richard Everett	903	46.5	+13.1
Tendring First	Terry Allen*	668	34.4	–0.3
Tendring First	Iris Johnson	496	25.5	–4.3
Labour	Nigel Roper	322	16.6	+7.8
Labour	George Taylor	318	16.4	N/A
Green	Susan Clutterbuck	268	13.8	–3.3
Turnout			40.5	
Conservative hold				
Conservative gain from Tendring First				

=== Harwich and Kingsway ===
Harwich & Kingsway
Party	Candidate	Votes	%	±%
Labour	Ivan Henderson*	493	72.9	–3.3
Conservative	Barry Brown	147	21.7	–2.1
Liberal Democrats	Wayne Linge	36	5.3	N/A
Majority		316	51.2	N/A
Turnout		676	26.2	
Labour hold		Swing	▼0.6	

=== Homelands ===
Homelands
Party	Candidate	Votes	%	±%
Conservative	Mark Platt	331	37.1	+12.3
Labour	John Carrington	161	18.0	+8.4
Independent	Shirley Heggie	122	13.7	N/A
Tendring First	Jack Robertson	120	13.4	–8.1
Liberal Democrats	Glenn Maleary	105	11.8	N/A
Green	Paul Clutterbuck	54	6.0	–0.8
Majority		170	19.1	N/A
Turnout			35.6	
Conservative gain from Independent		Swing	▲2.0	

=== Kirby Cross ===
Kirby Cross
Party	Candidate	Votes	%	±%
Conservative	Andrea Cossens	377	45.7	+16.9
Tendring First	Paul Clifton*	278	33.7	–7.7
Labour	Jay Weaver	170	20.6	+12.8
Majority		99	12.0	N/A
Turnout			28.3	
Conservative gain from Tendring First		Swing	▲12.3	

=== Kirby-le-Soken and Hamford ===
Kirby-le-Soken & Hamford
Party	Candidate	Votes	%	±%
Conservative	Mark Cossens	408	49.2	+7.4
Tendring First	Fiona Knowles*	235	28.3	–29.9
Labour	Bethan Phillips	111	13.4	N/A
Green	Paul Butler	75	9.0	N/A
Majority		173	20.9	N/A
Turnout		829	33.7	
Conservative gain from Tendring First		Swing	▲18.7	

=== Lawford, Manningtree and Mistley ===
Lawford, Manningtree & Mistley (3 seats)
Party	Candidate	Votes	%	±%
Liberal Democrats	Terry Barrett	1,208	50.6	+19.4
Conservative	Carlo Guglielmi*	907	38.0	+1.3
Liberal Democrats	Matthew Bensilum	824	34.5	+8.1
Conservative	Valerie Guglielmi*	778	32.6	+0.5
Liberal Democrats	Ken Symon	743	31.1	+8.6
Conservative	Alan Coley*	721	30.2	–3.2
Labour	Phillip Dunnett	552	23.1	–5.5
Labour	Maria Dos Santos Tavares Carreiro	425	17.8	–6.2
Green	Lucy Watts	360	15.1	–5.9
Labour	Bailey Hayes	344	14.4	–7.9
Green	David Watts	301	12.6	N/A
Turnout			35.1	
Liberal Democrats gain from Conservative				
Conservative hold				
Liberal Democrats gain from Conservative				

=== Little Clacton ===
Little Clacton
Party	Candidate	Votes	%	±%
Conservative	Jeff Bray	400	62.6	–6.0
Labour	Marian Hatch	156	24.4	N/A
Liberal Democrats	Jordan Silver	83	13.0	–18.4
Majority		244	38.2	+1.0
Turnout		639	25.9	
Conservative hold		Swing	N/A	

=== Pier ===
Pier
Party	Candidate	Votes	%	±%
Conservative	Paul Honeywood*	179	41.4	–4.8
Labour	Donny Standing	145	33.6	+14.7
Independent	James Burns	91	21.1	N/A
Liberal Democrats	Philip Cunningham	17	3.9	–3.0
Majority		34	7.8	–19.5
Turnout		432	22.1	
Conservative hold		Swing	▼9.8	

=== St Bartholomew's ===
St Bartholomew's (2 seats)
Party	Candidate	Votes	%	±%
Independent	Adrian Smith	884	59.5	N/A
Independent	Carrie Doyle	872	58.7	N/A
Conservative	Justin Ball-Greenwood	390	26.2	+0.4
Conservative	Julie Park	365	24.6	+0.5
Labour	Gerard Lovett	249	16.8	+9.6
Labour	Alison Mitchell	213	14.3	N/A
Turnout			33.1	
Independent gain from Residents				
Independent gain from Residents				

=== St James ===
St James (2 seats)
Party	Candidate	Votes	%	±%
Conservative	Chris Griffiths*	673	57.8	–11.2
Conservative	Maurice Alexander*	654	56.2	–10.2
Labour	Graham Ford	280	24.1	N/A
Labour	Sheila Hammond	271	23.3	N/A
Independent	Dan McDonnell	209	18.0	N/A
Reform	Kate Hammond	128	11.0	N/A
Liberal Democrats	Ben Minter	112	9.6	–23.0
Turnout			24.7	
Conservative hold				
Conservative hold				

=== St John's ===
St John's (2 seats)
Party	Candidate	Votes	%	±%
Independent	Mark Stephenson*	455	41.6	+1.5
Independent	Gemma Stephenson*	432	39.5	+2.6
Conservative	Sue Ball-Greenwood	345	31.5	+8.7
Conservative	Samuel Leonard	294	26.9	+8.5
Labour	Norman Jacobs	197	18.0	+6.0
Labour	David Bolton	190	17.4	+6.5
Liberal Democrats	Katherine Hornby	128	11.7	+7.8
Green	Rosemary Dodds	95	8.7	+3.7
Independent	Colin Kingham	53	4.8	N/A
Turnout			22.8	
Independent hold				
Independent hold				

=== St Osyth ===
St Osyth (2 seats)
Party	Candidate	Votes	%	±%
Independent	John White*	463	49.0	–7.4
Independent	Michael Talbot*	454	48.0	–8.8
Conservative	Stuart Mackintosh	265	28.0	–1.0
Conservative	Grace Skeels	230	24.3	–4.2
Green	Tracey Osben	148	15.7	N/A
Labour	Sandra Adams-Salmon	128	13.5	+1.8
Labour	Jane Herbert	122	12.9	N/A
Liberal Democrats	Jeremy Talbot	80	8.5	N/A
Turnout			24.2	
Independent hold				
Independent hold				

=== St Paul's ===
St Paul's
Party	Candidate	Votes	%	±%
Conservative	Sue Honeywood*	288	41.6	+5.0
Tendring First	Pierre Oxley	161	23.2	+1.4
Labour	Robert Porter	157	22.7	N/A
Green	Clive Purrett	50	7.2	–3.8
Liberal Democrats	Karen Walker	25	3.6	–5.0
Independent	Elizabeth Khan	12	1.7	N/A
Majority		127	18.4	+3.9
Turnout		693	31.0	
Conservative hold		Swing	▲1.8	

=== Stour Valley ===
Stour Valley
Party	Candidate	Votes	%	±%
Conservative	Tanya Ferguson	336	34.7	–1.5
Labour	Sean Fay	247	25.5	+11.9
Liberal Democrats	Mark De Roy	185	19.1	+8.2
Reform	Mark Cole	120	12.4	N/A
Green	Eleanor Gordon	80	8.3	–2.1
Majority		89	9.2	+1.9
Turnout		968	40.1	
Conservative hold		Swing	▼6.7	

=== The Bentleys and Frating ===
The Bentleys & Frating
Party	Candidate	Votes	%	±%
Conservative	Lynda McWilliams*	450	48.0	–6.3
Liberal Democrats	Robert Taylor	173	18.4	–8.2
Independent	Rebecca Cole	126	13.4	N/A
Labour	David Smith	102	10.9	+4.7
Green	Alison Clarke	87	9.3	–3.6
Majority		277	29.6	+1.9
Turnout			32.4	
Conservative hold		Swing	▲1.0	

=== The Oakleys and Wix ===
The Oakleys & Wix
Party	Candidate	Votes	%	±%
Independent	Mike Bush*	311	40.3	–24.4
Conservative	Tom Howard	265	34.4	+11.3
Labour	Dave McLeod	133	17.3	+5.1
Green	Bob Rowles	62	8.0	N/A
Majority		46	5.9	–35.7
Turnout			31.1	
Independent hold		Swing	▼17.9	

=== Thorpe, Beaumont and Great Holland ===
Thorpe, Beaumont & Great Holland
Party	Candidate	Votes	%	±%
Conservative	Daniel Land	789	75.8	–2.0
Labour	Diane Somers	129	12.4	N/A
Green	Jemma Keleher	77	7.4	N/A
Liberal Democrats	David Orton	46	4.4	N/A
Majority		660	63.4	+7.8
Turnout			36.1	
Conservative hold		Swing	N/A	

=== Walton ===
Walton
Party	Candidate	Votes	%	±%
Tendring First	Ann Oxley	273	33.4	+12.0
Independent	Delyth Miles*	185	22.6	–5.6
Labour	Chris Bee	171	20.9	+5.6
Conservative	Ann Poonian	140	17.1	–8.2
Green	Steven Walker	49	6.0	N/A
Majority		88	10.8	N/A
Turnout			30.1	
Tendring First gain from Independent		Swing	▲8.8	

=== Weeley and Tendring ===
Weeley & Tendring
Party	Candidate	Votes	%	±%
Conservative	Peter Harris*	453	58.8	+24.8
Independent	Vicky Cauvain	192	24.9	N/A
Labour	Dave Chable	80	10.4	N/A
Green	Natasha Osben	45	5.8	N/A
Majority		261	33.9	N/A
Turnout			31.3	
Conservative gain from Foundation		Swing	N/A	

Peter Harris was elected in 2019 as a Foundation Party member.

=== West Clacton and Jaywick Sands ===
West Clacton & Jaywick Sands (2 seats)
Party	Candidate	Votes	%	±%
Independent	Dan Casey*	602	54.1	+0.4
Independent	Brad Thompson	537	48.2	N/A
Conservative	David Booth	264	24.1	–0.4
Conservative	Anne Alexander	232	20.8	+0.3
Independent	Tony Mack	162	14.6	N/A
Labour	Michael Cattrell	154	13.8	+4.4
Labour	Adam Hewitt	138	12.4	+3.2
Independent	Danell Dreelan	137	12.3	N/A
Turnout			27.9	
Independent hold				
Independent gain from UKIP				

== Changes 2023–2027 ==
- Nick Turner (Frinton), elected as a Conservative in May 2023, had moved to independent by September 2023.
- Jeff Bray (Little Clacton) and Peter Harris (Weeley & Tendring), both elected as Conservatives, left the party in November 2023 to sit as independents.
- Richard Everett (Frinton), elected as a Conservative in 2023, left the party in February 2024 to sit as an independent.
- Richard Everett subsequently joined the Tendring Residents' Alliance political group after leaving the Conservative group.
- Dan Casey initially joined the Tendring Independents group after the election, but then gave notice that he no longer wished to be treated as a member of that group and remained ungrouped.
- James Codling (Bluehouse), elected as a Conservative, left the party on 11 June 2024 to sit as an independent.
- On 24 June 2024, independent councillors Nick Turner (Frinton), Richard Everett (Frinton), Jeff Bray (Little Clacton) and James Codling (Bluehouse) joined Reform UK, giving the party its first representation on the council.
- Nick Turner (Frinton) died in 2025, triggering the Frinton by-election.
- Mark Stephenson, leader of the Tendring Independents group, left the group in January 2025 and became an ungrouped independent.
- Michael Bush left the Tendring Independents group in December 2024 and became ungrouped.
- Following her election in June 2025, Anne Davis joined the Reform UK political group.
- Richard Everett left the Reform UK political group in August 2025 and became ungrouped.

=== By-elections ===
Bluehouse by-election, 11 January 2024
Party	Candidate	Votes	%	±%
Independent	Bernard Goldman	181	30.4	+12.1
Conservative	Alex Porter	91	15.3	–14.7
Labour	John Carrington	83	13.9	–16.2
Reform	Tony Mack	54	9.1	N/A
Independent	Danny Mayzes	52	8.7	N/A
Independent	Gareth Bayford	45	7.6	N/A
UKIP	Andrew Pemberton	38	6.4	–7.5
Independent	Josie Holland	24	4.0	N/A
Liberal Democrats	Kane Silver	22	3.7	N/A
Independent	John Chittock	6	1.0	N/A
Majority		90	15.1	N/A
Turnout		597	14.6	
Registered electors		4,083		
Independent gain from Labour		Swing	▲13.4	

By-election triggered by the resignation of Labour councillor Ian Lennard.

The Bentleys and Frating by-election: 6 February 2025
Party	Candidate	Votes	%	±%
Reform	Aimee Keteca	432	45.3	N/A
Liberal Democrats	Rachael Richards	328	34.4	+16.0
Conservative	Neil Stock	163	17.1	–30.9
Labour	Oli Mupenda	31	3.2	–7.7
Majority		104	10.9	
Turnout		954	30.8	
Registered electors		3,093		
Reform gain from Conservative				

By-election triggered by the resignation of long-serving councillor Lynda McWilliams.

Frinton by-election: 5 June 2025
Party	Candidate	Votes	%	±%
Reform	Anne Davis	1,222	57.2	N/A
Conservative	Vanda Watling	577	27.0	–15.0
Labour	Karen Creavin	168	7.9	–7.0
Green	Steven Walker	93	4.3	–8.1
Liberal Democrats	Helen Fontaine	78	3.6	N/A
Majority		645	30.2	N/A
Turnout		2,145	42.2	+1.7
Registered electors		5,086		
Reform gain from Conservative				

By-election triggered by the death of councillor Nick Turner.
