= 2019 Folkestone and Hythe District Council election =

2019 UK local government election

- 2 May 2019

All 30 seats to Folkestone & Hythe District Council 16 seats needed for a majority
- Turnout: 33.5%

	First party	Second party	Third party
Party	Conservative	Green	Labour
Last election	22 seats, 37.9%	0 seats, 12.8%	1 seat, 11.6%
Seats before	22	0	1
Seats won	13	6	6
Seat change	▼9	▲6	▲5
Popular vote	22,072	15,268	11,422
Percentage	36.4%	25.2%	18.8%
Swing	▼1.5%	▲12.4%	▲7.2%
	Fourth party	Fifth party	Sixth party
Party	Liberal Democrats	UKIP	Independent
Last election	0 seats, 10.3%	7 seats, 19.6%	0 seats, 5.6%
Seats before	0	7	0
Seats won	2	2	1
Seat change	▲2	▼5	▲1
Popular vote	6,821	2,162	2,423
Percentage	11.3%	3.6%	4.0%
Swing	▲1.0%	▼16.0%	▼1.6%
- Winner of each seat at the 2019 Folkestone and the Hythe District Council election
Council control before election
David Monk
Conservative
Council control after election
David Monk
No overall control

Elections to Folkestone & Hythe District Council were held on 2 May 2019.

== Summary ==
=== Election result ===
2019 Folkestone and Hythe District Council election
Party	Candidates	Seats	Gains	Losses	Net gain/loss	Seats %	Votes %	Votes	+/−
Conservative	30	13	1	10	▼9	43.3	36.4	22,072	–1.5
Green	15	6	6	0	▲6	20.0	25.2	15,268	+12.4
Labour	30	6	5	0	▲5	20.0	18.8	11,422	+7.2
Liberal Democrats	15	2	2	0	▲2	6.7	11.3	6,821	+1.0
UKIP	3	2	1	6	▼5	6.7	3.6	2,162	–16.0
Independent	5	1	1	0	▲1	3.3	4.0	2,423	–1.6
Foundation	1	0	0	0	Steady	0.0	0.6	384	N/A
Socialist (GB)	1	0	0	0	Steady	0.0	0.1	59	N/A

== Ward results ==
=== Broadmead ===
Broadmead
Party	Candidate	Votes	%	±%
Conservative	Ann Berry*	582	57.0	+11.7
Labour	John O'Hara	220	21.5	+8.6
Liberal Democrats	Harrison Scott-Sansom	178	17.4	−5.0
Majority		362	35.5	
Turnout		1,021	32.3	
Registered electors		3,157		
Rejected ballots		41	4.0	
Conservative hold		Swing		

=== Cheriton ===
Cheriton
Party	Candidate	Votes	%	±%
Conservative	Peter Gane*	854	34.4	+5.8
Green	Rebecca Shoob	846	34.0	+23.5
Conservative	John Collier*	793	31.9	+5.4
Conservative	Roger West	781	31.4	+10.5
Labour	Paul Bingham	662	26.6	+8.2
Labour	Jonathan Graham	655	26.3	+12.6
Labour	Laura Sullivan	579	23.3	+11.7
Liberal Democrats	Martin Berridge	532	21.4	+2.9
Liberal Democrats	Ross Clark	445	17.9	N/A
Turnout		2,486	26.8	
Registered electors		9,275		
Rejected ballots		81	3.3	
Conservative hold				
Green gain from UKIP				
Conservative hold				

=== East Folkestone ===
East Folkestone
Party	Candidate	Votes	%	±%
Labour	Michelle Dorrell	639	32.5	+6.6
Labour	Jackie Meade	623	31.7	+11.0
Labour	Connor Mcconville	558	28.4	+8.9
Conservative	Dylan Jeffrey	546	27.7	+6.5
Green	Jennifer Hawkins	503	25.6	N/A
Conservative	Dave Pascoe	502	25.5	+4.8
Green	Clive Hawkins	448	22.8	N/A
Conservative	Neil Jones	395	20.1	+1.3
Liberal Democrats	Hugh Robertson-Ritchie	368	18.7	+10.0
Independent	Carol Sacre*	319	16.2	N/A
Turnout		1,968	23.1	
Registered electors		8,535		
Rejected ballots		46	2.3	
Labour gain from UKIP				
Labour gain from UKIP				
Labour hold				

Dylan Jeffrey stood as a Labour candidate in 2015, and Carol Sacre stood as a UKIP candidate.

=== Folkestone Central ===
Folkestone Central
Party	Candidate	Votes	%	±%
Labour	Laura Davison	742	32.5	+14.8
Conservative	Dan Brook	726	31.8	+4.6
Conservative	David Monk*	675	29.5	+4.4
Labour	David Horton	656	28.7	+11.6
Labour	Belinda Walker	640	28.0	N/A
Conservative	Dick Pascoe*	635	27.8	+2.7
Liberal Democrats	Sally Matthews	481	21.1	+9.3
Liberal Democrats	Tom McNeice	473	20.7	+9.7
Liberal Democrats	Oliver Robinson	422	18.5	+8.4
Independent	Bryan Rylands	357	15.6	N/A
Turnout		2,285	27.9	
Registered electors		8,202		
Rejected ballots		64	2.8	
Labour gain from Conservative		Swing	▲5.1	
Conservative hold				
Conservative hold				

David Horton stood as a Green candidate in 2015.

=== Folkestone Harbour ===
Folkestone Harbour
Party	Candidate	Votes	%	±%
Labour	Nicola Keen	402	28.5	+7.3
Labour	Ray Field	395	28.0	+7.3
Foundation	Mary Lawes*	384	27.2	N/A
Green	Sandy McConnell	334	23.7	N/A
Conservative	Sue Wallace*	286	20.3	−8.9
Conservative	Dhan Gurung	259	18.4	−8.5
Liberal Democrats	Danielle Anson	253	17.9	+5.8
Socialist (GB)	Andy Thomas	59	4.2	N/A
Turnout		1,411	28.0	
Registered electors		5,039		
Rejected ballots		32	2.3	
Labour gain from UKIP				
Labour gain from Conservative		Swing	▲8.1	

Ray Field stood as a TUSC candidate in 2015, and Mary Lawes stood as a UKIP candidate.

=== Hythe ===
Hythe
Party	Candidate	Votes	%	±%
Green	Jim Martin	2,656	61.0	+26.8
Green	Lesley Whybrow	2,648	60.8	+28.3
Green	Georgina Treloar	2,408	55.3	+23.6
Conservative	Malcolm Dearden*	1,197	27.5	−22.1
Conservative	Alan Ewart-James*	1,150	26.4	−21.2
Conservative	David Owen*	1,136	26.1	−19.6
Labour	Christopher Deane	293	6.7	N/A
Labour	Lynne Smith	265	6.1	N/A
Labour	Gary Snow	222	5.1	N/A
Turnout		4,356	46.5	
Registered electors		9,369		
Rejected ballots		82	1.9	
Green gain from Conservative		Swing	▲24.5	
Green gain from Conservative		Swing	▲24.5	
Green gain from Conservative		Swing	▲24.5	

=== Hythe Rural ===
Hythe Rural
Party	Candidate	Votes	%	±%
Green	Douglas Wade	978	51.5	+25.6
Green	John Wing	861	45.4	N/A
Conservative	Paul Peacock*	545	28.7	−15.1
Conservative	Michael Lyons*	508	26.8	−13.5
Independent	Harry Williams	262	13.8	−16.6
Labour	Nicola Deane	174	9.2	N/A
Labour	Tony Goode	131	6.9	N/A
Turnout		1,898	38.1	
Registered electors		4,988		
Rejected ballots		34	1.8	
Green gain from Conservative		Swing	▲20.4	
Green gain from Conservative		Swing	▲20.4	

=== New Romney ===
New Romney
Party	Candidate	Votes	%	±%
Independent	David Wimble	1,032	48.0	+31.7
Conservative	Patricia Rolfe	624	29.0	±0.0
Conservative	Russell Tillson	583	27.1	±0.0
Labour	John Cramp	467	21.7	+10.7
Green	Malcolm Watkinson	431	20.0	+13.4
Liberal Democrats	Val Loseby	258	12.0	+3.5
Labour	Janet Paice	178	8.3	N/A
Turnout		2,152	36.6	
Registered electors		5,886		
Rejected ballots		32	1.5	
Independent gain from UKIP				
Conservative hold				

=== North Downs East ===
North Downs East
Party	Candidate	Votes	%	±%
Conservative	David Godfrey*	1,274	48.6	+7.4
Conservative	Stuart Peall*	1,213	46.2	+6.5
Conservative	Philip Martin*	1,181	45.0	+11.2
Green	Stephen Scoffham	797	30.4	+18.9
Green	David Williams	658	25.1	+15.4
Liberal Democrats	Cyril Trice	546	20.8	+9.3
Labour	Andy Csiszar	333	12.7	+1.3
Labour	Peter McLaren	329	12.5	+1.2
Labour	Joe Yusuf	250	9.5	N/A
Turnout		2,624	29.3	
Registered electors		8,949		
Rejected ballots		78	3.0	
Conservative hold				
Conservative hold				
Conservative hold				

=== North Downs West ===
North Downs West
Party	Candidate	Votes	%	±%
Conservative	Susan Carey*	945	41.6	−15.4
Conservative	Jennifer Hollingsbee*	847	37.3	−13.6
Green	Susan Chivers	756	33.3	+11.1
UKIP	Liz Phillips	501	22.0	N/A
Liberal Democrats	Neil Matthews	474	20.9	+0.1
Labour	Sophia Moffatt-White	262	11.5	N/A
Labour	Sophie Mort	226	9.9	N/A
Turnout		2,273	44.4	
Registered electors		5,117		
Rejected ballots		19	0.8	
Conservative hold		Swing		
Conservative hold		Swing		

=== Sandgate and West Folkestone ===
Sandgate & West Folkestone
Party	Candidate	Votes	%	±%
Liberal Democrats	Tim Prater	962	54.8	+41.0
Liberal Democrats	Gary Fuller	844	48.1	+34.5
Conservative	Rory Love*	487	27.8	−18.9
Conservative	Jan Holben*	471	26.9	−8.4
Labour	Verity Sandles	244	13.9	+2.3
Labour	Abena Akuffo-Kelly	204	11.6	+1.3
Turnout		1,754	39.0	
Registered electors		4,502		
Rejected ballots		46	2.6	
Liberal Democrats gain from Conservative		Swing	▲29.9	
Liberal Democrats gain from Conservative		Swing	▲29.9	

=== Romney Marsh ===
Romney Marsh
Party	Candidate	Votes	%	±%
UKIP	Ian Meyers	851	34.9	−1.9
UKIP	Terry Mullard	810	33.3	−0.4
Conservative	Roger Wilkins*	630	25.9	−10.0
Conservative	Eddie Goddard	553	22.7	−10.3
Green	Penny Graham	552	22.7	N/A
Labour	Chrissie Cooper	309	12.7	−1.1
Labour	Tony Cooper	285	11.7	+0.5
Liberal Democrats	Michel La Rue	272	11.2	+5.4
Turnout		2,436	39.8	
Registered electors		6,121		
Rejected ballots		38	1.6	
UKIP hold				
UKIP gain from Conservative		Swing	▲4.0	

=== Walland and Denge Marsh ===
Walland & Denge Marsh
Party	Candidate	Votes	%	±%
Conservative	Clive Goddard*	858	44.2	+3.7
Conservative	Tony Hills	836	43.1	+10.9
Independent	Len Laws*	453	23.3	N/A
Green	Ross Carter	392	20.2	+12.0
Liberal Democrats	Ted Last	313	16.1	+8.8
Labour	Paul Carey	248	12.8	+2.0
Labour	John Davies	231	11.9	+2.4
Turnout		1,941	31.0	
Registered electors		6,261		
Rejected ballots		44	2.3	
Conservative hold		Swing		
Conservative gain from UKIP		Swing		

== Changes 2019–2023 ==
No by-elections were held on Folkestone and Hythe District Council between the 2019 and 2023 ordinary elections. Several councillors changed party affiliation during the term:

- Labour councillor Ray Field (Folkestone Harbour) was suspended from the Labour Party and removed from the local Labour group in February 2020 after joining Conservative leader David Monk's power-sharing cabinet; he continued to sit as an independent.
- Conservative councillor Peter Gane (Cheriton) joined the Liberal Democrats in June 2022, having been deselected as a Conservative candidate after repeatedly voting against the party line.
- Conservative councillor Philip Martin (North Downs East) left the party and stood for re-election in 2023 as an independent, a move outgoing council leader David Monk blamed in part for the Conservatives' losses in that ward.
