= 2019 Tendring District Council election =

2019 UK local government election

- 2 May 2019

All 48 seats to Tendring District Council 25 seats needed for a majority
- Turnout: 31.8%

	First party	Second party	Third party
Party	Conservative	Independent	Labour
Last election	23 seats, 37.4%	6 seats, 9.8%	4 seats, 16.8%
Seats won	16	11	6
Seat change	▼7	▲5	▲2
Popular vote	19,110	11,916	8,031
Percentage	32.8%	20.5%	13.8%
Swing	▼4.6%	▲10.7%	▼3.0%
	Fourth party	Fifth party	Sixth party
Party	UKIP	Tendring First	Holland Residents
Last election	22 seats, 23.3%	1 seat, 7.1%	3 seats, 4.2%
Seats won	5	4	3
Seat change	▼17	▲3	Steady
Popular vote	2,868	3,378	2,615
Percentage	4.9%	5.8%	4.5%
Swing	▼18.4%	▼1.3%	▲0.3%
	Seventh party	Eighth party
Party	Liberal Democrats	Foundation
Last election	1 seat, 1.7%	N/A
Seats won	2	1
Seat change	▲1	▲1
Popular vote	7,721	353
Percentage	13.3%	0.6%
Swing	▲11.6%	N/A
- Winner of each seat at the 2019 Tendring District Council election
Council control before election
No overall control
Council control after election
No overall control

The 2019 Tendring District Council election took place on 2 May 2019 to elect members of Tendring District Council in England. This was on the same day as other local elections. The overall turnout was 31.8%.

Following the 2015 election the size of the council was reduced from 60 seats to 48 seats with ward boundaries being redrawn accordingly. These changes took effect from this election.

== Summary ==
=== Election result ===
2019 Tendring District Council election
Party	Candidates	Seats	Gains	Losses	Net gain/loss	Seats %	Votes %	Votes	+/−
Conservative	48	16	3	1	▼7	33.3	32.8	19,110	–4.6
Independent	24	11	2	0	▲5	22.9	20.5	11,916	+10.7
Labour	33	6	0	0	▲2	12.5	13.8	8,031	–3.0
UKIP	9	5	0	5	▼17	10.4	4.9	2,868	–18.4
Tendring First	9	4	1	0	▲3	8.3	5.8	3,378	–1.3
Holland-on-Sea Residents' Association	3	3	0	0	Steady	6.3	4.5	2,615	+0.3
Liberal Democrats	25	2	0	0	▲1	4.2	13.3	7,721	+11.6
Foundation	1	1	0	0	▲1	2.1	0.6	353	N/A
Green	12	0	0	0	Steady	0.0	3.8	2,240	+2.2

== Ward results ==
=== Alresford & Elmstead ===
Alresford & Elmstead
Party	Candidate	Votes	%
Liberal Democrats	Gary Scott	1,072	56.9
Liberal Democrats	Ann Wiggins	884	46.9
Conservative	Rosemary Heaney	589	31.3
Conservative	Fred Nicholls	550	29.2
Green	Beverley Maltby	201	10.7
Labour	Solma Ahmed	132	7.0
Labour	Terry Ripo	131	7.0
Majority		295	15.7
Turnout		1,908	
Liberal Democrats win (new seat)			
Liberal Democrats win (new seat)			
Rejected ballots		25	

=== Ardleigh & Little Bromley ===
Ardleigh & Little Bromley
Party	Candidate	Votes	%
Conservative	Neil Stock	335	52.0
Liberal Democrats	Helen Fontaine	250	38.8
Labour	Jim English	59	9.2
Majority		85	{{{percentage}}}
Turnout		644	
Conservative win (new seat)			
Rejected ballots		16	

=== Bluehouse ===
Bluehouse
Party	Candidate	Votes	%
UKIP	Mary Newton	316	33.0
UKIP	James Codling	264	27.6
Independent	Andrew Pemberton	231	24.1
Conservative	Harry Bouchard	199	20.8
Independent	Carolyn Mayzes	188	19.6
Conservative	James Bouchard	181	18.9
Independent	Danny Mayzes	165	17.2
Labour	Jon Salisbury	141	14.7
Liberal Democrats	Barrie Coker	72	7.5
Majority		33	3.4
Turnout		960	
UKIP win (new seat)			
UKIP win (new seat)			
Rejected ballots		3	

=== Brightlingsea ===
Brightlingsea
Party	Candidate	Votes	%
Independent	Jayne Chapman	1,607	61.4
Independent	Mick Barry	1,442	55.1
Independent	Graham Steady	1,106	42.3
Independent	Karen Yallop	736	28.1
Liberal Democrats	Mike Beckett	693	26.5
Independent	Ben Smith	397	15.2
Green	Craig Whipps	350	13.4
Conservative	John Carr	252	9.6
Labour	Frederick Stringer	243	9.3
Conservative	Graham Chasney	204	7.8
Labour	Graham Ford	200	7.6
Conservative	Izzy Morath	148	5.7
Majority		370	14.1
Turnout		2,625	
Independent hold			
Independent hold			
Independent hold			
Rejected ballots		8	

=== Burrsville ===
Burrsville
Party	Candidate	Votes	%
Conservative	Chris Amos	529	40.4
Conservative	Mick Skeels	487	37.1
Liberal Democrats	Keith Pitkin	471	35.9
Liberal Democrats	Matthew Bensilum	432	33.0
Green	Chris Southall	255	19.5
Labour	Lesley Hartfield	168	12.8
Majority		16	1.2
Turnout		1,343	
Conservative gain from UKIP			
Conservative win (new seat)			
Rejected ballots		32	

=== Cann Hall ===
Cann Hall
Party	Candidate	Votes	%
Conservative	John Chittock	478	42.0
Tendring First	Gina Placey	453	39.8
Conservative	Ian Whitley	374	32.9
Liberal Democrats	Andy Wood	272	23.9
Liberal Democrats	Stuart Morgan	186	16.3
Labour	Simon Wigley	163	14.3
Majority		79	6.9
Turnout		1,155	
Conservative win (new seat)			
Tendring First win (new seat)			
Rejected ballots		17	

=== Coppins ===
Coppins
Party	Candidate	Votes	%
UKIP	Peter Cawthron	461	37.4
UKIP	Alex Porter	448	36.4
Conservative	Stuart Mackintosh	275	22.3
Conservative	Beverley Moule	258	21.0
Labour	Jonathan Cowan	235	19.1
Labour	Rita Griffin	219	17.8
Independent	Samantha Atkinson	201	16.3
Independent	James Burns	171	13.9
Liberal Democrats	Kriss Wood	79	6.4
Liberal Democrats	Jon Manning	62	5.0
Majority		173	14.1
Turnout		1,235	
UKIP win (new seat)			
UKIP win (new seat)			
Rejected ballots		4	

=== Dovercourt All Saints ===
Dovercourt All Saints
Party	Candidate	Votes	%
Labour	Jo Henderson	779	56.4
Labour	Maria Fowler	616	44.6
Conservative	Andrew Erskine	506	36.6
Conservative	Tanya Ferguson	461	33.4
Liberal Democrats	David Dixon	163	11.8
Majority		110	8.0
Turnout		1,444	
Labour win (new seat)			
Labour win (new seat)			
Rejected ballots		63	

=== Dovercourt Bay ===
Dovercourt Bay
Party	Candidate	Votes	%
Labour	Garry Calver	479	78.8
Conservative	Barry Brown	129	21.2
Majority		350	57.6
Turnout		608	
Labour win (new seat)			
Rejected ballots		28	

=== Dovercourt Tollgate ===
Dovercourt Tollgate
Party	Candidate	Votes	%
Labour	Pam Morrison	316	53.8
Conservative	Rick Callender	271	46.2
Majority		45	{{{percentage}}}
Turnout		587	
Labour win (new seat)			
Rejected ballots		20	

=== Dovercourt Vines & Parkeston ===
Dovercourt Vines & Parkeston
Party	Candidate	Votes	%
Labour	Bill Davidson	319	62.7
Conservative	Sean Fay	190	37.3
Majority		129	{{{percentage}}}
Turnout		509	
Labour win (new seat)			
Rejected ballots		20	

=== Eastcliff ===
Eastcliff
Party	Candidate	Votes	%
Holland Residents	Joy Broderick	409	51.1
Conservative	David Rose	352	44.0
Liberal Democrats	Antony McKay	39	4.9
Majority		57	{{{percentage}}}
Turnout		800	
Holland Residents win (new seat)			
Rejected ballots		14	

=== Frinton ===
Frinton
Party	Candidate	Votes	%
Conservative	Nick Turner	808	38.6
Tendring First	Terry Allen	726	34.7
Conservative	Pamela Walford	699	33.4
Tendring First	Linda Allen	624	29.8
Green	Andy Wilson	358	17.1
Independent	Ian Johnson	328	15.7
Labour	Nadine Edwards	184	8.8
Liberal Democrats	Sam Manning	139	6.6
Majority		27	1.3
Turnout		2,116	
Conservative hold			
Tendring First gain from Conservative			
Rejected ballots		25	

=== Harwich and Kingsway ===
Harwich and Kingsway
Party	Candidate	Votes	%
Labour	Ivan Henderson	519	76.2
Conservative	Darrell Howard	162	23.8
Majority		357	{{{percentage}}}
Turnout		681	
Labour win (new seat)			
Rejected ballots		28	

=== Homelands ===
Homelands
Party	Candidate	Votes	%
Independent	Anne Davis	231	25.8
Conservative	Mick Page	222	24.8
Tendring First	Fiona Robertson	193	21.5
Independent	Laurence Gray	103	11.5
Labour	Geoff Ely	86	9.6
Green	Paul Clutterbuck	61	6.8
Majority		9	1.0
Turnout		896	
Independent gain from UKIP			
Rejected ballots		17	

=== Kirby Cross ===
Kirby Cross
Party	Candidate	Votes	%
Tendring First	Paul Clifton	312	41.4
Conservative	Edward Bell	217	28.8
UKIP	Christine Codling	165	21.9
Labour	Dave Jones	59	7.8
Majority		95	{{{percentage}}}
Turnout		753	
Tendring First win (new seat)			
Rejected ballots		6	

=== Kirby-le-Soken & Hamford ===
Kirby-le-Soken & Hamford
Party	Candidate	Votes	%
Tendring First	Fiona Knowles	506	58.2
Conservative	Mark Platt	363	41.8
Majority		143	{{{percentage}}}
Turnout			
Tendring First win (new seat)			
Rejected ballots		20	

=== Lawford, Manningtree & Mistley ===
Lawford, Manningtree & Mistley
Party	Candidate	Votes	%
Conservative	Carlo Guglielmi	806	36.7
Conservative	Alan Coley	733	33.4
Conservative	Val Guglielmi	706	32.1
Liberal Democrats	Terry Barrett	685	31.2
Labour	Holly Turner	629	28.6
Liberal Democrats	Graham Pettit	579	26.4
Labour	Patricia Chandler	527	24.0
Liberal Democrats	Simon Banks	494	22.5
Labour	Margaret Woods	490	22.3
Green	Duncan Gordon	461	21.0
Majority		21	1.0
Turnout		2,219	
Conservative win (new seat)			
Conservative win (new seat)			
Conservative win (new seat)			
Rejected ballots		23	

=== Little Clacton ===
Little Clacton
Party	Candidate	Votes	%
Conservative	Jeff Bray	404	68.6
Liberal Democrats	Jordan Silver	185	31.4
Majority		219	{{{percentage}}}
Turnout		589	
Conservative win (new seat)			
Rejected ballots		31	

=== Pier ===
Pier
Party	Candidate	Votes	%
Conservative	Paul Honeywood	228	46.2
Labour	Susan Morley-Souter	93	18.9
Independent	William Hones	90	18.3
Green	Steven Kelly	48	9.7
Liberal Democrats	Paul Barker	34	6.9
Majority		135	{{{percentage}}}
Turnout		493	
Conservative hold			
Rejected ballots		11	

=== St. Bartholomew's ===
St. Bartholomew's
Party	Candidate	Votes	%
Holland Residents	Colin Winfield	1,171	67.1
Holland Residents	K T King	1,035	59.3
Conservative	Mark Cossens	450	25.8
Conservative	Samuel Leonard	420	24.1
Green	Sally McAteer	163	9.3
Labour	Sheila Hammond	126	7.2
Majority		585	33.5
Turnout		1,753	
Holland Residents hold			
Holland Residents hold			
Rejected ballots		9	

=== St. James ===
St. James
Party	Candidate	Votes	%
Conservative	Chris Griffiths	837	69.0
Conservative	Maurice Alexander	806	66.4
Liberal Democrats	Sean Duffy	395	32.6
Majority		411	33.9
Turnout		1,294	
Conservative gain from UKIP			
Conservative hold			
Rejected ballots		81	

=== St. John's ===
St. John's
Party	Candidate	Votes	%
Independent	Mark Stephenson	545	40.1
Independent	Gemma Stephenson	502	36.9
UKIP	John Hones	336	24.7
Conservative	Anne Alexander	310	22.8
UKIP	Colin Madge	281	20.7
Conservative	Richard Everett	250	18.4
Labour	Norman Jacobs	163	12.0
Labour	David Bolton	148	10.9
Green	Rosemary Dodds	69	5.0
Liberal Democrats	Kane Silver	53	3.9
Majority		166	12.2
Turnout		1,370	
Independent win (new seat)			
Independent win (new seat)			
Rejected ballots		11	

=== St. Osyth's ===
Due to the death of a candidate, the election for St. Osyth's ward was delayed to 23 May 2019.

St. Osyth's
Party	Candidate	Votes	%
Independent	Michael Talbot	856	56.8
Independent	John White	850	56.4
Conservative	Dawn Skeels	437	29.0
Conservative	Mick Skeels	430	28.5
Labour	Tracey Osben	177	11.7
Turnout		1,565	40.0
Independent win (new seat)			
Independent win (new seat)			
Rejected ballots		58	

=== St. Paul's ===
St. Paul's
Party	Candidate	Votes	%
Conservative	Sue Honeywood	265	36.6
UKIP	Mike Vaughn-Chatfield	160	22.1
Tendring First	David Oxley	158	21.8
Green	Clive Purrett	80	11.0
Liberal Democrats	Mary Pitkin	62	8.6
Majority		105	14.5
Turnout		725	
Conservative gain from UKIP			
Rejected ballots		7	

=== Stour Valley ===
Stour Valley
Party	Candidate	Votes	%
Conservative	Zoe Fairley	320	36.2
Independent	Mark Cole	255	28.9
Labour	Dave McLeod	120	13.6
Liberal Democrats	Rosemary Smith	96	10.9
Green	Eleanor Gordon	92	10.4
Majority		65	{{{percentage}}}
Turnout		883	
Conservative win (new seat)			
Rejected ballots		8	

=== The Bentleys & Frating ===
The Bentleys & Frating
Party	Candidate	Votes	%
Conservative	Lynda McWilliams	430	54.3
Liberal Democrats	Robert Taylor	211	26.6
Green	Alison Clarke	102	12.9
Labour	Louise Armstrong	49	6.2
Majority		219	{{{percentage}}}
Turnout		792	
Conservative win (new seat)			
Rejected ballots		10	

=== The Oakleys & Wix ===
The Oakleys & Wix
Party	Candidate	Votes	%
Independent	Mike Bush	513	64.7
Conservative	David Chant	183	23.1
Labour	John McAllister	97	12.2
Majority		330	{{{percentage}}}
Turnout		793	
Independent win (new seat)			
Rejected ballots		9	

=== Thorpe, Beaumont & Great Holland ===
Thorpe, Beaumont & Great Holland
Party	Candidate	Votes	%
Conservative	Daniel Land	832	77.8
Tendring First	Chris Keston	237	22.2
Majority		595	{{{percentage}}}
Turnout		1,069	
Conservative win (new seat)			
Rejected ballots		22	

=== Walton ===
Walton
Party	Candidate	Votes	%
Independent	Delyth Miles	224	28.4
Conservative	Ann Poonian	200	25.3
Tendring First	Jack Robertson	169	21.4
Labour	Nic El-Safty	121	15.3
Independent	Chris Bee	76	9.6
Majority		24	3.0
Turnout		790	
Independent gain from UKIP			
Rejected ballots		18	

=== Weeley and Tendring ===
Weeley and Tendring
Party	Candidate	Votes	%
Foundation	Peter Harris	353	50.0
Conservative	Mike Brown	240	34.0
Liberal Democrats	Jill Galloway	113	16.0
Majority		113	{{{percentage}}}
Turnout		706	
Foundation win (new seat)			
Rejected ballots		6	

=== West Clacton & Jaywick Sands ===
West Clacton & Jaywick Sands
Party	Candidate	Votes	%
Independent	Dan Casey	703	53.7
UKIP	Nicola Overton	437	33.4
Independent	Andy White	396	30.2
Conservative	Kevin Watson	316	24.1
Conservative	Roy Raby	268	20.5
Labour	James Machin	123	9.4
Labour	Tasha Osben	120	9.2
Majority		41	3.1
Turnout		1,318	
Independent win (new seat)			
UKIP win (new seat)			
Rejected ballots		8	

== Changes 2019–2023 ==
The two councillors elected for St Osyth on 23 May 2019, Michael Talbot and John White, subsequently joined the Independent Group. Peter Cawthron, elected for Coppins, joined the UKIP Group on 28 May 2019.

=== Eastcliff ===
Eastcliff: 6 May 2021
Party	Candidate	Votes	%	±%
Independent	Andrew Phillip Hartnell Baker	414	45.9	N/A
Conservative	Michael John Daniel Skeels	294	32.6	−11.4
Holland Residents	Eric William Speller	118	13.1	−38.0
Labour	Simon Jonathan Wigley	44	4.9	N/A
Independent	Daniel Richard Mayzes	18	2.0	N/A
Liberal Democrats	Mary Pitkin	13	1.4	−3.5
Majority		120	13.3	
Turnout		901		
Independent gain from Holland Residents		Swing	▲26.7	

=== West Clacton and Jaywick Sands ===
West Clacton and Jaywick Sands: 6 May 2021
Party	Candidate	Votes	%	±%
Conservative	Jayne Belinda Nash	500	41.7	+21.7
Independent	Bradley Patrick Thompson	395	33.0	N/A
Tendring First	Andrew Paul White	140	11.7	N/A
Labour	James Edward Machin	110	9.2	−0.2
Independent	Andrew Ian Wood	32	2.7	N/A
Liberal Democrats	Stuart David Morgan	21	1.8	N/A
Majority		105	8.8	
Turnout		1,198		
Conservative gain from UKIP		Swing	▼5.7	

Following the Eastcliff by-election, Andrew Phillip Hartnell Baker notified the council that he wished to be treated as a member of the Tendring Independents political group. Following the West Clacton and Jaywick Sands by-election, Jayne Belinda Nash notified the council that she wished to be treated as a member of the Conservative political group.
