= 2007 Tendring District Council election =

English local election

- 5 May 2007

All 60 seats to Tendring District Council 31 seats needed for a majority

| | First party | Second party | Third party |
|---|---|---|---|
| Party | Conservative | Tendring First | Labour |
| Last election | 25 seats, 36.0% | N/A | 11 seats, 21.0% |
| Seats before | 25 | | 11 |
| Seats won | 28 | 10 | 6 |
| Seat change | ▲3 | ▲10 | ▼5 |
| Popular vote | 16,912 | 5,064 | 6,470 |
| Percentage | 39.8% | 11.9% | 15.2% |
| Swing | ▲3.8% | N/A | ▼5.8% |
| | Fourth party | Fifth party | Sixth party |
| Party | Liberal Democrats | Community Rep. | Independent |
| Last election | 13 seats, 21.7% | 4 seats, 8.7% | 4 seats, 6.2% |
| Seats before | 13 | 4 | 4 |
| Seats won | 6 | 5 | 3 |
| Seat change | ▼7 | ▲1 | ▼1 |
| Popular vote | 6,269 | 2,534 | 3,381 |
| Percentage | 14.8% | 6.0% | 8.0% |
| Swing | ▼6.9% | ▼2.7% | ▲1.8% |
| | Seventh party |
| Party | Holland Residents |
| Last election | 3 seats, 3.1% |
| Seats before | 3 |
| Seats won | 2 |
| Seat change | ▼1 |
| Popular vote | 1,316 |
| Percentage | 3.1% |
| Swing | 0.0% |
- Results of the 2007 Tendring District Council election
Majority party before election
No overall control
Majority party after election
No overall control

Elections to Tendring District Council were held on 5 May 2007 alongside other local elections across the United Kingdom. The Conservative Party remained the largest party.

== Summary ==
=== Election result ===
2007 Tendring District Council election
| Party | Candidates | Seats | Gains | Losses | Net gain/loss | Seats % | Votes % | Votes | +/− |
|---|---|---|---|---|---|---|---|---|---|
| Conservative | 56 | 28 | 13 | 11 | ▲3 | 46.7 | 39.8 | 16,912 | +3.8 |
| Tendring First | 19 | 10 | 10 | 0 | ▲10 | 16.7 | 11.9 | 5,064 | N/A |
| Labour | 39 | 6 | 1 | 6 | ▼5 | 10.0 | 15.2 | 6,470 | –5.8 |
| Liberal Democrats | 29 | 6 | 0 | 6 | ▼7 | 10.0 | 14.8 | 6,269 | –6.9 |
| Community Representatives | 11 | 5 | 1 | 0 | ▲1 | 8.3 | 6.0 | 2,534 | –2.7 |
| Independent | 9 | 3 | 0 | 1 | ▼1 | 5.0 | 8.0 | 3,381 | –1.8 |
| Residents | 3 | 2 | 0 | 1 | ▼1 | 3.3 | 3.1 | 1,316 | ±0.0 |
| UKIP | 2 | 0 | 0 | 0 | Steady | 0.0 | 0.7 | 296 | –0.2 |
| Green | 2 | 0 | 0 | 0 | Steady | 0.0 | 0.5 | 214 | –1.3 |

== Ward results ==
=== Alresford ===
Alresford
| Party | Candidate | Votes | % | ±% |
|---|---|---|---|---|
| Liberal Democrats | Gary Scott | 403 | 53.4 | |
| Conservative | Laurence Franklin | 277 | 36.7 | |
| Labour | Terry Ripo | 75 | 9.9 | |
| Turnout | | 755 | 44.9 | |
| Liberal Democrats hold | | Swing | | |

=== Alton Park ===
Alton Park (2 seats)
| Party | Candidate | Votes | % | ±% |
|---|---|---|---|---|
| Conservative | John Hughes | 453 | 50.4 | +26.2 |
| Labour | Delia Aldis* | 446 | 49.6 | +5.3 |
| Labour | Mark Morley-Souter* | 425 | 47.3 | +7.2 |
| Conservative | Brian Pennell | 387 | 43.0 | +21.9 |
| Turnout | | 899 | 26.9 | +5.8 |
| Registered electors | | 3,416 | | |
| Conservative gain from Labour | | | | |
| Labour hold | | | | |

=== Ardleigh & Little Bromley ===
Ardleigh & Little Bromley
| Party | Candidate | Votes | % | ±% |
|---|---|---|---|---|
| Conservative | Neil Stock | 434 | 68.9 | |
| Liberal Democrats | Graham Potter | 128 | 20.3 | |
| Labour | Vincent Campbell | 68 | 10.8 | |
| Turnout | | 630 | 35.2 | |
| Conservative hold | | Swing | | |

=== Beaumont & Thorpe ===
Beaumont & Thorpe
| Party | Candidate | Votes | % | ±% |
|---|---|---|---|---|
| Independent | José Powell | 399 | 55.5 | |
| Conservative | Dawn Skeels | 320 | 44.5 | |
| Independent hold | | Swing | | |
| Turnout | | 719 | 39.3 | |

=== Bockings Elm ===
Bockings Elm (2 seats)
| Party | Candidate | Votes | % | ±% |
|---|---|---|---|---|
| Liberal Democrats | Harry Shearing* | 604 | 45.7 | –25.4 |
| Liberal Democrats | Brian Whitson | 541 | 40.9 | –27.7 |
| Conservative | Siggy Challinor | 497 | 37.6 | +11.9 |
| Conservative | Trevor Durham | 486 | 36.8 | +14.6 |
| Labour | Richard Aldis | 221 | 16.7 | N/A |
| Labour | Graham Caines | 221 | 16.7 | N/A |
| Turnout | | 1,322 | 37.5 | +7.1 |
| Registered electors | | 3,431 | | |
| Liberal Democrats hold | | | | |
| Liberal Democrats hold | | | | |

=== Bradfield, Wrabness & Wix ===
Bradfield, Wrabness & Wix
| Party | Candidate | Votes | % | ±% |
|---|---|---|---|---|
| Conservative | Matthew Patten | 350 | 44.9 | |
| Liberal Democrats | Mark de Roy | 244 | 31.3 | |
| Green | Michael Mealing | 130 | 16.7 | |
| Labour | Wilf Rose | 55 | 7.1 | |
| Turnout | | 779 | 43.6 | |
| Conservative gain from Liberal Democrats | | Swing | | |

=== Brightlingsea ===
Brightlingsea (3 seats)
| Party | Candidate | Votes | % | ±% |
|---|---|---|---|---|
| Independent | Graham Steady | 1,682 | 57.9 | N/A |
| Conservative | Alan Goggin | 1,597 | 54.9 | +29.5 |
| Conservative | Vivien Chapman | 1,016 | 35.0 | +10.0 |
| Liberal Democrats | David Dixon* | 743 | 25.6 | –22.0 |
| Liberal Democrats | Janet Russell | 586 | 20.2 | –15.3 |
| Labour | Philip Shirley | 482 | 16.6 | –30.5 |
| Conservative | Patrick Wilde | 350 | 12.0 | N/A |
| Turnout | | 2,907 | 42.5 | +7.9 |
| Registered electors | | 6,234 | | |
| Independent hold | | | | |
| Conservative gain from Liberal Democrats | | | | |
| Conservative gain from Labour | | | | |

=== Bursville ===
Bursville
| Party | Candidate | Votes | % | ±% |
|---|---|---|---|---|
| Conservative | Charlie Sambridge | 549 | 65.7 | |
| Tendring First | Mavis Balbirnie | 105 | 12.6 | |
| Liberal Democrats | Charles Harrison | 99 | 11.9 | |
| Labour | Eve Casey | 82 | 9.8 | |
| Turnout | | 835 | 46.4 | |
| Conservative hold | | Swing | | |

=== Frinton ===
Frinton (2 seats)
| Party | Candidate | Votes | % | ±% |
|---|---|---|---|---|
| Conservative | Giles Watling | 1,010 | 57.4 | –10.5 |
| Conservative | Nick Turner* | 954 | 54.2 | –7.7 |
| Tendring First | Terry Allen | 751 | 42.6 | N/A |
| Tendring First | Jack Robertson | 656 | 37.3 | N/A |
| Turnout | | 1,761 | 50.9 | +9.6 |
| Registered electors | | 3,473 | | |
| Conservative hold | | | | |
| Conservative hold | | | | |

=== Golf Green ===
Golf Green (2 seats)
| Party | Candidate | Votes | % | ±% |
|---|---|---|---|---|
| Community Rep. | Roy Smith* | 815 | 51.7 | –25.2 |
| Community Rep. | Kevin Watson | 652 | 41.3 | –2.8 |
| Labour | Maurice Alexander | 458 | 29.0 | –4.3 |
| Labour | Dan Casey | 400 | 25.4 | N/A |
| Conservative | Cherie Clark | 304 | 19.3 | +3.7 |
| Conservative | Brian McCann | 293 | 18.6 | N/A |
| Turnout | | 1,577 | 39.7 | +3.3 |
| Registered electors | | 3,953 | | |
| Community Rep. hold | | | | |
| Community Rep. hold | | | | |

=== Great & Little Oakley ===
Great & Little Oakley
| Party | Candidate | Votes | % | ±% |
|---|---|---|---|---|
| Conservative | Tanya Ferguson | 303 | 49.4 | |
| Labour | Malcolm Bell | 130 | 21.2 | |
| Tendring First | David Turner | 125 | 20.4 | |
| Liberal Democrats | Matthew Bensilum | 55 | 9.0 | |
| Turnout | | 613 | 35.3 | |
| Conservative hold | | Swing | | |

=== Great Bentley ===
Great Bentley
| Party | Candidate | Votes | % | ±% |
|---|---|---|---|---|
| Conservative | Lynda McWilliams | 509 | 58.3 | |
| Liberal Democrats | Robert Taylor | 280 | 32.1 | |
| Green | Oliver King | 84 | 9.6 | |
| Turnout | | 873 | 49.7 | |
| Conservative hold | | Swing | | |

=== Hamford ===
Hamford (2 seats)
| Party | Candidate | Votes | % | ±% |
|---|---|---|---|---|
| Tendring First | Iris Johnson* | 834 | 45.9 | N/A |
| Tendring First | Anne Hockridge | 712 | 39.2 | N/A |
| Conservative | Charles Braithwaite | 620 | 34.1 | –38.8 |
| Independent | Geoff Francis | 207 | 11.4 | N/A |
| Liberal Democrats | Sheila Harrison | 157 | 8.6 | –8.4 |
| Turnout | | 1,818 | 43.1 | +5.4 |
| Registered electors | | 3,303 | | |
| Tendring First gain from Conservative | | | | |
| Tendring First gain from Conservative | | | | |

=== Harwich East ===
Harwich East
| Party | Candidate | Votes | % | ±% |
|---|---|---|---|---|
| Labour | Lawrie Payne* | 272 | 41.5 | |
| Community Rep. | Michael Gardener | 261 | 39.8 | |
| Conservative | Emily van der Bijl | 123 | 18.8 | |
| Turnout | | 656 | 34.5 | |

=== Harwich East Central ===
Harwich East Central (2 seats)
| Party | Candidate | Votes | % | ±% |
|---|---|---|---|---|
| Labour | Gary Calver | 538 | 38.1 | –6.5 |
| Labour | Dave McLeod | 516 | 36.6 | –6.4 |
| Conservative | Ben Howlett | 482 | 34.2 | –9.8 |
| Conservative | Barry Brown | 439 | 31.1 | N/A |
| Community Rep. | Fraser Leeks | 244 | 17.3 | –10.9 |
| Community Rep. | Martyn Donn | 231 | 16.4 | N/A |
| Liberal Democrats | Keith Tully | 147 | 10.4 | N/A |
| Turnout | | 1,411 | 37.6 | +6.8 |
| Registered electors | | 3,603 | | |
| Labour hold | | | | |
| Labour gain from Conservative | | | | |

=== Harwich West ===
Harwich West (2 seats)
| Party | Candidate | Votes | % | ±% |
|---|---|---|---|---|
| Labour | Les Double* | 451 | 34.0 | –18.0 |
| Conservative | Ricky Callender | 405 | 30.5 | ±0.0 |
| Conservative | Joanne Firth | 384 | 29.0 | N/A |
| Labour | Hugh Markham-Lee* | 353 | 26.6 | –12.1 |
| Community Rep. | Brain Cunnew | 321 | 24.2 | –3.7 |
| Community Rep. | Lesley Donn | 297 | 22.4 | +0.7 |
| Independent | Lindsay Glenn | 247 | 18.6 | N/A |
| Liberal Democrats | Tracey McCartney | 149 | 11.2 | N/A |
| Turnout | | 1,326 | 34.6 | +5.0 |
| Registered electors | | 3,964 | | |
| Labour hold | | | | |
| Conservative gain from Labour | | | | |

=== Harwich West Central ===
Harwich West Central (2 seats)
| Party | Candidate | Votes | % | ±% |
|---|---|---|---|---|
| Community Rep. | Steven Henderson* | 611 | 46.7 | –11.9 |
| Community Rep. | David Rutson* | 554 | 42.4 | –8.1 |
| Labour | Vickie Williams | 360 | 27.5 | –4.6 |
| Labour | John Thurlow | 352 | 26.9 | –5.2 |
| Conservative | Claire Callender | 336 | 25.7 | +6.3 |
| Conservative | Paul Southgate | 287 | 22.0 | N/A |
| Turnout | | 1,307 | 36.1 | +3.9 |
| Registered electors | | 3,612 | | |
| Community Rep. hold | | | | |
| Community Rep. hold | | | | |

=== Haven ===
Haven
| Party | Candidate | Votes | % | ±% |
|---|---|---|---|---|
| Conservative | Joy Broderick | 472 | 53.6 | |
| Residents | Michael Vaughn-Chatfield | 408 | 46.4 | |
| Turnout | | 880 | 48.3 | |
| Conservative gain from Residents | | Swing | | |

=== Holland & Kirby ===
Holland & Kirby (2 seats)
| Party | Candidate | Votes | % | ±% |
|---|---|---|---|---|
| Tendring First | Mark Cossens* | Unopposed | | |
| Tendring First | Robert Bucke* | Unopposed | | |
| Registered electors | | 3,756 | | |
| Tendring First gain from Conservative | | | | |
| Tendring First gain from Conservative | | | | |

=== Homelands ===
Homelands
| Party | Candidate | Votes | % | ±% |
|---|---|---|---|---|
| Tendring First | David Lines | 460 | 61.1 | |
| Labour | Dick Hebborn | 149 | 19.8 | |
| Liberal Democrats | Robert Kent | 144 | 19.1 | |
| Turnout | | 783 | 45.7 | |
| Registered electors | | 1,692 | | |
| Tendring First gain from Conservative | | Swing | | |

=== Lawford ===
Lawford (2 seats)
| Party | Candidate | Votes | % | ±% |
|---|---|---|---|---|
| Conservative | Sarah Candy* | 522 | 44.0 | –5.6 |
| Conservative | Valerie Gugliemli | 519 | 43.7 | N/A |
| Liberal Democrats | Tracy Hunter | 256 | 21.6 | –17.2 |
| Liberal Democrats | John Kelly* | 251 | 21.1 | N/A |
| UKIP | David MacDonald | 182 | 15.3 | N/A |
| Labour | Stacy Turner | 182 | 15.3 | –7.0 |
| Labour | Zoe Double | 178 | 15.0 | –6.7 |
| Community Rep. | David Smy | 45 | 3.8 | –13.1 |
| Turnout | | 1,187 | 34.5 | +7.3 |
| Registered electors | | 3,333 | | |
| Conservative hold | | | | |
| Conservative gain from Liberal Democrats | | | | |

=== Little Clacton & Weeley ===
Little Clacton & Weeley (2 seats)
| Party | Candidate | Votes | % | ±% |
|---|---|---|---|---|
| Conservative | Mick Skeels | 514 | 32.5 | –28.8 |
| Tendring First | Peter Balbernie* | 500 | 31.6 | N/A |
| Conservative | Iain Wicks | 428 | 27.1 | –30.3 |
| Tendring First | Bernard Leatherdale | 423 | 26.8 | N/A |
| Labour | Janet Bloomfield | 239 | 15.1 | –6.1 |
| Liberal Democrats | Michael Brown | 211 | 13.4 | –17.3 |
| Labour | Tony Sargent | 205 | 13.0 | N/A |
| Liberal Democrats | Ricky Hunn | 168 | 10.6 | N/A |
| UKIP | Alan Olford | 116 | 7.3 | N/A |
| Turnout | | 1,580 | 38.3 | +11.7 |
| Registered electors | | 3,771 | | |
| Conservative hold | | | | |
| Tendring First gain from Conservative | | | | |

=== Manningtree, Mistley, Little Bentley & Tendring ===
Manningtree, Mistley, Little Bentley & Tendring (2 seats)
| Party | Candidate | Votes | % | ±% |
|---|---|---|---|---|
| Conservative | Carlo Guglielmi | 634 | 43.5 | +6.0 |
| Liberal Democrats | Michael Dew* | 600 | 43.5 | –6.4 |
| Conservative | Paul Maher | 586 | 42.5 | +5.7 |
| Liberal Democrats | James Carter | 518 | 37.6 | –9.1 |
| Labour | Louise Armstrong | 135 | 9.8 | –4.3 |
| Labour | John Ford | 120 | 8.7 | N/A |
| Turnout | | 1,378 | 38.5 | +5.9 |
| Registered electors | | 3,523 | | |
| Conservative gain from Liberal Democrats | | | | |
| Liberal Democrats hold | | | | |

=== Peter Bruff ===
Peter Bruff (2 seats)
| Party | Candidate | Votes | % | ±% |
|---|---|---|---|---|
| Liberal Democrats | Sue Shearing* | 400 | 36.5 | –29.3 |
| Conservative | Mitch Mitchell | 353 | 32.2 | +4.5 |
| Conservative | Pam Sambridge | 326 | 29.7 | +4.7 |
| Liberal Democrats | Jacqui Augrandjean | 332 | 30.3 | –35.0 |
| Independent | Philip Sherman | 189 | 17.2 | N/A |
| Labour | John Rigby | 155 | 14.1 | N/A |
| Labour | Anne Alexander | 141 | 12.9 | N/A |
| Turnout | | 1,097 | 30.2 | +8.8 |
| Registered electors | | 3,355 | | |
| Liberal Democrats hold | | | | |
| Conservative gain from Liberal Democrats | | | | |

=== Pier ===
Pier (2 seats)
| Party | Candidate | Votes | % | ±% |
|---|---|---|---|---|
| Conservative | Paul Honeywood | 376 | 34.3 | –12.9 |
| Conservative | Sue Honeywood | 359 | 32.7 | –11.4 |
| Tendring First | Ann Oxley* | 280 | 25.5 | N/A |
| Tendring First | Ron Stephenson | 254 | 23.2 | N/A |
| Labour | Kevin Colman | 240 | 21.9 | –16.6 |
| Labour | Roy Raby | 209 | 19.1 | –19.4 |
| Independent | Chris Humphrey | 27 | 2.5 | N/A |
| Turnout | | 923 | 26.5 | +5.3 |
| Registered electors | | 3,355 | | |
| Conservative hold | | | | |
| Conservative hold | | | | |

=== Ramsey & Parkeston ===
Ramsey & Parkeston
| Party | Candidate | Votes | % | ±% |
|---|---|---|---|---|
| Community Rep. | John Brown | 237 | 40.2 | |
| Labour | George Elmer* | 187 | 31.7 | |
| Conservative | Michelle Curme | 168 | 28.0 | |
| Turnout | | 589 | 32.4 | |
| Registered electors | | 1,827 | | |
| Community Rep. gain from Labour | | Swing | | |

=== Rush Green ===
Rush Green (2 seats)
| Party | Candidate | Votes | % | ±% |
|---|---|---|---|---|
| Conservative | Danny Mayzes | 554 | 60.6 | +32.5 |
| Conservative | Stephen Mayzes | 509 | 55.7 | N/A |
| Labour | Clive Baker | 360 | 39.4 | –3.2 |
| Labour | Ken Aldis | 359 | 39.3 | –0.9 |
| Turnout | | 914 | 28.2 | +7.7 |
| Registered electors | | 3,346 | | |
| Conservative gain from Labour | | | | |
| Conservative gain from Labour | | | | |

=== St Bartholomews ===
St Bartholomews (2 seats)
| Party | Candidate | Votes | % | ±% |
|---|---|---|---|---|
| Residents | Mary Bragg* | 908 | 51.6 | +1.6 |
| Residents | KT King | 853 | 48.4 | +2.8 |
| Conservative | Linda Mead | 783 | 44.5 | +1.1 |
| Conservative | Hugh Morrison | 778 | 44.2 | +1.9 |
| Turnout | | 1,761 | 46.3 | +8.3 |
| Registered electors | | 3,829 | | |
| Residents hold | | | | |
| Residents hold | | | | |

=== St. James ===
St. James (2 seats)
| Party | Candidate | Votes | % | ±% |
|---|---|---|---|---|
| Conservative | Chris Griffiths* | 727 | 53.1 | +16.7 |
| Conservative | Gill Downing* | 671 | 49.0 | +14.3 |
| Tendring First | Susan Marcus | 280 | 20.5 | N/A |
| Tendring First | Linda Allen | 250 | 18.3 | N/A |
| Labour | David Bolton | 195 | 14.3 | –8.2 |
| Liberal Democrats | Christine Jarvis | 166 | 12.1 | –21.9 |
| Turnout | | 1,368 | 37.4 | +4.8 |
| Registered electors | | 3,304 | | |
| Conservative hold | | | | |
| Conservative hold | | | | |

=== St. Johns ===
St. Johns (2 seats)
| Party | Candidate | Votes | % | ±% |
|---|---|---|---|---|
| Conservative | Peter Halliday | 558 | 41.2 | +10.9 |
| Liberal Democrats | Jeffrey Cripps* | 538 | 39.7 | –13.9 |
| Liberal Democrats | Brian Gooch | 472 | 34.9 | –11.9 |
| Conservative | Sheila Wilde | 464 | 34.3 | +5.2 |
| Labour | Linda Jacobs | 258 | 19.1 | –2.4 |
| Turnout | | 1,354 | 35.5 | +6.2 |
| Registered electors | | 3,661 | | |
| Conservative gain from Liberal Democrats | | | | |
| Liberal Democrats hold | | | | |

=== St Marys ===
St Marys (2 seats)
| Party | Candidate | Votes | % | ±% |
|---|---|---|---|---|
| Conservative | Tony Fawcett | 421 | 32.4 | –0.4 |
| Labour | Ian Beckett | 419 | 32.2 | –1.0 |
| Conservative | John Chittock | 400 | 30.8 | –0.4 |
| Labour | Norman Jacobs | 362 | 27.8 | –3.8 |
| Liberal Democrats | Cynthia Hursey | 337 | 25.9 | –5.0 |
| Liberal Democrats | Marie Clifford-Hales | 263 | 20.2 | –6.1 |
| Independent | John Hones | 123 | 9.5 | N/A |
| Turnout | | 1,300 | 33.4 | +12.1 |
| Registered electors | | 3,715 | | |
| Conservative hold | | | | |
| Labour hold | | | | |

=== St Osyth & Point Clear ===
St Osyth & Point Clear (2 seats)
| Party | Candidate | Votes | % | ±% |
|---|---|---|---|---|
| Independent | Michael Talbot* | 507 | 38.2 | –22.8 |
| Conservative | Ron Walker | 507 | 38.2 | +5.3 |
| Independent | John White | 506 | 38.1 | –20.7 |
| Conservative | Hayley Turner | 433 | 32.6 | N/A |
| Labour | Julie Ward | 313 | 23.6 | N/A |
| Labour | Tracey Osben | 308 | 23.2 | N/A |
| Turnout | | 1,327 | 36.4 | +6.3 |
| Registered electors | | 3,701 | | |
| Independent hold | | | | |
| Conservative gain from Independent | | | | |

=== St Pauls ===
St Pauls (2 seats)
| Party | Candidate | Votes | % | ±% |
|---|---|---|---|---|
| Tendring First | Pierre Oxley* | 1,106 | 71.5 | N/A |
| Tendring First | David Oxley | 1,086 | 70.2 | N/A |
| Conservative | Catherine Jessop* | 440 | 28.5 | –33.8 |
| Conservative | Matthew Woods | 384 | 24.8 | –30.3 |
| Turnout | | 1,546 | 42.5 | +8.5 |
| Registered electors | | 3,693 | | |
| Tendring First gain from Conservative | | | | |
| Tendring First gain from Conservative | | | | |

=== Thorrington, Frating, Elmstead & Great Bromley ===
Thorrington, Frating, Elmstead & Great Bromley (2 seats)
| Party | Candidate | Votes | % | ±% |
|---|---|---|---|---|
| Conservative | Rosemary Heaney | 957 | 71.7 | +21.2 |
| Conservative | Peter Scott | 847 | 63.4 | +14.9 |
| Liberal Democrats | Peter Redding | 378 | 28.3 | –17.7 |
| Turnout | | 1,335 | 35.6 | +4.2 |
| Registered electors | | 3,648 | | |
| Conservative hold | | | | |
| Conservative hold | | | | |

=== Walton ===
Walton (2 seats)
| Party | Candidate | Votes | % | ±% |
|---|---|---|---|---|
| Tendring First | Jan King* | 623 | 57.5 | N/A |
| Tendring First | Christine Turner* | 609 | 56.2 | N/A |
| Conservative | Seb Craig | 370 | 34.2 | –35.6 |
| Conservative | Delyth Miles | 354 | 32.7 | –33.1 |
| Liberal Democrats | Kris Gurney | 230 | 21.2 | N/A |
| Turnout | | 1,083 | 36.6 | +8.2 |
| Registered electors | | 3,302 | | |
| Tendring First gain from Conservative | | | | |
| Tendring First gain from Conservative | | | | |
