= 2015 Tendring District Council election =

2015 UK local government election

- 7 May 2015

All 60 seats 31 seats seats needed for a majority

	First party	Second party	Third party
Party	Conservative	UKIP	Independent
Last election	33	0	5
Seats before	33	0	5
Seats won	23	22	6
Seat change	▼10	▲22	▲1
Popular vote	43,039	26,832	9,023
Percentage	37.4%	23.3%	7.8%
Swing	▼2.3%	▲21.4%	▼0.8%
	Fourth party	Fifth party	Sixth party
Party	Labour	Holland Residents	Tendring First
Last election	8	3	8
Seats before	8	3	8
Seats won	4	3	1
Seat change	▼4	Steady	▼7
Popular vote	19,366	4,812	8,198
Percentage	16.8%	4.2%	7.1%
Swing	▼1.8%	▲0.1%	▼5.2%
	Seventh party	Eighth party
Party	Liberal Democrats	Green
Last election	2	0
Seats before	2	0
Seats won	1	0
Seat change	▼1	Steady
Popular vote	1,995	1,894
Percentage	1.7%	1.6%
Swing	▼8.3%	▼1.1%
- Tendring UK 2015 Council Election
Majority party before election
Conservative
Majority party after election
No overall control

The 2015 Tendring District Council election took place on 7 May 2015 to elect members of Tendring District Council in England. This was on the same day as other local elections.

== Results summary ==
2015 Tendring District Council election
Party	Candidates	Seats	Gains	Losses	Net gain/loss	Seats %	Votes %	Votes	+/−
Conservative	60	23	2	12	▼10	38.3	37.4	43,039	-2.3
UKIP	37	22	22	0	▲22	36.7	23.3	26,832	+21.4
Independent	7	6	2	1	▲1	10.0	7.8	9,023	-0.8
Labour	46	4	1	5	▼4	6.7	16.8	19,366	-1.8
Holland-on-Sea Residents' Association	3	3	0	0	Steady	5.0	4.2	4,812	+0.1
Tendring First	11	1	0	7	▼7	1.7	7.1	8,198	-5.2
Liberal Democrats	4	1	0	1	▼1	1.7	1.7	1,995	-8.3
Green	5	0	0	0	Steady	0.0	1.6	1,894	-1.1

== Ward results ==
=== Alresford ===
Alresford
Party	Candidate	Votes	%	±%
Liberal Democrats	Gary Scott	828	68.8	−6.1
Conservative	Angela Rothwell	265	22.0	+5.9
Labour	Terry Ripo	110	9.1	+0.2
Majority		563	46.8	
Turnout		1,203	72.7	
Liberal Democrats hold		Swing	▼6.0	

=== Alton Park ===
Alton Park (2 seats)
Party	Candidate	Votes	%	±%
UKIP	Peter Cawthorn	794	51.3	N/A
UKIP	Alex Porter	641	41.4	N/A
Labour Co-op	Graham Caines	465	30.0	−29.6
Labour Co-op	Delia Aldis	455	29.5	−27.3
Conservative	Mary Mersh	400	25.8	−19.5
Conservative	Brian Mersh	340	22.0	−16.3
Turnout			50.3	
UKIP gain from Labour Co-op				
UKIP gain from Labour Co-op				

=== Ardleigh and Little Bromley ===
Ardleigh and Little Bromley
Party	Candidate	Votes	%	±%
Conservative	Neil Stock	985	77.4	+23.3
Labour	Pamela Watson	288	22.6	N/A
Majority		699	54.8	
Turnout		1,273		
Conservative hold				

=== Beaumont and Thorpe ===
Beaumont and Thorpe
Party	Candidate	Votes	%	±%
Conservative	Daniel Land	902	67.2	+24.1
UKIP	Chris Cotter	272	20.3	N/A
Labour	Alan Roebuck	169	12.6	N/A
Majority		630	46.9	
Turnout		1,343		
Conservative gain from Independent				

=== Bockings Elm ===
Bockings Elm (2 seats)
Party	Candidate	Votes	%	±%
UKIP	John Chittock	1,180	54.9	N/A
UKIP	Ted Whitmore	869	40.4	N/A
Conservative	Siggy Challinor	815	37.9	−0.9
Conservative	Stuart Morgan	724	33.7	−1.4
Labour	Colin Watson	362	16.8	−6.6
Labour	Fiona Hayes	349	16.2	−6.6
Turnout				
UKIP gain from Liberal Democrats				
UKIP gain from Conservative				

=== Bradfield, Wrabness and Wix ===
Bradfield, Wrabness and Wix
Party	Candidate	Votes	%	±%
Conservative	Zoe Fairley	723	51.8	−6.6
UKIP	Mark Morsley	399	28.6	N/A
Labour	Graham Ford	273	19.6	N/A
Majority		324	23.3	
Turnout				
Conservative hold				

=== Brightlingsea ===
Brightlingsea (3 seats)
Party	Candidate	Votes	%	±%
Independent	Jayne Chapman	2,451	64.8	+0.4
Independent	Graham Steady	2,185	57.8	−5.4
Independent	Karen Yallop	1,520	40.2	+3.3
Conservative	Alan Goggin	1,473	39.0	−2.8
Conservative	Vivien Chapman	1,197	31.7	+1.4
Conservative	Elizabeth Edey	786	20.8	+1.3
Green	Bev Maltby	633	16.7	N/A
Labour	Carol Carlsson Browne	633	16.7	−7.1
Labour	Rebecca Collins	464	12.3	N/A
Turnout				
Independent hold				
Independent hold				
Independent gain from Conservative				

=== Bursville ===
Burrsville
Party	Candidate	Votes	%	±%
UKIP	Mick Skeels	531	41.6	N/A
Conservative	Pam Sambridge	520	40.7	−15.3
Labour	Wayne Tearle	146	11.4	−8.6
Green	Chris Southall	80	6.3	−1.9
Majority		11	0.9	
Turnout		1,277		
UKIP gain from Conservative				

=== Frinton ===
Frinton (2 seats)
Party	Candidate	Votes	%	±%
Conservative	Giles Watling	1,269	59.5	−1.2
Conservative	Nick Turner	1,137	53.3	−3.0
Tendring First	Terry Allen	701	32.9	−6.9
UKIP	Jack Parsons	681	31.9	N/A
Labour	Susan Morley-Souter	246	11.5	+3.4
Labour	Mark Morley-Souter	230	10.8	+3.5
Turnout				
Conservative hold				
Conservative hold				

=== Golf Green ===
Golf Green (2 seats)
Party	Candidate	Votes	%	±%
UKIP	Kevin Watson	1,185	55.3	N/A
UKIP	Roy Raby	1,135	53.0	N/A
Labour Co-op	Dan Casey	618	28.9	−18.2
Labour Co-op	Nick Brown	508	23.7	−15.2
Conservative	Beverly Moule	425	19.8	−19.0
Conservative	Anne Alexander	412	19.2	−13.1
Turnout				
UKIP gain from Labour Co-op				
UKIP gain from Labour Co-op				

=== Great and Little Oakley ===
Great and Little Oakley
Party	Candidate	Votes	%	±%
Independent	Tom Howard	405	35.2	N/A
Conservative	Steve Harris	319	27.7	−11.6
UKIP	Andy Erskine	261	23.7	+5.0
Labour	John McAllister	166	14.4	N/A
Majority		86	7.5	N/A
Turnout		1,151		
Independent gain from Tendring First				

=== Great Bentley ===
Great Bentley
Party	Candidate	Votes	%	±%
Conservative	Lynda McWilliams	785	64.4	−3.5
Liberal Democrats	Robert Taylor	304	24.9	−7.2
Labour	Louise Armstrong	130	10.6	N/A
Majority		481	39.5	
Turnout		1,219		
Conservative hold		Swing	▲1.9	

=== Hamford ===
Hamford (2 seats)
Party	Candidate	Votes	%	±%
UKIP	Anne Davis	917	43.3	N/A
Conservative	Mark Platt	829	38.2	−8.9
Conservative	Vanda Watling	761	36.0	−5.6
UKIP	Christopher Shepherd	652	30.8	N/A
Tendring First	Iris Johnson	504	23.8	−18.8
Tendring First	Paul Clifton	341	16.1	−18.8
Labour	Bryan Whitcomb	229	10.8	−5.8
Turnout				
UKIP gain from Tendring First				
Conservative hold				

=== Harwich East ===
Harwich East
Party	Candidate	Votes	%	±%
Labour	Ivan Henderson	686	65.0	+5.9
Conservative	Angela Purbrick	370	35.0	+9.7
Majority		316	30.0	
Turnout		1,056		
Labour hold		Swing	▼1.9	

=== Harwich East Central ===
Harwich East Central (2 seats)
Party	Candidate	Votes	%	±%
Labour	Garry Calver	946	49.3	−1.6
Conservative	Barry Brown	758	39.5	−2.9
Labour	Dave McLeod	757	39.5	−4.4
Conservative	Robert Day	698	36.4	−3.0
UKIP	Simon Ashley	678	35.3	+11.8
Turnout				
Labour hold				
Conservative gain from Labour				

=== Harwich West ===
Harwich West (2 seats)
Party	Candidate	Votes	%	±%
Conservative	Ricky Callender	865	38.8	−6.6
UKIP	John Brown	779	35.0	N/A
Labour	Pamela Morrison	761	34.2	−12.1
Conservative	Sean Fay	710	31.9	−5.1
Labour	John Hawkins	673	30.2	−7.5
UKIP	John Thurlow	668	30.0	N/A
Turnout				
Conservative hold				
UKIP gain from Labour				

=== Harwich West Central ===
Harwich West Central (2 seats)
Party	Candidate	Votes	%	±%
Labour	Jo Henderson	1,206	60.4	+13.5
Labour	Maria Fowler	988	49.5	N/A
Conservative	Darrell Howard	921	46.1	+6.4
Conservative	Susannah Marie	880	44.1	+11.1
Turnout				
Labour hold				
Labour gain from Conservative				

=== Haven ===
Haven
Party	Candidate	Votes	%	±%
Holland Residents	Joy Broderick	1,041	80.2	+9.5
Conservative	Andrea Cossens	257	19.8	−9.5
Majority		784	60.4	
Turnout		1,298		
Holland Residents hold		Swing	▲9.5	

=== Holland and Kirby ===
Holland and Kirby (2 seats)
Party	Candidate	Votes	%	±%
Conservative	Mark Cossens	956	40.2	+3.2
Tendring First	Robert Bucke	850	35.7	−21.3
UKIP	Richard Everett	820	34.5	N/A
Conservative	Pamela Walford	766	32.2	+4.6
UKIP	Karl Whillier	617	25.9	N/A
Tendring First	Chris Keston	476	20.0	−34.5
Labour	Dave Bolton	274	11.5	−3.3
Turnout				
Conservative gain from Tendring First				
Tendring First hold				

=== Homelands ===
Homelands
Party	Candidate	Votes	%	±%
UKIP	Laurie Gray	583	52.1	N/A
Conservative	Mick Page	535	47.9	+1.3
Majority		48	4.4	
Turnout		1,118		
UKIP gain from Conservative				

=== Lawford ===
Lawford (2 seats)
Party	Candidate	Votes	%	±%
Conservative	Val Guglielmi	1,190	62.8	+11.3
Conservative	Andy Baker	1,143	60.3	+16.6
Labour	Richard Kenny	580	30.6	+1.6
Labour	Jo Richardson	476	25.1	N/A
Green	Eleanor Gordon	399	21.1	−0.9
Turnout				
Conservative hold				
Conservative hold				

=== Little Clacton and Weeley ===
Little Clacton and Weeley (2 seats)
Party	Candidate	Votes	%	±%
UKIP	Jeffrey Bray	984	45.2	N/A
Conservative	Mike Brown	897	41.2	+1.9
Conservative	Anita Bailey	836	38.4	±0.0
UKIP	Sandy White	710	32.6	N/A
Tendring First	Pete De-Vaux Balbirnie	494	22.7	−17.8
Tendring First	Mavis De-Vaux Balbirnie	430	19.8	−15.9
Turnout				
UKIP gain from Tendring First				
Conservative hold				

On 10 May 2015, UKIP's Jeff Bray resigned from the party and sat as an independent for the remainder of his term.

=== Manningtree, Mistley, Little Bentley and Tendring ===
Manningtree, Mistley, Little Bentley and Tendring (2 seats)
Party	Candidate	Votes	%	±%
Conservative	Alan Coley	1,299	64.9	+12.8
Conservative	Carlo Guglielmi	1,245	62.2	+12.5
Green	Duncan Gordon	782	39.1	+11.2
Labour	Cameron Scott	675	33.7	N/A
Turnout				
Conservative hold				
Conservative hold				

=== Peter Bruff ===
Peter Bruff (2 seats)
Party	Candidate	Votes	%	±%
UKIP	Lis Bennison	836	50.4	N/A
UKIP	Andrew Pemberton	679	40.9	N/A
Conservative	Gwen Mitchell	652	39.3	−3.9
Conservative	Sara Richardson	538	32.4	−8.9
Labour	Joseph Freebody	360	21.7	−3.2
Liberal Democrats	Rob Harper	252	15.2	−21.5
Turnout				
UKIP gain from Conservative				
UKIP gain from Conservative				

=== Pier ===
Pier (2 seats)
Party	Candidate	Votes	%	±%
Conservative	Paul Honeywood	618	37.1	−10.2
UKIP	Mohammad Khan	609	36.6	N/A
UKIP	Graham Townley	607	36.5	N/A
Conservative	Sue Honeywood	591	35.5	−11.1
Labour	Wendy Davidson	473	28.4	+1.8
Labour	Gary McNamara	432	25.9	+3.7
Turnout				
Conservative hold				
UKIP gain from Conservative				

=== Ramsey and Parkeston ===
Ramsey and Parkeston
Party	Candidate	Votes	%	±%
Conservative	Tanya Ferguson	390	36.9	−4.0
UKIP	Anthony Colbourne	388	36.7	+12.2
Labour	Charlie Powell	278	26.3	−8.4
Majority		2	0.2	
Turnout		1,056		
Conservative hold		Swing	▼8.1	

=== Rush Green ===
Rush Green (2 seats)
Party	Candidate	Votes	%	±%
UKIP	Mary Newton	870	52.1	N/A
UKIP	Leonard Sibbald	751	44.9	N/A
Conservative	Danny Mayzes	540	32.3	−16.6
Conservative	Andy Wood	439	26.3	−20.2
Labour	Pia Smith	385	23.0	−14.2
Labour	Steve Smith	357	21.4	−12.8
Turnout				
UKIP gain from Conservative				
UKIP gain from Conservative				

=== St. Bartholomews ===
St. Bartholomews (2 seats)
Party	Candidate	Votes	%	±%
Residents	Colin Winfield	1,903	80.5	+5.5
Residents	K.T. King	1,868	79.0	+7.5
Conservative	Alan Bailey	553	23.4	−6.1
Conservative	Lizi Ninnim	403	17.1	−6.9
Turnout				
Residents hold				
Residents hold				

=== St. James ===
St. James (2 seats)
Party	Candidate	Votes	%	±%
UKIP	Martin Hughes	933	47.6	N/A
Conservative	Chris Griffiths	848	43.3	−15.1
Conservative	Maurice Alexander	770	39.3	−15.4
UKIP	Teresa O'Hara	741	40.3	N/A
Labour	Denis Barry-Smith	385	19.6	+0.1
Independent	Tony Fawcett	244	12.4	N/A
Turnout				
UKIP gain from Conservative				
Conservative hold				

=== St. John's ===
St. John's (2 seats)
Party	Candidate	Votes	%	±%
UKIP	Mick Skeels	1,234	64.5	N/A
Conservative	Chris Amos	818	42.8	−4.0
Conservative	Bernard Leatherdale	680	35.6	−6.9
Labour	Samantha Atkinson	503	26.3	−8.7
Labour	Eve Casey	348	18.2	−11.1
Green	Rosie Dodds	241	12.6	+4.0
Turnout				
UKIP gain from Conservative				
Conservative hold				

=== St. Marys ===
St. Marys (2 seats)
Party	Candidate	Votes	%	±%
UKIP	John Hones	1,081	52.4	N/A
UKIP	Mark Stephenson	973	47.2	N/A
Conservative	Richard Bleach	593	28.7	−9.1
Conservative	Eileen Sills	580	28.1	−2.6
Labour	Clive Baker	465	22.5	−5.6
Labour	Norman Jacobs	435	21.1	−4.3
Turnout				
UKIP gain from Conservative				
UKIP gain from Tendring First				

=== St. Osyth and Point Clear ===
St. Osyth and Point Clear (2 seats)
Party	Candidate	Votes	%	±%
Independent	Michael Talbot	1,159	57.0	+11.1
Independent	John White	1,059	52.1	+6.5
Conservative	Rita Bailey	635	31.2	−3.7
Conservative	Kristian Brown	579	28.5	+0.1
Labour	Tracey Osben	362	17.8	−8.2
Labour	Jon Salisbury	273	13.4	−5.7
Turnout				
Independent hold				
Independent hold				

=== St. Pauls ===
St. Pauls (2 seats)
Party	Candidate	Votes	%	±%
UKIP	John Mooney	944	40.4	N/A
Conservative	Andy Massey	838	35.9	−7.0
Tendring First	Pierre Oxley	766	32.8	−26.8
UKIP	Mike Vaughan-Chatfield	760	32.5	N/A
Tendring First	Ann Oxley	754	32.3	−26.2
Conservative	Jonathan Norman	611	26.2	−12.8
Turnout				
UKIP gain from Tendring First				
Conservative gain from Tendring First				

=== Thorrington, Frating, Elmstead and Great Bromley ===
Thorrington, Frating, Elmstead and Great Bromley (2 seats)
Party	Candidate	Votes	%	±%
Conservative	Rosemary Heaney	1,613	75.9	+10.8
Conservative	Fred Nicholls	1,502	70.7	+14.7
Labour	Janet Smith	625	29.4	N/A
Liberal Democrats	Rosemary Smith	611	24.0	−16.8
Turnout				
Conservative hold				
Conservative hold				

=== Walton ===
Walton (2 seats)
Party	Candidate	Votes	%	±%
UKIP	Bridget Poonian	759	40.9	N/A
Conservative	Margaret Miles	618	33.3	−12.9
UKIP	Ben Smith	544	29.3	N/A
Conservative	Antony Pugh	459	24.8	−15.3
Labour	Gary Henderson	338	18.2	−6.8
Tendring First	David Oxley	337	18.2	−16.7
Tendring First	Jack Robertson	327	17.6	−6.0
Labour	Keith Henderson	325	17.5	−6.0
Turnout				
UKIP gain from Conservative				
Conservative hold				
