= Tendring First =

- Leader: Terry Allen
- Founder: Terry Allen
- Founded: 26 March 2007; 19 years ago
- Split from: Conservative Party
- Headquarters: Frinton-on-Sea, Essex
- Ideology: Localism
- Colours: Orange
- Essex County Council (Tendring seats): 0 / 8
- Tendring District Council: 1 / 48
- Frinton and Walton Town Council: 8 / 16

Tendring First is a local political party operating throughout Tendring, Essex, England. They field candidates for Tendring District Council, Essex County Council and Frinton and Walton Town Council. They currently have one councillor on Tendring District Council, where they form the administration with Independent, Labour and Liberal Democrat councillors. They also have control of Frinton & Walton Town Council with eight councillors.

The party had one councillor on Essex County Council between 2013 and 2016. They have not stood a candidate in a parliamentary election since 2010.

== History ==
Tendring First was founded in March 2007 by the then leader of Tendring District Council, Terry Allen, after he and two other district councillors, along with the Mayor of Frinton Jack Robertson, were all suspended from the Conservative Party in February. It was unclear why they were suspended, but their suspension just a few months before the 2007 Tendring District Council election meant they would be unable to stand again as Conservatives. In April, Tendring First announced it would contest in 19 seats in the upcoming district council election. The party was subsequently joined by two Essex County Councillors: Mark Cossens and Pierre Oxley, who had earlier been suspended from the Conservative Party.

Although party leader Terry Allen was unsuccessful in his re-election bid, Tendring First was able to secure 10 of the 60 council seats, becoming the second largest party on the council behind only the Conservatives.

In December 2008, Kevin Watson, and council chairman Roy Smith, defected to Tendring First from the Community Representatives Party.

In the 2009 Essex County Council election both the party's councillors lost their seats to the Conservatives.

Allen ran as a candidate for Clacton in the 2010 general election, where he came 5th with 2.5% of the vote.

The party endorsed independent candidate Linda Belgrove in the 2012 Essex police and crime commissioner election. She came 4th with 13.2% of first round votes.

In 2013 Pierre Oxley regained his Clacton East seat from the Conservatives. In 2016, he was banned from being a councillor for five years, after being given a two-year suspended jail term for fraud. The party did not run a candidate in the subsequent by-election, which was won by the Holland-on-Sea Residents' Association.

After the 2023 District Council election, the party's sole councillor, Ann Oxley, joined the coalition administration with independents, Labour and Liberal Democrats. Town councillor Paul Clifton, previously mayor of Frinton and Walton, defected from Tendring First to Reform UK in October 2024.

== Election results ==
=== District Council elections ===
| Year | Councillors | Control |
|---|---|---|
| 2007 | 10 / 60 | No overall control |
| 2011 | 8 / 60 | No overall control |
| 2015 | 1 / 60 | Conservative |
| 2019 | 4 / 48 | No overall control |
| 2023 | 1 / 48 | No overall control |

=== County Council elections ===
| Year | Tendring Councillors | Control |
|---|---|---|
| 2009 | 0 / 8 | Conservative |
| 2013 | 1 / 8 | Conservative |
| 2017 | 0 / 8 | Conservative |
| 2021 | 0 / 8 | Conservative |
