= Clacton in the 2024 United Kingdom general election =

Election to the House of Commons in the Clacton constituency

2024 United Kingdom general election in Clacton
- 4 July 2024

Clacton constituency
- Turnout: 58.7%
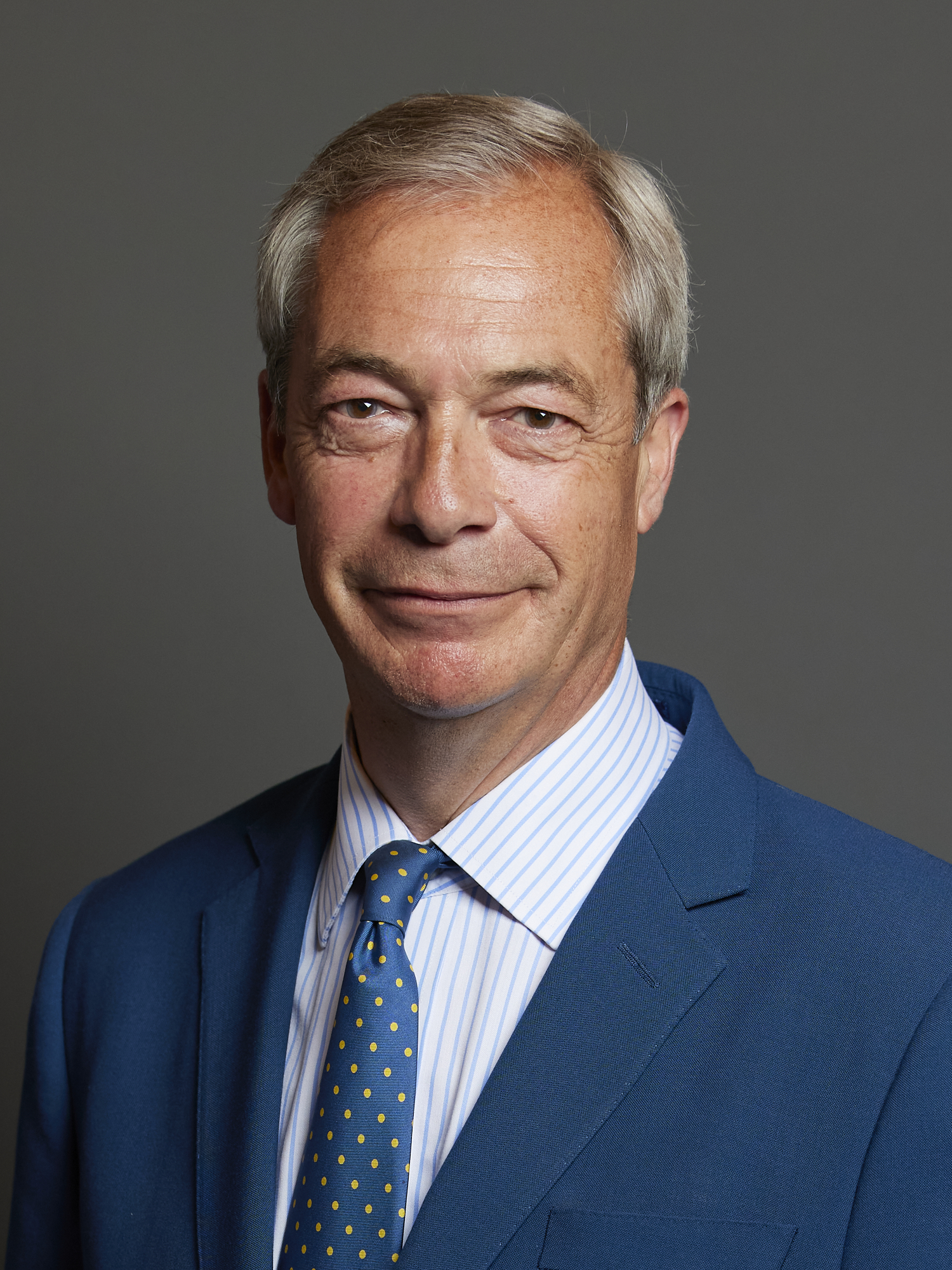

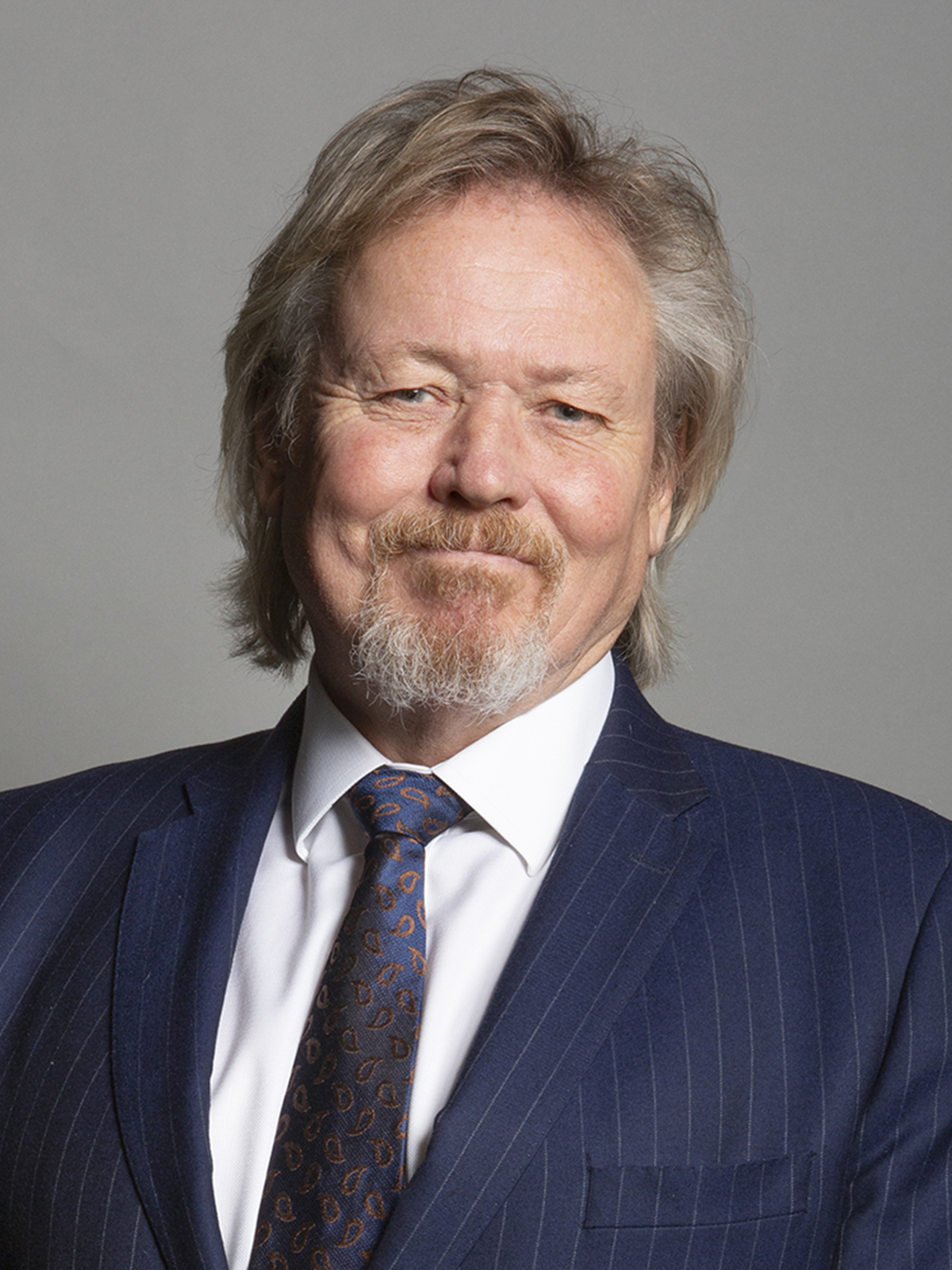

	First party	Second party	Third party
Candidate	Nigel Farage	Giles Watling	Jovan Owusu-Nepaul
Party	Reform	Conservative	Labour
Popular vote	21,225	12,820	7,448
Percentage	46.2%	27.9%	16.2%
Swing	New	▼44.0 pp	▲0.6 pp
MP before election
Giles Watling
Conservative
Elected MP
Nigel Farage
Reform

An election took place in the Essex constituency of Clacton on 4 July 2024, as part of the 2024 general election. Nigel Farage, the newly re-appointed leader of Reform UK and the former leader of the UK Independence Party, won the election with 46.2% of the vote and successfully entered Parliament after seven previous attempts. As the "figurehead of the country's populist right", Farage brought Clacton to international attention.

== Background ==
In the leadup to the 2024 general election, Clacton was defined as part of the "sea wall", coastal constituencies in Great Britain as a battleground in the general election.

The constituency is based on the Essex town of Clacton-on-Sea, located on the North Sea east coast of England. The constituency also includes the towns of Frinton-on-Sea and Walton-on-the-Naze. The village of Jaywick is noted for high levels of deprivation and poverty. 46.8% of over-16s were unemployed, with work typically being seasonal.

Despite being historically a strong Conservative area, the Harwich constituency elected a Labour MP in 1997 and 2001. The 2014 Clacton by-election saw the election of the first ever UK Independence Party Member of Parliament. In the 2016 European Union membership referendum, Clacton strongly backed Brexit.

== Candidates ==
In May 2023, Clacton's Conservative MP, Giles Watling, was reselected in a vote by local party members to become Conservative candidate for the 2024 general election, despite the local executive voting to not automatically select him.

Nigel Farage had previously been leader of UKIP and the Brexit Party and there had been speculation about what sort of role he would perform in the 2024 general election. At a news conference on 3 June 2024, Farage announced both his intention to become leader of Reform UK and his candidature for the party in the Clacton constituency. This was Farage's eighth attempt to be elected to the House of Commons. Immediately prior to Farage's announcement, Reform UK had been predicted to win no MPs in the 2024 election.

Clacton had been won by UKIP's Douglas Carswell in 2014, but was more recently held by the Conservative Party's Giles Watling, who had not been a supporter of Brexit. Watling was standing for re-election for the Conservatives in the constituency, defending the majority of almost 25,000 he had won at the previous election.

Former taxi driver Tony Mack was selected in October 2023 as the Reform candidate for Clacton. He was allegedly removed after promises from Farage to compensate him for his costs and give him a paid job if Farage won the election. Within days, Mack said he felt "ostracised" and, on 8 June, announced he would stand in the election as an independent candidate.

Labour's candidate was Jovan Owusu-Nepaul, a trade unionist and policy officer for the all-party parliamentary group for reuniting Britain post-Brexit.

The Green Party candidate, Natasha Osben, had previously stood in Clacton for the Labour Party but had left in 2019 and believed the Greens were "the only party that is genuinely committed" to bringing about change.

Local businessman and councillor, Matthew Bensilum, was standing for the Liberal Democrats.

Former member of Reform UK and the Conservative Party, Tasos Papanastasiou, stood in the election for the Heritage Party, citing disagreements about vaccine roll-outs and peace efforts in the Middle East.

Farage's former party, UKIP, nominated former Tendring District Councillor Andrew Pemberton as their candidate under the ballot description as UKIP - Stop Illegal Immigration. UKIP's former MP for Clacton, Douglas Carswell, endorsed Nigel Farage despite the previous disagreements among themselves.

CNN described Clacton as "the front line of Britain's migration debate".

== Campaign ==
On his first day of campaigning in Clacton-on-Sea, Farage had a banana milkshake thrown over him by a member of the crowd. A 25-year-old woman was arrested on suspicion of assault. Farage appeared to make a joke about the incident later in the day, when he appeared in front of the media in the village of Jaywick with a tray of milkshakes.

On 19 June, the anti-Brexit group Best for Britain argued that Labour were in the best position to stop Reform UK winning the constituency, as an Electoral Calculus poll showed Labour had jumped above the Conservatives into second place in the race.

During the campaign, the Labour Party's candidate Jovan Owusu-Nepaul was criticised for a past comment he had made on X (formerly Twitter), in which he had responded to a comment talking about "white man tears" with: "My favourite drink." Owusu-Nepaul told PoliticsHome: "They were comments made before I put myself forward for election. Prior to that I was a private citizen. Of course, I would never use such language as an elective representative." He claimed that the comments had not been an issue when they had been brought up in person, saying: "This area is full of white men. When it's been raised with me, they literally just scoff at it. It's not a deal. People recognise tongue in cheek."

On 27 June, it was reported that Labour Party had ordered Owusu-Nepaul to leave Clacton and help the party campaign in the West Midlands instead. Owusu-Nepaul had built a reputation on social media of being "the best dressed candidate in living memory", and it was believed Labour were cross that he was getting more attention than the Labour leader, Sir Keir Starmer. Starmer denied Labour had given up in Clacton.

On the same day, an undercover Channel 4 journalist secretly recorded members of Farage's campaign team using language described by the BBC as "racist, Islamophobic and homophobic", also suggesting refugees should be used as "target practice". In a statement, Farage said that he was "dismayed" at the "reprehensible" language.

Reform chairman Richard Tice said that racist comments were "inappropriate". Farage later accused Channel 4 of a "set-up", stating that one of the canvassers, Andrew Parker, had been an actor. Farage stated that Parker had been "acting from the moment he came into the office", and cited video of Parker performing "rough-speaking" from his acting website. Channel 4 denied that Parker was known to them prior to the report. Regarding other members of his campaign team, Farage stated that the individuals in question had "watched England play football, they were in the pub, they were drunk, it was crass."

On 2 July, it was reported that Owusu-Nepaul was "in tears" over being told to "never come back" to the Clacton campaign, and that the Labour Party had taken a donation intended expressly for Owusu-Nepaul's campaign, despite the campaign presence being halted.

== Opinion polling ==
Dates conducted	Pollster	Client	Sample size	Con	Lab	LD	Grn	Ref	Others	Lead
4 Jul 2024	2024 general election		–	27.9%	16.2%	4.4%	4.2%	46.2%	3.4%	18.3
10–19 Jun 2024	JL Partners	Friderichs Advisory Partners	502	21%	18%	6%	6%	48%	1%	27
11–13 Jun 2024	Survation	Arron Banks	506	27%	24%	2%	5%	42%	1%	15
9–12 Jan 2024	Survation (Note: Poll conducted based on the previous boundaries for this constituency, not the boundaries used at the general election)	Arron Banks	509	38%	30%	6%	–	18%	9%	8
9–12 Jan 2024	Survation	Arron Banks	509	27%	23%	6%	–	37% (Note: With Nigel Farage as candidate; this poll was conducted before his candidacy was declared.)	8%	10
12 Dec 2019	2019 general election (Note: Notional result)		–	71.9%	15.6%	6.2%	2.9%	–	3.4%	56.3

== Results ==
General election 2024: Clacton
Party	Candidate	Votes	%	±%
Reform	Nigel Farage	21,225	46.2	N/A
Conservative	Giles Watling	12,820	27.9	−44.0
Labour	Jovan Owusu-Nepaul	7,448	16.2	+0.6
Liberal Democrats	Matthew Bensilum	2,016	4.4	−1.8
Green	Natasha Osben	1,935	4.2	+1.3
Independent	Tony Mack (Note: Mack was originally announced as the Reform UK candidate, but was de-selected in favour of Nigel Farage, and subsequently ran as an independent.)	317	0.7	N/A
UKIP	Andrew Pemberton	116	0.3	N/A
Climate	Craig Jamieson	48	0.1	N/A
Heritage	Tasos Papanastasiou	33	0.1	N/A
Majority		8,405	18.3	
Turnout		45,958	58.7	−2.6
Rejected ballots		111	0.2	
Registered electors		78,245		
Reform gain from Conservative		Swing	+45.1	

== Previous result ==
General election 2019: Clacton
Party	Candidate	Votes	%	±%
Conservative	Giles Watling	31,438	72.3	+11.1
Labour	Kevin Bonavia	6,736	15.5	−9.9
Liberal Democrats	Callum Robertson	2,541	5.8	+3.8
Green	Chris Southall	1,225	2.8	+1.2
Independent	Andy Morgan	1,099	2.5	N/A
Independent	Colin Bennett	243	0.6	N/A
Monster Raving Loony	Just-John Sexton	224	0.5	N/A
Majority		24,702	56.8	+21.0
Turnout		43,506	61.3	−2.4
Conservative hold		Swing	+10.5	

== See also ==
- 2014 Clacton by-election
