= Giles Watling =

British actor and politician (born 1953)

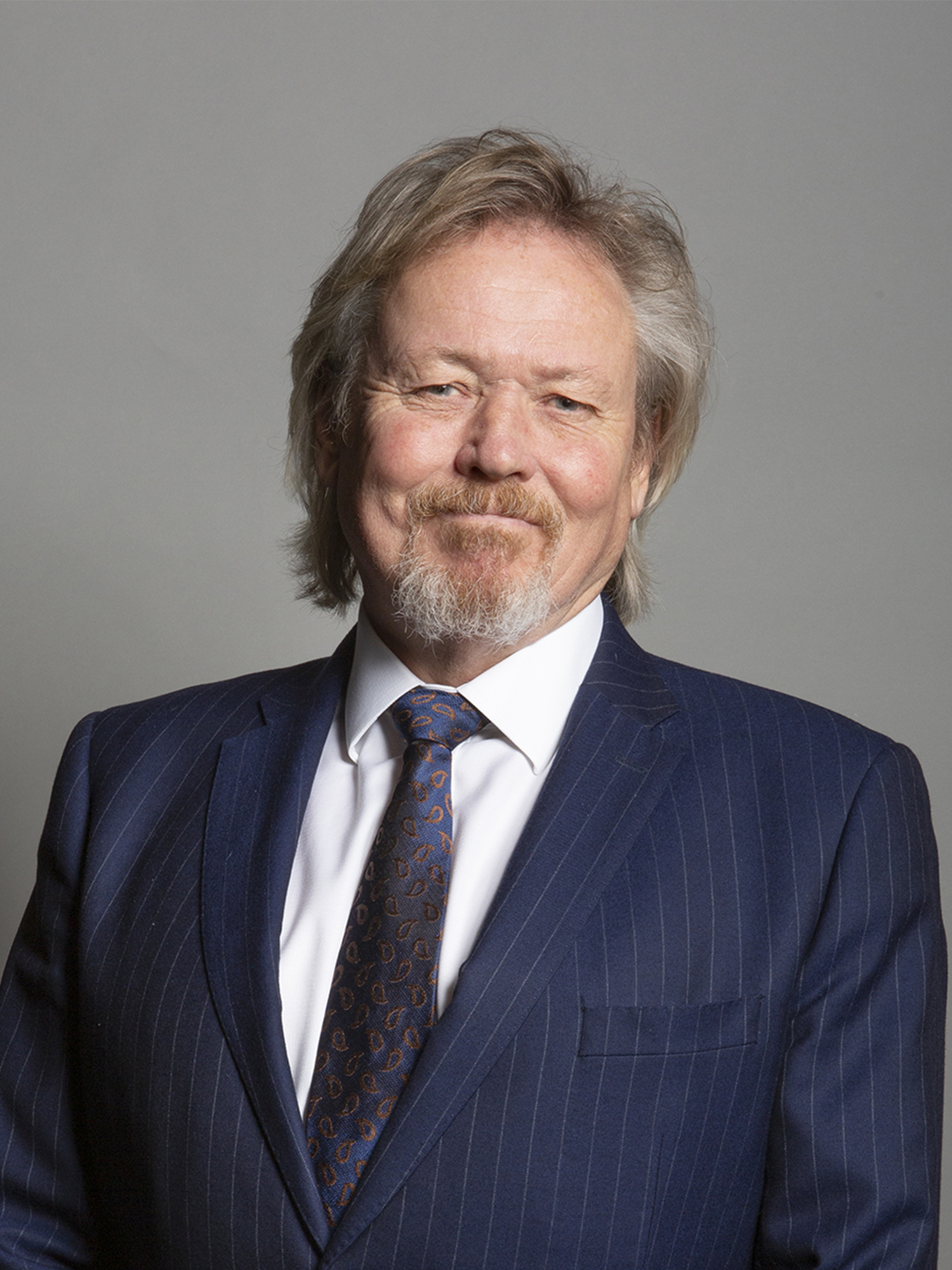
- Official portrait, 2019

Member of Parliament for Clacton
- In office 8 June 2017 – 30 May 2024
- Preceded by: Douglas Carswell
- Succeeded by: Nigel Farage

Personal details
- Born: Giles Francis Watling; 18 February 1953 (age 73) Chingford, Essex, England
- Party: Conservative
- Spouse: Vanda Brinkworth (m. 1979)
- Parent: Jack Watling (father)
- Relatives: Deborah Watling (sister); Dilys Watling (maternal half-sister)
- Education: Forest School, Walthamstow
- Occupation: Actor; politician

Giles Francis Watling (born 18 February 1953) is a British actor and Conservative politician, who served as the Member of Parliament (MP) for Clacton from 2017 until 2024, losing his seat to Reform UK leader Nigel Farage. He previously stood for the seat in its by-election in 2014, losing to former Conservative turned UKIP member Douglas Carswell. Prior to entering politics he was an actor, appearing in British theatre and television productions, including portraying the vicar Oswald in Carla Lane's sitcom Bread from 1988 to 1991.

== Early life and education ==
Giles Watling was born on 18 February 1953 in Chingford, London. His parents Patricia Hicks and Jack Watling were actors. Watling was privately educated at Forest School, Walthamstow.

== Acting career ==
Watling has worked extensively in British theatre and on television, and is probably best known for his portrayal of the vicar Oswald in Carla Lane's series Bread. He has also directed several UK touring theatre productions, and took on the role of Bob in the UK tour of Priscilla, Queen of the Desert in 2013. Watling serves on the board of directors of the Royal Theatrical Fund, a charity which aids those who have professionally practised or contributed to the theatrical arts.

== Political career ==
=== Tendring District Councillor ===
Watling served as a Conservative councillor for Frinton ward on Tendring District Council from the 2007 election until 2016.

=== Member of Parliament ===
On 10 September 2014 Watling was shortlisted in the Conservatives' open primary at Clacton to select the party's candidate for the Clacton by-election and was adopted following a public meeting on 11 September 2014. At the by-election, Watling came second with 24.6% of the vote behind the incumbent UK Independence Party (UKIP) MP Douglas Carswell, who previously served as a Conservative but left that party and joined UKIP earlier in 2014.

At the 2015 general election, Watling again contested Clacton as the Conservative candidate, coming second behind Douglas Carswell, who won 44.4% of the vote.

Watling was elected to Parliament as MP for Clacton at the snap 2017 general election, at which Carswell chose to retire, with 61.2% of the vote and a majority of 15,828. He was returned as MP for Clacton at the 2019 general election with an increased vote share of 72.3% and an increased majority of 24,702.

Following an interim report on the connections between colonialism and properties now in the care of the National Trust, including links with historic slavery, Watling was among the signatories of a letter to The Daily Telegraph in November 2020 by the Common Sense Group of Conservative parliamentarians, which accused the National Trust of being "coloured by cultural Marxist dogma, colloquially known as the 'woke agenda'".

Watling lost his seat in the 2024 general election to Reform UK candidate and leader Nigel Farage.

== Post-parliamentary career ==
Following his defeat at the 2024 UK General Election, Walting told PoliticsHome that he would "retire from politics" and suggested he might "go back to showbiz", but in the meantime he would "take it easy, do a bit of gardening, and get to know my wife properly again".

== Filmography ==
Year	Title	Role	Notes
1965	Gideon's Way	Malcolm Gideon	8 episodes
1974	Upstairs, Downstairs	2nd Lt. James Marriott	1 episode
1978	You're Only Young Twice	PC Henry	1 episode
1979	The Human Factor	Colin	
1979–1980	How's Your Father?	Martin Matthews	13 episodes
1980	Keep It in the Family	Young man	1 episode
1984	No Place Like Home	Maurice	1 episode
1988–1991	Bread	Oswald	49 episodes
1992	'Allo 'Allo!	Major Twistleton-Smythe	1 episode
1997	Melissa	Gangster at Airport	1 episode
1999	Grange Hill	Mr. Radcliffe	1 episode
2001	The Tutankhamun Conspiracy	Howard Carter	TV movie
2012	Run for Your Wife	Man in pub	

== Personal life ==
Watling is the younger brother of the actress Deborah Watling and younger half-brother of actress Dilys Watling.

Watling married Vanda Brinkworth in 1979.

Watling is a member of the Garrick Club, Frinton Cricket Club, Walton and Frinton Yacht Club and Frinton War Memorial Club.

Parliament of the United Kingdom
Preceded by Douglas Carswell	Member of Parliament for Clacton; 2017–2024	Succeeded by Nigel Farage
