= Ivan Henderson =

British politician (born 1958)

Cllr Ivan Henderson

Labour Group Leader on Essex County Council
- In office May 2016 – May 2026
- Deputy: Michael Danvers (2016–2017); Julie Young (2017–2021); Adele Brown (2021–2023); Lee Scordis (2023–2026)
- Preceded by: Julie Young
- Succeeded by: Lee Scordis

Essex County Councillor for Harwich
- In office 2 May 2013 – 8 May 2026
- Preceded by: Ricky Callender
- Succeeded by: Linda McKenzie

Member of Parliament for Harwich
- In office 1 May 1997 – 11 April 2005
- Preceded by: Iain Sproat
- Succeeded by: Douglas Carswell

Tendring District Councillor for Harwich and Kingsway Harwich East (1995–2019)
- Incumbent
- Assumed office 5 May 2011
- Preceded by: Lawrie Payne
- In office 4 May 1995 – 1 May 1997
- Preceded by: F Good
- Succeeded by: Lawrie Payne

Personal details
- Born: 7 June 1958 (age 68)
- Party: Labour
- Spouse: Jo Henderson

Ivan John Henderson (born 7 June 1958) is a Labour Party politician in the United Kingdom. He was the Member of Parliament (MP) for Harwich from 1997 to 2005, and member of Essex County Council for Harwich from 2013 to 2026.

== Early life ==
Henderson attended the Sir Anthony Deane Comprehensive, now known as the Harwich and Dovercourt High School.

Henderson was previously a Harwich Town Councillor and Tendring District Councillor. He was a stevedore for Harwich International Port. He became a trade union official.

== Parliamentary career ==
When elected in 1997, Henderson was Harwich's first Labour MP. He had expected to finish third in votes, and had to tell his dock manager that he could not work a scheduled shift.

In Parliament Henderson was a Parliamentary Private Secretary at the Home Office, the Office of the Deputy Prime Minister, the Department for Work and Pensions, and the Treasury. He worked closely with Gordon Brown, then the Chancellor of the Exchequer, until he lost his seat to the Conservative Douglas Carswell in the 2005 general election. In the 2010 general election Henderson contested the Clacton constituency, aside from the town of Harwich itself, which contained much of the former constituency of Harwich, however he was unsuccessful.

Ivan Henderson continues to play an active role in local politics, acting as the Labour Party's spokesman for Harwich and Clacton. Recent work includes the Kirby Cross Sports Pavilion, where funding that was obtained by Tendring District Council came about through Henderson's discussions with the Football Association. When it came to be opened, Ivan managed to secure a visit from Richard Caborn MP. He also successfully campaigned for Trinity House HQ to remain in Harwich, he was later reelected to his former East Ward on the Town and District council.

== Post-parliamentary career ==
Boundary changes saw the old Harwich constituency reconstituted into the new Harwich and North Essex and Clacton constituencies. Henderson was selected to contest the Clacton seat for the 2010 general election. In the election Henderson polled 25% of the vote, putting him more than 12,000 votes behind Carswell.

After this unsuccessful parliamentary comeback, Henderson was elected to Tendring District Council in 2011, winning Harwich East ward in his hometown.

In 2013 he was elected as an Essex County Councillor for Harwich, unseating the incumbent Conservative Ricky Callender. He later became the leader of the Labour Group on both councils. He was re-elected to Essex County Council in 2017 and 2021.

In 2021 Henderson became Mayor of Harwich, and said he was extremely "proud" to have done so, saying that now he has been a representative at all levels, he feels that "he has completed the set".

In 2026, Henderson lost his Harwich seat on Essex County Council to Linda McKenzie of Reform UK. He was succeeded by Lee Scordis as leader of the county council Labour group.

== Personal life ==
From his first marriage, he has one son and a daughter; from his second marriage he has one son. He married Jo'Anne Atkinson on 13 June 1992. His children are Joseph Henderson, Stuart Henderson and Melissa Henderson.

His wife is also a member of Tendring District Council.

Parliament of the United Kingdom
Preceded by Iain Sproat	Member of Parliament for Harwich; 1997–2005	Succeeded by Douglas Carswell
