= Tendring District Council elections =

Local government elections in Essex, England

Tendring District Council in Essex, England is elected every four years.

== Council elections ==
| Year | Conservative | Labour | Liberal Democrats (Note: Includes totals for the predecessors of the Liberal Democrats, the Liberal Party and SDP (both of which participated in the Alliance).) | UKIP | Reform | Tendring First | Community Rep. | Independents & Others | Council control after election |
|---|---|---|---|---|---|---|---|---|---|
Local government reorganisation; council established (60 seats)
| 1973 | 31 | 11 | 4 | – | – | – | – | 14 | Conservative |
New ward boundaries
| 1976 | 39 | 3 | 5 | – | – | – | – | 13 | Conservative |
| 1979 | 39 | 4 | 7 | – | – | – | – | 10 | Conservative |
| 1983 | 32 | 8 | 8 | – | – | – | – | 12 | Conservative |
| 1987 | 33 | 4 | 15 | – | – | – | – | 8 | Conservative |
| 1991 | 18 | 11 | 20 | – | – | – | – | 11 (Note: Including 4 Residents Association) | No overall control |
| 1995 | 8 | 37 | 7 | 0 | – | – | – | 8 (Note: Including 4 Residents Association) | Labour |
| 1999 | 16 | 23 | 9 | 0 | – | – | – | 12 (Note: Including 3 Residents Association) | No overall control |
New ward boundaries
| 2003 | 25 | 11 | 13 | 0 | – | – | 4 | 7 (Note: Including 3 Residents Association) | No overall control |
| 2007 | 28 | 6 | 6 | 0 | – | 10 | 5 | 5 (Note: Including 2 Residents Association) | No overall control |
| 2011 | 33 | 9 | 2 | 0 | – | 8 | – | 8 (Note: Including 3 Residents Association) | Conservative |
| 2015 | 23 | 4 | 1 | 22 | – | 1 | – | 9 (Note: Including 3 Residents Association) | No overall control |
New ward boundaries; seats decreased from 60 to 47
| 2019 | 16 | 6 | 2 | 5 | – | 4 | – | 15 (Note: Including 3 Residents Association, 1 Foundation) | No overall control |
| 2023 | 19 | 8 | 4 | 0 | 0 | 1 | – | 16 | No overall control |
| Current (Note: Updated 18 January 2026) | 13 | 7 | 4 | 0 | 7 | 1 | – | 16 | No overall control |

== Results maps ==
=== Seat maps ===
1976 results map

1979 results map

1983 results map

1987 results map

1991 results map

1995 results map

1999 results map

2003 results map

2007 results map

2011 results map

2015 results map

2019 results map

2023 results map

=== Other results maps ===
2003 results map

2007 results map

2011 results map

2015 results map

== By-election results ==
A by-election occurs when seats become vacant between council elections. Below is a summary of by-elections from 1983 onwards. Full by-election results are listed under the last regular election preceding the by-election and can be found by clicking on the ward name.

=== 1983-1994 ===
| Ward | Date | Incumbent party | Winning party |
|---|---|---|---|
| Southcliff | 29 September 1983 | Conservative | Conservative |
| St James | 3 May 1984 | Conservative | Conservative |
| Mistley | 20 September 1984 | Conservative | Alliance |
| Walton | 1 November 1984 | Conservative | Conservative |
| Great & Little Oakley | 28 March 1985 | Conservative | Labour |
| Holland & Kirby | 29 May 1986 | Residents | Alliance |
| Lawford & Manningtree | 15 October 1987 | Conservative | Labour |
| Great & Little Oakley | 22 December 1988 | Conservative | SLD |
| Great Bentley | 4 May 1989 | Conservative | SLD |
| Ardleigh | 4 May 1989 | Conservative | Conservative |
| St Mary's | 15 June 1989 | SLD | Labour |
| St Mary's | 5 April 1990 | SLD | SLD |
| Walton | 7 June 1990 | Conservative | Labour |
| Rush Green | 6 February 1992 | Conservative | Labour |
| Southcliff | 18 February 1993 | Liberal Democrats | Conservative |
| Harwich West | 18 March 1993 | Labour | Labour |
| St John's | 6 May 1993 | Liberal Democrats | Liberal Democrats |
| Walton | 2 December 1993 | Conservative | Conservative |
| Alresford, Thorrington & Frating | 5 May 1994 | Liberal Democrats | Liberal Democrats |
| St Bartholomews | 19 May 1994 | Residents | Independent |
| Lawford & Manningtree | 22 September 1994 | Conservative | Labour |

=== 1995-2006 ===
| Ward | Date | Incumbent party | Winning party |
|---|---|---|---|
| Elmstead | 16 November 1995 | Conservative | Conservative |
| Harwich West Central | 18 April 1996 | Labour | Labour |
| Haven | 21 November 1996 | Residents | Independent |
| St James | 10 July 1997 | Labour | Conservative |
| Harwich East | 2 October 1997 | Labour | Labour |
| Rush Green | 20 July 2000 | Labour | Labour |
| St Mary's | 19 April 2001 | Labour | Labour |
| Brightlingsea East | 2 August 2001 | Labour | Liberal Democrats |
| St Bartholomews | 29 November 2001 | Independent | Independent |
| Alresford, Thorrington & Frating | 7 March 2002 | Labour | Liberal Democrats |
| St John's | 13 June 2002 | Liberal Democrats | Liberal Democrats |
| Pier | 22 July 2004 | Conservative | Conservative |
| Thorrington, Frating, Elmstead & Great Bromley | 20 January 2005 | Conservative | Conservative |

=== 2007-2018 ===
| Ward | Date | Incumbent party | Winning party |
|---|---|---|---|
| Burrsville | 24 September 2009 | Conservative | Conservative |
| Golf Green | 8 April 2010 | Community Rep. | Labour |
| St Bartholomews | 22 March 2012 | Residents | Residents |
| St Bartholomews | 16 August 2012 | Residents | Residents |
| Harwich West | 28 March 2013 | Labour | Labour |
| St James | 26 September 2013 | Conservative | Conservative |
| Peter Bruff | 6 February 2014 | Conservative | Conservative |
| St John's | 6 February 2014 | Conservative | Conservative |
| Manningtree, Mistley, Little Bentley & Tendring | 3 July 2014 | Conservative | Conservative |
| Rush Green | 6 July 2015 | UKIP | UKIP |
| St Paul's | 5 May 2016 | UKIP | UKIP |
| Great & Little Oakley | 9 February 2017 | Independent | UKIP |
| St James | 6 April 2017 | UKIP | Conservative |
| St Paul's | 15 February 2018 | UKIP | Conservative |

=== 2019-present ===
| Ward | Date | Incumbent party | Winning party |
|---|---|---|---|
| Eastcliff | 6 May 2021 | Residents | Independent |
| West Clacton & Jaywick Sands | 6 May 2021 | UKIP | Conservative |
| Bluehouse | 11 January 2024 | Labour | Independent |
| The Bentleys & Frating | 6 February 2025 | Conservative | Reform |
| Frinton | 6 June 2025 | Conservative | Reform |
