= 2003 Tendring District Council election =

2003 UK local government election

← 1999	1 May 2003	2007 →

All 60 seats to Tendring District Council 31 seats needed for a majority

	First party	Second party	Third party
Party	Conservative	Liberal Democrats	Labour
Last election	17 seats, 33.3%	9 seats, 14.2%	23 seats, 37.6%
Seats before	17	11	21
Seats won	25	13	11
Seat change	▲9	▲4	▼14
Popular vote	12,898	7,503	7,503
Percentage	36.0%	21.7%	21.0%
Swing	▲2.7%	▲7.5%	▼12.3%
	Fourth party	Fifth party	Sixth party
Party	Community Rep.	Independent	Residents
Last election	did not exist	6 seats, 12.8%
Seats before	0	6
Seats won	4	4	3
Seat change	▲4	▼2	▲3
Popular vote	3,116	2,217	1,098
Percentage	8.7%	6.2%	3.1%
Swing	▲8.7%	▼6.6%	▲3.1%
- Results of the 2003 Tendring District Council election
Council control before election
No overall control
Council control after election
No overall control

Elections to Tendring District Council took place on 1 May 2003. This was on the same day as other local elections across the United Kingdom.

== Results summary ==
Tendring District Council election, 2003
Party	Seats	Gains	Losses	Net gain/loss	Seats %	Votes %	Votes	+/−
Conservative	25	0	0	▲9		36.0	12,898	+2.7
Liberal Democrats	13	4	0	▲4		21.7	7,766	+7.5
Labour	11	0	14	▼14		21.0	7,503	-12.3
Community Rep.	4	4	0	▲4		8.7	3,116	N/A
Independent	4	0	0	▼3		6.2	2,217	-6.6
Residents	3	0	0	Steady		3.1	1,098	N/A
Green	0	0	0	Steady		1.8	652	N/A
UKIP	0	0	0	Steady		0.9	326	N/A
Socialist Alliance	0	0	0	Steady		0.6	204	N/A

== Ward results ==
=== Alresford ===
Alresford
Party	Candidate	Votes	%
Liberal Democrats	Gary Scott*	413	75.2
Labour	Terry Ripo	136	24.8
Majority		277	50.4
Turnout		549	32.0
Registered electors		1,743	
Liberal Democrats win (new seat)			

=== Alton Park ===
Alton Park (2 seats)
Party	Candidate	Votes	%
Labour	Delia Aldis	330	44.3
Labour	Mark Morley-Souter*	299	40.1
Liberal Democrats	Graham Saltmarsh	207	27.8
Liberal Democrats	Kevin Mitchell	198	26.6
Conservative	Susan Powell	180	24.2
Conservative	Sheila Wilde	157	21.1
Turnout		~745	21.1
Registered electors		3,547	
Labour win (new seat)			
Labour win (new seat)			

=== Ardleigh & Little Bromley ===
Ardleigh & Little Bromley
Party	Candidate	Votes	%
Conservative	Neil Stock	370	78.1
Labour	Colin Olivier	104	21.9
Turnout			27.0
Conservative win (new seat)			

=== Beaumont & Thorpe ===
Beaumont & Thorpe
Party	Candidate	Votes	%	±%
Independent	Jose Powell	Unopposed		
Turnout				
Independent hold		Swing		

=== Bockings Elm ===
Bockings Elm (2 seats)
Party	Candidate	Votes	%	±%
Liberal Democrats	Harold Shearing*	757	71.1	+20.9
Liberal Democrats	Patricia Beadles	731	68.6	+21.3
Conservative	Grant Penny	274	25.7	+3.5
Conservative	David Cottage	236	22.2	+0.1
Turnout		~1,065	30.4	+6.1
Registered electors		3,503		
Liberal Democrats hold				
Liberal Democrats hold				

=== Bradfield, Wrabness & Wix ===
Bradfield, Wrabness & Wix
Party	Candidate	Votes	%	±%
Liberal Democrats	Mark de Roy	353	56.7	
Green	Michael Mealing	205	32.9	
Labour	Richard Exell	65	10.4	
Turnout			36.7	
Liberal Democrats hold		Swing		

=== Brightlingsea ===
Brightlingsea (3 seats)
Party	Candidate	Votes	%
Liberal Democrats	David Dixon*	1,034	47.6
Labour	Josephine Ruffell	1,023	47.1
Independent	Peter Patrick*	989	45.5
Liberal Democrats	Thomas Dale*	770	35.5
Conservative	Vivien Chapman	551	25.4
Conservative	Jane Girdlestone	542	25.0
Green	Valerie Bentinck	350	16.1
Turnout		~2,171	34.6
Registered electors		6,276	
Liberal Democrats win (new seat)			
Labour win (new seat)			
Independent win (new seat)			

=== Burrsville ===
Burrsville
Party	Candidate	Votes	%
Conservative	Charles Sambridge	336	51.5
Liberal Democrats	Walter Bensilum	317	48.5
Turnout			34.6
Conservative win (new seat)			

=== Frinton ===
Frinton (2 seats)
Party	Candidate	Votes	%	±%
Conservative	Edward Allen*	974	67.9	–12.9
Conservative	Nicholas Turner*	887	61.9	–18.1
UKIP	Anthony Finnegan-Butler	326	22.7	N/A
Liberal Democrats	Brian Whitson	164	11.4	N/A
Labour	Ann Evander	142	9.9	–9.2
Labour	Graham Ford	130	9.1	–9.0
Turnout		~1,434	41.3	+0.9
Registered electors		3,471		
Conservative hold				
Conservative hold				

=== Golf Green ===
Golf Green (2 seats)
Party	Candidate	Votes	%	±%
Community Rep.	Roy Smith*	1,135	76.9	N/A
Community Rep.	Kenneth Sargeant	651	44.1	N/A
Labour	Maurice Alexander*	491	33.3	–37.1
Conservative	Kenneth Spooner	231	15.6	–2.5
Turnout		~1,476	36.4	–3.7
Registered electors		4,056		
Community Rep. gain from Labour				
Community Rep. gain from Labour				

=== Great & Little Oakley ===
Great & Little Oakley
Party	Candidate	Votes	%	±%
Conservative	David Lines	228	41.3	
Labour	Graham Turner	215	38.9	
Community Rep.	Anthony Colbourne	109	19.7	
Turnout			32.2	
Conservative hold		Swing		

=== Great Bentley ===
Great Bentley
Party	Candidate	Votes	%	±%
Liberal Democrats	Robert Taylor	478	90.2	
Labour	Lily Jakubowski	52	9.8	
Turnout			30.7	
Liberal Democrats hold		Swing		

=== Hamford ===
Hamford (2 seats)
Party	Candidate	Votes	%
Conservative	Roy Caddick*	921	72.9
Conservative	Iris Johnson*	893	70.7
Labour	Valerie Bird	234	18.5
Liberal Democrats	Sheila Harrison	215	17.0
Turnout		~1,263	37.7
Registered electors		3,350	
Conservative win (new seat)			
Conservative win (new seat)			

=== Harwich East ===
Harwich East
Party	Candidate	Votes	%	±%
Labour	Lawrence Payne*	295	46.7	–12.0
Community Rep.	Michael Gardner	198	31.3	N/A
Conservative	Janet Little	100	15.8	–3.1
Socialist Alliance	Richard Allday	39	6.2	N/A
Majority		97	15.4	N/A
Turnout		535	32.8	+7.8
Registered electors		1,943		
Labour hold				

=== Harwich East Central ===
Harwich East Central (2 seats)
Party	Candidate	Votes	%	±%
Labour	Peter Brand*	499	44.6	–1.8
Conservative	William Bleakley*	492	44.0	–2.2
Labour	David McLeod	481	43.0	–1.9
Community Rep.	Fraser Leeks	315	28.2	N/A
Socialist Alliance	Sylvia Noble	85	7.6	N/A
Turnout		~1,119	30.8	+0.5
Registered electors		3,632		
Labour hold				
Conservative hold				

=== Harwich West ===
Harwich West (2 seats)
Party	Candidate	Votes	%	±%
Labour	Leslie Double*	613	52.0	–16.0
Labour	Hugh Markham-Lee	456	38.7	–24.5
Conservative	Eric Yallop	359	30.5	+12.8
Community Rep.	Ricardo Callender	329	27.9	N/A
Community Rep.	Hugh Thompson	256	21.7	N/A
Socialist Alliance	John Tipple	80	6.8	N/A
Turnout		~1,178	29.6	+4.9
Registered electors		3,980		
Labour hold				
Labour hold				

=== Harwich West Central ===
Harwich West Central (2 seats)
Party	Candidate	Votes	%	±%
Community Rep.	Steven Henderson	704	58.6	N/A
Community Rep.	David Rutson	607	50.5	N/A
Labour	Louise Armstrong*	386	32.1	–16.4
Labour	Colin Knight	386	32.1	–13.1
Conservative	Karoline Hlubek	233	19.4	–15.0
Turnout		~1,202	32.2	±0.0
Registered electors		3,734		
Community Rep. gain from Labour				
Community Rep. gain from Labour				

=== Haven ===
Haven
Party	Candidate	Votes	%	±%
Residents	Brian Thomasson	361	46.8	
Conservative	Joyce Broderick	296	38.4	
Independent	George Craft	114	14.8	
Turnout			42.2	
Residents gain from Independent		Swing		

=== Holland & Kirby ===
Holland & Kirby (2 seats)
Party	Candidate	Votes	%	±%
Conservative	Robert Bucke*	907	74.1	+14.5
Conservative	Mark Cossens	875	71.5	+17.1
Labour	Joan Bond	289	23.6	–10.2
Turnout		~1,223	33.2	+0.8
Registered electors		3,685		
Conservative hold				
Conservative hold				

=== Homelands ===
Homelands
Party	Candidate	Votes	%	±%
Conservative	Michael Page	Unopposed		
Turnout				
Conservative win (new seat)				

=== Lawford ===
Lawford (2 seats)
Party	Candidate	Votes	%
Conservative	Sarah Candy	452	49.6
Liberal Democrats	John Kelly	353	38.8
Conservative	Russell Ginn	287	31.5
Labour	Michael Barker	203	22.3
Labour	Gregory Morgan*	198	21.7
Community Rep.	David Smy	154	16.9
Turnout		~911	27.2
Registered electors		3,349	
Conservative win (new seat)			
Liberal Democrats win (new seat)			

=== Little Clacton & Weeley ===
Little Clacton & Weeley (2 seats)
Party	Candidate	Votes	%
Conservative	Peter de Vaux-Balbirnie*	617	61.3
Conservative	Bernard Leatherdale	578	57.4
Liberal Democrats	John Candler	309	30.7
Labour	Ronald Fluin	213	21.2
Turnout		~1,007	26.6
Registered electors		3,784	
Conservative win (new seat)			
Conservative win (new seat)			

=== Manningtree, Mistley, Little Bentley & Tendring ===
Manningtree, Mistley, Little Bentley & Tendring (2 seats)
Party	Candidate	Votes	%
Liberal Democrats	Michael Dew	547	49.9
Liberal Democrats	Graham Potter	511	46.7
Conservative	Alison Johnson	438	40.0
Conservative	Alistair Ford	403	36.8
Labour	Christine Morgan	154	14.1
Turnout		~1,095	32.6
Registered electors		3,360	
Liberal Democrats win (new seat)			
Liberal Democrats win (new seat)			

=== Peter Bruff ===
Peter Bruff (2 seats)
Party	Candidate	Votes	%
Liberal Democrats	Susan Shearing	485	65.8
Liberal Democrats	Pauline Bevan*	481	65.3
Conservative	John Stephenson	204	27.7
Conservative	Madeline Pound	184	25.0
Turnout		~737	21.4
Registered electors		3,443	
Liberal Democrats win (new seat)			
Liberal Democrats win (new seat)			

=== Pier ===
Pier (2 seats)
Party	Candidate	Votes	%
Conservative	Audrey Overton	357	47.2
Conservative	Ann Oxley	333	44.1
Labour	Anne Alexander	291	38.5
Labour	Raymond Rogers	291	38.5
Green	Marie Herbert	97	12.8
Turnout		~756	21.2
Registered electors		3,564	
Conservative win (new seat)			
Conservative win (new seat)			

=== Ramsey & Parkeston ===
Ramsey & Parkeston
Party	Candidate	Votes	%	±%
Labour	William Elmer	205	39.8	
Community Rep.	Michael Lowe	181	35.1	
Conservative	Andrew Purdy	129	25.0	
Turnout			27.8	
Labour hold		Swing		

=== Rush Green ===
Rush Green (2 seats)
Party	Candidate	Votes	%	±%
Labour	Clive Baker*	300	42.6	–15.6
Labour	Anthony Sargent	283	40.2	–15.4
Liberal Democrats	Robert Harper	224	31.8	+19.7
Liberal Democrats	Tracy King	217	30.8	N/A
Conservative	Helen Doddridge	198	28.1	–7.4
Turnout		~704	20.5	–3.5
Registered electors		3,435		
Labour hold				
Labour hold				

=== St Bartholomews ===
St Bartholomews (2 seats)
Party	Candidate	Votes	%	±%
Residents	Mary Bragg*	737	50.0	–25.9
Residents	Michael Holden	673	45.6	–24.7
Conservative	Claire Moor	640	43.4	N/A
Conservative	Brian Pennell	624	42.3	N/A
Turnout		~1,474	38.0	+3.8
Registered electors		3,880		
Residents hold				
Residents hold				

=== St. James ===
St. James (2 seats)
Party	Candidate	Votes	%	±%
Conservative	Christopher Griffiths	403	36.4	+6.9
Conservative	Gill Downing	384	34.7	+5.5
Liberal Democrats	Gloria Bargent	376	34.0	+21.7
Liberal Democrats	Charles Harrison*	253	22.8	N/A
Labour	David Bolton	249	22.5	–11.9
Independent	Martyn Hughes*	215	19.4	N/A
Labour	Roy Raby*	214	19.3	–14.6
Turnout		~1,107	32.6	+6.2
Registered electors		3,397		
Conservative gain from Ind. Conservative				
Conservative gain from Labour				

=== St Johns ===
St Johns (2 seats)
Party	Candidate	Votes	%	±%
Liberal Democrats	Robert Bevan*	577	53.6	+5.1
Liberal Democrats	Jeffrey Cripps	504	46.8	–0.9
Conservative	Anthony Cooper	326	30.3	+7.5
Conservative	Colin Madge	313	29.1	+6.4
Labour	Norman Jacobs	231	21.5	–8.3
Turnout		~1,076	29.3	+5.1
Registered electors		3,674		
Liberal Democrats hold				
Liberal Democrats hold				

=== St. Mary's ===
St. Mary's (2 seats)
Party	Candidate	Votes	%	±%
Labour	Kenneth Aldis	264	33.2	–15.5
Conservative	Amanda-Jane Pound	261	32.8	+3.4
Labour	Susan Morley-Souter*	251	31.6	–15.6
Conservative	Francis Woods	248	31.2	+3.3
Liberal Democrats	Peter Miller	246	30.9	+3.2
Liberal Democrats	Peter Redding	209	26.3	+1.7
Turnout		~795	21.3	–1.4
Registered electors		3,733		
Labour hold				
Conservative gain from Labour				

=== St. Osyth & Point Clear ===
St. Osyth & Point Clear (2 seats)
Party	Candidate	Votes	%	±%
Independent	John White*	680	61.0	+6.1
Independent	Michael Talbot*	655	58.8	+9.9
Conservative	Ronald Walker	366	32.9	N/A
Turnout		~1,114	30.1	–2.3
Registered electors		3,701		
Independent hold				
Independent hold				

=== St Pauls ===
St Pauls (2 seats)
Party	Candidate	Votes	%
Conservative	Pierre Oxley*	793	62.3
Conservative	Catherine Jessop*	701	55.1
Labour	David Gamman	239	18.8
Independent	Brian White	219	17.2
Liberal Democrats	Christine Jarvis	177	13.9
Liberal Democrats	Sylvia Smith	154	12.1
Turnout		~1,272	34.0
Registered electors		3,742	
Conservative win (new seat)			
Conservative win (new seat)			

=== Thorrington, Frating, Elmstead & Great Bromley ===
Thorrington, Frating, Elmstead & Great Bromley (2 seats)
Party	Candidate	Votes	%
Conservative	Ian Dimmock*	586	50.5
Conservative	Harry Jessop*	563	48.5
Liberal Democrats	Roger Bell	534	46.0
Liberal Democrats	Marc Mannings	502	43.3
Turnout		~1,160	31.4
Registered electors		3,695	
Conservative win (new seat)			
Conservative win (new seat)			

=== Walton ===
Walton (2 seats)
Party	Candidate	Votes	%	±%
Conservative	Jeanette King*	676	69.8	+3.7
Conservative	Christine Turner*	637	65.8	+0.8
Labour	Sacha Aldis	280	28.9	–3.5
Turnout		~968	28.4	–5.7
Registered electors		3,408		
Conservative hold				
Conservative hold				

== By-elections ==
=== Pier ===
Pier by-election: 22 July 2004
Party	Candidate	Votes	%	±%
Conservative		205	30.5	–17.4
Labour		154	22.9	–16.2
UKIP		109	16.2	N/A
Community Rep.		102	15.2	N/A
Liberal Democrats		102	15.2	N/A
Majority		51	7.6	N/A
Turnout		672	19.4	–1.8
Registered electors		3,464		
Conservative hold		Swing	▼0.6	

=== Thorrington, Frating, Elmstead & Great Bromley ===
Thorrington, Frating, Elmstead & Great Bromley by-election: 20 January 2005
Party	Candidate	Votes	%	±%
Conservative		577	55.1	+2.8
Liberal Democrats		345	33.0	–14.7
Labour		125	11.9	N/A
Majority		232	22.1	N/A
Turnout		1,047	28.5	–2.9
Registered electors		3,674		
Conservative hold		Swing	▲8.8	
