= 1991 Tendring District Council election =

1991 UK local government election

- 2 May 1991

All 60 seats to Tendring District Council 31 seats needed for a majority

	First party	Second party	Third party
Party	Liberal Democrats	Conservative	Labour
Last election	15 seats, 30.7%	33 seats, 42.7%	4 seats, 17.6%
Seats won	20	18	11
Seat change	▲5	▼15	▲7
Popular vote	26,221	30,808	20,886
Percentage	30.8%	36.2%	24.5%
Swing	▲0.1%	▼6.5%	▲6.9%
	Fourth party	Fifth party	Sixth party
Party	Independent	Residents	Ind. Conservative
Last election	2 seats, 2.2%	5 seats, 6.4%	1 seat, 0.4%
Seats won	5	4	2
Seat change	▲3	▼1	▲1
Popular vote	3,646	1,765	1,041
Percentage	4.3%	2.1%	1.2%
Swing	▲2.1%	▼4.3%	▲0.8%
- Winner of each seat at the 1991 Tendring District Council election.
Council control before election
Conservative
Council control after election
No overall control

The 1991 Tendring District Council election took place on 2 May 1991 to elect members of Tendring District Council in England. This was on the same day as other local elections.

At the election, the Liberal Democrats emerged as the largest party on the council for the first time since its creation in 1973. The Conservatives fell to second placed and Labour recovered their position to become the third largest party.

== Summary ==
=== Election result ===
1991 Tendring District Council election
Party	Seats	Gains	Losses	Net gain/loss	Seats %	Votes %	Votes	+/−
Liberal Democrats	20			▲5	33.3	30.8	26,221	+0.1
Conservative	18			▼15	30.0	36.2	30,808	–6.5
Labour	11			▲7	18.3	24.5	20,886	+6.9
Independent	5			▲3	8.3	4.3	3,646	+2.1
Residents	4			▼1	6.7	2.1	1,765	–4.3
Ind. Conservative	2			▲1	3.3	1.2	1,041	+0.8
Green	0			Steady	0.0	0.3	222	N/A

== Ward results ==
Below are the full results for the election.

=== Alresford, Thorrington & Frating ===
Alresford, Thorrington & Frating (2 seats)
Party	Candidate	Votes	%	±%
Liberal Democrats	D. Fitch*	873	53.8	+8.6
Liberal Democrats	J. Hayward*	786	48.4	+7.5
Conservative	P. Bates	518	31.9	–8.6
Conservative	R. Vosper	492	30.3	–5.8
Labour	J. Hickingbotham	319	19.7	+6.1
Turnout		~1,622	56.0	+3.2
Registered electors		2,897		
Liberal Democrats hold				
Liberal Democrats hold				

=== Ardleigh ===
Ardleigh
Party	Candidate	Votes	%	±%
Conservative	M. Robinson*	325	46.6	–10.2
Green	R. Watson	173	24.8	N/A
Liberal Democrats	B. Swinscoe	121	17.3	N/A
Labour	C. Hockley	79	11.3	–8.3
Majority		152	21.8	–11.4
Turnout		698	47.0	–1.9
Registered electors		1,496		
Conservative hold				

=== Beaumont & Thorpe ===
Beaumont & Thorpe
Party	Candidate	Votes	%	±%
Independent	J. Powell	355	50.4	N/A
Liberal Democrats	A. Newman	350	49.6	+15.7
Majority		5	0.7	N/A
Turnout		705	40.9	–0.4
Registered electors		1,736		
Independent hold				

=== Bockings Elm ===
Bockings Elm (2 seats)
Party	Candidate	Votes	%	±%
Liberal Democrats	D. Harper	1,825	54.8	–0.9
Liberal Democrats	O. Collard	1,808	54.2	–0.4
Conservative	D. Pearce	936	28.1	–5.9
Conservative	P. Vanner	914	27.4	–6.0
Labour	R. McKenny	448	13.4	+2.9
Labour	M. McKenny	446	13.4	+3.6
Turnout		~3,333	40.0	–5.6
Registered electors		8,333		
Liberal Democrats hold				
Liberal Democrats hold				

=== Bradfield, Wrabness & Wix ===
Bradfield, Wrabness & Wix
Party	Candidate	Votes	%	±%
Independent	R. McLaren	427	51.0	N/A
Conservative	J. Isaac	410	49.0	–3.0
Majority		17	2.0	N/A
Turnout		837	50.0	–2.5
Registered electors		1,678		
Independent gain from Conservative				

=== Brightlingsea East ===
Brightlingsea East (2 seats)
Party	Candidate	Votes	%	±%
Independent	P. Patrick*	849	54.5	+23.4
Liberal Democrats	T. Dale	694	44.6	+18.2
Labour	C. Olivier	516	33.1	+20.2
Conservative	R. Morgan*	510	32.7	+3.1
Turnout		~1,558	53.0	–8.3
Registered electors		2,939		
Independent hold				
Liberal Democrats gain from Conservative				

=== Brightlingsea West ===
Brightlingsea West (2 seats)
Party	Candidate	Votes	%	±%
Liberal Democrats	D. Dixon	724	51.6	+11.1
Independent	J. Partridge	589	42.0	N/A
Conservative	P. Coupland	557	39.7	–6.5
Labour	A. Olivier	432	30.8	+17.6
Turnout		~1,402	47.0	–9.5
Registered electors		2,984		
Liberal Democrats hold				
Independent gain from Conservative				

=== Elmstead ===
Elmstead
Party	Candidate	Votes	%	±%
Conservative	L. Parrish*	488	51.9	–12.9
Labour	T. Laughton	224	23.8	–11.4
Liberal Democrats	N. Ford	179	19.0	N/A
Green	C. Fox	49	5.2	N/A
Majority		264	28.1	–1.5
Turnout		940	49.0	+3.1
Registered electors		1,903		
Conservative hold		Swing	▼0.8	

=== Frinton ===
Frinton (3 seats)
Party	Candidate	Votes	%	±%
Conservative	W. Shelton*	1,762	70.8	+4.0
Conservative	A. Finnegan-Butler*	1,660	66.7	+2.0
Conservative	E. Allen	1,658	66.6	+9.3
Liberal Democrats	J. Russell	712	28.6	–0.1
Labour	D. Enever	362	14.5	+5.4
Labour	G. Stevens	314	12.6	N/A
Labour	L. Stevens	263	10.6	N/A
Turnout		~2,489	48.9	–24.5
Registered electors		5,091		
Conservative hold				
Conservative hold				
Conservative hold				

=== Golf Green ===
Golf Green (2 seats)
Party	Candidate	Votes	%	±%
Labour	R. Smith*	1,077	60.4	+48.0
Labour	J. Fluin	835	46.8	N/A
Ratepayer	R. Druce	348	19.5	N/A
Conservative	P. Harding	345	19.3	–18.3
Conservative	F. Butler	339	19.0	N/A
Ratepayer	R. Finn	268	15.0	N/A
Liberal Democrats	A. Wallis	127	7.1	–5.4
Turnout		~1,784	48.0	–0.8
Registered electors		3,717		
Labour gain from Residents				
Labour gain from Conservative				

=== Great & Little Oakley ===
Great & Little Oakley
Party	Candidate	Votes	%	±%
Conservative	D. Wood	304	36.5	–11.7
Liberal Democrats	R. Holmes	276	33.2	+10.7
Labour	J. Besser	252	30.3	+1.0
Majority		28	3.4	–15.6
Turnout		832	51.6	–3.7
Registered electors		1,615		
Conservative hold		Swing	▼11.2	

=== Great Bentley ===
Great Bentley
Party	Candidate	Votes	%	±%
Liberal Democrats	R. Taylor*	571	65.5	+23.5
Conservative	G. Lord	301	34.5	–16.3
Majority		270	31.0	N/A
Turnout		872	49.6	–3.7
Registered electors		1,763		
Liberal Democrats gain from Conservative		Swing	▲19.9	

=== Great Bromley, Little Bromley & Little Bentley ===
Great Bromley, Little Bromley & Little Bentley
Party	Candidate	Votes	%	±%
Liberal Democrats	A. Elvin	282	52.6	N/A
Conservative	S. Pound	254	47.4	–30.5
Majority		28	5.2	N/A
Turnout		536	47.7	+6.5
Registered electors		1,125		
Liberal Democrats gain from Conservative				

=== Harwich East ===
Harwich East (2 seats)
Party	Candidate	Votes	%	±%
Ind. Conservative	F. Good*	551	47.0	N/A
Labour	E. Brand	504	43.0	+4.1
Labour	P. Newell	378	32.2	+1.1
Conservative	J. Rutson-Kemp	289	24.7	–19.5
Liberal Democrats	C. Townsend	271	23.1	+6.1
Turnout		~1,172	45.7	–16.1
Registered electors		2,565		
Ind. Conservative gain from Conservative				
Labour hold				

=== Harwich East Central ===
Harwich East Central (2 seats)
Party	Candidate	Votes	%	±%
Labour	P. Brand	575	44.5	+14.5
Conservative	W. Bleakley*	566	43.8	+3.0
Labour	P. Hale	516	40.0	+12.1
Conservative	D. Rutson-Kemp	474	36.7	+3.3
Liberal Democrats	K. Tully	289	22.4	–6.8
Turnout		~1,291	46.2	–7.4
Registered electors		2,794		
Labour gain from Conservative				
Conservative hold				

=== Harwich West ===
Harwich West (2 seats)
Party	Candidate	Votes	%	±%
Labour	R. Knight*	1,153	66.2	+20.2
Labour	W. Mixter	866	49.7	+21.8
Conservative	E. Yallop	670	38.5	+9.5
Turnout		~1,742	44.9	–12.2
Registered electors		3,879		
Labour hold				
Labour gain from Conservative				

=== Harwich West Central ===
Harwich West Central (2 seats)
Party	Candidate	Votes	%	±%
Labour	S. Henderson*	681	48.9	+14.9
Labour	D. Robson	535	38.4	+8.0
Conservative	J. Spall*	504	36.2	–0.4
Conservative	G. Wallington-Hayes	468	33.6	–0.2
Liberal Democrats	T. Booth	350	25.1	–4.4
Turnout		~1,392	50.0	–3.3
Registered electors		2,784		
Labour hold				
Labour gain from Conservative				

=== Haven ===
Haven (2 seats)
Party	Candidate	Votes	%	±%
Residents	J. Hewitt*	926	66.7	–16.6
Residents	E. Fone	839	60.4	–20.5
Conservative	V. Stone	445	32.0	N/A
Labour	W. Jefferson	125	9.0	+3.2
Labour	K. Sacre	117	8.4	N/A
Turnout		~1,389	51.0	–2.9
Registered electors		2,723		
Residents hold				
Residents hold				

=== Holland & Kirby ===
Holland & Kirby (2 seats)
Party	Candidate	Votes	%	±%
Independent	T. Oxborrow*	1,426	74.8	N/A
Conservative	H. Rickards	1,085	56.9	+19.3
Labour	C. Nimmo	351	18.4	+11.7
Labour	A. Rout	303	15.9	N/A
Turnout		~1,908	42.8	–13.9
Registered electors		4,457		
Independent gain from Liberal Democrats				
Conservative hold				

=== Lawford & Manningtree ===
Lawford & Manningtree (2 seats)
Party	Candidate	Votes	%	±%
Labour	L. Randall*	816	42.0	+4.9
Conservative	D. Pallett*	684	35.2	–5.9
Liberal Democrats	D. Kelly	628	32.3	+10.5
Labour	N. Harbach	588	30.3	–0.5
Conservative	R. Streames	487	25.1	–12.0
Liberal Democrats	G. Potter	427	22.0	+0.7
Turnout		~1,944	48.7	–6.9
Registered electors		3,991		
Labour gain from Conservative				
Conservative hold				

=== Little Clacton ===
Little Clacton
Party	Candidate	Votes	%	±%
Ind. Conservative	P. De-Vaux Balbirnie*	490	56.3	+8.0
Liberal Democrats	J. Barry	380	43.7	N/A
Majority		110	12.6	+2.6
Turnout		870	38.9	+4.2
Registered electors		2,293		
Ind. Conservative hold				

=== Mistley ===
Mistley
Party	Candidate	Votes	%	±%
Liberal Democrats	R. Smith*	502	57.0	+17.1
Labour	F. Fairhall	196	22.3	–13.6
Conservative	S. Smith	182	20.7	–3.6
Majority		306	34.8	+30.8
Turnout		880	52.3	–3.6
Registered electors		1,687		
Liberal Democrats hold		Swing	▲15.4	

=== Ramsey & Parkeston ===
Ramsey & Parkeston
Party	Candidate	Votes	%	±%
Labour	W. Elmer*	Unopposed		
Registered electors		1,744		
Labour hold				

=== Rush Green ===
Rush Green (3 seats)
Party	Candidate	Votes	%	±%
Labour	C. Baker	696	37.9	+3.9
Conservative	I. Powell	696	37.9	–1.1
Conservative	M. Amos*	689	37.5	–0.5
Conservative	G. Downing	649	35.3	–1.3
Labour	G. Mills	639	34.8	+2.2
Labour	C. Poulton	626	34.1	+2.5
Liberal Democrats	A. McCormack	345	18.8	+3.0
Liberal Democrats	M. Lonsdale	337	18.3	N/A
Liberal Democrats	D. Rhodes	318	17.3	N/A
Independent	C. Humphrey	62	3.4	–7.7
Turnout		1,837	44.0	–7.2
Registered electors		4,174		
Labour gain from Conservative				
Conservative hold				
Conservative hold				

=== Southcliff ===
Southcliff (3 seats)
Party	Candidate	Votes	%	±%
Liberal Democrats	M. Jay	898	44.1	+14.5
Conservative	J. Molyneaux*	894	43.9	–12.5
Conservative	C. Jessop*	878	43.1	–11.9
Liberal Democrats	B. White	857	42.1	N/A
Liberal Democrats	I. Barker	848	41.7	N/A
Conservative	L. King	794	43.1	–11.9
Labour	J. Bond	234	11.5	–2.5
Labour	I. Jefferson	172	8.5	N/A
Labour	A. Parlour	167	8.2	N/A
Turnout		~2,035	49.0	–0.8
Registered electors		4,154		
Liberal Democrats gain from Conservative				
Conservative hold				
Conservative hold				

=== St Bartholomews ===
St Bartholomews (2 seats)
Party	Candidate	Votes	%	±%
Residents	J. Cole	Unopposed		
Residents	A. Tovey	Unopposed		
Registered electors		2,849		
Residents hold				
Residents hold				

=== St James ===
St James (3 seats)
Party	Candidate	Votes	%	±%
Liberal Democrats	D. Tunstill*	799	42.7	+4.9
Conservative	A. Overton*	769	41.1	–1.9
Conservative	R. Gladwin	695	37.1	–4.3
Conservative	J. Spreadbury	670	35.8	+0.9
Liberal Democrats	J. Robdrup	644	34.4	N/A
Liberal Democrats	B. Kear	620	33.1	N/A
Labour	K. Frost	325	17.4	–1.9
Labour	M. Newman	318	17.0	–1.9
Labour	W. Dunne	296	15.8	N/A
Turnout		~1,872	39.0	–5.9
Registered electors		4,799		
Liberal Democrats hold				
Conservative hold				
Conservative hold				

=== St Johns ===
St Johns (3 seats)
Party	Candidate	Votes	%	±%
Liberal Democrats	P. Bevan*	2,220	78.4	+17.1
Liberal Democrats	W. Bensilum*	2,020	71.3	+13.4
Liberal Democrats	P. Manning*	1,978	69.9	+14.1
Conservative	V. Franklin	425	15.0	–14.2
Conservative	P. Harmer	376	13.3	–13.1
Labour	S. Morley	296	10.5	+1.0
Labour	M. Souter	259	9.1	–0.2
Labour	S. Parlour	256	9.0	+0.1
Turnout		~2,832	51.0	–3.3
Registered electors		5,552		
Liberal Democrats hold				
Liberal Democrats hold				
Liberal Democrats hold				

=== St Marys ===
St Marys (3 seats)
Party	Candidate	Votes	%	±%
Liberal Democrats	M. Bargent*	916	56.7	+17.1
Liberal Democrats	P. Miller*	856	53.0	+14.3
Liberal Democrats	J. Duke	842	52.1	+19.9
Labour	A. Mason	387	24.0	–6.3
Labour	N. Jacobs	379	23.5	+9.4
Labour	P. Ahern	374	23.2	+9.3
Conservative	J. Brittain	276	17.1	+0.6
Conservative	A. Harmer	258	16.0	+0.6
Conservative	J. Stephenson	242	15.0	N/A
Turnout		~1,615	40.0	–20.4
Registered electors		4,038		
Liberal Democrats hold				
Liberal Democrats hold				
Liberal Democrats hold				

=== St Osyth & Point Clear ===
St Osyth & Point Clear (2 seats)
Party	Candidate	Votes	%	±%
Liberal Democrats	P. Hendy	953	61.7	+13.4
Liberal Democrats	J. White	810	52.4	+22.7
Conservative	P. Amos	632	40.9	–1.4
Conservative	R. Yaxley-Wilde	537	34.7	N/A
Turnout		~1,546	50.0	–4.7
Registered electors		3,091		
Liberal Democrats hold				
Liberal Democrats gain from Conservative				

=== Tendring & Weeley ===
Tendring & Weeley
Party	Candidate	Votes	%	±%
Liberal Democrats	M. De Roy	399	52.1	+41.6
Conservative	C. Lumber*	367	47.9	–25.8
Majority		32	4.2	N/A
Turnout		766	41.5	+6.5
Registered electors		1,852		
Liberal Democrats gain from Conservative		Swing	▲33.7	

=== Walton ===
Walton (3 seats)
Party	Candidate	Votes	%	±%
Conservative	D. Hall*	1,410	54.9	–7.1
Conservative	D. Aldrich	1,362	53.1	–8.4
Conservative	M. Page*	1,338	52.1	–9.2
Labour	P. Lawes	1,091	42.5	+28.3
Labour	J. Bird	1,036	40.4	N/A
Labour	B. Theadom	978	38.1	N/A
Turnout		~2,566	47.7	–2.9
Registered electors		5,379		
Conservative hold				
Conservative hold				
Conservative hold				

== By-elections ==
=== Rush Green ===
Rush Green by-election: 6 February 1992
Party	Candidate	Votes	%	±%
Labour		509	36.0	–2.7
Conservative		484	34.3	–4.4
Liberal Democrats		373	26.4	+7.2
Independent		47	3.3	N/A
Majority		25	1.7	N/A
Turnout		1,413	33.9	–10.1
Registered electors		4,168		
Labour gain from Conservative		Swing	▲0.9	

=== Southcliff ===
Southcliff by-election: 18 February 1993
Party	Candidate	Votes	%	±%
Conservative		730	51.0	+6.9
Liberal Democrats		459	32.1	–12.2
Labour		207	14.5	+3.0
Other		36	2.5	N/A
Majority		271	18.9	N/A
Turnout		1,432	32.9	–16.1
Registered electors		4,353		
Conservative gain from Liberal Democrats		Swing	▲9.6	

=== Harwich West ===
Harwich West by-election: 18 March 1993
Party	Candidate	Votes	%	±%
Labour		512	46.5	–16.7
Conservative		343	31.2	–5.6
Liberal Democrats		246	22.3	N/A
Majority		169	15.3	N/A
Turnout		1,101	28.8	–16.1
Registered electors		3,823		
Labour hold		Swing	▼5.6	

=== St Johns ===
St Johns by-election: 6 May 1993
Party	Candidate	Votes	%	±%
Liberal Democrats		1,243	58.0	–17.5
Labour		476	22.2	+12.1
Conservative		425	19.8	+5.3
Majority		767	35.8	N/A
Turnout		2,144	38.6	–12.4
Registered electors		5,554		
Liberal Democrats hold		Swing	▼14.8	

=== Walton ===
Walton by-election: 2 December 1993
Party	Candidate	Votes	%	±%
Conservative		619	39.3	–17.1
Labour		551	34.9	–8.7
Liberal Democrats		407	25.8	N/A
Majority		68	4.4	N/A
Turnout		1,577	29.3	–18.4
Registered electors		5,382		
Conservative hold		Swing	▼4.2	

=== Alresford, Thorrington & Frating ===
Alresford, Thorrington & Frating by-election: 5 May 1994
Party	Candidate	Votes	%	±%
Liberal Democrats		538	37.9	–13.2
Labour		495	34.9	+16.2
Conservative		386	27.2	–3.1
Majority		43	3.0	N/A
Turnout		1,419	49.2	–6.8
Registered electors		2,884		
Liberal Democrats hold		Swing	▼14.7	

=== St Batholomews ===
St Bartholomews by-election: 19 May 1994
Party	Candidate	Votes	%	±%
Independent		726	54.6	N/A
Labour		346	26.0	N/A
Conservative		132	9.9	N/A
Liberal Democrats		125	9.4	N/A
Majority		380	28.6	N/A
Turnout		1,329	46.6	N/A
Registered electors		2,852		
Independent gain from Residents				

=== Lawford & Manningtree ===
Lawford & Manningtree by-election: 22 September 1994
Party	Candidate	Votes	%	±%
Labour		650	46.4	+8.1
Liberal Democrats		398	28.4	–1.1
Conservative		352	25.1	–7.0
Majority		252	18.0	N/A
Turnout		1,400	35.0	–13.7
Registered electors		4,000		
Labour gain from Conservative		Swing	▲4.6	
