= 1983 Tendring District Council election =

1983 UK local government election

- 5 May 1983

All 60 seats to Tendring District Council 31 seats needed for a majority

	First party	Second party	Third party
Party	Conservative	Labour	Alliance
Last election	39 seats, 55.0%	4 seats, 18.5%	7 seats, 11.5%
Seats won	32	8	8
Seat change	▼7	▲4	▲1
Popular vote	32,136	15,905	15,783
Percentage	42.8%	21.2%	21.0%
Swing	▼12.2%	▲2.7%	▲9.5%
	Fourth party	Fifth party
Party	Residents	Independent
Last election	4 seats, 7.1%	5 seats, 7.4%
Seats won	8	4
Seat change	▲4	▼1
Popular vote	5,499	4,595
Percentage	7.3%	6.1%
Swing	▲0.2%	▼1.3%
- Winner of each seat at the 1983 Tendring District Council election.
Council control before election
Conservative
Council control after election
Conservative

The 1983 Tendring District Council election took place on 5 May 1983 to elect members of Tendring District Council in England. This was the same day as other local elections held across the United Kingdom.

== Summary ==
=== Election result ===
1983 Tendring District Council election
Party	Seats	Gains	Losses	Net gain/loss	Seats %	Votes %	Votes	+/−
Conservative	32			▼7	53.3	42.8	32,136	–12.2
Labour	8			▲4	13.3	21.2	15,905	+2.7
Alliance	8			▲1	13.3	21.0	15,783	+9.5
Residents	8			▲4	13.3	7.3	5,499	+0.2
Independent	4			▼1	6.7	6.1	4,595	–1.3
Ind. Conservative	0			Steady	0.0	1.5	1,091	N/A
Independent Labour	0			▼1	0.0	0.0	0	–0.5

== Ward results ==
=== Arlesford, Thorrington & Frating ===
Arlesford, Thorrington & Frating
Party	Candidate	Votes	%	±%
Conservative	R. Lord	569	44.9	N/A
Conservative	P. Lynch	528	41.7	N/A
Alliance	D. Fitch*	496	39.1	N/A
Alliance	J. Hayward	393	31.0	N/A
Labour	D. Munson	202	15.9	N/A
Labour	M. Deal	193	15.2	N/A
Turnout		~1,267	45.7	N/A
Registered electors		2,772		
Conservative gain from Independent				
Conservative hold				

=== Ardleigh ===
Ardleigh
Party	Candidate	Votes	%	±%
Conservative	D. Jiggens	426	58.5	–21.9
Labour	B. Stapleton	302	41.5	+21.9
Majority		124	17.0	–43.8
Turnout		728	48.9	–27.9
Registered electors		1,489		
Conservative hold		Swing	▼21.9	

=== Beaumont & Thorpe ===
Beaumont & Thorpe
Party	Candidate	Votes	%	±%
Independent	M. Wright*	529	87.4	+1.7
Labour	L. Rogers	76	12.6	–1.7
Majority		453	74.9	+3.4
Turnout		605	38.0	–34.6
Registered electors		1,592		
Independent hold		Swing	▲1.7	

=== Bockings Elm ===
Bockings Elm (2 seats)
Party	Candidate	Votes	%	±%
Conservative	M. Fitz*	1,133	48.5	–10.2
Conservative	B. Failes	1,127	48.2	–6.5
Alliance	G. Wheatley	740	31.7	N/A
Alliance	G. Lievesley	468	20.0	N/A
Labour	D. Cubbin	466	19.9	–21.5
Turnout		~2,336	37.0	–29.4
Registered electors		6,314		
Conservative hold				
Conservative hold				

=== Bradfield, Wrabness & Wix ===
Bradfield, Wrabness & Wix
Party	Candidate	Votes	%	±%
Conservative	D. Coggins	581	70.6	+2.3
Labour	G. Crask	242	29.4	–2.3
Majority		339	41.2	+4.7
Turnout		824	51.6	–25.7
Registered electors		1,596		
Conservative hold		Swing	▲2.3	

=== Brightlingsea East ===
Brightlingsea East
Party	Candidate	Votes	%	±%
Independent	P. Patrick*	814	43.8	
Alliance	C. House*	751	40.4	
Labour	R. Kitchen	296	15.9	
Labour	B. Westover	210	11.3	
Turnout		~1,861	66.4	
Registered electors		2,802		
Independent hold				
Alliance hold				

=== Brightlingsea West ===
Brightlingsea West (2 seats)
Party	Candidate	Votes	%	±%
Alliance	B. Stephens*	593	36.1	–15.5
Alliance	E. Price*	526	32.0	–18.1
Conservative	B. Pingree	415	25.3	–3.3
Independent	M. Herbert	325	19.8	N/A
Labour	A. Turner	308	18.8	–1.0
Labour	L. McClean	256	15.6	N/A
Turnout		~1,642	57.0	–24.5
Registered electors		2,880		
Alliance hold				
Alliance hold				

=== Elmstead ===
Elmstead
Party	Candidate	Votes	%	±%
Conservative	L. Parrish*	598	66.8	+6.5
Labour	J. Goldsbrough	297	33.2	–6.5
Majority		301	33.6	+13.0
Turnout		895	48.2	–31.8
Registered electors		1,855		
Conservative hold		Swing	▲6.5	

=== Frinton ===
Frinton (3 seats)
Party	Candidate	Votes	%	±%
Conservative	W. Shelton	1,467	86.2	+16.5
Conservative	E. Rex*	1,434	84.3	+17.6
Conservative	H. Major	1,372	80.7	+17.5
Labour	G. Robb	233	13.7	+1.6
Turnout		~1,701	40.6	–39.1
Registered electors		4,189		
Conservative hold				
Conservative hold				
Conservative hold				

=== Golf Green ===
Golf Green (2 seats)
Party	Candidate	Votes	%	±%
Residents	R. Druge	591	46.4	+11.2
Residents	R. Finn	467	36.6	+5.7
Conservative	J. Hill*	419	32.9	–10.6
Conservative	D. Holmes	336	26.4	–12.3
Labour	F. Saul	152	11.9	–9.4
Alliance	J. Lievesley	114	8.9	N/A
Turnout		~1,275	42.9	–30.3
Registered electors		2,972		
Residents gain from Conservative				
Residents gain from Conservative				

=== Great & Little Oakley ===
Great & Little Oakley
Party	Candidate	Votes	%	±%
Conservative	S. Mann	312	47.1	+6.5
Alliance	B. Fawcett	178	26.8	N/A
Labour	L. Mason	173	26.1	N/A
Majority		267	20.2	N/A
Turnout		796	45.8	–26.8
Registered electors		1,449		
Conservative gain from Independent Labour				

=== Great Bentley ===
Great Bentley
Party	Candidate	Votes	%	±%
Conservative	G. Lord*	445	57.7	+0.3
Alliance	R. Taylor	250	32.4	+1.0
Labour	P. Cunningham	76	9.9	–1.3
Majority		195	25.3	–0.7
Turnout		771	45.5	–30.4
Registered electors		1,694		
Conservative hold		Swing	▼0.4	

=== Great Bromley, Little Bromley & Little Bentley ===
Great Bromley, Little Bromley & Little Bentley
Party	Candidate	Votes	%	±%
Conservative	S. Pound	342	65.8	–5.2
Labour	S. Cooper	178	34.2	+5.2
Majority		164	31.5	–10.4
Turnout		520	48.8	–25.9
Registered electors		1,066		
Conservative hold		Swing	▼5.2	

=== Harwich East ===
Harwich East (2 seats)
Party	Candidate	Votes	%	±%
Conservative	F. Good*	725	44.0	
Labour	K. Todd	418	25.4	
Labour	D. Harris	417	25.3	
Independent	L. Brown	296	18.0	
Alliance	M. Gochin	209	12.7	
Alliance	Y. Baker	185	11.2	
Turnout		~1,648	65.1	
Registered electors		2,532		
Conservative hold				
Labour gain from Alliance				

=== Harwich East Central ===
Harwich East Central (2 seats)
Party	Candidate	Votes	%	±%
Conservative	W. Bleakley	619	48.9	
Conservative	D. Rutson	487	38.5	
Alliance	D. Marshall	380	30.0	
Alliance	A. Peake	290	22.9	
Labour	V. Collins	267	21.1	
Labour	D. Bennett	258	20.4	
Turnout		~1,266	46.8	
Registered electors		2,706		
Conservative hold				
Conservative hold				

=== Harwich West ===
Harwich West (2 seats)
Party	Candidate	Votes	%	±%
Labour	R. Knight	672	42.3	+6.2
Alliance	P. Elleby	492	31.0	N/A
Labour	S. Henderson	484	30.5	N/A
Conservative	E. Yallop	424	26.7	–7.3
Conservative	L. Glenn*	415	26.1	–4.6
Alliance	J. Barrett	351	22.1	N/A
Turnout		~1,588	48.2	–33.7
Registered electors		3,294		
Labour hold				
Alliance gain from Conservative				

=== Harwich West Central ===
Harwich West Central (2 seats)
Party	Candidate	Votes	%	±%
Conservative	J. Spall	569	41.0	–15.8
Conservative	G. Hayes*	547	39.4	–11.8
Alliance	C. Booth	496	35.7	N/A
Alliance	D. Murrison	436	31.4	N/A
Labour	D. Robson	323	23.3	–19.9
Labour	L. Harris	320	23.0	N/A
Turnout		~1,389	48.7	–25.6
Registered electors		2,853		
Conservative hold				
Conservative hold				

=== Haven ===
Haven (2 seats)
Party	Candidate	Votes	%	±%
Residents	J. Hewitt*	Unopposed		
Residents	I. Fairbairn	Unopposed		
Registered electors		2,607		
Residents hold				
Residents hold				

=== Holland & Kirby ===
Holland & Kirby
Party	Candidate	Votes	%	±%
Residents	G. Reilly	874	45.2	N/A
Residents	L. Strover	699	36.2	N/A
Conservative	I. Divall*	641	33.2	–16.3
Conservative	R. Manson	449	23.2	–7.6
Alliance	J. Russell*	266	13.8	–20.5
Labour	R. Rowlands	152	7.9	–8.2
Turnout		~1,933	50.2	–36.6
Registered electors		3,851		
Residents gain from Conservative				
Residents gain from Alliance				

=== Lawford & Manningtree ===
Lawford & Manningtree (2 seats)
Party	Candidate	Votes	%	±%
Labour	L. Randall*	783	46.9	
Labour	R. Dunn	665	39.8	
Alliance	W. Gibbons	461	27.6	
Independent	D. Pallett	425	25.4	
Turnout		~1,670	59.1	
Registered electors		2,825		
Labour hold				
Labour gain from Conservative				

=== Little Clacton ===
Little Clacton
Party	Candidate	Votes	%	±%
Independent	A. Chappell*	468	85.7	N/A
Labour	M. Lee	78	14.3	–0.8
Majority		390	71.4	N/A
Turnout		546	29.2	–39.0
Registered electors		1,868		
Independent gain from Conservative				

=== Mistley ===
Mistley
Party	Candidate	Votes	%	±%
Conservative	T. Otho-Briggs	260	31.3	–7.9
Alliance	R. Smith	215	25.9	–11.1
Independent	R. Clements	184	22.2	N/A
Labour	J. Beer	171	20.6	–3.2
Majority		45	5.4	+3.3
Turnout		830	53.5	–24.9
Registered electors		1,551		
Conservative hold		Swing	▲1.6	

=== Ramsey & Parkeston ===
Ramsey & Parkeston
Party	Candidate	Votes	%	±%
Labour	W. Elmer	291	36.6	N/A
Independent	R. Wilkinson*	220	27.7	N/A
Conservative	V. Padfield	184	23.2	N/A
Alliance	G. Turner	99	12.5	N/A
Majority		71	8.9	N/A
Turnout		794	51.6	N/A
Registered electors		1,539		
Labour gain from Independent				

=== Rush Green ===
Rush Green (3 seats)
Party	Candidate	Votes	%	±%
Conservative	I. Powell*	750	37.1	–5.5
Conservative	A. Harmer	694	34.3	–6.6
Labour	F. Baker	528	26.1	–6.1
Alliance	R. Huse	502	24.8	N/A
Labour	P. Johnson	488	24.1	–5.3
Labour	L. Jacobs	482	23.8	N/A
Alliance	G. Morton Jones	410	20.3	N/A
Alliance	D. Tunstill	374	18.5	N/A
Independent	C. Humphrey	240	11.9	N/A
Turnout		~2,022	51.5	–30.2
Registered electors		3,926		
Conservative hold				
Conservative hold				
Labour gain from Conservative				

=== Southcliff ===
Southcliff (3 seats)
Party	Candidate	Votes	%	±%
Conservative	L. Cox*	1,064	45.6	–32.6
Conservative	C. Jessop	1,025	43.9	–34.0
Conservative	L. King*	969	41.5	–27.1
Alliance	A. Laird	584	25.0	N/A
Alliance	T. Jeffrey	551	23.6	N/A
Residents	T. McKean	468	20.0	N/A
Labour	J. Bond	221	9.5	–12.2
Turnout		2,337	58.8	–12.8
Registered electors		3,974		
Conservative hold				
Conservative hold				
Conservative hold				

=== St. Bartholomews ===
St. Bartholomews (2 seats)
Party	Candidate	Votes	%	±%
Residents	J. Cole*	1,221	90.5	+22.0
Residents	A. Gibbons	1,179	87.4	+21.7
Labour	L. Johnson	129	9.6	+4.1
Turnout		~1,349	48.8	–33.5
Registered electors		2,765		
Residents hold				
Residents hold				

=== St. James ===
St. James (3 seats)
Party	Candidate	Votes	%	±%
Conservative	A. Overton*	873	42.2	–20.8
Conservative	J. Pye*	805	38.9	–23.0
Conservative	J. Goldsmith*	717	34.7	–26.9
Ind. Conservative	G. Cook	545	26.4	N/A
Alliance	N. Coe	384	18.6	N/A
Alliance	A. Wallis	345	16.7	N/A
Labour	D. Lawder	265	12.8	–24.3
Labour	A. Markham-Lee	264	12.8	N/A
Labour	L. Markham-Lee	214	10.4	N/A
Turnout		~2,067	47.8	–11.5
Registered electors		4,324		
Conservative hold				
Conservative hold				
Conservative hold				

=== St Johns ===
St Johns (3 seats)
Party	Candidate	Votes	%	±%
Alliance	A. Bevan*	1,408	47.2	+9.0
Alliance	P. Manning	1,099	36.8	+6.2
Conservative	P. Pridmore	1,063	35.6	–0.3
Conservative	J. Warner	996	33.4	–2.3
Conservative	W. Ross	972	32.6	–1.0
Labour	N. Jacobs	513	17.2	–8.7
Labour	M. Souter	428	14.3	N/A
Labour	C. Troubman	409	13.7	N/A
Turnout		~2,986	56.4	–27.1
Registered electors		5,294		
Alliance hold				
Alliance gain from Conservative				
Conservative hold				

=== St Marys ===
St Marys (3 seats)
Party	Candidate	Votes	%	±%
Labour	R. Smith*	725	32.0	+7.1
Independent	D. Moody*	510	22.5	–9.5
Labour	S. Morley	422	18.6	–3.6
Labour	D. Teague	409	18.0	N/A
Conservative	K. Molyneux	400	17.6	–4.2
Alliance	R. Bevan	340	15.0	–6.4
Ind. Conservative	T. Staigl	294	13.0	N/A
Ind. Conservative	P. Vanner	252	11.1	N/A
Turnout		~2,269	60.1	–36.5
Registered electors		3,776		
Labour hold				
Independent hold				
Labour hold				

=== St Osyth & Point Clear ===
St Osyth & Point Clear (2 seats)
Party	Candidate	Votes	%	±%
Alliance	T. Dale*	650	38.2	
Alliance	P. Balbirnie	545	32.0	
Conservative	P. Wells	542	31.9	
Independent	J. Smith	509	29.9	
Turnout		1,701	62.2	
Registered electors		2,734		
Alliance hold				
Alliance gain from Conservative				

=== Tendring & Weeley ===
Tendring & Weeley
Party	Candidate	Votes	%	±%
Conservative	C. Lumber*	452	62.1	+2.9
Alliance	J. Johnson	202	27.7	–0.2
Labour	C. Cunningham	74	10.2	–2.6
Majority		250	34.3	+3.0
Turnout		728	38.7	–30.0
Registered electors		1,882		
Conservative hold		Swing	▲1.6	

=== Walton ===
Walton (3 seats)
Party	Candidate	Votes	%	±%
Conservative	E. Day*	1,355	51.1	–21.3
Conservative	A. Rayner*	1,322	49.8	–19.2
Conservative	M. Page	1,313	49.5	–18.9
Independent	C. Robb	825	31.1	N/A
Labour	P. Lawes	473	17.8	–9.8
Labour	M. Wilson	465	17.5	–9.8
Labour	J. Layton	436	16.4	–10.8
Turnout		~2,654	55.0	–10.4
Registered electors		4,826		
Conservative hold				
Conservative hold				
Conservative hold				

== By-elections ==
=== Southcliff ===
Southcliff by-election: 29 September 1983
Party	Candidate	Votes	%	±%
Conservative		611	50.5	+5.0
Alliance		451	37.3	+12.3
Labour		148	12.2	+2.7
Majority		160	13.2	N/A
Turnout		1,210		
Conservative hold		Swing	▼3.7	

No Residents Association candidate as previous (–20.0%).

=== St James ===
St James by-election: 3 May 1984
Party	Candidate	Votes	%	±%
Conservative		592	35.3	–6.9
Alliance		579	34.5	+15.9
Labour		327	19.5	+6.7
Other		180	10.7	N/A
Majority		13	0.8	N/A
Turnout		1,678		
Conservative hold		Swing	▼11.4	

No Independent Conservative candidate as previous (–26.4%).

=== Mistley ===
Mistley by-election: 20 September 1984
Party	Candidate	Votes	%	±%
Alliance		253	40.0	+14.1
Conservative		225	35.5	+4.2
Labour		155	24.5	+3.9
Majority		28	4.5	N/A
Turnout		633	39.3	–14.2
Registered electors		1,611		
Alliance gain from Conservative		Swing	▲5.0	

No Independent candidate as previous (–22.2%).

=== Walton ===
Walton by-election: 1 November 1984
Party	Candidate	Votes	%	±%
Conservative		1,049	63.8	+12.7
Other		371	22.6	N/A
Labour		224	13.6	–4.2
Majority		768	41.2	N/A
Turnout		1,644	33.0	–22.0
Registered electors		4,982		
Conservative hold				

No Independent candidate as previous (–31.1%).

=== Great & Little Oakley ===
Great & Little Oakley by-election: 28 March 1985
Party	Candidate	Votes	%	±%
Labour		294	41.1	+15.0
Conservative		280	39.1	–8.0
Other		142	19.8	N/A
Majority		14	2.0	N/A
Turnout		716	48.0	+2.2
Registered electors		1,492		
Labour gain from Conservative		Swing	▲11.5	

No SDP-Liberal candidate as previous (–26.8%).

=== Holland & Kirby ===
Holland & Kirby by-election: 29 May 1986
Party	Candidate	Votes	%	±%
Alliance		660	37.8	+24.0
Conservative		405	23.2	–10.0
Other		383	21.9	N/A
Independent		149	8.5	N/A
Labour		149	8.5	+0.6
Majority		255	14.6	N/A
Turnout		1,746	43.4	–6.8
Registered electors		4,023		
Alliance gain from Residents		Swing	▲17.0	
