= 1979 Tendring District Council election =

1979 UK local government election

- 3 May 1979

All 60 seats to Tendring District Council 31 seats needed for a majority

| | First party | Second party | Third party |
|---|---|---|---|
| Party | Conservative | Liberal | Independent |
| Last election | 39 seats, 52.0% | 5 seats, 11.0% | 9 seats, 9.4% |
| Seats won | 39 | 7 | 5 |
| Seat change | Steady | ▲2 | ▼4 |
| Popular vote | 60,980 | 12,788 | 8,224 |
| Percentage | 55.0% | 11.5% | 8.3% |
| Swing | ▲3.0% | ▲0.5% | ▼2.0% |
| | Fourth party | Fifth party | Sixth party |
| Party | Labour | Residents | Independent Labour |
| Last election | 3 seats, 20.9% | 4 seats, 6.3% | N/A |
| Seats won | 4 | 4 | 1 |
| Seat change | ▲1 | Steady | ▲1 |
| Popular vote | 20,498 | 7,880 | 529 |
| Percentage | ▼2.4% | 7.1% | 0.5% |
| Swing | | ▲0.8% | N/A |
- Winner of each seat at the 1979 Tendring District Council election.
Council control before election
Conservative
Council control after election
Conservative

The 1979 Tendring District Council election took place on 3 May 1979 to elect members of Tendring District Council in England. This was the same day as the 1979 general election and other local elections held across the United Kingdom.

== Summary ==
=== Election result ===
1979 Tendring District Council election
| Party | Seats | Gains | Losses | Net gain/loss | Seats % | Votes % | Votes | +/− |
|---|---|---|---|---|---|---|---|---|
| Conservative | 39 | | | Steady | 65.0 | 55.0 | 60,980 | +3.0 |
| Liberal | 7 | | | ▲2 | 11.7 | 11.5 | 12,788 | +0.5 |
| Independent | 5 | | | ▼4 | 8.3 | 7.4 | 8,224 | –2.0 |
| Labour | 4 | | | ▲1 | 6.7 | 18.5 | 20,498 | –2.4 |
| Residents | 4 | | | Steady | 6.7 | 7.1 | 7,880 | +0.8 |
| Independent Labour | 1 | | | ▲1 | 1.7 | 0.5 | 529 | N/A |

== Ward results ==
=== Alresford, Thorrington & Frating ===
Alresford, Thorrington & Frating (2 seats)
| Party | Candidate | Votes | % | ±% |
|---|---|---|---|---|
| Independent | D. Fitch* | Unopposed | | |
| Conservative | R. Grinstead* | Unopposed | | |
| Registered electors | | 2,606 | | |
| Independent hold | | | | |
| Conservative hold | | | | |

=== Ardleigh ===
Ardleigh
| Party | Candidate | Votes | % | ±% |
|---|---|---|---|---|
| Conservative | P. Moorhouse* | 884 | 80.4 | N/A |
| Labour | A. Chaplin | 216 | 19.6 | N/A |
| Majority | | 668 | 60.8 | N/A |
| Turnout | | 1,100 | 76.8 | N/A |
| Registered electors | | 1,432 | | |
| Conservative hold | | | | |

=== Beaumont & Thorpe ===
Beaumont & Thorpe
| Party | Candidate | Votes | % | ±% |
|---|---|---|---|---|
| Independent | M. Wright* | 991 | 85.7 | +3.0 |
| Labour | V. Reiser | 165 | 14.3 | –3.0 |
| Majority | | 826 | 71.4 | +6.0 |
| Turnout | | 1,156 | 72.6 | +27.9 |
| Registered electors | | 1,592 | | |
| Independent hold | | Swing | ▲3.0 | |

=== Bockings Elm ===
Bockings Elm (2 seats)
| Party | Candidate | Votes | % | ±% |
|---|---|---|---|---|
| Conservative | D. Holmes | 1,912 | 58.7 | –3.5 |
| Conservative | M. Fitz | 1,781 | 54.7 | –0.2 |
| Labour | D. Mills | 1,347 | 41.4 | +18.9 |
| Turnout | | ~3,257 | 66.4 | +24.0 |
| Registered electors | | 4,906 | | |
| Conservative hold | | | | |
| Conservative hold | | | | |

=== Bradfield, Wrabness & Wix ===
Bradfield, Wrabness & Wix
| Party | Candidate | Votes | % | ±% |
|---|---|---|---|---|
| Conservative | D. Turberville* | 817 | 68.3 | N/A |
| Labour | R. Smith | 380 | 31.7 | N/A |
| Majority | | 437 | 36.5 | N/A |
| Turnout | | 1,197 | 77.3 | N/A |
| Registered electors | | 1,548 | | |
| Conservative hold | | | | |

=== Brightlingsea East ===
Brightlingsea East (2 seats)
| Party | Candidate | Votes | % | ±% |
|---|---|---|---|---|
| Liberal | C. House* | 1,510 | | |
| Independent | P. Patrick* | 1,482 | | |
| Labour | J. Bowers | 468 | | |
| Turnout | | ? | ? | N/A |
| Registered electors | | 2,837 | | |
| Liberal hold | | | | |
| Independent hold | | | | |

=== Brightlingsea West ===
Brightlingsea West (2 seats)
| Party | Candidate | Votes | % | ±% |
|---|---|---|---|---|
| Liberal | B. Stephens* | 1,207 | 51.6 | +7.3 |
| Liberal | E. Price* | 1,171 | 50.1 | +9.8 |
| Conservative | B. Pingree | 668 | 28.6 | –6.9 |
| Labour | B. Diamond | 464 | 19.8 | –9.6 |
| Turnout | | ~2,338 | 81.5 | +36.8 |
| Registered electors | | 2,869 | | |
| Liberal hold | | | | |
| Liberal hold | | | | |

=== Elmstead ===
Elmstead
| Party | Candidate | Votes | % | ±% |
|---|---|---|---|---|
| Conservative | L. Parrish* | 799 | 60.3 | –12.7 |
| Labour | P. Smith | 527 | 39.7 | +12.7 |
| Majority | | 272 | 20.5 | –25.4 |
| Turnout | | 1,326 | 80.0 | +31.2 |
| Registered electors | | 1,658 | | |
| Conservative hold | | Swing | ▼12.7 | |

=== Frinton ===
Frinton (3 seats)
| Party | Candidate | Votes | % | ±% |
|---|---|---|---|---|
| Conservative | P. Leaman* | 2,339 | 69.7 | +0.4 |
| Conservative | M. Rex | 2,239 | 66.7 | +1.3 |
| Conservative | A. Morgan* | 2,121 | 63.2 | +4.7 |
| Independent | A. Wagman | 611 | 18.2 | N/A |
| Labour | P. Davies | 406 | 12.1 | N/A |
| Turnout | | ~3,355 | 79.7 | +36.5 |
| Registered electors | | 4,210 | | |
| Conservative hold | | | | |
| Conservative hold | | | | |
| Conservative hold | | | | |

=== Golf Green ===
Golf Green (2 seats)
| Party | Candidate | Votes | % | ±% |
|---|---|---|---|---|
| Conservative | P. Harding* | 964 | 43.5 | –25.2 |
| Conservative | J. Hill* | 857 | 38.7 | –28.4 |
| Residents | F. Clarke | 779 | 35.2 | N/A |
| Residents | E. Druce | 683 | 30.9 | N/A |
| Labour | F. Baker | 472 | 21.3 | –10.0 |
| Turnout | | ~2,214 | 73.2 | +33.3 |
| Registered electors | | 3,024 | | |
| Conservative hold | | | | |
| Conservative hold | | | | |

=== Great & Little Oakley ===
Great & Little Oakley
| Party | Candidate | Votes | % | ±% |
|---|---|---|---|---|
| Independent Labour | G. Turner | 529 | 50.6 | N/A |
| Conservative | S. Mann | 516 | 49.4 | N/A |
| Majority | | 13 | 1.2 | N/A |
| Turnout | | 1,045 | 72.6 | N/A |
| Registered electors | | 1,439 | | |
| Independent Labour gain from Conservative | | | | |

=== Great Bentley ===
Great Bentley
| Party | Candidate | Votes | % | ±% |
|---|---|---|---|---|
| Conservative | G. Lord* | 743 | 57.4 | –6.9 |
| Liberal | R. Taylor | 406 | 31.4 | –4.3 |
| Labour | J. Bartington | 145 | 11.2 | N/A |
| Majority | | 337 | 26.0 | –2.6 |
| Turnout | | 1,294 | 75.9 | +28.2 |
| Registered electors | | 1,705 | | |
| Conservative hold | | Swing | ▼1.3 | |

=== Great Bromley, Little Bromley & Little Bentley ===
Great Bromley, Little Bromley & Little Bentley
| Party | Candidate | Votes | % | ±% |
|---|---|---|---|---|
| Conservative | C. Pirie* | 565 | 71.0 | N/A |
| Labour | S. Cooper | 231 | 29.0 | N/A |
| Majority | | 334 | 42.0 | N/A |
| Turnout | | 899 | 74.7 | N/A |
| Registered electors | | 1,066 | | |
| Conservative hold | | | | |

=== Harwich East ===
Harwich East (2 seats)
| Party | Candidate | Votes | % | ±% |
|---|---|---|---|---|
| Conservative | F. Good* | 1,461 | | |
| Liberal | T. Walker | 732 | | |
| Conservative | J. Lindsey | 653 | | |
| Labour | W. Buckland | 582 | | |
| Turnout | | ? | ? | N/A |
| Registered electors | | 2,774 | | |
| Conservative hold | | | | |
| Liberal gain from Independent | | | | |

=== Harwich East Central ===
Harwich East Central (2 seats)
| Party | Candidate | Votes | % | ±% |
|---|---|---|---|---|
| Conservative | G. Potter* | 1,057 | | |
| Conservative | J. Thorn* | 906 | | |
| Labour | J. Self | 794 | | |
| Independent | W. Roberts | 762 | | |
| Turnout | | ? | ? | N/A |
| Registered electors | | 2,730 | | |
| Conservative hold | | | | |
| Conservative hold | | | | |

=== Harwich West ===
Harwich West (2 seats)
| Party | Candidate | Votes | % | ±% |
|---|---|---|---|---|
| Labour | A. Sharp | 901 | 36.1 | –13.4 |
| Conservative | J. Glenn | 849 | 34.0 | –17.6 |
| Conservative | W. Spencer | 766 | 30.7 | –16.4 |
| Independent | P. Elleby | 750 | 30.0 | N/A |
| Independent | J. Barrett | 549 | 22.0 | N/A |
| Turnout | | ~2,499 | 81.9 | +30.3 |
| Registered electors | | 3,051 | | |
| Labour hold | | | | |
| Conservative hold | | | | |

=== Harwich West Central ===
Harwich West Central (2 seats)
| Party | Candidate | Votes | % | ±% |
|---|---|---|---|---|
| Conservative | T. Wallington-Ruston* | 1,230 | 56.8 | –8.4 |
| Conservative | G. Hayes* | 1,108 | 51.2 | –8.1 |
| Labour | D. Self | 935 | 43.2 | +8.4 |
| Turnout | | ~2,164 | 74.3 | +33.6 |
| Registered electors | | 2,912 | | |
| Conservative hold | | | | |
| Conservative hold | | | | |

=== Haven ===
Haven (2 seats)
| Party | Candidate | Votes | % | ±% |
|---|---|---|---|---|
| Residents | C. Bufton* | 1,691 | 76.4 | +26.5 |
| Residents | J. Hewitt* | 1,588 | 71.8 | +28.4 |
| Conservative | C. Clowes | 360 | 16.3 | –12.4 |
| Labour | J. Bond | 162 | 7.3 | +0.6 |
| Turnout | | ~2,212 | 83.5 | +8.1 |
| Registered electors | | 2,649 | | |
| Residents hold | | | | |
| Residents hold | | | | |

=== Holland & Kirby ===
Holland & Kirby (2 seats)
| Party | Candidate | Votes | % | ±% |
|---|---|---|---|---|
| Conservative | J. Divall* | 1,549 | 49.5 | N/A |
| Liberal | J. Russell | 1,074 | 34.3 | N/A |
| Conservative | F. Rust* | 962 | 30.8 | N/A |
| Labour | N. Davis | 502 | 16.1 | N/A |
| Turnout | | ~3,127 | 86.8 | N/A |
| Registered electors | | 3,602 | | |
| Conservative hold | | | | |
| Liberal gain from Conservative | | | | |

=== Lawford & Manningtree ===
Lawford & Manningtree (2 seats)
| Party | Candidate | Votes | % | ±% |
|---|---|---|---|---|
| Labour | L. Randall* | 1,135 | | |
| Conservative | R. Fairley* | 939 | | |
| Labour | L. Wallis | 676 | | |
| Liberal | R. Smith | 665 | | |
| Turnout | | ? | ? | N/A |
| Registered electors | | 2,532 | | |
| Labour hold | | | | |
| Conservative hold | | | | |

=== Little Clacton ===
Little Clacton
| Party | Candidate | Votes | % | ±% |
|---|---|---|---|---|
| Conservative | A. Chappell* | 1,061 | 84.9 | N/A |
| Labour | J. Young | 189 | 15.1 | N/A |
| Majority | | 872 | 69.8 | N/A |
| Turnout | | 1,250 | 68.2 | N/A |
| Registered electors | | 1,832 | | |
| Conservative gain from Independent | | Swing | | |

=== Mistley ===
Mistley
| Party | Candidate | Votes | % | ±% |
|---|---|---|---|---|
| Conservative | H. French* | 443 | 39.2 | –1.3 |
| Liberal | L. Brown | 419 | 37.0 | +1.6 |
| Labour | A. Foster | 269 | 23.8 | –0.3 |
| Majority | | 24 | 2.1 | –2.9 |
| Turnout | | 1,131 | 78.4 | +30.3 |
| Registered electors | | 1,443 | | |
| Conservative hold | | Swing | ▼1.5 | |

=== Ramsey & Parkeston ===
Ramsey & Parkeston
| Party | Candidate | Votes | % | ±% |
|---|---|---|---|---|
| Independent | F. Wilkinson* | Unopposed | | |
| Registered electors | | 1,476 | | |
| Independent hold | | | | |

=== Rush Green ===
Rush Green (3 seats)
| Party | Candidate | Votes | % | ±% |
|---|---|---|---|---|
| Conservative | I. Powell | 1,392 | 42.6 | –0.8 |
| Conservative | J. Gasking* | 1,338 | 40.9 | +2.5 |
| Conservative | D. Sage | 1,326 | 40.5 | +4.4 |
| Labour | A. Markham-Lee | 1,052 | 32.2 | +1.7 |
| Labour | L. Markham-Lee | 962 | 29.4 | +2.2 |
| Independent | A. Jones | 827 | 25.3 | N/A |
| Turnout | | ~3,270 | 81.7 | +39.0 |
| Registered electors | | 4,003 | | |
| Conservative hold | | | | |
| Conservative hold | | | | |
| Conservative hold | | | | |

=== Southcliff ===
Southcliff (3 seats)
| Party | Candidate | Votes | % | ±% |
|---|---|---|---|---|
| Conservative | E. Herbert* | 2,209 | 78.2 | –3.5 |
| Conservative | L. Cox* | 2,201 | 77.9 | –2.2 |
| Conservative | L. King* | 1,937 | 68.6 | –4.5 |
| Labour | M. Lee | 613 | 21.7 | +3.4 |
| Turnout | | ~2,824 | 71.6 | +31.4 |
| Registered electors | | 3,944 | | |
| Conservative hold | | | | |
| Conservative hold | | | | |
| Conservative hold | | | | |

=== St Bartholomews ===
St Bartholomews (2 seats)
| Party | Candidate | Votes | % | ±% |
|---|---|---|---|---|
| Residents | M. Holloway* | 1,602 | 68.5 | +9.8 |
| Residents | J. Cole | 1,537 | 65.7 | +7.2 |
| Conservative | J. Stockman | 418 | 17.9 | –8.7 |
| Independent | G. Collins | 189 | 8.1 | +1.1 |
| Labour | A. Oswick | 128 | 5.5 | –2.2 |
| Turnout | | ~2,338 | 82.3 | +17.3 |
| Registered electors | | 2,841 | | |
| Residents hold | | | | |
| Residents hold | | | | |

=== St James ===
St James (3 seats)
| Party | Candidate | Votes | % | ±% |
|---|---|---|---|---|
| Conservative | J. Goldsmith* | 1,648 | 63.0 | –8.0 |
| Conservative | J. Pye | 1,620 | 61.9 | –6.5 |
| Conservative | A. Overton* | 1,613 | 61.6 | –5.0 |
| Labour | F. Saul | 970 | 37.1 | +8.0 |
| Turnout | | ~2,617 | 59.3 | +28.3 |
| Registered electors | | 4,413 | | |
| Conservative hold | | | | |
| Conservative hold | | | | |
| Conservative hold | | | | |

=== St Johns ===
St Johns (3 seats)
| Party | Candidate | Votes | % | ±% |
|---|---|---|---|---|
| Liberal | A. Bevan* | 1,555 | 38.2 | +12.2 |
| Conservative | B. Edwards* | 1,462 | 35.9 | +2.6 |
| Conservative | T. Baker | 1,455 | 35.7 | +6.9 |
| Conservative | T. Staigl* | 1,368 | 33.6 | N/A |
| Liberal | P. Manning | 1,247 | 30.6 | +7.3 |
| Labour | T. Larkin | 1,055 | 25.9 | +0.6 |
| Turnout | | ~4,072 | 83.5 | +35.7 |
| Registered electors | | 4,877 | | |
| Liberal hold | | | | |
| Conservative hold | | | | |
| Conservative hold | | | | |

=== St Marys ===
St Marys (3 seats)
| Party | Candidate | Votes | % | ±% |
|---|---|---|---|---|
| Independent | D. Moody* | 1,194 | 32.0 | –6.0 |
| Labour | R. Smith | 930 | 24.9 | –3.1 |
| Labour | S. Gilbert* | 830 | 22.2 | –3.8 |
| Conservative | T. Godfrey | 813 | 21.8 | N/A |
| Liberal | D. Rhodes* | 801 | 21.4 | –12.7 |
| Conservative | J. Stephenson | 782 | 21.8 | N/A |
| Liberal | W. Bensilum | 747 | 20.0 | N/A |
| Turnout | | ~3,737 | 96.6 | +51.5 |
| Registered electors | | 3,869 | | |
| Independent hold | | | | |
| Labour gain from Liberal | | | | |
| Labour hold | | | | |

=== St Osyth & Point Clear ===
St Osyth & Point Clear (2 seats)
| Party | Candidate | Votes | % | ±% |
|---|---|---|---|---|
| Conservative | H. Ashenden* | 963 | | |
| Liberal | T. Dale | 905 | | |
| Independent | J. Smith* | 869 | | |
| Conservative | G. Roberts | 508 | | |
| Labour | M. Diamond | 233 | | |
| Turnout | | ? | ? | N/A |
| Registered electors | | 2,744 | | |
| Conservative hold | | | | |
| Liberal gain from Independent | | | | |

=== Tendring & Weeley ===
Tendring & Weeley
| Party | Candidate | Votes | % | ±% |
|---|---|---|---|---|
| Conservative | C. Lumber | 740 | 59.2 | N/A |
| Liberal | P. Mead | 349 | 27.9 | N/A |
| Labour | S. Wallis | 160 | 12.8 | N/A |
| Majority | | 391 | 31.3 | N/A |
| Turnout | | 1,249 | 68.7 | N/A |
| Registered electors | | 1,819 | | |
| Conservative hold | | | | |

=== Walton ===
Walton (3 seats)
| Party | Candidate | Votes | % | ±% |
|---|---|---|---|---|
| Conservative | P. Rayner* | 2,290 | 72.4 | –3.7 |
| Conservative | E. Day* | 2,183 | 69.0 | –4.0 |
| Conservative | W. O'Connor | 2,165 | 68.4 | –3.8 |
| Labour | S. Grant | 874 | 27.6 | +3.6 |
| Labour | N. McKinley | 863 | 27.3 | +3.3 |
| Labour | M. Wilson | 862 | 27.2 | N/A |
| Turnout | | ~3,165 | 65.4 | +28.8 |
| Registered electors | | 4,839 | | |
| Conservative hold | | | | |
| Conservative hold | | | | |
| Conservative hold | | | | |
