= 1995 Tendring District Council election =

1995 UK local government election

- 4 May 1995

All 60 seats to Tendring District Council 31 seats needed for a majority

	First party	Second party	Third party
Party	Labour	Conservative	Liberal Democrats
Last election	11 seats, 24.5%	18 seats, 36.2%	20 seats, 30.8%
Seats won	37	8	7
Seat change	▲26	▼10	▼13
Popular vote	36,215	16,703	12,276
Percentage	48.9%	22.6%	16.6%
Swing	▲24.4%	▼13.6%	▼14.2%
	Fourth party	Fifth party
Party	Independent	Residents
Last election	5 seats, 4.3%	4 seats, 2.1%
Seats won	4	4
Seat change	▼1	Steady
Popular vote	7,291	0
Percentage	9.9%	0.0%
Swing	▲5.6%	▼2.1%
- Winner of each seat at the 1995 Tendring District Council election.
Council control before election
No overall control
Council control after election
Labour

The 1995 Tendring District Council election was held on 4 May 1995. This was on the same day as other local elections across the United Kingdom.

== Summary ==
=== Election result ===
1995 Tendring District Council election
Party	Candidates	Seats	Gains	Losses	Net gain/loss	Seats %	Votes %	Votes	+/−
Labour	50	37	26	0	▲26	61.7	48.9	36,215	+24.4
Conservative	31	8	1	12	▼11	13.3	22.6	16,703	–13.6
Liberal Democrats	23	7	0	13	▼13	11.7	16.6	12,276	–14.2
Independent	18	4	2	3	▼1	6.7	9.9	7,291	+5.6
Residents	4	4	0	0	Steady	6.7	0.0	0	–2.1
Ind. Conservative	1	0	0	1	▼1	0.0	0.8	571	–0.4
Independent Liberal	1	0	0	0	Steady	0.0	0.5	401	N/A
Ind. Lib Dem	1	0	0	0	Steady	0.0	0.5	364	N/A
Green	2	0	0	0	Steady	0.0	0.3	197	±0.0

== Ward results ==
=== Alresford, Thorrington & Frating ===
Alresford, Thorrington & Frating (2 seats)
Party	Candidate	Votes	%	±%
Labour	M. McGann	528	42.8	+23.1
Labour	Terry Ripo	466	37.8	N/A
Liberal Democrats	S. Carrington*	439	35.6	–18.2
Liberal Democrats	J. Hayward*	370	30.0	–18.4
Independent	N. Culley	347	28.1	N/A
Turnout		~1,234	43.1	–12.9
Registered electors		2,862		
Labour gain from Liberal Democrats				
Labour gain from Liberal Democrats				

=== Ardleigh ===
Ardleigh
Party	Candidate	Votes	%	±%
Independent	C. Tootal	367	69.1	N/A
Conservative	M. Robinson*	164	30.9	−15.7
Turnout		531	34.4	–12.6
Registered electors		1,557		
Independent gain from Conservative				

=== Beaumont & Thorpe ===
Beaumont & Thorpe
Party	Candidate	Votes	%	±%
Independent	J. Powells*	376	64.2	+13.8
Labour	D. Somers-Bird	210	35.8	N/A
Turnout		586	33.6	–7.3
Registered electors		1,746		
Independent hold				

=== Bockings Elm ===
Bockings Elm (2 seats)
Party	Candidate	Votes	%	±%
Liberal Democrats	D. Harper	1,230	45.7	–9.1
Labour	D. Bolton	1,133	42.1	+28.7
Liberal Democrats	H. Shearing	1,093	40.6	–13.6
Labour	P. Weinreb	909	33.8	+20.4
Ind. Lib Dem	O. Collard	364	13.5	N/A
Turnout		2,692	31.6	–8.4
Registered electors		8,520		
Liberal Democrats hold				
Labour gain from Liberal Democrats				

=== Bradfield, Wrabness & Wix ===
Bradfield, Wrabness & Wix
Party	Candidate	Votes	%	±%
Labour	C. Poulton	314	40.5	N/A
Independent	R. McLaren*	271	35.0	−16.0
Conservative	J. Glenn	190	24.5	−24.5
Turnout		775	46.5	–3.5
Registered electors		1,674		
Labour gain from Independent				

=== Brightlingsea East ===
Brightlingsea East (2 seats)
Party	Candidate	Votes	%	±%
Labour	O. Olivier	813	56.8	+23.7
Independent	P. Patrick*	669	46.8	–7.7
Labour	J. Ruffell	600	42.0	N/A
Liberal Democrats	T. Dale*	512	35.8	–8.8
Turnout		~1,430	46.0	–7.0
Registered electors		3,109		
Labour gain from Liberal Democrats				
Independent hold				

=== Brightlingsea West ===
Brightlingsea West (2 seats)
Party	Candidate	Votes	%	±%
Labour	D. Barrenger	696	55.9	+25.1
Liberal Democrats	D. Dixon*	624	50.2	–1.4
Labour	C. Olivier	620	49.8	N/A
Independent	J. Partridge*	533	42.8	+0.8
Green	S. Redfearn	123	9.9	N/A
Turnout		~1,244	41.6	–5.4
Registered electors		2,991		
Labour gain from Independent				
Liberal Democrats hold				

=== Elmstead ===
Elmstead
Party	Candidate	Votes	%	±%
Conservative	L. Parrish*	382	50.6	–1.3
Liberal Democrats	K. Hawkins	299	39.6	+20.6
Green	R. Bruce	74	9.8	+4.6
Majority		83	11.0	–17.1
Turnout		755	40.1	–8.9
Registered electors		1,890		
Conservative hold		Swing	▼11.0	

=== Frinton ===
Frinton (3 seats)
Party	Candidate	Votes	%	±%
Conservative	W. Shelton*	1,298	54.1	–16.7
Conservative	A. D'Ancey	1,173	48.9	–17.8
Conservative	E. Allen*	1,156	48.2	–18.4
Independent	A. Finnegan-Butler*	679	28.3	N/A
Independent	C. May	606	25.3	N/A
Independent	W. Finnegan-Butler	550	22.9	N/A
Labour	D. Enever	511	21.3	+6.8
Labour	C. Aldous	509	21.2	+8.6
Labour	J. Enever	469	19.5	+8.9
Turnout		~2,400	45.0	–3.9
Registered electors		5,333		
Conservative hold				
Conservative hold				
Conservative hold				

=== Golf Green ===
Golf Green (2 seats)
Party	Candidate	Votes	%	±%
Labour	R. Smith*	1,300	75.1	+14.7
Labour	J. Fluin*	1,114	64.3	+17.5
Independent	C. Judd	368	21.3	N/A
Conservative	F. Butler	338	19.5	+0.2
Turnout		~1,732	46.1	–1.9
Registered electors		3,756		
Labour hold				
Labour hold				

=== Great & Little Oakley ===
Great & Little Oakley
Party	Candidate	Votes	%	±%
Labour	J. Besser	444	58.7	+28.4
Conservative	D. Wood*	219	29.0	–7.5
Liberal Democrats	G. Potter	93	12.3	–20.9
Majority		225	29.8	N/A
Turnout		756	45.6	–6.0
Registered electors		1,661		
Labour gain from Conservative		Swing	▲18.0	

=== Great Bentley ===
Great Bentley
Party	Candidate	Votes	%	±%
Liberal Democrats	R. Taylor*	522	65.7	+0.2
Conservative	B. Johnston	273	34.3	–0.2
Majority		249	31.3	+0.3
Turnout		795	44.6	–5.0
Registered electors		1,790		
Liberal Democrats hold		Swing	▲0.2	

=== Great Bromley, Little Bromley & Little Bentley ===
Great Bromley, Little Bromley & Little Bentley
Party	Candidate	Votes	%	±%
Conservative	N. Rowe	275	54.3	+6.9
Independent	A. Elvin*	231	45.7	N/A
Majority		44	8.7	N/A
Turnout		506	42.3	–5.4
Registered electors		1,215		
Conservative gain from Liberal Democrats				

=== Harwich East ===
Harwich East (2 seats)
Party	Candidate	Votes	%	±%
Labour	E. Brand*	693	65.0	+22.0
Labour	Ivan Henderson	679	63.7	+31.5
Independent	F. Good*	325	30.5	N/A
Independent	J. Meek	198	18.6	N/A
Turnout		~1,066	42.1	–3.6
Registered electors		2,533		
Labour hold				
Labour gain from Ind. Conservative				

=== Harwich East Central ===
Harwich East Central (2 seats)
Party	Candidate	Votes	%	±%
Labour	P. Brand*	782	65.1	+20.6
Labour	D. McLeod	679	56.5	+16.5
Conservative	W. Bleakley*	481	40.0	–3.8
Turnout		~1,202	43.3	–2.9
Registered electors		2,776		
Labour hold				
Labour gain from Conservative				

=== Harwich West ===
Harwich West (2 seats)
Party	Candidate	Votes	%	±%
Labour	Les Double	1,037	65.3	–0.9
Labour	W. Mixter*	1,014	63.9	+14.2
Independent	E. Yallop	475	29.9	N/A
Turnout		~1,588	39.0	–5.9
Registered electors		4,071		
Labour hold				
Labour hold				

=== Harwich West Central ===
Harwich West Central (2 seats)
Party	Candidate	Votes	%	±%
Labour	S. Henderson*	819	62.3	+13.4
Labour	D. Robson*	705	53.7	+15.3
Independent	G. Wallington-Hayes	420	32.0	N/A
Conservative	J. Spall	372	28.3	–7.9
Turnout		~1,314	47.2	–2.8
Registered electors		2,784		
Labour hold				
Labour hold				

=== Haven ===
Haven (2 seats)
Party	Candidate	Votes	%	±%
Residents	J. Hewitt*	Unopposed		
Residents	E. Fone*	Unopposed		
Registered electors		2,683		
Residents hold				
Residents hold				

=== Holland & Kirby ===
Holland & Kirby (2 seats)
Party	Candidate	Votes	%	±%
Labour	C. Nimmo	1,020	53.1	+34.7
Labour	B. Theadom	1,018	53.0	+37.1
Conservative	G. Reilly	835	43.5	–13.4
Conservative	P. Hurst	816	42.5	N/A
Turnout		~1,920	42.7	–0.1
Registered electors		4,497		
Labour gain from Independent				
Labour gain from Conservative				

=== Lawford & Manningtree ===
Lawford & Manningtree (2 seats)
Party	Candidate	Votes	%	±%
Labour	L. Randall*	991	58.5	+16.5
Labour	R. Ling*	816	48.2	+17.9
Liberal Democrats	J. Kelly	445	26.3	–6.0
Conservative	B. Rolfe	368	21.7	–13.5
Liberal Democrats	M. Dew	322	26.3	–6.0
Conservative	R. Humphreys	278	16.4	–8.7
Turnout		1,693	41.6	–7.1
Registered electors		4,070		
Labour hold				
Labour gain from Conservative				

=== Little Clacton ===
Little Clacton
Party	Candidate	Votes	%	±%
Independent	W. Ford	354	52.4	N/A
Independent	K. Daniel	322	47.6	N/A
Turnout		686	30.7	–8.2
Registered electors		2,233		
Independent gain from Ind. Conservative				

=== Mistley ===
Mistley
Party	Candidate	Votes	%	±%
Liberal Democrats	R. Smith*	451	56.4	–0.6
Labour	L. Rogers	200	25.0	+2.7
Conservative	G. Streames	148	18.5	–2.2
Majority		251	31.4	–3.4
Turnout		799	44.9	–7.4
Registered electors		1,790		
Liberal Democrats hold		Swing	▼1.7	

=== Ramsey & Parkeston ===
Ramsey & Parkeston
Party	Candidate	Votes	%	±%
Labour	W. Elmer*	Unopposed		
Registered electors		1,795		
Labour hold				

=== Rush Green ===
Rush Green (3 seats)
Party	Candidate	Votes	%	±%
Labour	C. Baker*	996	71.7	+33.8
Labour	F. Baker	907	65.3	+30.5
Labour	G. Mills*	882	63.5	+29.4
Conservative	G. Downing	363	26.1	–11.8
Turnout		~1,390	32.8	–11.2
Registered electors		4,237		
Labour hold				
Labour gain from Conservative				
Labour gain from Conservative				

=== Southcliff ===
Southcliff (3 seats)
Party	Candidate	Votes	%	±%
Conservative	C. Jessop*	754	43.6	–0.3
Conservative	P. Vanner*	683	39.5	–3.6
Labour	J. Bond	670	38.7	+27.2
Conservative	M. Hughes	630	36.4	–4.7
Labour	G. Mackie	609	35.2	+26.7
Labour	G. Craft	602	34.8	+26.6
Ind. Conservative	J. Molyneaux	571	33.0	N/A
Turnout		~1,729	38.7	–10.3
Registered electors		4,468		
Conservative hold				
Conservative hold				
Labour gain from Liberal Democrats				

=== St Bartholomews ===
St Bartholomews
Party	Candidate	Votes	%	±%
Residents	B. Thomasson*	Unopposed		
Residents	A. Tovey*	Unopposed		
Registered electors		2,813		
Residents hold				
Residents hold				

=== St James ===
St James (3 seats)
Party	Candidate	Votes	%	±%
Labour	P. Ball	867	49.4	+32.0
Labour	S. Lawrence	825	47.0	+30.0
Labour	M. Rothwell	740	42.2	+26.4
Conservative	A. Overton*	565	32.2	–8.9
Conservative	R. Gladwin*	522	29.8	–7.3
Conservative	V. Stone	498	28.4	–7.4
Liberal Democrats	R. Harper	322	18.4	–24.3
Liberal Democrats	B. Wright	313	17.8	–16.6
Turnout		~1,754	34.8	–4.2
Registered electors		5,041		
Labour gain from Liberal Democrats				
Labour gain from Conservative				
Labour gain from Conservative				

=== St Johns ===
St Johns (3 seats)
Party	Candidate	Votes	%	±%
Liberal Democrats	P. Manning*	1,043	46.6	–31.8
Liberal Democrats	W. Bensilum*	980	43.8	–27.5
Labour	N. Jacobs	866	38.7	+28.2
Liberal Democrats	P. Ost	812	36.3	–33.6
Labour	M. Rouse	737	32.9	+23.8
Labour	M. Morley-Souter	729	32.6	+23.6
Conservative	A. Owens	378	16.9	+1.9
Turnout		~2,237	39.9	–11.1
Registered electors		5,607		
Liberal Democrats hold				
Liberal Democrats hold				
Labour gain from Liberal Democrats				

=== St Marys ===
St Marys (3 seats)
Party	Candidate	Votes	%	±%
Labour	S. Morley-Souter	605	46.4	+22.4
Labour	G. Morgan	600	46.0	+22.5
Labour	T. Cook	523	40.1	+16.9
Liberal Democrats	M. Bargent*	474	36.4	–20.3
Liberal Democrats	P. Miller*	421	32.3	–20.7
Liberal Democrats	J. Bray	408	31.3	–20.8
Conservative	R. Moodey	190	14.6	–2.5
Turnout		~1,304	33.8	–6.2
Registered electors		3,857		
Labour gain from Liberal Democrats				
Labour gain from Liberal Democrats				
Labour gain from Liberal Democrats				

=== St. Osyth & Point Clear ===
St Osyth & Point Clear (2 seats)
Party	Candidate	Votes	%	±%
Labour	T. Osben	452	35.2	N/A
Labour	J. Ward	438	34.1	N/A
Liberal Democrats	J. White*	424	33.0	–28.7
Ind. Lib Dem	J. Smith	401	31.2	N/A
Conservative	A. Anderson	310	24.1	–16.8
Independent	A. Quilter	200	15.6	N/A
Turnout		~1,285	40.5	–9.5
Registered electors		3,174		
Labour gain from Liberal Democrats				
Labour gain from Liberal Democrats				

=== Tendring & Weeley ===
Tendring & Weeley
Party	Candidate	Votes	%	±%
Liberal Democrats	B. Rooney	387	58.9	+6.8
Conservative	A. Green	270	41.1	–6.8
Majority		117	17.8	+13.6
Turnout		657	36.3	–5.2
Registered electors		1,817		
Liberal Democrats hold		Swing	▲6.8	

=== Walton ===
Walton (3 seats)
Party	Candidate	Votes	%	±%
Labour	P. Lawes	1,106	49.6	+7.1
Labour	R. Lawes	1,022	45.9	+5.5
Conservative	C. Turner*	955	42.9	–12.0
Labour	J. Topham	950	42.6	+4.5
Conservative	D. Aldrich*	921	41.3	–11.8
Conservative	M. Page*	898	40.3	–11.8
Liberal Democrats	S. Challis	292	13.1	N/A
Turnout		~2,228	41.1	–6.6
Registered electors		5,422		
Labour gain from Conservative				
Labour gain from Conservative				
Conservative hold				

== By-elections ==
=== Elmstead ===
Elmstead by-election: 16 November 1995
Party	Candidate	Votes	%	±%
Conservative		250	31.8	–18.8
Labour		230	29.2	N/A
Liberal Democrats		156	19.8	–19.8
Independent		151	19.2	N/A
Majority		20	2.6	–8.4
Turnout		787	41.9	+1.8
Registered electors		1,878		
Conservative hold				

=== Harwich West Central ===
Harwich West Central by-election: 18 April 1996
Party	Candidate	Votes	%	±%
Labour		559	55.6	+4.8
Independent		209	20.8	N/A
Conservative		132	13.1	–10.0
Liberal Democrats		105	10.4	N/A
Majority		350	34.8	N/A
Turnout		1,005	36.1	–11.1
Registered electors		2,784		
Labour hold				

=== Haven ===
Haven by-election: 21 November 1996
Party	Candidate	Votes	%	±%
Independent		655	62.3	N/A
Conservative		221	21.0	N/A
Labour		142	13.5	N/A
Liberal Democrats		33	3.1	N/A
Majority		434	41.3	N/A
Turnout		1,051	39.3	N/A
Registered electors		2,674		
Independent gain from Residents				

=== St James ===
St James by-election: 10 July 1997
Party	Candidate	Votes	%	±%
Conservative		352	39.5	+7.3
Labour		321	36.0	–13.4
Liberal Democrats		219	24.6	+6.2
Majority		31	3.5	N/A
Turnout		892	17.2	–17.6
Registered electors		5,186		
Conservative gain from Labour		Swing	▲10.4	

=== Harwich East ===
Harwich East by-election: 2 October 1997
Party	Candidate	Votes	%	±%
Labour		340	50.1	–18.0
Conservative		151	22.3	N/A
Other		103	15.2	N/A
Liberal Democrats		84	12.4	N/A
Majority		189	27.8	N/A
Turnout		678	27.5	–14.6
Registered electors		2,465		
Labour hold				
