= 1987 Tendring District Council election =

1987 UK local government election

- 5 May 1987

All 60 seats to Tendring District Council 31 seats needed for a majority

	First party	Second party	Third party
Party	Conservative	Alliance	Residents
Last election	32 seats, 42.8%	8 seats, 21.0%	8 seats, 7.3%
Seats won	33	15	5
Seat change	▲1	▲7	▼3
Popular vote	40,224	28,896	5,996
Percentage	42.7%	30.7%	6.4%
Swing	▼0.1%	▲9.7%	▼0.9%
	Fourth party	Fifth party	Sixth party
Party	Labour	Independent	Ind. Conservative
Last election	8 seats, 21.2%	4 seats, 6.1%	0 seats, 1.5%
Seats won	4	2	1
Seat change	▼4	▼2	▲1
Popular vote	16,537	1,989	347
Percentage	17.6%	2.1%	0.4%
Swing	▼3.6%	▼4.0%	▼1.1%
- Winner of each seat at the 1987 Tendring District Council election.
Council control before election
Conservative
Council control after election
Conservative

The 1987 Tendring District Council election took place on 7 May 1987 to elect members of Tendring District Council in England. This was the same day as other local elections held across the United Kingdom.

== Summary ==
=== Election result ===
1987 Tendring District Council election
Party	Seats	Gains	Losses	Net gain/loss	Seats %	Votes %	Votes	+/−
Conservative	33			▲1	55.0	42.7	40,224	–0.1
Alliance	15			▲7	25.0	30.7	28,896	+9.7
Residents	5			▼3	8.3	6.4	5,996	–0.9
Labour	4			▼4	6.7	17.6	16,537	–3.6
Independent	2			▼2	3.3	2.1	1,989	–4.0
Ind. Conservative	1			▲1	1.7	0.4	347	–1.1
Independent Liberal	0			Steady	0.0	0.3	236	N/A

== Ward results ==
=== Alresford, Thorrington and Frating ===
Alresford, Thorrington & Frating (2 seats)
Party	Candidate	Votes	%	±%
Alliance	D. Fitch	707	45.9	+6.8
Alliance	J. Hayward	630	40.9	+9.9
Conservative	R. Lord*	625	40.5	–4.4
Conservative	R. Silcock	556	36.1	–5.6
Labour	P. Duncombe	210	13.6	–2.3
Labour	J. Duncombe	203	13.2	–2.0
Turnout		~1,542	52.8	+7.1
Registered electors		2,920		
Alliance gain from Conservative				
Alliance gain from Conservative				

=== Ardleigh ===
Ardleigh
Party	Candidate	Votes	%	±%
Conservative	H. Varney	436	56.8	–1.7
Independent	P. Bates	181	23.6	N/A
Labour	P. Watson	150	19.6	–21.9
Majority		255	33.2	+16.2
Turnout		767	48.9	±0.0
Registered electors		1,569		
Conservative hold				

=== Beaumont and Thorpe ===
Beaumont & Thorpe
Party	Candidate	Votes	%	±%
Independent	M. Wright*	380	54.6	–32.8
Alliance	D. Page	236	33.9	N/A
Labour	I. Jefferson	80	11.5	–1.1
Majority		144	20.7	–54.2
Turnout		696	41.3	+3.3
Registered electors		1,684		
Independent hold				

=== Bockings Elm ===
Bockings Elm (2 seats)
Party	Candidate	Votes	%	±%
Alliance	J. Candler	1,901	55.7	+24.0
Alliance	D. Spence	1,865	54.6	+34.6
Conservative	R. Buckley	1,160	34.0	–14.5
Conservative	M. Fitz*	1,141	33.4	–14.8
Labour	J. Bond	358	10.5	–9.4
Labour	H. Fenton	334	9.8	N/A
Turnout		~3,415	45.6	+8.6
Registered electors		7,490		
Alliance gain from Conservative				
Alliance gain from Conservative				

=== Bradfield, Wrabness and Wix ===
Bradfield, Wrabness & Wix
Party	Candidate	Votes	%	±%
Conservative	H. Abbott	433	52.0	–18.6
Labour	G. Crask	271	32.5	+3.1
Alliance	M. Offord	129	15.5	N/A
Majority		162	19.4	–21.8
Turnout		833	52.5	+0.9
Registered electors		1,587		
Conservative hold		Swing	▼10.9	

=== Brightlingsea East ===
Brightlingsea East (2 seats)
Party	Candidate	Votes	%	±%
Independent	P. Patrick*	556	31.1	–12.7
Conservative	R. Morgan	529	29.6	N/A
Alliance	C. House*	473	26.4	–14.0
Conservative	D. Hicks	413	23.1	N/A
Independent	M. Allen	276	15.4	N/A
Alliance	W. Miller	239	13.4	N/A
Labour	S. Lavallin	231	12.9	–3.0
Labour	J. King	164	9.2	–2.1
Turnout		~1,789	61.3	–5.1
Registered electors		2,918		
Independent hold				
Conservative gain from Alliance				

=== Brightlingsea West ===
Brightlingsea West (2 seats)
Party	Candidate	Votes	%	±%
Conservative	P. Coupland	769	46.2	+20.9
Alliance	B. Stephens*	673	40.5	+4.4
Alliance	R. Goodenough	657	39.5	+7.5
Conservative	G. Smith	462	27.8	N/A
Labour	L. Jakubowski	220	13.2	–5.6
Labour	A. Turner	204	12.3	–3.3
Turnout		~1,663	56.5	–0.5
Registered electors		2,944		
Conservative gain from Alliance				
Alliance hold				

=== Elmstead ===
Elmstead
Party	Candidate	Votes	%	±%
Conservative	L. Parrish*	552	64.8	–2.0
Labour	P. Woodgate	300	35.2	+2.0
Majority		252	29.6	–4.0
Turnout		852	45.9	–2.3
Registered electors		1,858		
Conservative hold		Swing	▼2.0	

=== Frinton ===
Frinton (3 seats)
Party	Candidate	Votes	%	±%
Conservative	W. Shelton*	2,329	66.8	–19.4
Conservative	M. Rex*	2,256	64.7	–19.6
Conservative	A. Finnegan-Butler	1,997	57.3	–23.4
Alliance	R. Hamilton	1,000	28.7	N/A
Alliance	J. Russell	982	28.2	N/A
Labour	D. Enever	319	9.1	–4.6
Turnout		~3,487	73.4	+32.8
Registered electors		4,750		
Conservative hold				
Conservative hold				
Conservative hold				

=== Golf Green ===
Golf Green (2 seats)
Party	Candidate	Votes	%	±%
Residents	R. Druce*	606	37.6	–8.8
Conservative	P. Harding	605	37.6	+4.7
Residents	R. Finn*	476	29.6	–7.0
Alliance	A. Wallis	202	12.5	+3.6
Labour	D. Raby	199	12.4	+0.5
Alliance	L. Wallis	147	9.1	N/A
Turnout		~1,610	48.8	+5.9
Registered electors		3,300		
Residents hold				
Conservative gain from Residents				

=== Great and Little Oakley ===
Great & Little Oakley
Party	Candidate	Votes	%	±%
Conservative	A. Finch	407	48.2	+1.1
Labour	C. Poulton	247	29.3	+3.2
Alliance	G. Turner	190	22.5	–4.3
Majority		160	19.0	–1.2
Turnout		844	55.3	+9.5
Registered electors		1,525		
Conservative hold		Swing	▼1.1	

=== Great Bentley ===
Great Bentley
Party	Candidate	Votes	%	±%
Conservative	A. Dimambro	461	50.8	–6.9
Alliance	R. Taylor	381	42.0	+9.6
Labour	N. Gallagher	65	7.2	–2.7
Majority		80	8.8	–16.5
Turnout		907	53.3	+7.8
Registered electors		1,702		
Conservative hold		Swing	▼8.3	

=== Great Bromley, Little Bromley and Little Bentley ===
Great Bromley, Little Bromley & Little Bentley
Party	Candidate	Votes	%	±%
Conservative	S. Pound*	341	77.9	+12.1
Labour	G. Mills	97	22.1	–12.1
Majority		244	55.7	+24.2
Turnout		438	41.2	–7.6
Registered electors		1,063		
Conservative hold		Swing	▲12.1	

=== Harwich East ===
Harwich East (2 seats)
Party	Candidate	Votes	%	±%
Conservative	F. Good*	716	44.2	+0.2
Labour	K. Todd*	630	38.9	+13.5
Labour	Ivan Henderson	504	31.1	+5.8
Conservative	P. Cullen	335	20.7	N/A
Alliance	C. Townsend	275	17.0	+4.3
Turnout		~1,620	61.8	–3.3
Registered electors		2,621		
Conservative hold				
Labour hold				

=== Harwich East Central ===
Harwich East Central (2 seats)
Party	Candidate	Votes	%	±%
Conservative	W. Bleakley*	615	40.8	–8.1
Conservative	D. Rutson*	503	33.4	–5.1
Labour	W. Blacker	451	30.0	+8.9
Alliance	M. Sears	440	29.2	–0.8
Labour	M. Hedge	420	27.9	+7.5
Alliance	D. Marshall	396	26.3	+3.4
Turnout		~1,506	53.6	+6.8
Registered electors		2,809		
Conservative hold				
Conservative hold				

=== Harwich West ===
Harwich West (2 seats)
Party	Candidate	Votes	%	±%
Labour	R. Knight*	925	46.0	+3.7
Conservative	E. Yallop	583	29.0	+2.3
Labour	K. Rose	560	27.9	–2.6
Conservative	R. Kenneison	533	26.5	+0.4
Alliance	M. Gochin	503	25.0	–6.0
Turnout		~2,010	57.1	+8.9
Registered electors		3,521		
Labour hold				
Conservative gain from Alliance				

=== Harwich West Central ===
Harwich West Central (2 seats)
Party	Candidate	Votes	%	±%
Conservative	J. Spall*	550	36.6	–4.4
Labour	S. Henderson	511	34.0	+10.7
Conservative	G. Wallington-Hayes*	508	33.8	–5.6
Labour	D. Robson	457	30.4	+7.4
Alliance	T. Booth	443	29.5	–6.2
Alliance	D. Murrison	419	27.9	–3.5
Turnout		~1,504	53.3	+4.6
Registered electors		2,822		
Conservative hold				
Labour gain from Conservative				

=== Haven ===
Haven (2 seats)
Party	Candidate	Votes	%	±%
Residents	I. Fairbairn*	1,184	83.3	N/A
Residents	J. Hewitt*	1,150	80.9	N/A
Alliance	A. Laird	154	10.8	N/A
Alliance	R. Laird	123	8.7	N/A
Labour	S. Knight	83	5.8	N/A
Turnout		~1,422	53.9	N/A
Registered electors		2,638		
Residents hold				
Residents hold				

=== Holland and Kirby ===
Holland & Kirby (2 seats)
Party	Candidate	Votes	%	±%
Alliance	T. Oxborrow	952	41.1	+27.3
Conservative	G. Reilly*	870	37.6	+4.4
Conservative	R. Rogers	820	35.4	+12.2
Alliance	J. Edwards	699	30.2	N/A
Residents	G. Miles	337	14.6	–30.6
Residents	J. Martin	333	14.4	–21.8
Labour	C. Evans	155	6.7	–1.2
Turnout		~2,316	56.7	+6.5
Registered electors		4,084		
Alliance gain from Residents				
Conservative gain from Residents				

=== Lawford and Manningtree ===
Lawford & Manningtree (2 seats)
Party	Candidate	Votes	%	±%
Conservative	D. Pallett	771	41.1	N/A
Conservative	D. Haynes	696	37.1	N/A
Labour	L. Randall*	695	37.1	–9.8
Labour	R. Dunn*	578	30.8	–9.0
Alliance	F. Nichols	409	21.8	–5.8
Alliance	H. Cutting	400	21.3	N/A
Turnout		~1,875	55.6	–3.5
Registered electors		3,372		
Conservative gain from Labour				
Conservative gain from Labour				

=== Little Clacton ===
Little Clacton
Party	Candidate	Votes	%	±%
Ind. Conservative	P. De-Vaux Balbirnie	347	48.3	N/A
Independent	W. Ford	275	38.2	N/A
Labour	P. Hedge	97	13.5	–0.8
Majority		72	10.0	N/A
Turnout		719	34.7	+5.5
Registered electors		2,070		
Ind. Conservative gain from Independent				

=== Mistley ===
Mistley
Party	Candidate	Votes	%	±%
Alliance	R. Smith	373	39.9	+14.0
Labour	J. Dorchester	336	35.9	+15.3
Conservative	D. Coggins	227	24.3	–7.0
Majority		37	4.0	N/A
Turnout		936	55.9	+2.4
Registered electors		1,673		
Alliance gain from Conservative		Swing	▼0.7	

=== Ramsey and Parkeston ===
Ramsey & Parkeston
Party	Candidate	Votes	%	±%
Labour	W. Elmer*	386	53.5	+16.9
Alliance	B. Fawcett	335	46.5	+34.0
Majority		51	7.1	–1.8
Turnout		721	47.2	–4.4
Registered electors		1,528		
Labour hold		Swing	▼8.6	

=== Rush Green ===
Rush Green (3 seats)
Party	Candidate	Votes	%	±%
Conservative	A. Harmer	830	39.0	+1.9
Conservative	M. Amos	809	38.0	+3.7
Conservative	P. Harmer*	778	36.6	N/A
Labour	P. Johnson	722	34.0	+7.9
Labour	R. Negus	693	32.6	+8.5
Labour	R. Raby	672	31.6	+7.8
Alliance	W. Cameron	337	15.8	–9.0
Independent	C. Humphrey	236	11.1	–0.8
Turnout		~2,126	51.2	–0.3
Registered electors		4,153		
Conservative gain from Labour				
Conservative hold				
Conservative hold				

=== Southcliff ===
Southcliff (3 seats)
Party	Candidate	Votes	%	±%
Conservative	C. Jessop*	1,169	56.4	+10.8
Conservative	J. Molyneux	1,140	55.0	+11.1
Conservative	L. King*	1,062	51.3	+9.8
Alliance	S. Davers	613	29.6	+4.6
Labour	O. Smith	290	14.0	+4.5
Turnout		~2,071	49.8	–9.0
Registered electors		4,159		
Conservative hold				
Conservative hold				
Conservative hold				

=== St. Bartholomews ===
St. Bartholomews (2 seats)
Party	Candidate	Votes	%	±%
Residents	J. Cole*	1,282	81.6	–8.9
Residents	A. Tovey	1,234	78.5	–8.9
Alliance	A. Cameron	168	10.7	N/A
Labour	W. Jefferson	122	7.8	–1.8
Turnout		~1,572	54.5	+5.7
Registered electors		2,884		
Residents hold				
Residents hold				

=== St James ===
St James (3 seats)
Party	Candidate	Votes	%	±%
Conservative	A. Overton*	896	43.0	+0.8
Conservative	R. Huse	861	41.4	+2.5
Alliance	D. Tunstill	786	37.8	+19.2
Conservative	J. Goldsmith*	726	34.9	+0.2
Labour	L. Banyard	402	19.3	+6.5
Labour	L. Banyard	393	18.9	+6.1
Turnout		~2,082	44.9	–2.9
Registered electors		4,637		
Conservative hold				
Conservative hold				
Alliance gain from Conservative				

=== St Johns ===
St Johns (3 seats)
Party	Candidate	Votes	%	±%
Alliance	P. Bevan*	1,852	61.3	+14.1
Alliance	W. Bensilum	1,749	57.9	+21.1
Alliance	P. Manning*	1,685	55.8	N/A
Conservative	S. Dawson	882	29.2	–6.4
Conservative	R. Macmahon	798	26.4	–7.0
Conservative	P. Vanner	768	25.4	–7.2
Labour	S. Morley	288	9.5	–7.7
Labour	N. Jacobs	281	9.3	–5.0
Labour	M. Souter	268	8.9	–4.8
Turnout		~3,020	54.3	–2.1
Registered electors		5,562		
Alliance hold				
Alliance gain from Conservative				
Alliance hold				

=== St Marys ===
St Marys (3 seats)
Party	Candidate	Votes	%	±%
Alliance	L. Redpath	934	39.6	+24.6
Alliance	M. Bargent	914	38.7	N/A
Alliance	A. Kitchen	760	32.2	N/A
Labour	R. Smith*	714	30.3	–1.7
Conservative	J. Brittain	389	16.5	–1.1
Conservative	A. Shove	340	14.4	N/A
Labour	E. Crask	332	14.1	–4.5
Labour	B. Theadom	329	13.9	–4.1
Independent	D. Moody*	321	13.6	–8.9
Turnout		~2,359	60.4	+0.3
Registered electors		3,906		
Alliance gain from Labour				
Alliance gain from Independent				
Alliance gain from Labour				

=== St Osyth and Point Clear ===
St Osyth & Point Clear (2 seats)
Party	Candidate	Votes	%	±%
Alliance	T. Dale*	755	48.3	+10.1
Conservative	C. de Chair	661	42.3	+10.4
Alliance	A. Manwaring	464	29.7	–2.3
Labour	A. Wilson	145	9.3	N/A
Turnout		~1,562	54.7	–7.5
Registered electors		2,855		
Alliance hold				
Conservative gain from Alliance				

=== Tendring and Weeley ===
Tendring & Weeley
Party	Candidate	Votes	%	±%
Conservative	C. Lumber*	497	73.7	+11.6
Labour	S. Lloyd-Biggs	106	15.7	+5.5
Alliance	D. Roberts	71	10.5	–17.2
Majority		391	58.0	+23.7
Turnout		674	35.0	–3.7
Registered electors		1,923		
Conservative hold		Swing	▲3.1	

=== Walton ===
Walton (3 seats)
Party	Candidate	Votes	%	±%
Conservative	M. Page*	1,482	62.0	+10.9
Conservative	D. Hall	1,471	61.5	+11.7
Conservative	A. Rayner*	1,466	61.3	+11.8
Alliance	J. Oxborrow	570	23.8	N/A
Alliance	G. Edwards	461	19.3	N/A
Alliance	C. Munn	444	18.6	N/A
Labour	P. Lawes	340	14.2	–3.6
Turnout		~2,392	44.8	–10.2
Registered electors		5,339		
Conservative hold				
Conservative hold				
Conservative hold				

== By-elections ==
=== Lawford & Manningtree ===
Lawford & Manningtree by-election: 15 October 1987
Party	Candidate	Votes	%	±%
Labour		725	45.5	+8.4
Conservative		640	40.2	–0.9
Alliance		229	14.4	–7.4
Majority		85	5.3	N/A
Turnout		1,594	36.0	–19.6
Registered electors		4,428		
Labour gain from Conservative		Swing	▲4.7	

=== Great & Little Oakley ===
Great & Little Oakley by-election: 22 December 1988
Party	Candidate	Votes	%	±%
SLD		304	45.6	+23.1
Labour		186	27.9	–1.4
Conservative		177	26.5	–21.7
Majority		118	17.7	N/A
Turnout		667	43.0	–12.3
Registered electors		1,551		
SLD gain from Conservative		Swing	▲12.3	

=== Great Bentley ===
Great Bentley by-election: 4 May 1989
Party	Candidate	Votes	%	±%
SLD		354	45.3	+3.3
Conservative		322	41.2	–9.6
Labour		106	13.6	+6.4
Majority		32	4.1	N/A
Turnout		782	44.8	–8.5
Registered electors		1,746		
SLD gain from Conservative		Swing	▲6.5	

=== Ardleigh ===
Ardleigh by-election: 4 May 1989
Party	Candidate	Votes	%	±%
Conservative		256	44.4	–12.4
Green		173	30.0	N/A
Labour		58	10.1	–9.5
Independent		53	9.2	N/A
SLD		37	6.4	N/A
Majority		83	14.4	–18.8
Turnout		577	38.1	–10.8
Registered electors		1,514		
Conservative hold				

=== St Marys (1989) ===
St Marys by-election: 15 June 1989
Party	Candidate	Votes	%	±%
Labour		674	38.7	+8.4
SLD		664	38.1	–1.5
Conservative		363	20.8	+4.3
Independent		42	2.4	N/A
Majority		10	0.6	N/A
Turnout		1,743	43.0	–17.4
Registered electors		4,053		
Labour gain from SLD		Swing	▲5.0	

=== St Marys (1990) ===
St Marys by-election: 5 April 1990
Party	Candidate	Votes	%	±%
SLD		753	49.2	+9.6
Labour		554	36.2	+5.9
Conservative		199	13.0	–3.5
Independent		23	1.5	N/A
Majority		199	13.0	N/A
Turnout		1,529	37.7	–22.7
Registered electors		4,056		
SLD hold		Swing	▲1.9	

=== Walton ===
Walton by-election: 7 June 1990
Party	Candidate	Votes	%	±%
Labour		820	36.8	+22.6
Conservative		812	36.5	–25.5
Independent		474	21.3	N/A
Independent		120	5.4	N/A
Majority		8	0.3	N/A
Turnout		2,226	42.2	–2.6
Registered electors		5,275		
Labour gain from Conservative		Swing	▲24.1	
