= 1999 Tendring District Council election =

Council election in 1999 in Essex, England

- 6 May 1999

All 60 seats to Tendring District Council 31 seats needed for a majority

	First party	Second party	Third party
Party	Labour	Conservative	Liberal Democrats
Last election	37 seats, 48.9%	8 seats, 22.6%	7 seats, 16.6%
Seats won	23	17	9
Seat change	▼12	▲8	▲1
Popular vote	24,408	21,617	9,204
Percentage	37.6%	33.3%	14.2%
Swing	▼11.0%	▲10.3%	▼2.7%
	Fourth party	Fifth party
Party	Independent	Ind. Conservative
Last election	4 seats, 9.9%	0 seats, 0.8%
Seats won	6	1
Seat change	▲2	▲1
Popular vote	8,328	1,244
Percentage	12.8%	1.9%
Swing	▲3.5%	▲1.2%
- Winner of each seat at the 1999 Tendring District Council election.
Council control before election
Labour
Council control after election
No overall control

Elections to Tendring District Council in Essex, England took place on 6 May 1999. This was on the same day as other local elections across the United Kingdom. Although the Labour Party remained the largest party on the council, it lost overall control while the Conservatives made major gains.

== Result summary ==
Tendring District Council election, 1999
Party	Seats	Gains	Losses	Net gain/loss	Seats %	Votes %	Votes	+/−
Labour	23	2	14	▼12		37.6	24,408	-11.0
Conservative	17	10	2	▲8		33.3	21,617	+10.3
Liberal Democrats	9	3	2	▲1		14.2	9,204	-2.7
Independent	6	3	1	▲2		12.8	8,328	+3.5
Ind. Conservative	1	1	0	▲1		1.9	1,244	+1.2
Independent Labour	0	0	0	Steady		0.2	142	N/A

== Ward results ==
=== Alresford, Thorrington & Frating ===
Alresford, Thorrington & Frating (2 seats)
Party	Candidate	Votes	%	±%
Labour	M. McGann*	500	50.7	+7.9
Conservative	I. Dimmock	487	49.3	N/A
Labour	Terry Ripo*	457	46.3	+8.5
Conservative	R. Tovell	412	41.7	N/A
Turnout		~987	33.4	–9.7
Registered electors		2,955		
Labour hold				
Conservative gain from Labour				

=== Ardleigh ===
Ardleigh
Party	Candidate	Votes	%	±%
Independent	C. Tootal*	Unopposed		
Registered electors		1,581		
Independent hold				

=== Beaumont & Thorpe ===
Beaumont & Thorpe
Party	Candidate	Votes	%	±%
Independent	J. Powell*	Unopposed		
Registered electors		1,819		
Independent hold				

=== Bockings Elm ===
Bockings Elm (2 seats)
Party	Candidate	Votes	%	±%
Liberal Democrats	D. Harper*	1,093	50.2	+4.5
Liberal Democrats	H. Shearing	1,030	47.3	+6.7
Labour	D. Bolton*	656	30.2	–11.9
Labour	A. Duffas	619	28.5	–5.3
Conservative	S. Powell	482	22.2	N/A
Conservative	R. Moodey	481	22.1	N/A
Turnout		~2,176	24.3	–7.3
Registered electors		8,953		
Liberal Democrats hold				
Liberal Democrats gain from Labour				

=== Bradfield, Wrabness & Wix ===
Bradfield, Wrabness & Wix
Party	Candidate	Votes	%	±%
Liberal Democrats	M. De Roy	303	59.9	N/A
Labour	C. Poulton*	203	40.1	–0.4
Turnout		506	29.0	–17.5
Registered electors		1,712		
Liberal Democrats gain from Labour				

=== Brightlingsea East ===
Brightlingsea East (2 seats)
Party	Candidate	Votes	%	±%
Independent	P. Patrick*	596	50.9	+4.1
Labour	C. Olivier*	546	46.6	–10.2
Liberal Democrats	T. Dale	507	43.3	+7.5
Labour	J. Ruffell	468	40.0	–2.0
Turnout		~1,171	37.2	–8.8
Registered electors		3,147		
Independent hold				
Labour hold				

=== Brightlingsea West ===
Brightlingsea West (2 seats)
Party	Candidate	Votes	%	±%
Labour	D. Barrenger*	690	62.7	+6.8
Liberal Democrats	D. Dixon*	600	54.5	+4.3
Labour	C. Oliver	445	40.4	–9.4
Liberal Democrats	N. Bailey	343	31.2	N/A
Turnout		~1,101	36.6	–5.0
Registered electors		3,008		
Labour hold				
Liberal Democrats hold				

=== Elmstead ===
Elmstead
Party	Candidate	Votes	%	±%
Conservative	B. Johnston	311	60.0	+9.4
Labour	R. Fisher	138	26.6	N/A
Liberal Democrats	M. Hawkins	69	13.3	–26.3
Turnout		518	34.2	–5.9
Registered electors		1,475		
Conservative hold				

=== Frinton ===
Frinton (3 seats)
Party	Candidate	Votes	%	±%
Conservative	E. Allen	1,730	80.8	+26.7
Conservative	I. Johnson	1,712	80.0	+31.1
Conservative	N. Turner	1,674	78.2	+30.0
Labour	C. Aldous	408	19.1	–2.2
Labour	V. Bird	388	18.1	–3.1
Labour	L. Stevens	385	18.0	–1.5
Turnout		~2,140	40.4	–4.6
Registered electors		5,297		
Conservative hold				
Conservative hold				
Conservative hold				

=== Golf Green ===
Golf Green (2 seats)
Party	Candidate	Votes	%	±%
Labour	R. Smith*	1,070	70.4	–4.7
Labour	M. Alexander	830	54.6	–9.7
Conservative	R. Swinney	275	18.1	–1.4
Independent	R. Essex	268	17.6	N/A
Conservative	M. Walker	237	18.1	–1.4
Independent Labour	C. Judd	142	9.3	N/A
Liberal Democrats	S. Smith	109	7.2	N/A
Turnout		~1,520	40.1	–6.0
Registered electors		3,790		
Labour hold				
Labour hold				

=== Great & Little Oakley ===
Great & Little Oakley
Party	Candidate	Votes	%	±%
Conservative	R. Caddick	251	52.2	+23.2
Labour	J. Besser*	230	47.8	–10.9
Majority		21	4.4	N/A
Turnout		481	29.4	–16.2
Registered electors		1,612		
Conservative gain from Labour		Swing	▲17.1	

=== Great Bentley ===
Great Bentley
Party	Candidate	Votes	%	±%
Liberal Democrats	R. Taylor*	465	63.4	–2.3
Conservative	M. Noyle	192	26.2	–8.1
Labour	A. Mackenzie	77	10.5	N/A
Majority		273	37.2	+5.9
Turnout		734	40.9	–3.7
Registered electors		1,780		
Liberal Democrats hold		Swing	▲2.9	

=== Great Bromley, Little Bromley & Little Bentley ===
Great Bromley, Little Bromley & Little Bentley
Party	Candidate	Votes	%	±%
Conservative	H. Jessop	234	53.4	–0.9
Liberal Democrats	A. Elvin	136	31.1	N/A
Labour	S. Virdee	68	15.5	N/A
Majority		98	22.4	+13.7
Turnout		438	33.7	–8.6
Registered electors		1,263		
Conservative hold				

=== Harwich East ===
Harwich East (2 seats)
Party	Candidate	Votes	%	±%
Labour	E. Brand*	430	68.8	+3.8
Labour	L. Payne*	346	55.3	–8.4
Independent	O. Jones	164	26.2	N/A
Conservative	E. Yallop	138	22.1	N/A
Independent	R. Pannell	129	20.6	N/A
Turnout		~625	25.0	–17.1
Registered electors		2,501		
Labour hold				
Labour hold				

=== Harwich East Central ===
Harwich East Central (2 seats)
Party	Candidate	Votes	%	±%
Labour	P. Brand*	384	46.4	–18.7
Conservative	W. Bleakley	382	46.2	+6.2
Labour	D. McLeod*	371	44.9	–11.6
Conservative	J. Glenn	301	36.4	N/A
Independent	M. Double	110	13.3	N/A
Independent	M. Lowe	87	10.5	N/A
Turnout		~827	30.3	–13.0
Registered electors		2,730		
Labour hold				
Conservative gain from Labour				

=== Harwich West ===
Harwich West (2 seats)
Party	Candidate	Votes	%	±%
Labour	Les Double*	745	68.0	+2.7
Labour	W. Mixter*	692	63.2	–0.7
Independent	P. Newell	274	25.0	N/A
Independent	J. Jacombs	198	18.1	N/A
Conservative	C. Rasch	194	17.7	N/A
Turnout		~1,095	24.7	–14.3
Registered electors		4,434		
Labour hold				
Labour hold				

=== Harwich West Central ===
Harwich West Central (2 seats)
Party	Candidate	Votes	%	±%
Labour	A. Evander*	424	48.5	–13.8
Labour	L. Armstrong	395	45.2	–8.5
Independent	S. Henderson*	333	38.1	N/A
Conservative	J. Spall	301	34.4	+6.1
Independent	T. Skargon	173	19.8	N/A
Turnout		~874	32.2	–15.0
Registered electors		2,715		
Labour hold				
Labour hold				

=== Haven ===
Haven (2 seats)
Party	Candidate	Votes	%	±%
Independent	E. Fone*	792	75.6	N/A
Independent	B. Thomasson	781	74.6	N/A
Labour	A. Stone	163	15.6	N/A
Labour	C. Morgan	154	14.7	N/A
Liberal Democrats	S. Harrison	108	10.3	N/A
Turnout		~1,047	38.8	N/A
Registered electors		2,699		
Independent gain from Residents				
Independent gain from Residents				

=== Holland & Kirby ===
Holland & Kirby (2 seats)
Party	Candidate	Votes	%	±%
Conservative	R. Bucke	864	59.6	+16.1
Conservative	J. Evans	789	54.4	+11.9
Labour	B. Theadom*	491	33.8	–19.3
Labour	C. Nimmo*	405	27.9	–25.1
Liberal Democrats	J. King	194	13.4	N/A
Turnout		~1,451	32.4	–10.3
Registered electors		4,478		
Conservative gain from Labour				
Conservative gain from Labour				

=== Lawford & Manningtree ===
Lawford & Manningtree (2 seats)
Party	Candidate	Votes	%	±%
Labour	L. Randall*	569	50.9	–7.6
Labour	R. Ling*	511	45.7	–2.5
Conservative	R. Howell	359	32.1	+10.4
Conservative	K. Brazier	345	30.8	+14.4
Liberal Democrats	M. Dew	241	21.5	–4.8
Liberal Democrats	N. Roberts	212	19.0	±0.0
Turnout		932	23.2	–18.4
Registered electors		4,019		
Labour hold				
Labour hold				

=== Little Clacton ===
Little Clacton
Party	Candidate	Votes	%	±%
Conservative	P. De-Vaux Balbirnie	343	50.6	N/A
Independent	R. Mackintosh	335	49.4	N/A
Turnout		678	29.2	–1.5
Registered electors		2,266		
Conservative gain from Independent				

=== Mistley ===
Mistley
Party	Candidate	Votes	%	±%
Liberal Democrats	R. Smith*	352	64.9	+8.5
Conservative	A. Stock	104	19.2	+0.7
Labour	C. Lane	86	15.9	–9.1
Majority		248	45.7	+14.3
Turnout		542	29.3	–15.6
Registered electors		1,807		
Liberal Democrats hold		Swing	▲3.9	

=== Ramsey & Parkeston ===
Ramsey & Parkeston
Party	Candidate	Votes	%	±%
Labour	W. Elmer*	314	63.2	N/A
Independent	J. Brown	183	36.8	N/A
Majority		131	26.4	N/A
Turnout		497	28.1	N/A
Registered electors		1,759		
Labour hold				

=== Rush Green ===
Rush Green (3 seats)
Party	Candidate	Votes	%	±%
Labour	C. Baker*	599	58.2	–13.5
Labour	F. Baker*	572	55.6	–9.7
Labour	G. Mills*	516	50.1	–13.4
Conservative	G. Downing	365	35.5	+9.4
Conservative	V. Stone	330	32.1	N/A
Conservative	A. Rasch	325	31.6	N/A
Liberal Democrats	S. Shearing	125	12.1	N/A
Turnout		~1,029	24.0	–8.8
Registered electors		4,288		
Labour hold				
Labour hold				
Labour hold				

=== Southcliff ===
Southcliff
Party	Candidate	Votes	%	±%
Conservative	C. Jessop*	851	60.9	+17.3
Conservative	Pierre Oxley	835	59.7	+20.2
Independent	P. Vanner*	766	54.8	N/A
Labour	J. Ducksbury	359	25.7	–13.0
Liberal Democrats	M. Lonsdale	357	25.5	N/A
Labour	D. Aldis	352	25.2	–10.0
Labour	A. Bilverstone	352	25.2	–9.6
Turnout		~1,398	31.2	–7.5
Registered electors		4,481		
Conservative hold				
Conservative hold				
Independent gain from Labour				

=== St Bartholomews ===
St Bartholomews
Party	Candidate	Votes	%	±%
Independent	A. Tovey*	732	75.9	N/A
Independent	A. Cox	678	70.3	N/A
Labour	A. Alexander	166	17.2	N/A
Labour	A. Sargent	131	13.6	N/A
Liberal Democrats	R. Harper	57	5.9	N/A
Turnout		~965	34.2	N/A
Registered electors		2,821		
Independent gain from Residents				
Independent gain from Residents				

=== St. James ===
St. James (3 seats)
Party	Candidate	Votes	%	±%
Ind. Conservative	M. Hughes*	494	35.1	N/A
Labour	M. Morley-Souter	484	34.4	–15.0
Labour	R. Raby	478	33.9	–13.1
Labour	M. Rothwell*	476	33.8	–8.4
Ind. Conservative	I. Powell	417	29.6	N/A
Conservative	C. Griffiths	416	29.5	–2.7
Conservative	A. Overton	412	29.2	–0.6
Ind. Conservative	A. Roberts	333	23.6	N/A
Independent	T. McKean	202	14.3	N/A
Liberal Democrats	A. Wallis	174	12.3	–6.1
Turnout		~1,409	26.4	–8.4
Registered electors		5,336		
Ind. Conservative gain from Labour				
Labour hold				
Labour hold				

=== St. Johns ===
St. Johns (3 seats)
Party	Candidate	Votes	%	±%
Liberal Democrats	R. Bevan	798	48.5	+1.9
Liberal Democrats	M. Bargent	785	47.7	+3.9
Liberal Democrats	C. Harrison	638	38.7	+2.4
Labour	N. Jacobs*	490	29.8	–8.9
Labour	K. Aldis	469	28.5	–4.4
Labour	R. Fluin	407	24.7	–7.9
Conservative	M. Cossens	376	22.8	+5.9
Conservative	A. Owens	374	22.7	N/A
Conservative	V. Desor	325	19.7	N/A
Independent	P. Manning	278	16.9	N/A
Turnout		1,395	24.2	–15.5
Registered electors		5,763		
Liberal Democrats hold				
Liberal Democrats hold				
Liberal Democrats gain from Labour				

=== St Marys ===
St Marys (3 seats)
Party	Candidate	Votes	%	±%
Labour	T. Cook*	427	48.7	+2.3
Labour	S. Souter-Morley*	414	47.2	+1.2
Labour	G. Morgan*	410	46.8	+6.7
Conservative	J. Stephenson	258	29.4	+14.8
Conservative	W. Stone	245	27.9	N/A
Liberal Democrats	P. Miller	243	27.7	–8.7
Conservative	F. Woods	243	27.7	N/A
Liberal Democrats	L. Ridgwell	216	27.7	–7.7
Turnout		~877	22.7	–11.1
Registered electors		3,863		
Labour hold				
Labour hold				
Labour hold				

=== St Osyth & Point Clear ===
St Osyth & Point Clear (2 seats)
Party	Candidate	Votes	%	±%
Independent	J. White	585	54.9	N/A
Independent	M. Talbot	521	48.9	N/A
Labour	T. Osben*	388	36.4	+1.2
Labour	J. Ward*	371	34.8	+0.7
Turnout		~1,065	32.4	–8.1
Registered electors		3,287		
Independent gain from Labour				
Independent gain from Labour				

=== Tendring & Weeley ===
Tendring & Weeley
Party	Candidate	Votes	%	±%
Conservative	A. Johnston	237	45.2	+4.1
Independent	B. Rooney*	143	27.3	N/A
Labour	J. Chalkey	95	18.1	N/A
Liberal Democrats	O. Smith	49	9.4	–49.5
Turnout		524	27.2	–9.1
Registered electors		1,882		
Conservative gain from Liberal Democrats				

=== Walton ===
Walton
Party	Candidate	Votes	%	±%
Conservative	M. Page	1,228	66.1	+23.2
Conservative	C. Turner*	1,209	65.0	+23.7
Conservative	J. King	1,190	64.0	+23.7
Labour	S. Bowles	602	32.4	–17.2
Labour	P. Kemo	599	32.2	–13.7
Labour	E. Grainger	593	31.9	–10.7
Turnout		~1,859	34.1	–7.0
Registered electors		5,452		
Conservative gain from Labour				
Conservative hold				
Conservative gain from Labour				

== By-elections ==
=== Rush Green ===
Rush Green by-election: 20 July 2000
Party	Candidate	Votes	%	±%
Labour		473	52.3	–2.7
Conservative		324	35.8	+2.3
Liberal Democrats		108	11.9	+0.4
Majority		149	16.5	N/A
Turnout		905	21.0	–3.0
Registered electors		4,310		
Labour hold		Swing	▼2.5	

=== St Marys ===
St Marys by-election: 19 April 2001
Party	Candidate	Votes	%	±%
Labour		374	50.7	+4.7
Conservative		174	23.6	–4.2
Other		95	12.9	N/A
Liberal Democrats		94	12.8	–13.4
Majority		200	27.1	N/A
Turnout		737	19.0	–3.7
Registered electors		3,879		
Labour hold		Swing	▲4.5	

=== Brightlingsea East ===
Brightlingsea East by-election: 2 August 2001
Party	Candidate	Votes	%	±%
Liberal Democrats		188	39.4	+8.7
Labour		165	34.6	+1.5
Conservative		124	26.0	N/A
Majority		23	4.8	N/A
Turnout		477	15.0	–22.2
Registered electors		3,180		
Liberal Democrats gain from Labour		Swing	▲3.6	

=== St Bartholomews ===
St Bartholomews by-election: 29 November 2001
Party	Candidate	Votes	%	±%
Independent		332	51.1	–25.5
Labour		238	36.6	+19.2
Conservative		80	12.3	N/A
Majority		94	14.5	N/A
Turnout		650	22.0	–12.2
Registered electors		2,955		
Independent hold		Swing	▼22.4	

=== Alresford, Thorrington & Frating ===
Alresford, Thorrington & Frating by-election: 7 March 2002
Party	Candidate	Votes	%	±%
Liberal Democrats		347	44.0	N/A
Conservative		281	35.7	–13.6
Labour		160	20.3	–30.4
Majority		66	8.3	N/A
Turnout		788	26.1	–7.3
Registered electors		3,019		
Liberal Democrats gain from Labour				

=== St Johns ===
St Johns by-election: 13 June 2002
Party	Candidate	Votes	%	±%
Liberal Democrats		780	46.0	+4.9
Conservative		514	30.3	+10.9
Labour		403	23.7	–1.5
Majority		266	15.7	N/A
Turnout		1,697	28.2	+4.0
Registered electors		6,018		
Liberal Democrats hold		Swing	▼3.0	
