= Bernard Gascoigne =

Italian military adventurer and diplomat

Sir Bernard Gascoigne FRS
- Bernardo Guasconi
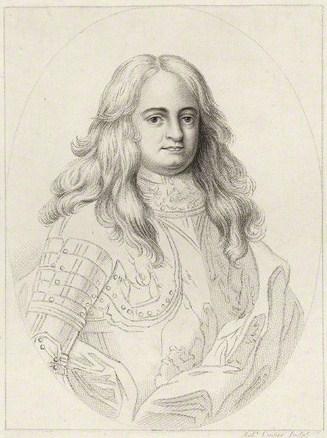
- Bernard Gascoigne, engraving by Robert Cooper
- Born: 1614; Florence
- Died: 10 January 1687 (aged 72–73); Haymarket, London
- Burial place: St Martin-in-the-Fields
- Military career
- Allegiance: Royalist
- Conflicts: Thirty Years War; Piedmontese Civil War; Turin; Wars of the Three Kingdoms; Colchester

Sir Bernard Gascoigne (Italian: Bernardo Guasconi), April/May 1614 to 10 January 1687, was an Italian mercenary from Florence in Tuscany, who served with the Royalist army during the Wars of the Three Kingdoms. Captured at Colchester in August 1648, he was initially condemned to death but released, since Parliament wished to avoid antagonising a foreign power. After the 1660 Stuart Restoration, he held a number of minor diplomatic roles and died in London on 10 January 1687.

== Early life ==
Bernard Gascoigne, or "Bernardo Guasconi", was born April/May 1614 in Florence, son of Giovanni Batista di Bernardo Guasconi (d. 1614) and Clemenza di Lorenzo Altoviti (d.1634). His father died when he was four months old, and Gascoigne was brought up by his maternal uncle, Alessandro Altoviti. He became one of the men-at-arms in the service of the Grand Duke of Tuscany, and distinguished himself in an action in Casentino. He then served in Lombardy, Piedmont, and Germany.

== In England ==
Gascoigne met Henry Neville on his 1643–4 Grand Tour in Italy. Coming to England, he took up arms for Charles I, and obtained a commission in the regiment of horse of Colonel Richard Neville, Henry's elder brother.

On 4 August 1644, when the king was at Liskeard, he surprised and captured a party of parliamentarian officers in Lord Mohun's house, which was within two miles of the Earl of Essex's headquarters. In 1647 he drew up for the instruction of Ferdinand II, Grand Duke of Tuscany, an account of recent events in England.

Gascoigne had the command of one of the regiments of horse which took possession of Colchester in Essex on 12 June 1648, leading to the siege of Colchester. He took part in the ineffectual attempt made on 15 July to break through the beleaguering forces, and was taken prisoner when the town was surrendered to Thomas Fairfax on 28 August. He was condemned to be shot on the following day with Sir Charles Lucas and Sir George Lisle. His life was spared at the last moment, because the council of war feared the long-term consequences.

On 3 December 1649 Charles II renewed to him a grant of a pension, originally made to Gascoigne by Charles I, which for the time could not be paid. In 1650 Gascoigne was at Florence. He was in England again soon after the Restoration, and in or about September 1660 he petitioned the king that in lieu of his pension he might become the tenant of the Steel Yard in London, promising to dispose of the tenements to English merchants.

A bill for Gascoigne's naturalisation was read a first time in the House of Lords on 26 June 1661, but was not further proceeded with. On October of that year he received some royal grants; and a patent of denization in the name of Sir Bernard Gascoigne of Florence (he was knighted). In October 1662 he had another royal grant in lieu of his pension, and further moves were made to see he had payment.

== Return to Italy ==
Gascoigne was given a pass to Tuscany for himself, his servants, and nine horses, on 4 January 1664. In 1664 he wrote from Florence to Secretary Henry Bennet, about an intelligence contact at Venice, a year, and suggesting Vittorio Siri as a source on the French court. When Sir John Finch went to Florence in 1665 as English minister, he was entertained in Gascoigne's house.

== Second period in England ==
Gascoigne had a pass to return to England on 11 March 1667, and on 20 June 1667 he was admitted a Fellow of the Royal Society of London. He was the main contact for Paolo Falconieri and Lorenzo Magalotti on their scientific visit to London, later that year.

A royal warrant was issued for the assignment of the yearly pension granted to him in 1663. Gascoigne was in constant attendance on Cosimo, Prince of Tuscany, during his visit to England in 1669. In the following year he took part in a frolic at Audley End, where the queen, the Duchess of Richmond, and the Duchess of Buckingham disguised themselves as country lasses and went to see the fair.

== Mission to Vienna ==
In 1672 Gascoigne was sent to Vienna as English envoy to conduct the negotiations for a marriage of James, Duke of York with Claudia Felicitas of Austria, daughter of Ferdinand Charles, Archduke of Austria. Eventually the negotiations were broken off, and in May 1673 orders were sent to Gascoigne to take his leave from the court.

== Death ==
Gascoigne received two sums from the royal bounty in 1686. He died in the Haymarket, in the parish of St Martin-in-the-Fields, London, on 10 January 1687.

== Works ==
Gascoigne wrote:

- Relazione della Storia d' Inghilterra del mdcxlvii, scritta dal Colonello e Residente in Londra Bernardino Guasconi ed inviata a Ferdinando II in Firenze; published Florence, 1886, with a brief notice of the author by Gargano T. Gargani.
- A Description of Germany: its Government, Manner of Assembling Diets, Ceremony of Electing and Crowning the King of the Romans: as also an Account of their present Imperial Majesties Houshold. This was sent to Charles II in 1672, when Gascoigne was envoy at Vienna. It was printed in Tom Brown's Miscellanea Aulica, or a Collection of State Treaties, London, 1702.
