= J. Horace Round =

British historian and genealogist (1854–1928)

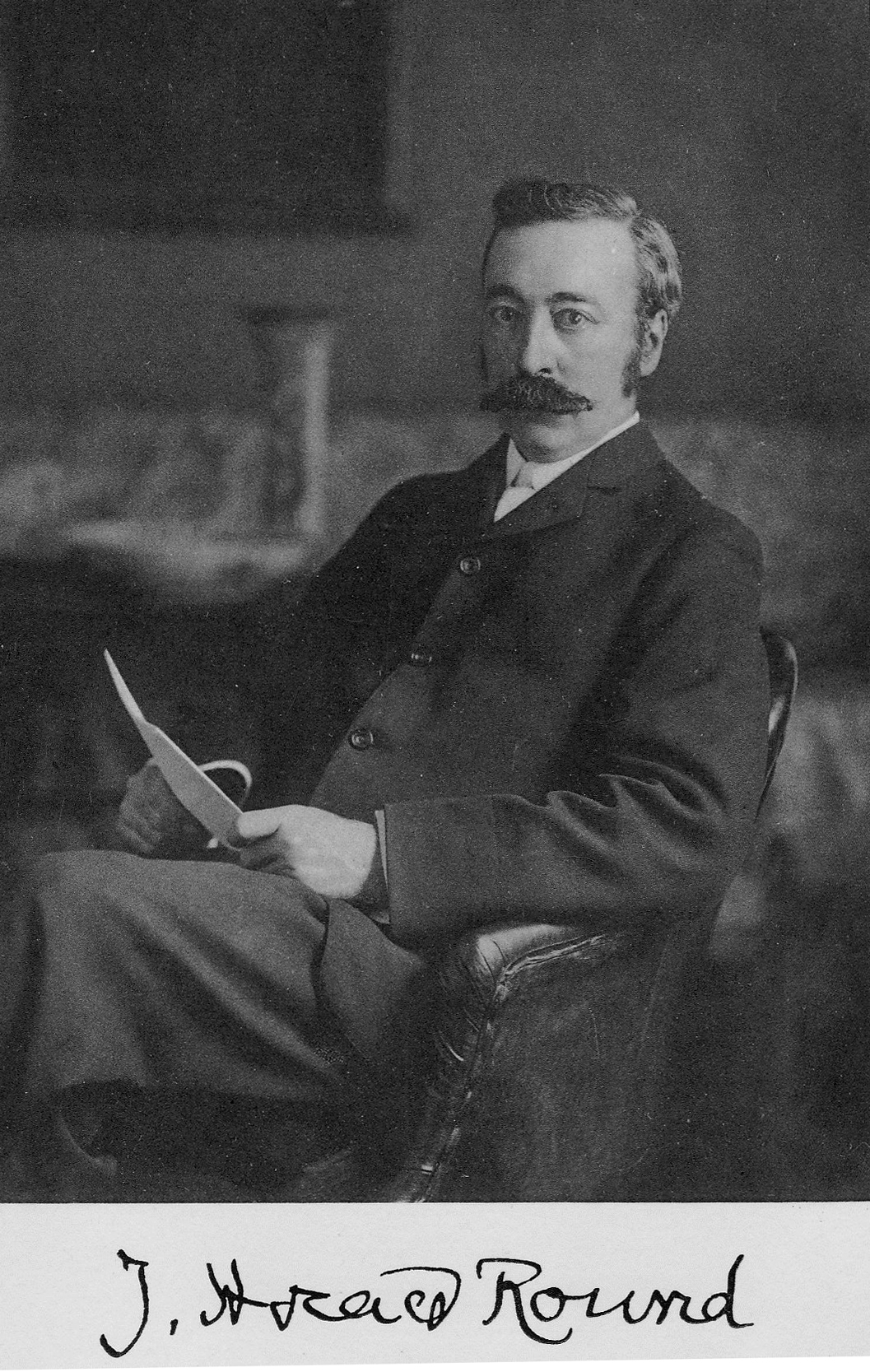
J. Horace Round

(John) Horace Round (22 February 1854 – 24 June 1928) was a historian and genealogist of the English medieval period. He translated the portion of Domesday Book (1086) covering Essex into English. As an expert in the history of the British peerage, he was appointed honorary historical adviser to the Crown.

== Biography ==
=== Family and early life ===
Round was born on 22 February 1854 in Hove, Sussex. His parents were John Round (died 1887), a barrister, of West Bergholt, Essex, and Laura, the daughter of the poet Horatio Smith (died 1864). His family history appears in Burke's Landed Gentry, a publication he regularly criticised for its inaccuracies, although there is no reason to doubt the accuracy of the entry for his family. His birthplace, 15 Brunswick Terrace, is marked with a blue plaque.

Following his childhood education, he went up to Balliol College, Oxford in 1874, where he read for a degree in Modern History. In the final examinations in 1879, he obtained a bachelor of arts with first class honours; he qualified for an M.A. in 1881.

Though a native of Sussex, he had many interests in Essex, and was both deputy lieutenant and lord of the manor of Bergholt Hall, West Bergholt in that county. A relative owned Colchester Castle, and his grandfather John had been a member of parliament in Essex. He never married.

Round was a cousin to the Round family of Birch Hall, Essex, members of which included Charles Gray Round, James Round, and Charles Round.

=== Work as a genealogist and writer ===
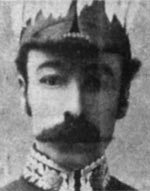
Horace Round wearing ceremonial attire of deputy lieutenant of Essex

He contributed to many publications (most notably The Complete Peerage, the Dictionary of National Biography (first edition) and the Victoria County History (VCH)) and was the author of several significant works. His translation and discussion of the Essex Domesday (VCH Essex, vol. 1) is widely regarded as a masterpiece, and is of national significance; this contrasts with his books, where he often indulged in castigating his contemporaries. He pursued disputes with other academics vigorously, and on more than one occasion, the level of acrimony was sufficiently high that the editor was forced to close correspondence on the subject. His feud with Hubert Hall relating to the publication in 1897 of the 13th-century Red Book of the Exchequer (on which Round had originally been co-editor) became particularly acerbic. Round's writings also betray antisemitic sympathies. Writing of the Aliens Act 1905, he referred to:

... that wise Act which was bitterly opposed by certain persons who seem to imagine that England exists, not for the English, but for the Russian Jew. There are immigrants with whom we can dispense. Great, far too great, as is now the power of the purse, the government of England is not yet - to use a familiar and a painful phrase - "in the hands of the Jews".

Round's disputes in a normally gentle academic area honed his analytic skills. He was recognised as a leading authority on medieval and later genealogy and was awarded an honorary LLD by the University of Edinburgh in February 1905. He also served as President of the Essex Archaeological Society.

He advised the Court of Claims and Committee for Privileges of the House of Lords on matters concerning the coronation of King Edward VII. His book on this topic, The King's Serjeants and Officers of State, with their Coronation Services was published in 1911, the year of King George V's coronation. An expert in British peerage history and law, he was appointed Honorary Historical Adviser to the Crown in peerage cases in 1914 (a post from which he resigned in 1922).

=== Illness and death ===
Round contracted a chronic illness some time after coming down from Oxford, and his handwriting progressively deteriorated over the years. He died on 24 June 1928 in Hove. A memoir by his friend and colleague William Page was included in a posthumously published volume of writings, and a biography by W. Raymond Powell was published in 2001. Both contain full bibliographies of Round's work. At the time of his death, he had more than sixty contributions to Essex Archaeology and History awaiting publication.

== Legacy ==
=== Papers and correspondence ===
Correspondence between Round and various other historians is available in the archives at Senate House Library. Additional papers are in the Essex Record Office, West Sussex Record Office, Warwickshire County Record Office, Staffordshire and Stoke-on-Trent Archive Service, British Library, Bodleian Library, Edinburgh University Library, Glasgow University Library, Manchester University Library, Reading University Library, Yale University Library, Colchester Library, Sussex Archaeological Society and The National Archives.

=== Publications ===
- Geoffrey de Mandeville (1892)
- Feudal England (1895)
- The Commune of London (1899)
- Calendar of documents preserved in France (1899)
- Studies in Peerage and Family History (1901)
- Peerage and Pedigree: Studies in Peerage Law and Family History (1910)
- The King’s Serjeants and Officers of State, with their Coronation Services (1911)
- Contributions to Domesday Studies, the Dictionary of National Biography, The Complete Peerage, Victoria County History (with William Page), the English Historical Review and Archæological Transactions
- Family Origins and Other Studies, ed. Page, William (1930)
