= Hollytrees Museum =

Local museum in Colchester, Essex, England

Coordinates: 51.8901°N 0.9044°E

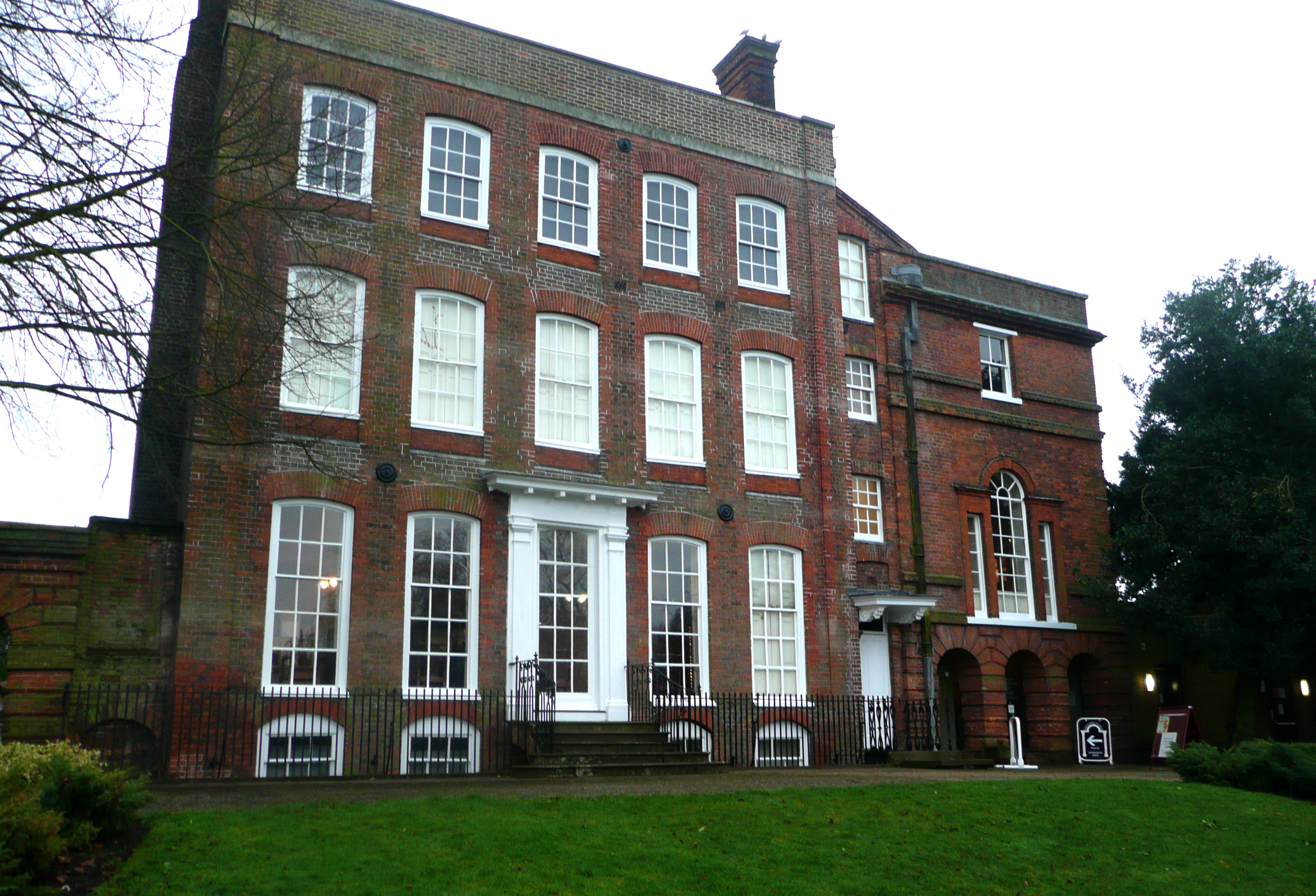

Hollytrees Museum is a publicly owned museum in Castle Park in the centre of Colchester, close to Colchester Castle. It is situated in an eighteenth-century house ("Hollytrees"), which was used as a private residence until 1929, when it became a museum.

The first house on the site, known as "Symnells" after its owner, was later bought by the Shaw family, and passed from John Shaw to John Shaw III and John Shaw IV. When he died a minor, the house passed into chancery; his mother Jane Lessingham bought it but soon died. The modern house was constructed in 1718 for Elizabeth Cornelisen, who had bought the site from Lessingham's executors and promptly tore down the existing structure in poor condition. Construction commenced on 10 May 1718 at a cost of £630 plus brickwork and tiling; the total refurbishment was estimated to have cost £2,000. She died soon after, bequeathing the house to her niece, Sarah Creffeild (née Webster), who left it to her second husband Charles Gray. It was, at that time, known as "Esqr Creffield's [sic]". Possession of the house reverted to the Creffeilds; through Thamer Creffeild to James Round, who left to his brother Charles, who left it to his son Charles Gray Round, who left to it to his nephew James Round. The Rounds finally sold it to the Corporation of Colchester in 1922, a purchase paid for privately by Viscount Cowdray and his wife. It became a museum in 1929.

The house is known as Hollytrees after two holly trees planted in the grounds by Charles Gray in 1729 and is now a museum serving the centre of Colchester and specialising in local history. It also houses Colchester's Visitor Information Centre. It is a grade I listed building.

In 2011, the collection at Hollytrees was expanded with the addition of a number of antique clocks, taken from the closing Tymperleys Clock Museum.

In 2026, Hollytrees Museum opened a display of a large theropod dinosaur fossil, nicknamed "Juliasaurus"; the first dinosaur fossil to be displayed at the museum.

== Ownership ==
The new house, constructed in 1718, was passed down through the family, as described above. Only those greyed out did not at some time own Hollytrees. It was finally sold by Lt. Col. Charles Round in 1922.

Elizabeth Cornelisen	John Webster
Ralph Creffeild (1)	Sarah Webster	Charles Gray (2)	Mary Wilbraham
Peter Creffeild
Thamer Creffeild	James Round
James Round	Charles Round
Charles Gray Round	The Rev. James Round
James Round
Lt. Col. Charles Round
