= Thomas Lucas (Royalist) =

Sir Thomas Lucas
- Lucas family arms

Privy Council of Ireland
- In office 1642–1646

Personal details
- Born: 1598
- Died: Before October 1649 Lexden, Essex, England
- Spouse: Mary (Anne) Byron (1629–1649)
- Children: Anne (1629–1670); Charles (1631–1688); Thomas (1635–1679); William (1640–1690); John (1647–1680)
- Education: Pembroke College, Cambridge

Military service
- Allegiance: Royalist
- Years of service: 1625–1643
- Rank: Lieutenant General of Horse
- Battles/wars: Eighty Years War; Bishops' Wars; Irish Confederate Wars; Kilrush; New Ross (WIA)

Sir Thomas Lucas (1598 – before October 1649), was a professional soldier from Lexden, just outside Colchester in Essex, England, who served with the Dutch States Army in the Eighty Years War and later fought in the Irish Confederate Wars.

The eldest son of a prominent Essex family, Lucas took up a military career after being excluded from inheriting the family estates due to his illegitimacy. He took part in the 1639 to 1640 Bishops' Wars and was subsequently made General of Horse in Ireland. After the Irish Rebellion broke out in October 1641, James Butler, 1st Duke of Ormond, appointed him to the Privy Council of Ireland.

Both his brothers served with the Royalist army during the First English Civil War but Lucas remained in Ireland and helped negotiate the September 1643 Ceasefire or "Cessation" with the Irish Catholic Confederacy, which allowed Protestant Irish troops to be transferred to England. Shortly after Charles I surrendered in June 1646, he returned to England and retired to his estates in Lexden after paying a fine.

He took no part in the 1648 Second English Civil War, even though his younger brother Charles Lucas (1613–1648) led the Royalist defence of Colchester and was executed after it surrendered. He died sometime before October 1649.

== Personal details ==
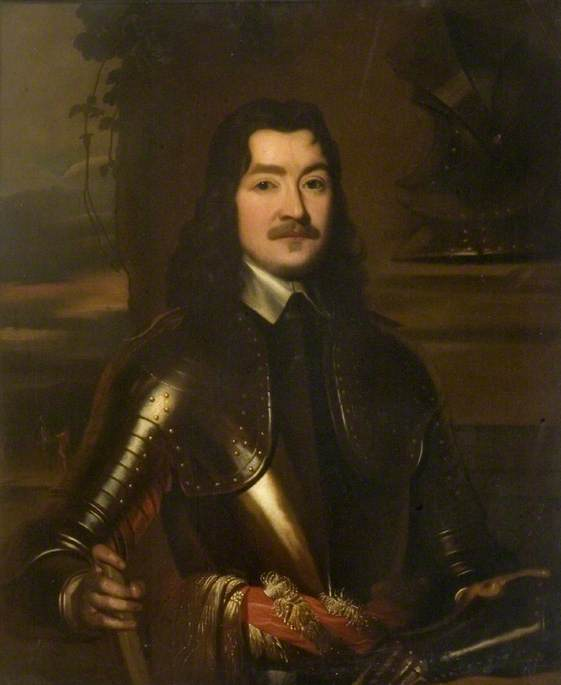
Thomas' younger brother, Charles Lucas, a Royalist martyr executed in 1648

Thomas Lucas was born in 1598, eldest son of Sir Thomas Lucas (1573–1625) and his then mistress and future wife Elizabeth Leighton (died 1647). Shortly before the birth, Sir Thomas fled abroad after killing a member of the Cecil family in a duel. He remained in exile until pardoned by James VI and I and the marriage did not take place until August 1604, making Thomas technically illegitimate. This meant his younger brother Sir John (1606–1671) inherited the family estates, although in 1612 his father purchased him a manor near Lexden, outside Colchester.

In addition to John, Lucas had another brother, Charles Lucas (1613–1648) and five sisters, including Mary (1608–1646), wife of Sir Peter Killigrew (1593–1668) with whom she had a son, Anne (1614–?), Elizabeth (1612–1691), who married Sir William Walter (1604–1675), and Catherine (1605–1702), wife of Sir Edmund Pye (1607–1673). The youngest was Margaret (1623–1673), a prolific author and scientist who in 1645 married William Cavendish, 1st Duke of Newcastle (1593–1676), formerly Royalist commander in Northern England during the First English Civil War.

In January 1629, Thomas married Mary Byron (1612–1650), sister of John Byron, 1st Baron Byron and they had five children together before his death in October 1649; Anne (1629–1670), Charles (1631–1688), Thomas (1635–1679), William (1640–1690) and John (1647–1680). After the death of Sir John Lucas in 1671, Charles inherited the family estates and title of Baron Lucas.

== Career ==
Lucas graduated from Pembroke College, Cambridge in 1615 and as with other members of the gentry who for various reasons had no prospect of inheriting the family estates, he followed a military career. Like many contemporaries from England and Scotland who later fought in the Wars of the Three Kingdoms, such as Nicholas Slanning, Sir Thomas Fairfax and George Monck, he supported the Protestant Dutch Republic in the Eighty Years War with Spain. By 1627, he was captain of a troop of cavalry in the Dutch States Army and was knighted by King Charles I on 14 April 1628.

From 1629 to 1640, Charles ruled without Parliament, and as the 1630s progressed, political and religious disputes with his opponents in all three kingdoms grew increasingly bitter. In 1638, the Covenanters took control of government in Scotland and both sides began preparations for military conflict. As part of a policy of securing the allegiance of professional soldiers like Lucas, in December 1638, the Chief governor of Ireland, Thomas Wentworth, 1st Earl of Strafford, suggested giving him a position in the Irish Army. This was intended to prevent Presbyterian settlers in Ulster supporting their co-religionists in Scotland.

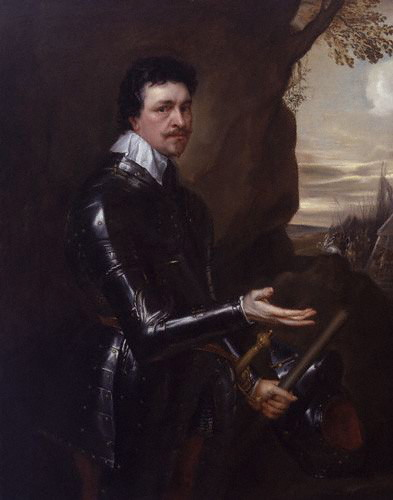
The Earl of Strafford, whose influence led to Lucas being appointed General of Horse in Ireland

As Royalists in a county dominated by supporters of Parliament, the Essex-based Lucas family was of greater significance than it might appear and at the same time his brother John joined the newly-established household of the eight year old Prince of Wales. Although Charles approved Strafford's recommendation, Lucas was still a member of the Dutch army and played no part in the first of the Bishops' Wars in 1639. In February 1640, he was appointed General of Horse in Ireland and during the second Bishops' War commanded a regiment in Yorkshire.

Following the execution of Strafford in May 1641 and the outbreak of the Irish Rebellion in October, James Butler, 1st Duke of Ormond, assumed command of Protestant forces in Ireland and appointed Lucas to the Irish Privy Council. Lucas took part in operations to recover territory lost to the rebels, including the Battle of Kilrush on 15 April 1642, before the outbreak of the First English Civil War in August ended the flow of reinforcements and money from England. He suffered a severe head wound at the Battle of New Ross on 18 March 1643, an injury his sister later suggested contributed to his death in 1649.

While most of Ormond's officers wanted to remain neutral in the dispute between Royalists and Parliamentarians, Charles was anxious to use their troops to help him win the war in England, and Lucas helped negotiate a Ceasefire or "Cessation" with the Irish Catholic Confederacy in September 1643. Lucas stayed in Ireland before returning to England in October 1646, when he applied to the Committee for Compounding with Delinquents, who restored his estates for a fine of £637. Although his younger brother Charles was executed after the Siege of Colchester, Lucas himself did not participate in the 1648 Second English Civil War and died at home in Lexden before October 1649.

== Sources ==
- Cavendish, Margaret (1886). Firth, Charles Harding (ed.). The Life of William Cavendish, Duke of Newcastle, to which is Added the True Relation of My Birth, Breeding and Life. JC Nimmo.
- Donagan, Barbara (2004). "Lucas, Sir Thomas (1597/98 to 1648/49)". Oxford Dictionary of National Biography (online ed.). Oxford University Press. doi:10.1093/ref:odnb/17143. (Subscription, Wikipedia Library access or UK public library membership required.)
- Dunthorne, Hugh (2013). Britain and the Dutch Revolt 1560–1700. Cambridge University Press. ISBN 978-0521837477.
- Dunthorne, Hugh (2017). Hermans, Theo; Salverda, Reinier (eds.). The Dutch Revolt in English political culture 1585-1660 in From Revolt to Riches: Culture and History of the Low Countries, 1500–1700. UCL Press. ISBN 978-1910634875.
- Radcliffe, Sir George, ed. (1739). The Earl of Strafforde's Letters and Dispatches, with an Essay Towards His Life, Volume 2. William Knowler.
- Royle, Trevor (2006) [2004]. Civil War: The Wars of the Three Kingdoms 1638–1660. Abacus. ISBN 978-0-349-11564-1.
