= Sir Edmund Pye, 1st Baronet =

English landowner, Scrivener and politician

Sir Edmund Pye, 1st Baronet (c. 1607 – 1673) was an English landowner and politician, who sat in the House of Commons from 1661 to 1673.

Pye was the son of Edmund Pye of St Martin, Ludgate, London, scrivener, and his wife Martha, daughter of Thomas Allen haberdasher of Ludgate. A wealthy man, his father bought the manor of Leckhampstead, Buckinghamshire in 1628.

On 6 May 1635, Pye married Catherine Lucas, daughter of Sir Thomas Lucas (1573–1625) and Elizabeth Leighton (d. 1647). Her younger sister Margaret, later Duchess of Newcastle, later recalled that she often stayed with 'my sister Pye' when she was in London.

Pye had married into a staunchly royalist family, his brothers-in-law John, Thomas and Charles all fought for the king in the English Civil War. In recognition of his own support for the king in the period preceding the war he was created a baronet on 23 April 1641 and knighted at Whitehall four days later. Once hostilities broke out, he joined the king at Oxford. Following the death of the heavily indebted Thomas, 6th baron Windsor in 1642, Pye purchased the manor of Bradenham, Buckinghamshire.

After the Civil War, he was voted a delinquent by Parliament and fined £3,065. He completed payment of his fine in 1654. In 1661 he was elected Member of Parliament for Wycombe, the nearest town to Bradenham, and was comparatively active on committees.

He had two daughters by his wife Catherine. In 1678 Elizabeth(d. 1713) married, as his second wife, Charles West (1645–84), eldest son of Charles West, 5th Baron De La Warr. West died before his father without issue and was buried at Bradenham. In 1662 Martha married John Lovelace, 3rd Baron Lovelace. Their only son having died before his father, their heir was their daughter Martha, who inherited Bradenham from the Pyes and the title Baroness Wentworth from her paternal grandmother. She was the second wife of the wealthy politician and shipowner Henry Johnson.

Pye died at the age of about 65 and was buried on 28 April 1673 at Bradenham, when the baronetcy became extinct.

Parliament of England
Preceded by Edmund Petty; Richard Browne	Member of Parliament for Wycombe; 1661; With: Sir John Borlase, Bt 1661–1673; Sir John Borlase, Bt 1673	Succeeded by Robert Sawyer; Sir John Borlase, Bt
Baronetage of England
New creation	Baronet (of Leckhampstead); 1641–1673	Extinct
