= Ralph Creffeild (born 1687) =

Ralph Creffeild JP (often incorrectly Creffield; 1687 – 12 December 1723 in Colchester) was a barrister and dignitary in Colchester, Essex, England, from a family of wealthy drapers and landowners.

Creffeild was born in 1687, the second son of Sir Ralph Creffeild, and the only one of his children to survive into adulthood, though he did not outlive his father. Educated at the Merchant Taylor's School, in 1711 he married Sarah Webster, the daughter of John Webster of Cornhill and later Barbados. Creffeild's marriage settlement described him as being of the Inner Temple, and thus it can be surmised that he was at that time already employed as a barrister. In 1717/18 the couple moved to a new house in the centre of Colchester, Hollytrees, which had recently been constructed for Sarah's aunt. It was, at that time, known as "Esqr Creffield's [sic]". At some point he also purchased Mose Hall in Ardleigh, where his father already had a substantial estate.

Creffeild soon became a justice of the peace for the county of Essex and an Alderman of Colchester. It is likely the couple also had a home in West Mersea, since two of their children were baptised there. Creffeild died on 12 December 1723 and was buried at St. James' Church in Colchester. Sarah married again after his death to Charles Gray, but, since they had no children, the estates reverted through Ralph's surviving children, Peter, Hannah (later married to George Wegg, another wealthy landowner at that time), and Sarah. Eight other children had died in infancy, including two Ralphs and a Joseph.
