= Charles Lucas =

English army officer

Lieutenant-General Sir Charles Lucas
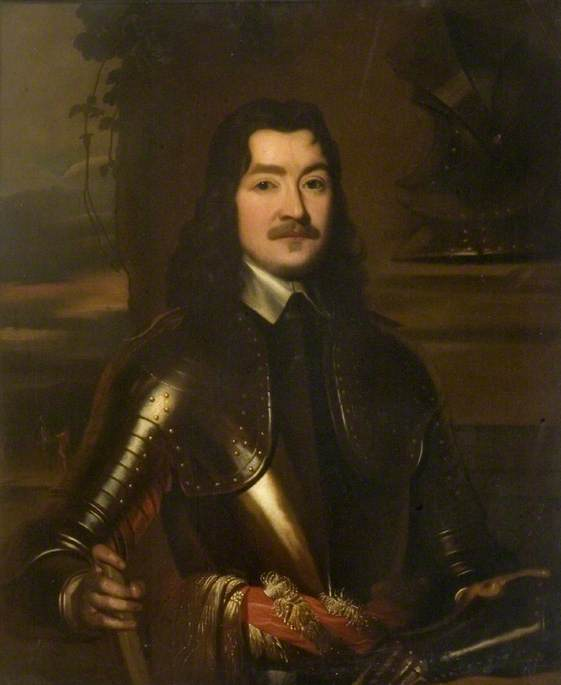
- Portrait of Lucas

Personal details
- Born: 1613 Colchester, Essex
- Died: 28 August 1648 (aged 34–35) Colchester, Essex
- Resting place: St Giles's Church, Colchester (now St Giles Masonic Centre)
- Education: Christ's College, Cambridge

Military service
- Battles/wars: Eighty Years War; Wars of the Three Kingdoms; Powick Bridge; Marston Moor; Berkeley Castle; Stow-on-the-Wold; Siege of Colchester

Sir Charles Lucas (1613 — 28 August 1648) was a member of the landed gentry from Essex. A Royalist cavalry leader during the First English Civil War, in March 1646 he swore not to fight against Parliament again, but broke this promise when the Second English Civil War began in 1648. Lucas was executed following the Siege of Colchester in August 1648, and became a Royalist martyr after the 1660 Stuart Restoration.

Royalist statesman and historian Edward Hyde, 1st Earl of Clarendon, described Lucas as "rough, proud, uncultivated and morose", but "a gallant man to look upon and follow".

== Personal details ==
Charles Lucas was born in Colchester, Essex in 1613, sixth child and third son of Sir Thomas Lucas (1573–1625) and his wife Elizabeth (died 1647). His eldest brother Thomas (1598–1649) was technically illegitimate, and so the second brother John (1606–1671) inherited the family estates.

Lucas also had five sisters, Mary (1608–1646), wife of Sir Peter Killigrew (1593–1668) with whom she had a son, Anne (1614–?), Elizabeth (1612–1691), who married Sir William Walter (1604–1675), and Catherine (1605–1702), wife of Sir Edmund Pye (1607–1673). His youngest sister Margaret (1623–1673), was a prolific author and scientist who in 1645 married William Cavendish, 1st Duke of Newcastle (1593–1676), Royalist commander in Northern England from 1642 to 1644.

== Career ==
As a young man, Lucas served under his brother John in the Eighty Years War, and during the 1639 to 1640 Bishops' Wars commanded a troop of cavalry in the army of Charles I, being knighted in 1639. When the First English Civil War began in August 1642, Lucas joined the Royalist army, and was wounded at the Battle of Powick Bridge, the first major engagement of the conflict.

Early in 1643, Lucas raised a regiment of horse, with which he defeated Middleton at Padbury on 1 July. In January 1644, he commanded the forces attacking Nottingham, and soon afterwards, on the recommendation of Prince Rupert, he was made lieutenant-general of the Duke of Newcastle's Northern army. When Newcastle was shut up in York, Lucas and the cavalry remained in the open country, and when Rupert's relieving army crossed the hills into Yorkshire he was quickly joined by Newcastle's squadrons.

At Marston Moor in July 1644, Lucas swept Sir Thomas Fairfax's horse from the field, but the battle was a decisive Parliamentarian victory and he was captured during the fighting. Exchanged for Parliamentary prisoners during the winter, in December 1645 he defended Berkeley Castle against forces led by Thomas Rainsborough. The garrison surrendered after being granted free passage to the nearest Royalist territory, and Lucas became lieutenant-general of the remnants of the Royalist cavalry. In March 1646, he was captured once again at Stow-on-the-Wold, the last major battle of the First Civil War.

Lucas was released after promising not to bear arms against Parliament again, and in March 1648 compounded for the return of his estates after swearing an oath of loyalty. When the Second English Civil War began in May 1648, he ignored both agreements and took a prominent part in the seizure of Colchester; following a three-month siege, the town surrendered on 28 August 1648.

== Execution & burial ==
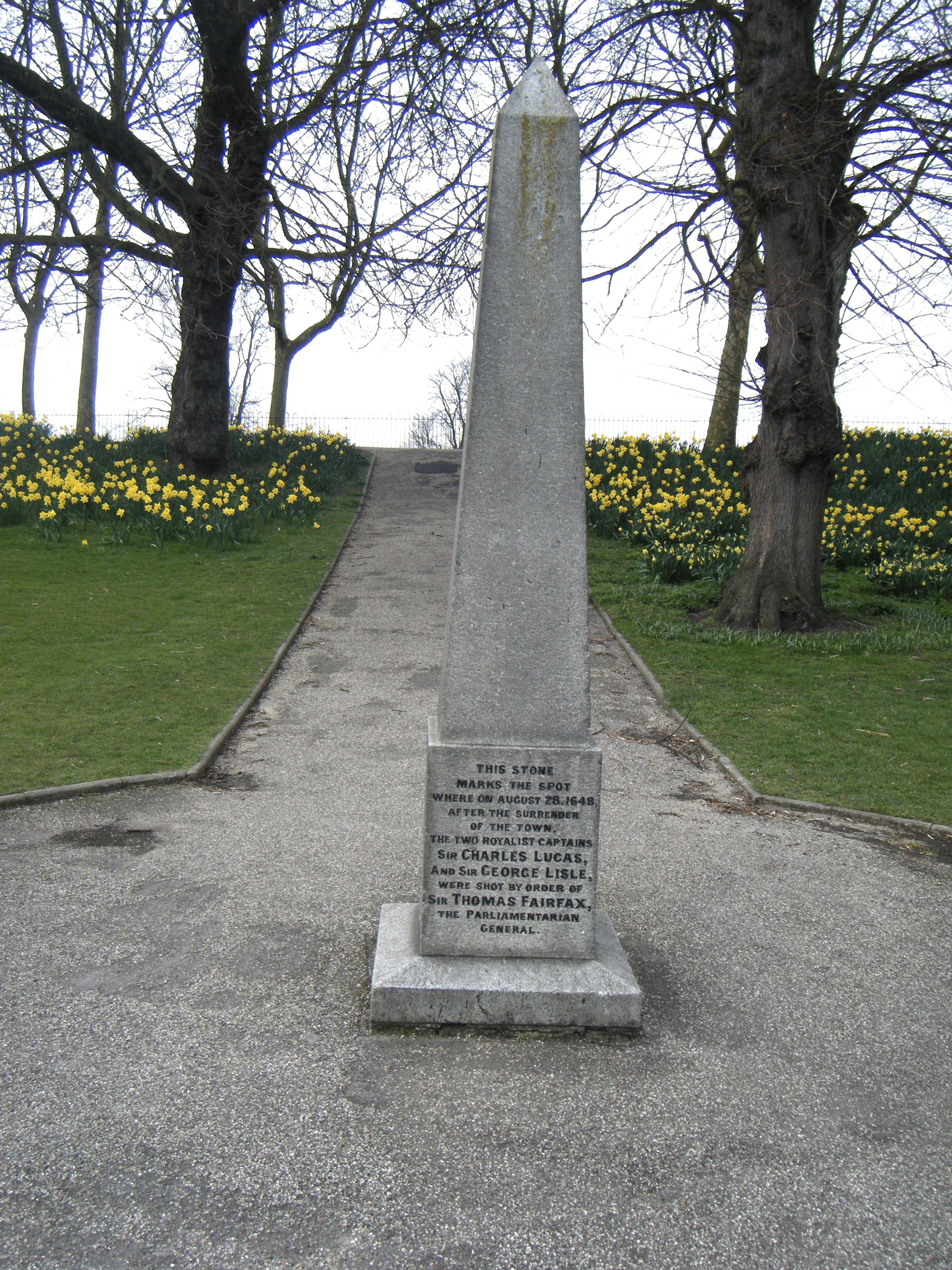
Lucas and Lisle monument, Colchester Castle

On 20 June 1648, Parliament had declared all those who took part in the Second Civil War were guilty of high treason. When Colchester capitulated, the Royalist commanders, including Lucas, Lord Norwich, Sir Arthur Capel, Henry Hastings, Sir George Lisle and Bernard Gascoigne were obliged to "render themselves to mercy", while the rest of the garrison were given "quarter". These terms had specific and well-known military meanings; prisoners granted "quarter" were guaranteed their lives, "mercy" left it to the discretion of the victorious commander. The ferocity of the siege meant many senior officers of the New Model Army were in no mood to pardon those they considered responsible for a second and unnecessary round of bloodshed. This was especially true of Royalists like Lucas who had already been pardoned once before.

As members of the nobility, Norwich, Hastings and Capel were sent to the Tower of London for trial; Capel was executed in March 1649, while Norwich and Hastings were exiled. Lucas, Lisle and Gascoigne were condemned to death by a court martial, a sentence Henry Ireton justified by reference to the ruling by Parliament in June. Although Lucas knew he had broken the terms of his parole and did not expect mercy a second time, he argued that he had acted as "a true subject to my king and the laws of the kingdom" and "fought with a commission from those that were my sovereigns, and from that commission I must justify my action". His fate was sealed when two soldiers who had previously served in the Parliamentarian garrison of Stinchcombe, Gloucestershire gave evidence that after their surrender in 1645, Lucas had ordered the execution of over 20 men. (Note: Known as the "Stinchcombe Quarter", other sources attribute this action to Prince Rupert of the Rhine)

Since Gascoigne, or Bernardo Guasconi, was from Florence, he was reprieved by Parliament, which was wary of antagonising a foreign power, but Lucas and Lisle were executed by firing squad on 28 August 1648 in the castle yard at Colchester, and interred in the Lucas family vault within St Giles's Church. Twelve years later, on 7 June 1661, the two men were reburied in an elaborate ceremony, and a stone placed by John Lucas, 1st Baron Lucas on their tombs. The inscription stated they were "by the command of Sir Thomas Fairfax in cold blood barbarously murdered", although in reality Fairfax had acted legally and in accordance with the terms of the capitulation.

A monument to Lucas and Lisle was erected in Castle Park in 1892.

== Contemporary reputation ==
Lucas was reputed to be one of the best cavalry leaders in the king's army. Even Clarendon, who claimed he was "rough, proud, uncultivated, morose" and intolerable off the battlefield, also described him as "very brave in his person, and in a day of battle a gallant man to look upon and follow". According to his sister, Lucas "naturally had a practical genius to the warlike arts, as natural poets have to poetry, but his life was cut off before he could arrive at the true perfection thereof". He left a Treatise of the Arts of War, but being written in cipher it was never published. To his military gifts Lucas added a devotion to the king's cause, which he sometimes expressed in singularly high-flown and poetical language.

== Sources ==
- Cavendish, Margaret (1886). Firth, Charles Harding (ed.). The Life of William Cavendish, Duke of Newcastle, to which is Added the True Relation of My Birth, Breeding and Life. JC Nimmo.
- Donagan, Barbara (2004). "Lucas, Sir Charles (1612/13–1648)". Oxford Dictionary of National Biography (online ed.). Oxford University Press. doi:10.1093/ref:odnb/17123. (Subscription, Wikipedia Library access or UK public library membership required.)
- Gentles, Ian (1992). The New Model Army in England, Ireland and Scotland, 1645-1653. Blackwell. ISBN 978-0631158691.
- This article incorporates text from a publication now in the public domain: Firth, Charles Harding (1893). "Lucas, Charles (d.1648)". In Lee, Sidney (ed.). Dictionary of National Biography. Vol. 34. London: Smith, Elder & Co. pp. 229–231. contains a bibliography of:
  - Lloyd's Memoirs of Excellent Personages, 1668, contains a Lives of the Lucases
  - Heath's New Book of Loyal English Martyrs contains a Lives of the Lucases
  - Thomas Philip, Earl de Grey, A Memoir of the Life of Sir Charles Lucas, 4to, was privately printed in 1845.
  - The Life of William Cavendish, Duke of Newcastle, Firth (ed). 1886, App. pp. 363–369; contains an account of Lucas
  - Morant's History of Colchester, 1789, has an account of the family of Lucas, with a pedigree
  - Morant's History of Essex, 1758, has an account of the family of Lucas, with a pedigree
  - Warburton's Prince Rupert in the Fairfax Papers, contains the Letters of Sir Charles Lucas
  - Hist. MSS. Comm. 9th Rep. pt. ii., contains the Letters of Sir Charles Lucas
