= Castle Park, Colchester =

Public park in Essex, England

Castle Park
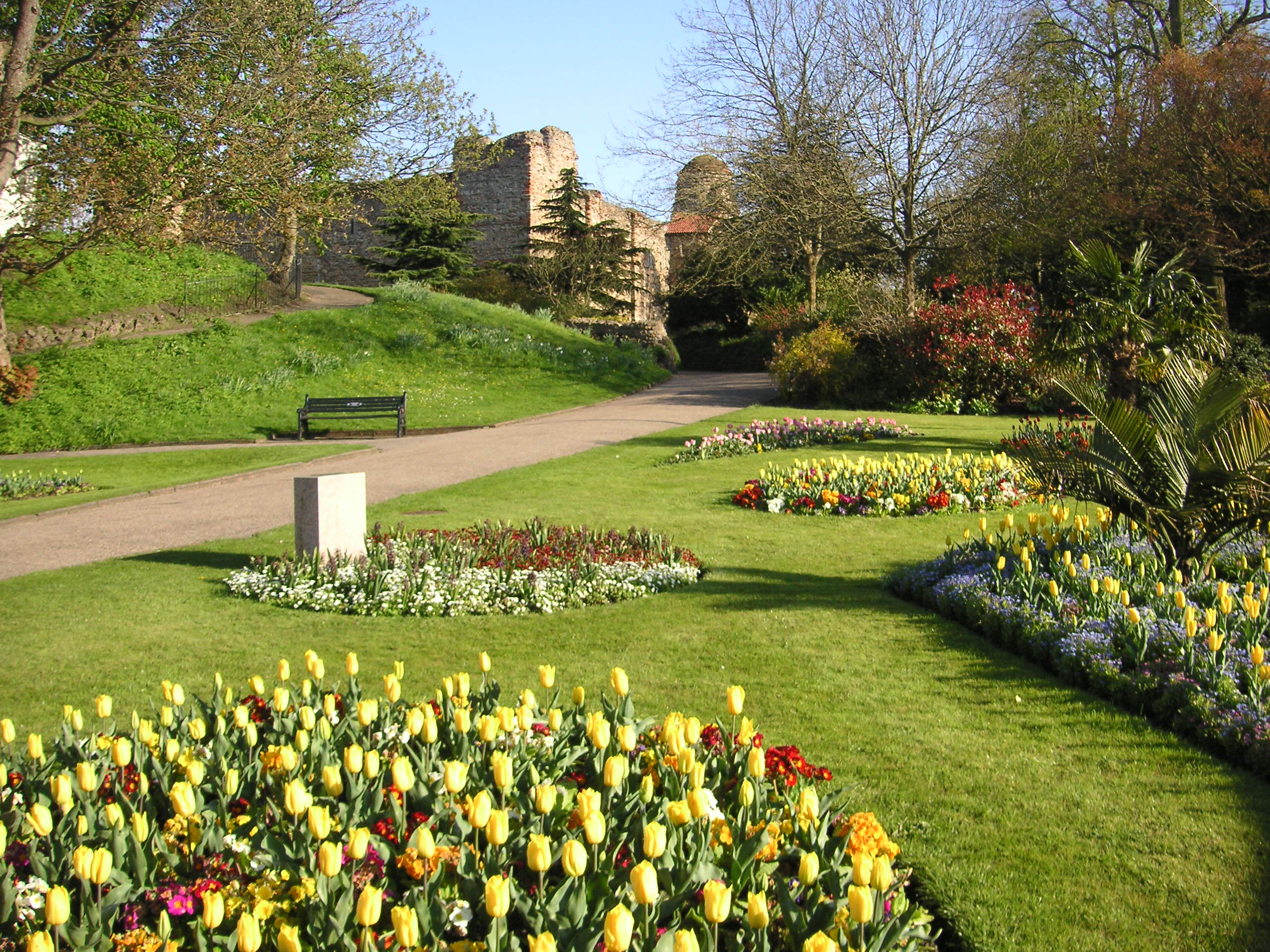
- Interactive map of Castle Park
- Type: Public park
- Location: Colchester, Essex
- Coordinates: 51°53′28.79″N 0°54′7.81″E
- Area: 25 ha (62 acres)
- Created: 1892
- Owner: Colchester City Council

Castle Park is a park in Colchester, Essex, England. It takes its name from Colchester Castle, which sits in the upper section of the park. It also incorporates Hollytrees, an 18th century house that now houses a museum. The park has been Grade II listed since 1987.

== History ==
Castle Park first opened by the Lord Mayor of London as a public park in 1892.

Colchester Castle and the surrounding gardens were purchased by the Borough of Colchester between 1920 and 1922, funded primarily by a donation from Weetman Pearson, and subsequently added to an enlarged Castle Park in 1929.

In 2005, a community group called Friends of Castle Park was created to represent the community's interests in the running of the park.

== Description ==
The park is divided into two sections, Upper Castle Park and Lower Castle Park, by Colchester's Roman wall, which runs through the middle of the park.

=== Upper Castle Park ===
Upper Castle Park stretches from the main entrance on Cowdray Crescent, following the hill down until it meets the Roman wall. Directly outside the main entrance is Colchester War Memorial, while just inside the entrance is Colchester Castle, a Norman-era keep built on the foundations of a Roman temple; today it is in use as a museum. Behind the castle is a memorial to Sir Charles Lucas and Sir George Lisle, who were executed there following the 1648 Siege of Colchester. Three surrounding gardens are named for Colchester's three twinned cities: Wetzlar, Avignon, and Imola, the last containing a koi pond.

Hollytrees Museum is also located within Castle Park. Built as a three-story mansion in the early 18th century, and expanded with a west wing in 1748, it is now a Grade I listed building and a museum.

Moving further into the park, there is a cast-iron bandstand opened in 1892, a Victorian gardener's hut, and a Neo-Georgian Classical café opened in the 1930s. The bandstand is itself Grade II listed; the balustrade was removed for scrap iron during the Second World War, and later replaced to the original designs in 2002–2003. It hosts an annual free-to-attend concert season, showcasing local music acts.

There is a children's play park in Upper Castle Park. It was most recently refurbished in 2025–26, reopening in April 2026. It was shortlisted for the LARIA Research Impact Awards 2026.

Views from Upper Castle Park
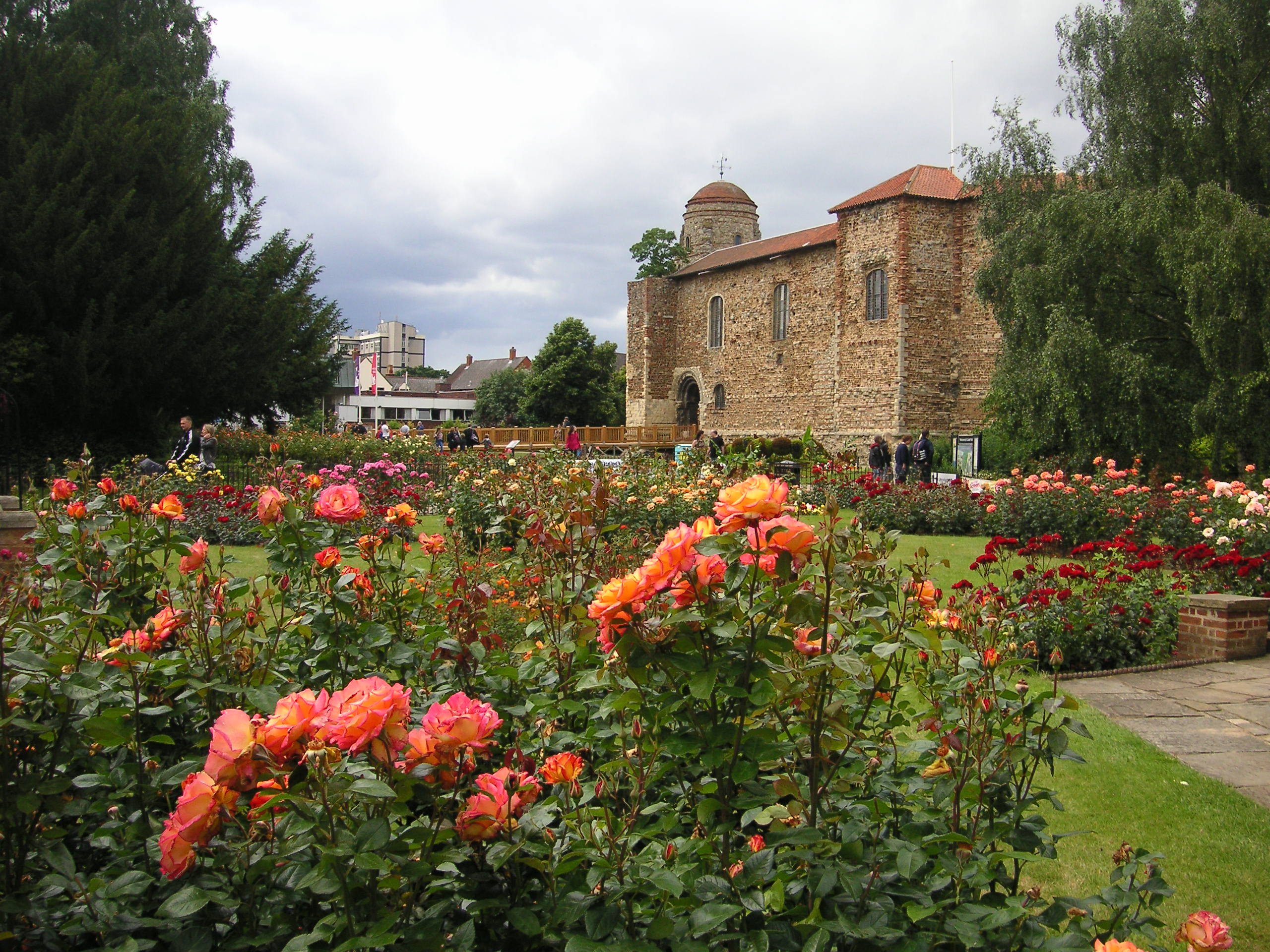
Colchester Castle

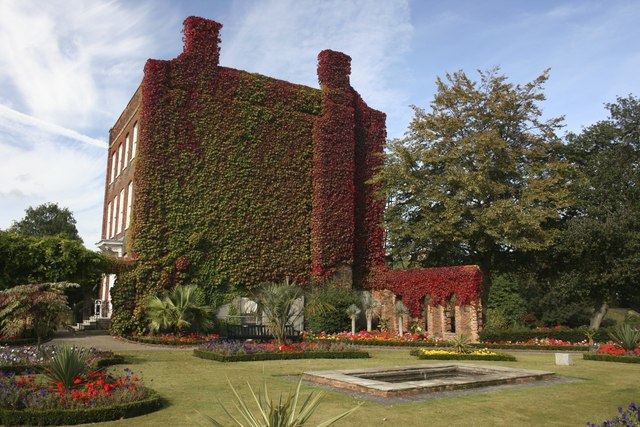
Hollytrees Museum

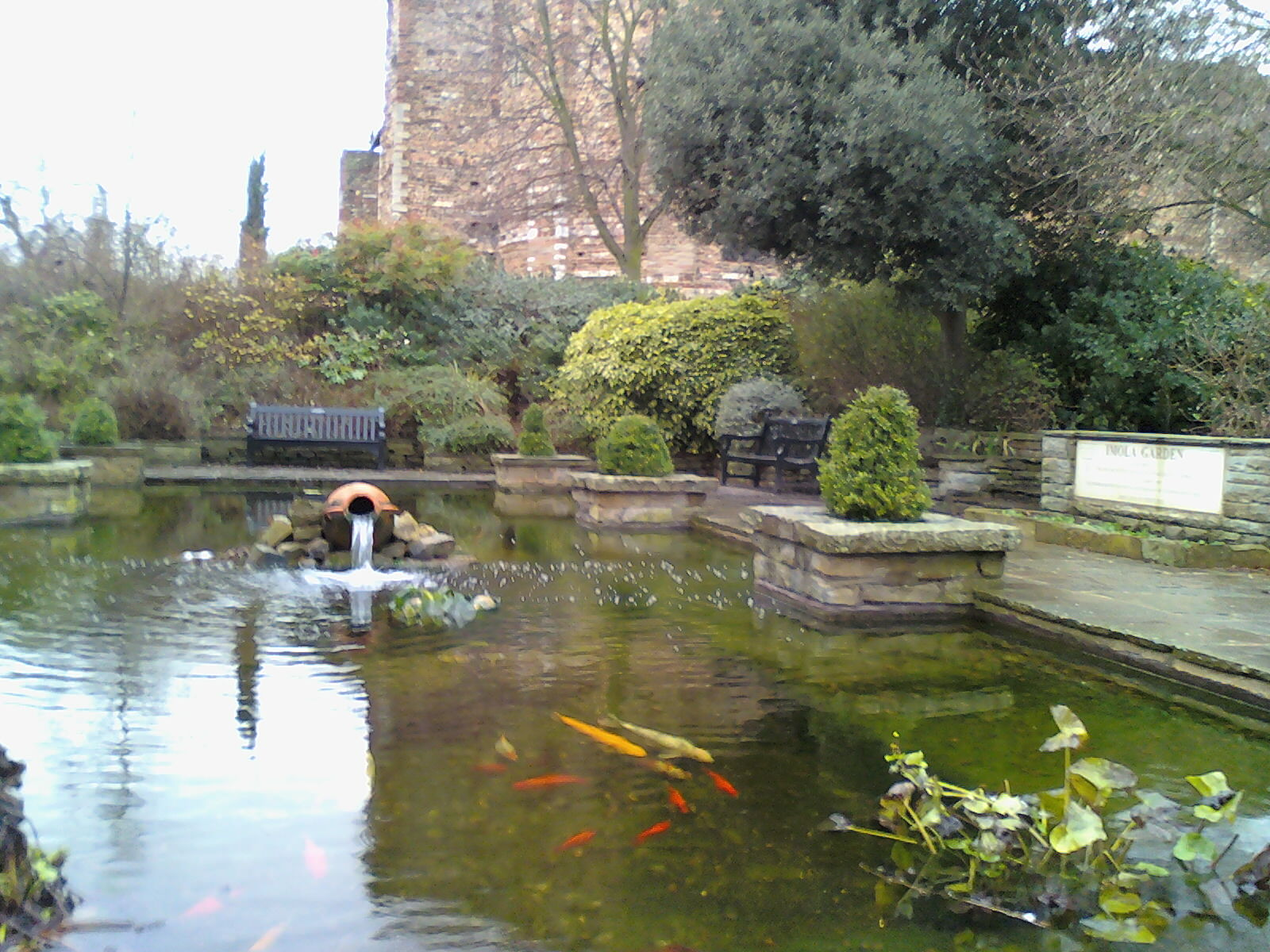
The 'Imola garden'

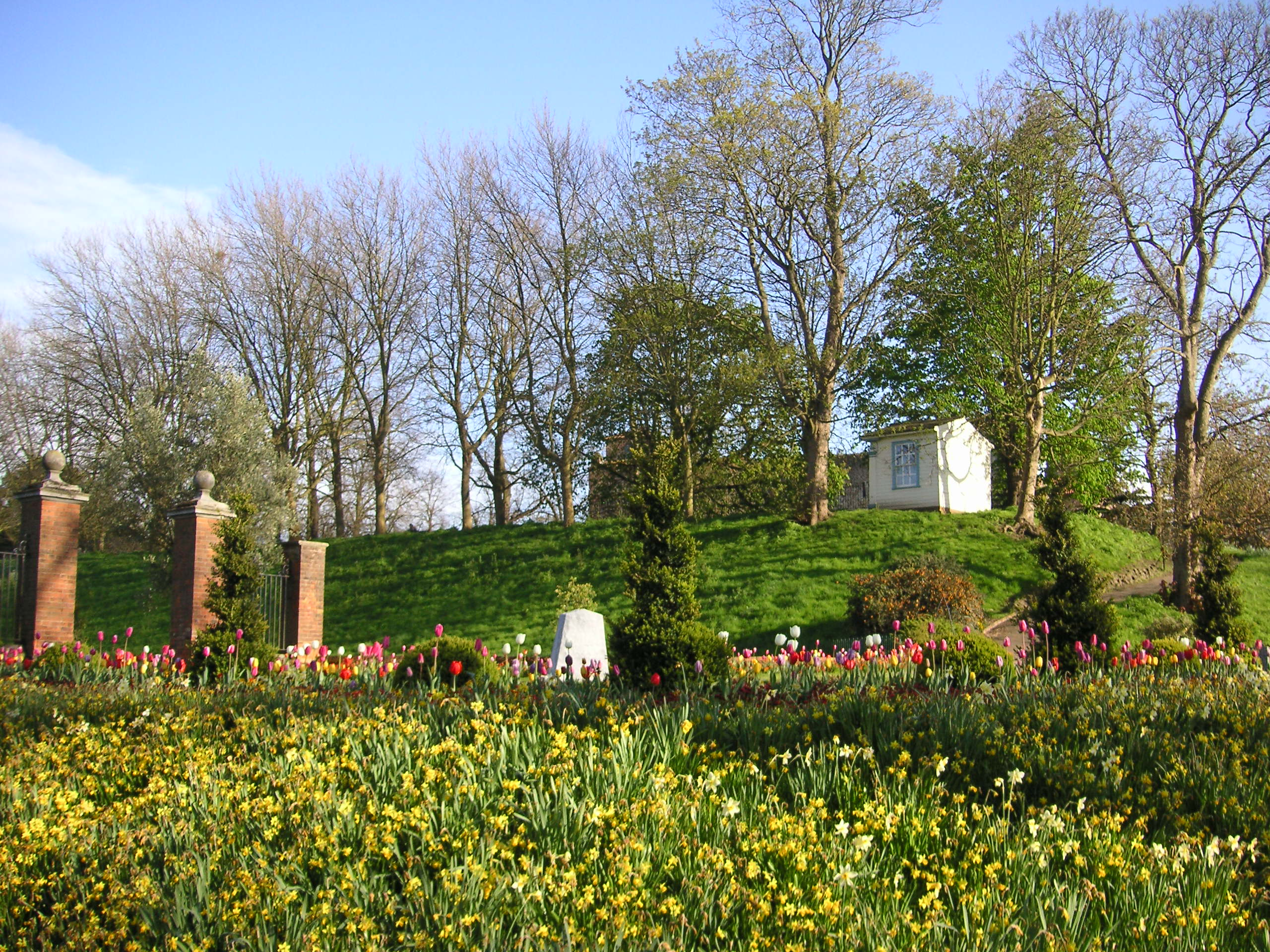
A view from behind the castle

=== Lower Castle Park ===
Lower Castle Park sits to the north of the Roman wall, and is formally bounded by the River Colne, though open areas continue beyond the river, and consists primarily of open grass areas.

Lower Castle Park contains a small boating lake, dating back to 1892. The lake has been empty since May 2024, after the water feed from nearby Middle Mill weir was cut off by a structural collapse. Repairs to the weir were ruled out in March 2025, after the cost was estimated at over £2 million, however repairs to other damaged structures, such as a nearby bridge in the park, has occurred.

Lower Castle Park has been used to host open air concerts following the commencement of a summertime music festival in 2025. Performers have included Olly Murs, Craig David, and Tom Jones.

Views from Lower Castle Park
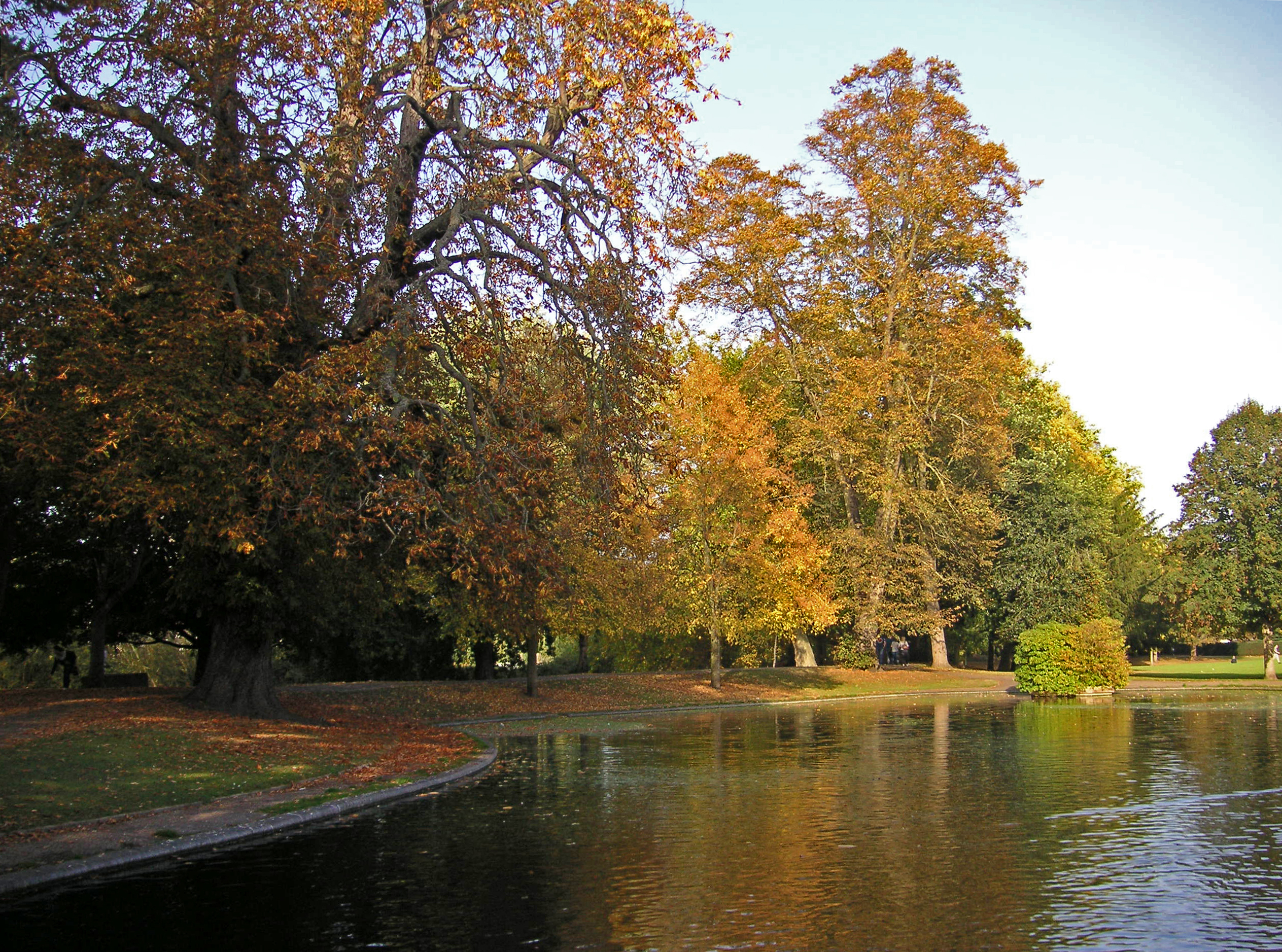
The boating lake

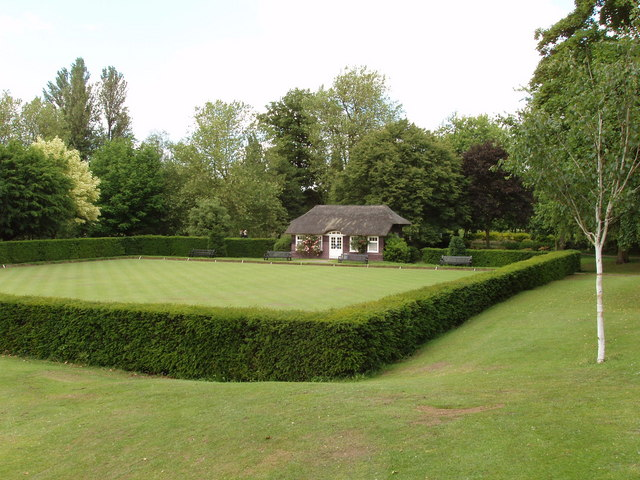
The bowling green

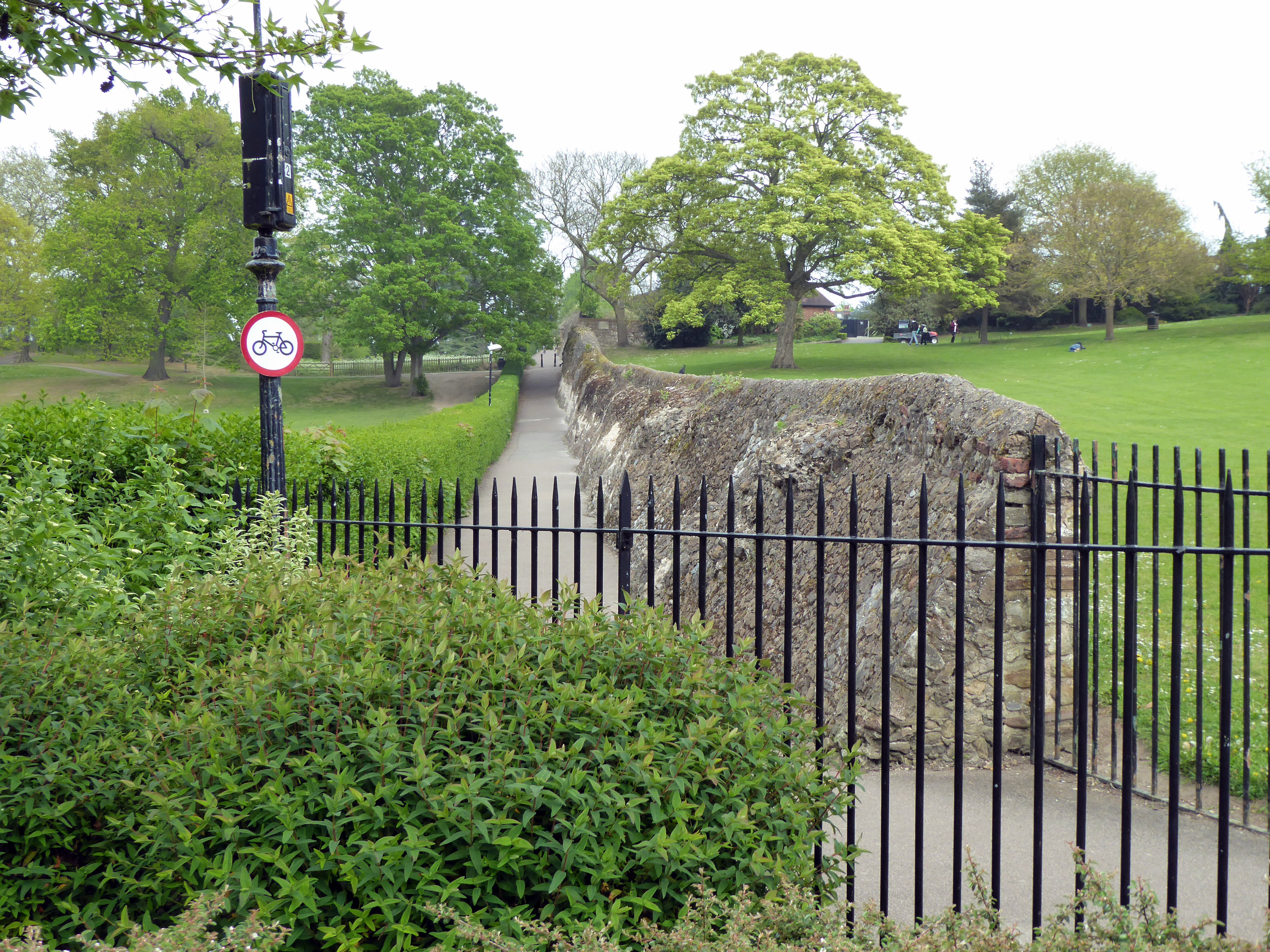
The Roman town walls

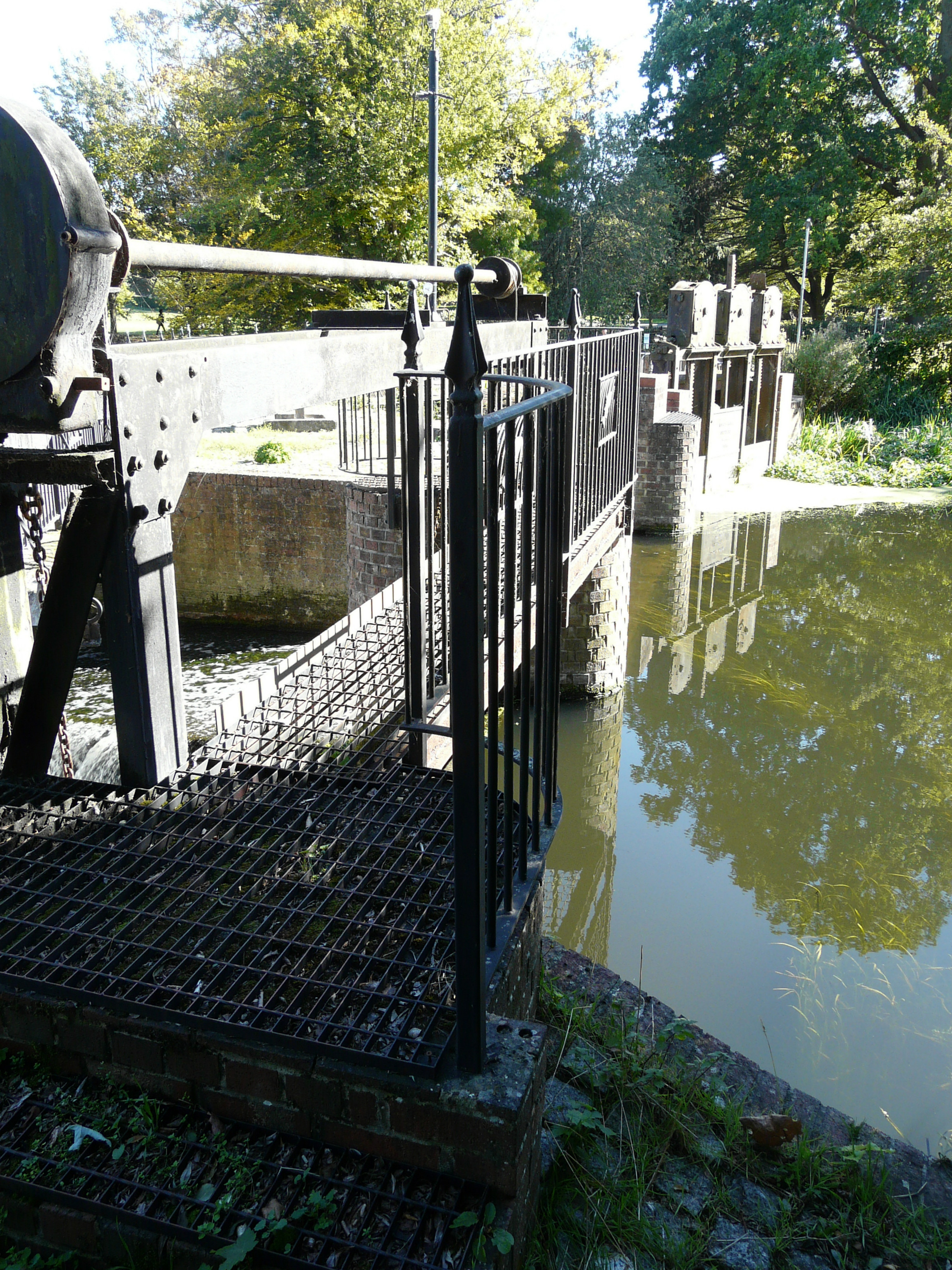
Middle Mill Weir, at the edge of the park
