= Pye baronets =

Extinct baronetcy in the Baronetage of England

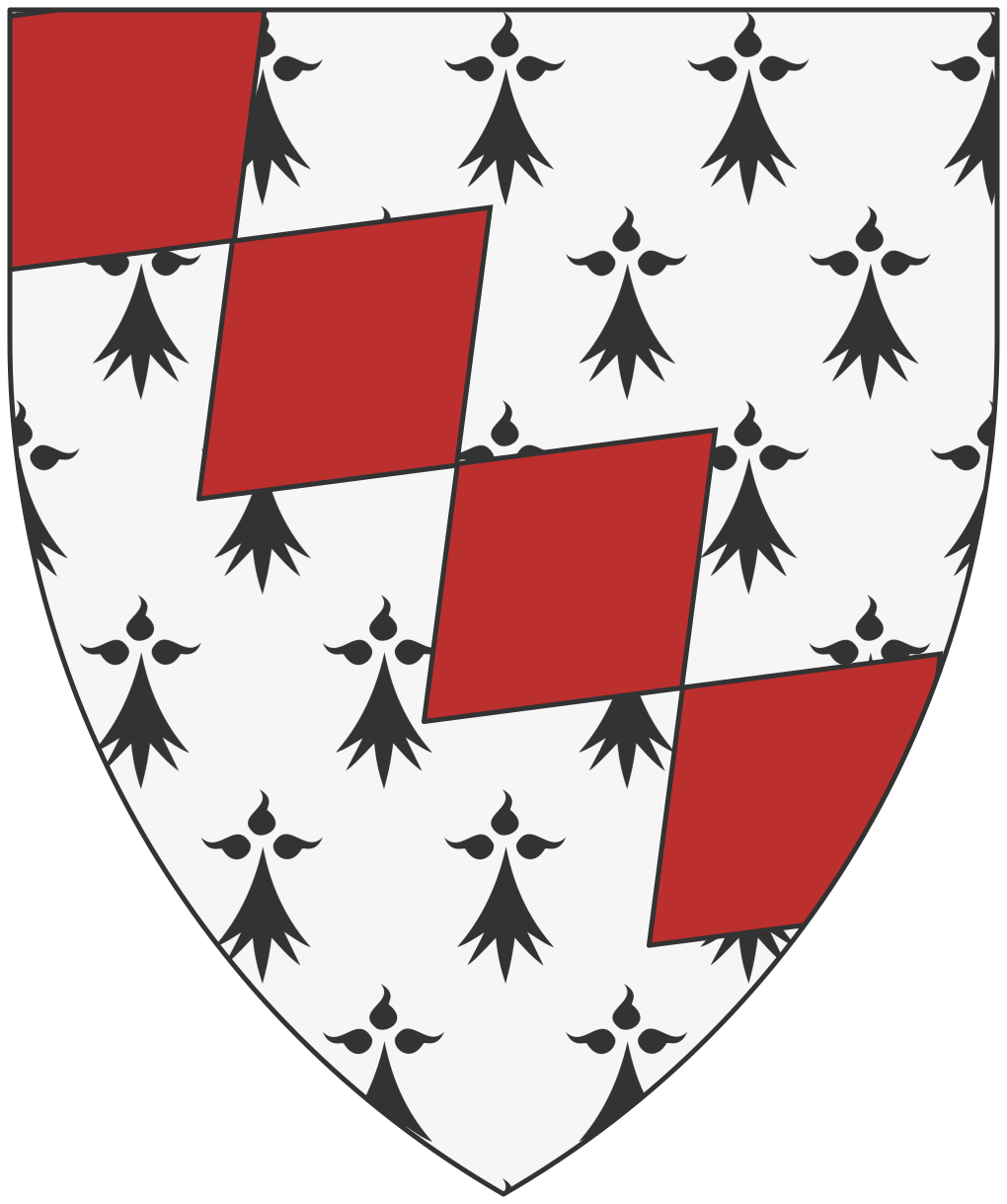
Arms of Pye of Leckhampstead and of Pye of Hone

There have been two baronetcies created for the Pye family. Both are now extinct.

The Baronetcy Pye of Leckhampstead was created on 27 April 1641 in the Baronetage of England, for Edmund Pye, who had purchased the Manor of Leckhampstead, Buckinghamshire in 1628. He was Member of Parliament for Wycombe in 1661. The baronetcy became extinct on his death in 1673. His daughter Martha married the John Lovelace, 3rd Baron Lovelace and their daughter Martha Johnson succeeded her paternal grandmother as 8th Baroness Wentworth.

The Baronetcy of Pye of Hone was created in the Baronetage of England on 13 January 1665 for John Pye of Hone, Derbyshire second son of Sir Robert Pye of Faringdon, Berkshire (1558–1662), Auditor of the Exchequer to James I and Charles I. His son, the second Baronet, acquired an estate at Clifton Hall, Clifton Campville, Staffordshire in 1700 and served as Member of Parliament for Derby in 1701. The third Baronet was also Member of Parliament for Derby in 1710. He died unmarried. When his brother, successor as fourth Baronet, also died unmarried in 1734 the baronetcy became extinct.

The Clifton estate was entailed and passed through the female line to Severne and Watkins. When Charles Watkins, Rector of Clifton, died in 1833, the estate reverted to the Pyes of Faringdon, and was inherited by Harry James Pye (1802–1884) (High Sheriff of Staffordshire in 1840), the son of Henry James Pye, Poet Laureate (1790–1813).

== Pye of Leckhampstead (1641) ==
- Sir Edmund Pye, 1st Baronet (1607–1673)

== Pye of Hone (1665) ==
- Sir John Pye, 1st Baronet (1626–1697)
- Sir Charles Pye, 2nd Baronet (1651–1721)
- Sir Richard Pye, 3rd Baronet (1689–1724)
- Sir Robert Pye, 4th Baronet (1696–1734)
