= George Lisle (Royalist) =

Sir George Lisle
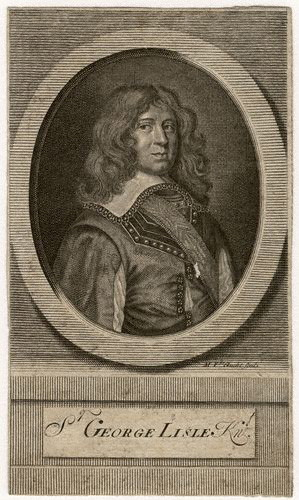
- Sir George Lisle, late 1630s; 1713 engraving based on now lost portrait

Master of the Household
- In office 1645–1648

Military Governor of Faringdon
- In office December 1645 – June 1646

Personal details
- Born: London
- Died: 28 August 1648 Colchester
- Cause of death: Executed by firing squad
- Resting place: St Giles Church Colchester
- Relations: Francis Lisle (1617-1644)
- Parent(s): Lawrence (ca 1585-after 1660); Dorothy (before 1600-1650?)

Military service
- Allegiance: Royalist
- Rank: Colonel
- Battles/wars: Eighty Years War; Siege of Breda (1637); Thirty Years War; Battle of Vlotho; Wars of the Three Kingdoms; Edgehill; Chalgrove; First Newbury; Cheriton; Cropredy Bridge; Lostwithiel; Second Newbury; Storming of Leicester; Naseby; Siege of Faringdon; Colchester

Sir George Lisle (baptised 10 July 1615 – 28 August 1648) was a professional soldier from London who briefly served in the later stages of the Eighty and Thirty Years War, then fought for the Royalists during the Wars of the Three Kingdoms. Captured at Colchester in August 1648, he was condemned to death by a Parliamentarian court martial and executed by firing squad along with his colleague Charles Lucas.

Son of a successful publisher with connections to the powerful Villiers family, Lisle began his military career in Europe before returning to England. Quickly proving a brave and competent leader, he was promoted to command of a brigade in the Royalist field army until it was destroyed at Naseby in June 1645. He surrendered at Oxford in June 1646 and made terms with Parliament.

When the Second English Civil War began in 1648, he joined the Royalist uprising in Kent before retreating to Colchester. After capitulating in August, he and Lucas were executed and later enshrined as Royalist martyrs.

== Personal details ==
George Lisle was baptised in London on 10 July 1615, second of four children born to Lawrence Lisle or Lyle, (ca 1585-after 1660), and his second wife Dorothy (before 1600-ca 1648-1660), a member of the Ashby family from Leicestershire. Contrary to what was sometimes assumed by 19th century biographers, he was not related to the Earl of Leicester, who used Viscount Lisle as a subsidiary title.

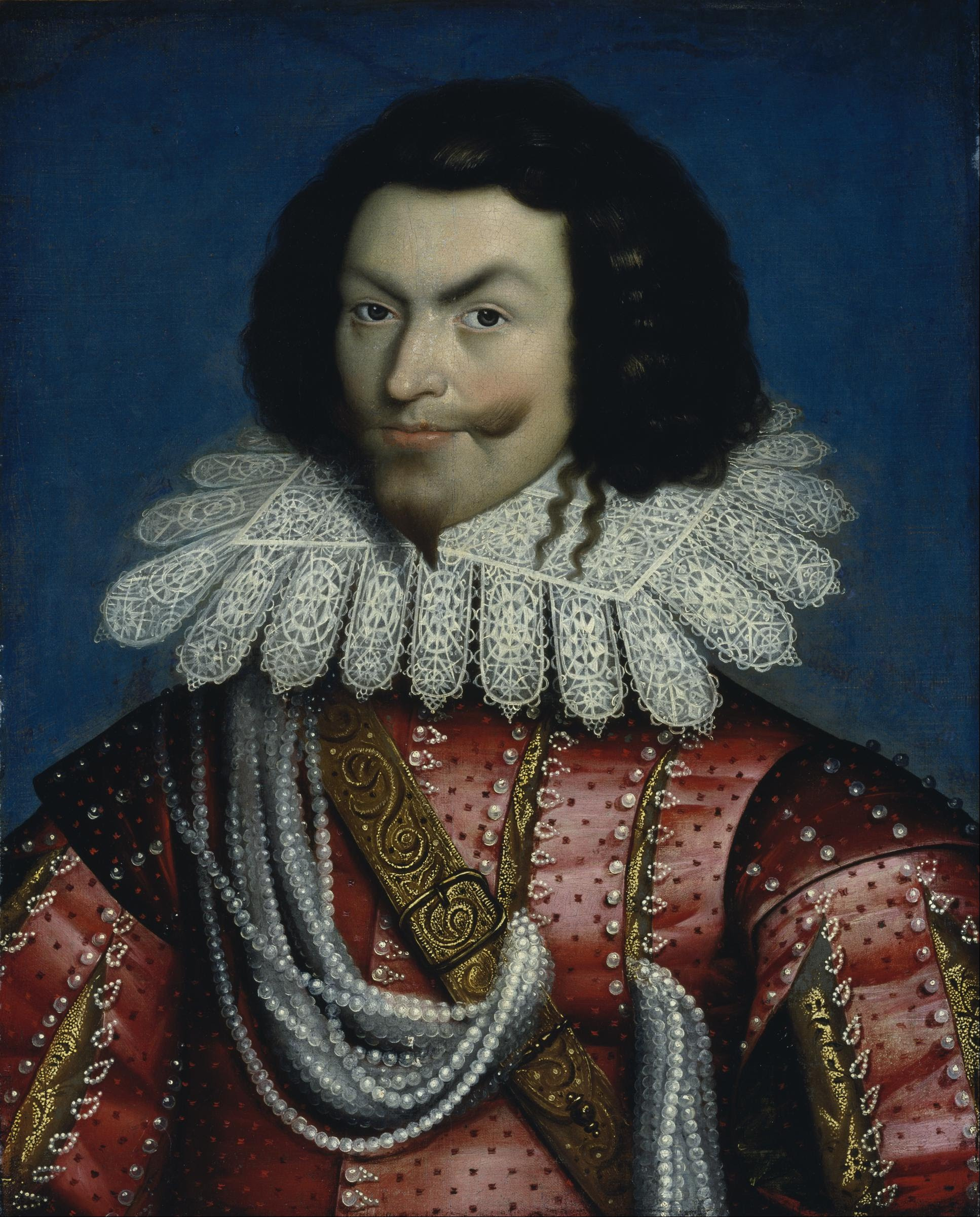
George Villiers, 1st Duke of Buckingham (1592-1628), the Lisle family patron

Previously better known as a bookseller, in 1613 Lawrence published poems by the courtier Thomas Overbury, whose death while being held in the Tower of London sparked a famous murder trial. They proved enormously popular and in 1616 Lawrence followed this with a "portraiture" of George Villiers, 1st Duke of Buckingham, newly installed favourite of James VI and I and later his son Charles I.

This connected the Lisles to the powerful and ambitious Villiers family, strengthened when Dorothy's distant relative Katherine Manners married Buckingham in 1620. Lawrence received a number of lucrative grants, including the right to collect customs duties on tobacco imports into Ireland and later claimed to have lost £12,000 supporting the Royalist cause. His acquisition of wealth and connections significantly increased the career prospects of his children, including George who may have been named after the Duke.

In addition to an elder half-sister Elizabeth (before 1614-after 1632), George had two siblings that reached adulthood; Francis (1617-1644), who was killed at Marston Moor, and Mary (?-died after 1673). Two others were baptised, William in 1614 and Anthony in 1624, but disappear from the records thereafter. He never married and does not appear to have left surviving children.

== Early career and First Civil War; 1636 to 1646 ==
Although professional officers generally came from the gentry rather than urban middle class, his Villiers connections allowed Lisle to overcome this barrier and he served with the Dutch States Army when they recaptured Breda in 1637. It is likely he did so as part of a force recruited in England by Lord Craven with the support of Charles I to help his nephew Charles I Louis, Elector Palatine retake the Electoral Palatinate. This ended with defeat at Vlotho in October 1638 and capture of the Elector's brother, Prince Rupert of the Rhine.

Lisle may be the man of the same name identified in London court records as the victim of an assault in May 1638 and although this does not exclude participation in the Vlotho campaign, it cannot be confirmed. Regardless, by 1639 he was serving as a captain under William Villiers, 2nd Viscount Grandison in the first of the two Bishops' Wars which began the Wars of the Three Kingdoms, then transferred in 1640 to a regiment commanded by Lord Goring, where Edward Villiers was a colleague. Following the outbreak of the Irish Rebellion of 1641, both George and his brother Francis received commissions in the army raised by Parliament to suppress it, but the First English Civil War began in August before their departure.

George Lisle's civil war; key locations, 1642 to 1648

Lisle spent the next three years with the Royalist field army based in Oxford, initially as Lieutenant-Colonel of dragoons under Arthur Aston. He took part in the October 1642 Battle of Edgehill and gained a reputation for courage and reliability, reportedly refusing to wear armour on occasion to reassure his men. In 1643, he fought at Chalgrove in May, was wounded at First Newbury in September and promoted colonel shortly after. He led an infantry regiment at Cheriton in March 1644 and during the campaign in the west commanded a brigade or tercio at Cropredy Bridge, Lostwithiel and Second Newbury.

On 29 May 1645, Lisle took part in the capture of Leicester, in which over 700 civilians and prisoners were massacred after surrendering. At Naseby on 14 June, the Oxford field army was destroyed along with most of Lisle's tercio, by then reduced from 2,800 in April 1644 to under 500. He escaped capture by being seriously wounded in the early stages and evacuated to Leicester; he completed his recovery at Lichfield and returned to Oxford in October.

With the Royalists reduced to a few isolated garrisons and facing imminent defeat, the high command split into opposing factions, with Charles handing out offices to secure the loyalty of key officers. The loss of his tercio and relatively low social status reduced Lisle's importance, but in December he was knighted, appointed Master of the Household and made governor of Faringdon. Such posts were now largely nominal; in late April, Charles made his way in disguise to the Covenanter army outside Newark-on-Trent, and Oxford and Faringdon surrendered on 25 June.

== Second Civil War and execution; 1646 to 1648 ==
In March 1646, Parliament announced Royalists who 'compounded' would be pardoned and have their property restored in return for an agreed fine and promise not to take up arms again. Lisle received a pass into London in January 1647, where he remained as Parliament struggled with economic distress, unpaid soldiers and the terms of a political settlement with Charles. When the Second English Civil War began in April 1648, he joined Royalists in Kent, led by the Earl of Norwich and Charles Lucas. After this rising was suppressed by the New Model Army, the remnants headed for Colchester, where Lucas assumed command. He refused several offers to surrender, since he faced death in any case for breaking his oath not to fight against Parliament; after an eleven-week siege, the town was close to starvation and capitulated on 28 August.

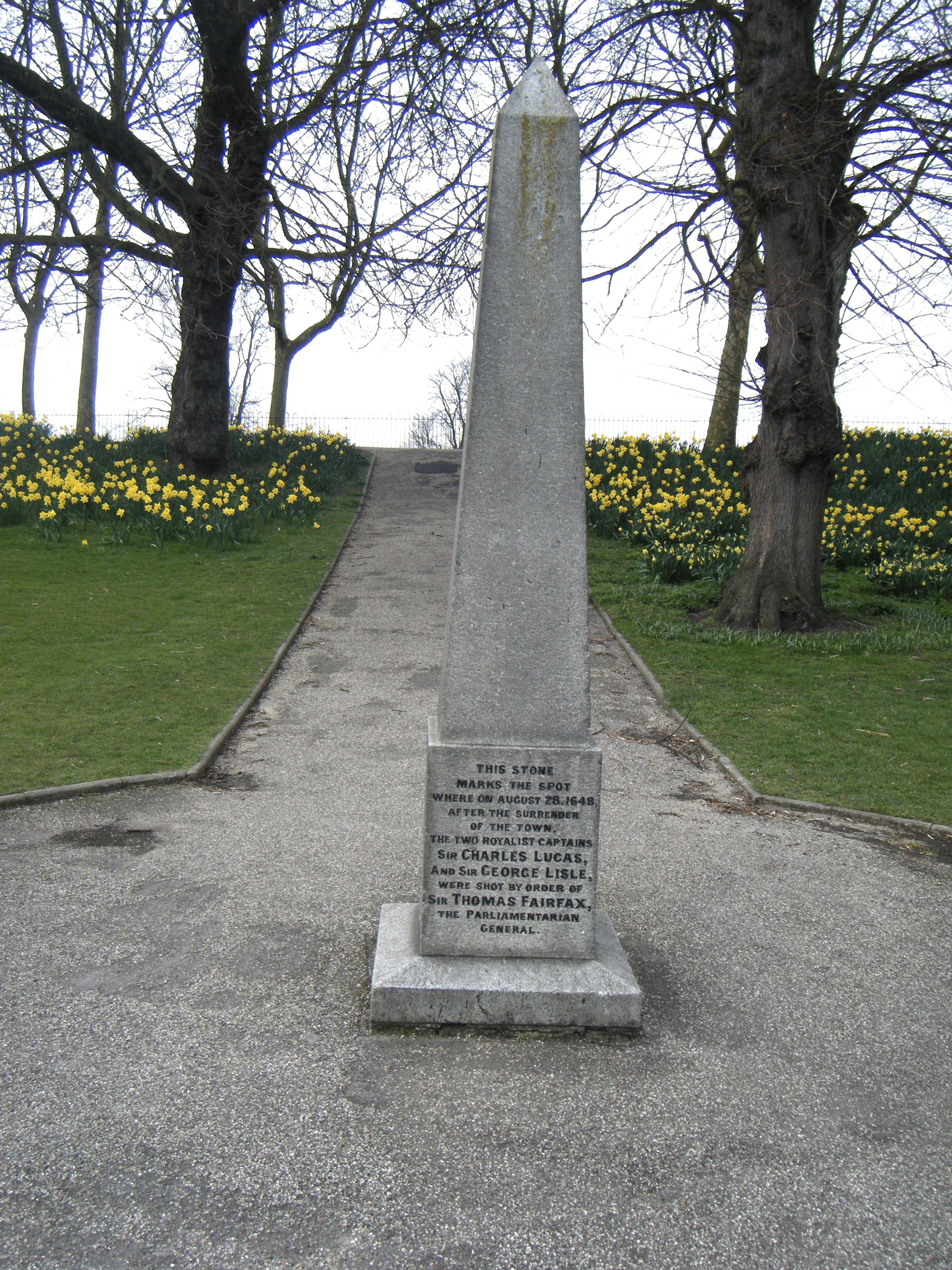
Monument to Lucas and Lisle at Colchester Castle

The latter stages of the first war were marked by atrocities on both sides, such as the Storming of Bolton and Liverpool by Prince Rupert's men in 1644, or the Parliamentarian "Ordinance of no quarter to the Irish" and killing of prisoners at Shelford Priory in November 1645. This bitterness continued into the second, especially against those like Lucas who had promised not to take up arms against Parliament again. Lisle himself was damaged by association with Prince Rupert, widely blamed for many atrocities, and his presence at Leicester, an event which shocked many in Parliament and formed one of the charges at the Trial of Charles I.

Other prisoners included Lords Norwich and Capell, who were sent to London for trial. Capell was beheaded in March 1649, while Lucas, Lisle and Sir Bernard Gascoigne were sentenced to immediate execution; Lucas died first, followed by Lisle, who reportedly invited the firing squad to come closer to ensure they did not miss. Gascoigne was reprieved and most of the garrison exiled.

Despite the legal justifications provided by Sir Thomas Fairfax, historian Trevor Royle views the executions as driven by frustration at having to resume the war, and anger at needlessly prolonging the siege long after it could impact the result of the war. Contrary to Royalist propaganda, Lisle and Lucas were not close friends but linked by their deaths and adoption as martyrs; after the Stuart Restoration in 1661, they were reburied in St Giles Church Colchester, where their memorial can still be seen.

In the amnesty and general act of forgetting that followed, Lisle and Lucas faded into obscurity until their case was resurrected during the 'Cavalier' resurgence of the Victorian era. A monument was erected to their memory behind Colchester Castle in Castle Park, and a number of scholarly papers published debating the legal merits of their execution.

== Sources ==
- Appleby, David (2020). "Fleshing out a massacre: the storming of Shelford House and social forgetting in Restoration England" (PDF). Historical Research. 93 (260): 286–308. doi:10.1093/hisres/htaa011.
- Jones, Serena (2021). No Armour But Courage: Colonel Sir George Lisle, 1615-1648. Helion Books. ISBN 978-1914059575.
- McIver, Bruce (1994). ""A Wife Now the Widdow": Lawrence Lisle and the Popularity of the Overburian Characters". South Atlantic Review. 59 (1): 27–44. doi:10.2307/3200944. JSTOR 3200944.
- Morgan, Basil (2004). "Lisle, Sir George (died 1648)". Oxford Dictionary of National Biography (online ed.). Oxford University Press. doi:10.1093/ref:odnb/16755. (Subscription, Wikipedia Library access or UK public library membership required.)
- Ford, David Nash. "Sir George Lisle (d. 1648)". Royal Berkshire History.
- Historic England. "Church of St Giles (1123520)". National Heritage List for England.
- Round, JH (1894). "The Case of Lucas and Lisle". Transactions of the Royal Historical Society. 8: 157–180. doi:10.2307/3678038. JSTOR 3678038. S2CID 177187336.
- Royle, Trevor (2004). Civil War: The Wars of the Three Kingdoms 1638–1660. Abacus. ISBN 978-0-349-11564-1.
- Smuts, R Malcolm (2004). "Craven, William, earl of Craven (1608-1687)". Oxford Dictionary of National Biography (online ed.). Oxford University Press. doi:10.1093/ref:odnb/6636. (Subscription, Wikipedia Library access or UK public library membership required.)
- Summers, Claude (2000). Literary Circles and Cultural Communities in Renaissance England Hardcover. University of Missouri Press. ISBN 978-0826213174.
- Vallance, Edward (2021). "Testimony, Tyranny and Treason: the Witnesses at Charles I's Trial". English Historical Review. 136 (581): 867–893. doi:10.1093/ehr/ceab272.
- Wedgwood, C.V. (1958). The King's War, 1641–1647 (1983 ed.). Penguin Classics. ISBN 978-0-14-006991-4.
- Young, Peter (1939). "King Charles I's army of 1643-1645". Journal of the Society for Army Historical Research. 18 (69): 27–37. JSTOR 44219782.
