= Ralph Creffeild =

Sir Ralph Creffeild (often incorrectly Creffield; Colchester, Essex, England, 1653 - Colchester, 22 June 1732) was an alderman and three times Mayor of Colchester. A significant landowner, he controlled extensive estates in and around the town. He came from a family of wealthy wool merchants, originally from Flanders, but at Chappel by 1348. His father, also Ralph, was himself mayor on four occasions.

Born in 1653, he ran the family business in the High Street of Colchester, but moved to Ardleigh, where he remained for fifty years. Creffeild was knighted by Queen Anne in 1713, having presented her with an address of thanks from the town's Corporation on the conclusion of the peace of Utrecht earlier that year.

In 1684 he married Rachel, daughter of George Tayspill; Rachel is now best remembered in Colchester for making a bequest to the poor of Trinity Parish. Though they had five children, only one survived to bear children: his second son, another Ralph Creffeild, born in 1687. Ralph predeceased his father, dying in 1723; consequently the estate jumped him and proceeded to his son Peter Creffield.

Creffeild himself died on 22 June 1732, aged 79. He was buried in St. Nicholas Church. His estate was described in the Ipswich Gazette for 5 July 1735, as "a very good house with coach-houses, stables, granaries, yards, gardens, rishponds and about 40 acres of arable land." In addition to his houses in Colchester and Ardleigh, he held East Mersea Hall, eleven messuages, three gardens, three cottages and over 1,200 acres (4.9 km^{2}) of land, incorporating Ardleigh, East Mersea, Elmstead, Frating, Great and Little Birch, Layer de la Haye, Layer Breton and Feering.
