= Stour Valley riots =

Local revolt in 17th Century England

The Stour Valley riots, also called the Anti-Popery riots, were a series of anti-Roman Catholic riots and attacks which took place across southern East Anglia throughout 1642. The unrest was concentrated in the area surrounding the River Stour, on the border of Essex and Suffolk.

The riots are believed to have been caused by several factors. By early 1642 East Anglia had high unemployment, due in large part to the rapid decline of the English cloth industry and wool trade. Former clothworkers are recorded as having been the principal actors in the unrest, and there was economic anxiety regarding the wealth of certain Catholic families. In addition, there was a widespread belief in England that a Papal plot to return the country to Roman Catholicism was going to be carried out imminently, and East Anglia was largely staunchly Puritan. The riots took place at the same time as royal authority was collapsing in eastern England preceding the English Civil War. The most notable targets of popular discontent were Sir John Lucas, a suspected Catholic, and the Countess Rivers, a well known recusant with major landholdings in Suffolk. The first major widely recorded incident took place in Colchester in August 1642, when a large crowd attacked the house of Sir John Lucas. From Colchester, attacks and protests quickly spread around the region, with Roman Catholics, their sympathisers and Royalists being the main targets. The Colchester crowds are recorded as having travelled within a 20 mile radius, sacking the homes of numerous clergymen and gentry, including those of Elizabeth Savage, Countess Rivers and Sir William Davenly. Churches with Laudian clergy or High Church decorations were also sacked or damaged. Walter records that crowds of several thousand people were involved in the riots.

While publicly condemning the attacks, the Parliamentary authorities used the unrest caused by the riots to assert their control over the region through loyal gentry families. The Parliamentarian Sir Nicholas Barnardiston coordinated the efforts to pacify the roaming crowds, and raised bodies of troops which would later serve Parliament in the Civil War. Parliament also used the opportunity to confiscate arms and weapons held by those known to be Royalists. Most notably, Sir William Spring, 1st Baronet was ordered to search Hengrave Hall, the house of his cousin, Lady Penelope Darcy, where it was thought arms for a Catholic insurrection were being stored. A crowd from Long Melford attacked Melford Hall and partially destroyed it, and destroyed the home of the village priest, Dr Robert Warren. There are few records of the riots from the Privy Council of England, demonstrating the lack of central royal authority over the region during 1642. The riots subsided during late Autumn 1642 as the civil war spread across the country.
