= John Lucas, 1st Baron Lucas of Shenfield =

English Royalist soldier, industrialist and landowner

Sir John Lucas 1st Baron Shenfield

High Sheriff of Essex
- In office 1636–1637

Personal details
- Born: 23 October 1606
- Died: 2 July 1671 (aged 64) St John's, Essex, England
- Spouse: Anne Nevill (1628-1660)
- Children: Mary (died 1700)

Military service
- Allegiance: Royalist
- Years of service: 1642-1645
- Rank: Colonel
- Battles/wars: First English Civil War; Naseby

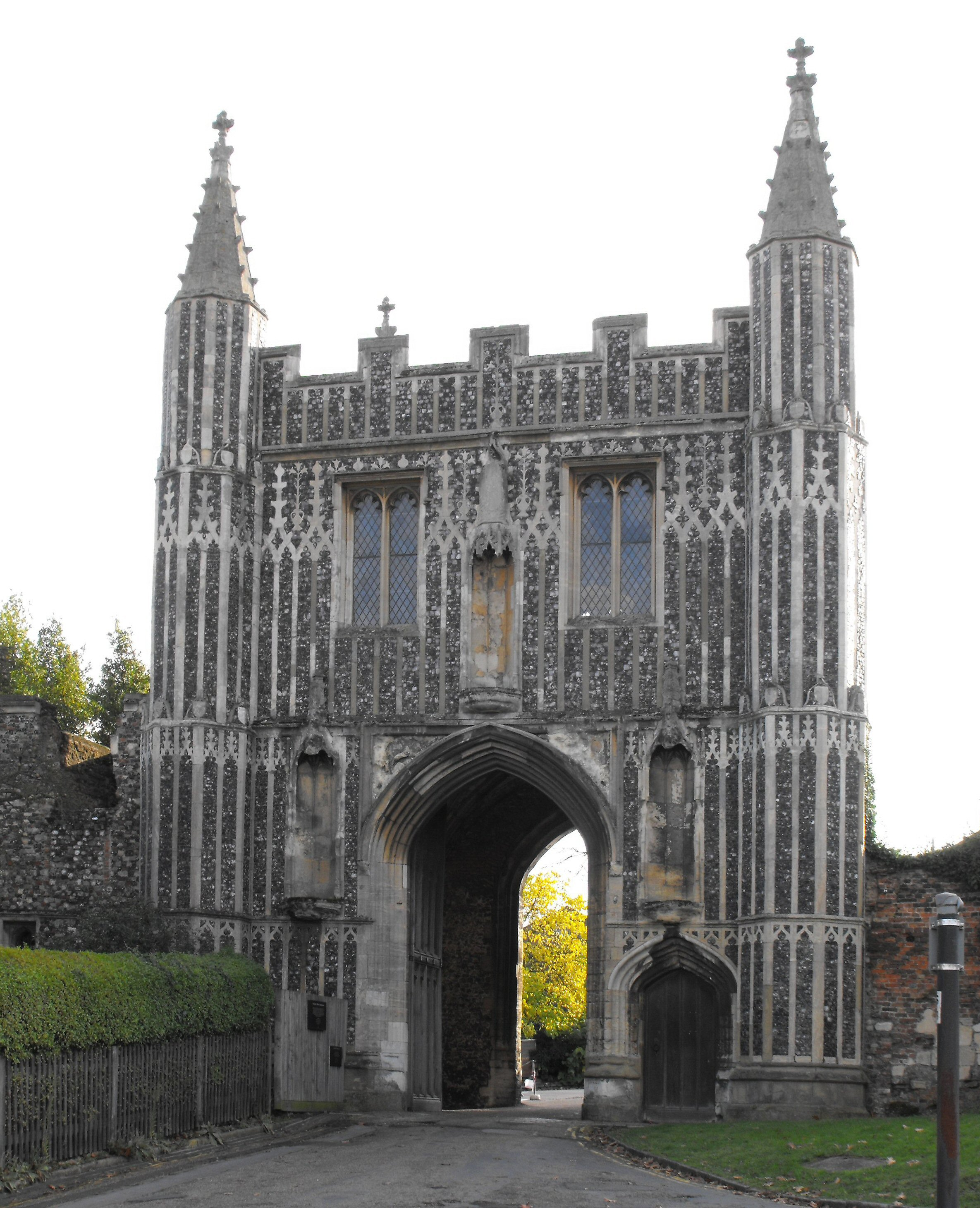
Gatehouse of St John's, the Lucas family home

John Lucas, 1st Baron Lucas of Shenfield (23 October 1606 – 2 July 1671) was an English Royalist soldier, industrialist and landowner.

Lucas was the son of Sir Thomas Lucas and Elizabeth Leighton. He was one of eight children which included other notable people such as Sir Thomas Lucas, Sir Charles Lucas (d.1648), both Royalist officers, and the philosopher Margaret Cavendish.

Lucas was an early public supporter of the Royalist cause and in 1638 he was appointed to the household of the eight year old Prince of Wales. His house in Colchester, St John's, was attacked by a crowd during the Stour Valley Riots of 1642 and he was imprisoned by Parliamentarian forces early in the First English Civil War, but escaped and fought for the king at the Battle of Naseby. On 3 January 1645 he was created Baron Lucas of Shenfield, of Shenfield in the Peerage of England. He was again imprisoned by Parliament in 1655, before being released prior to the Stuart Restoration in 1660. He was elected an Original Fellow of the Royal Society in 1663; he was possibly expelled in 1666.

He married Anne Nevill in 1628. Lucas had one surviving daughter, Mary Grey, Countess of Kent, who was created suo jure Baroness Lucas of Crudwell at her father's request. Lucas was buried at St Giles's church, Colchester. He died without surviving male issue and by a special remainder in his patent, the heir to his title was Charles Lucas, 2nd Baron Lucas (1631–1688), son of his elder brother Sir Thomas Lucas.

== Sources ==
- Radcliffe, Sir George, ed. (1739). The Earl of Strafforde's Letters and Dispatches, with an Essay Towards His Life, Volume 2. William Knowler.
- Walter, John (2004). "Lucas, John, first Baron Lucas of Shenfield (1606-1671)". Oxford Dictionary of National Biography (online ed.). Oxford University Press. doi:10.1093/ref:odnb/51215. (Subscription, Wikipedia Library access or UK public library membership required.)
- The Peerage: John Lucas, 1st Baron Lucas of Shenfield

Peerage of England
Preceded by New Creation	Baron Lucas; 1645–1671	Succeeded by Charles Lucas
