= Siege of Colchester =

Part of the Second English Civil War

- Part of Second English Civil War
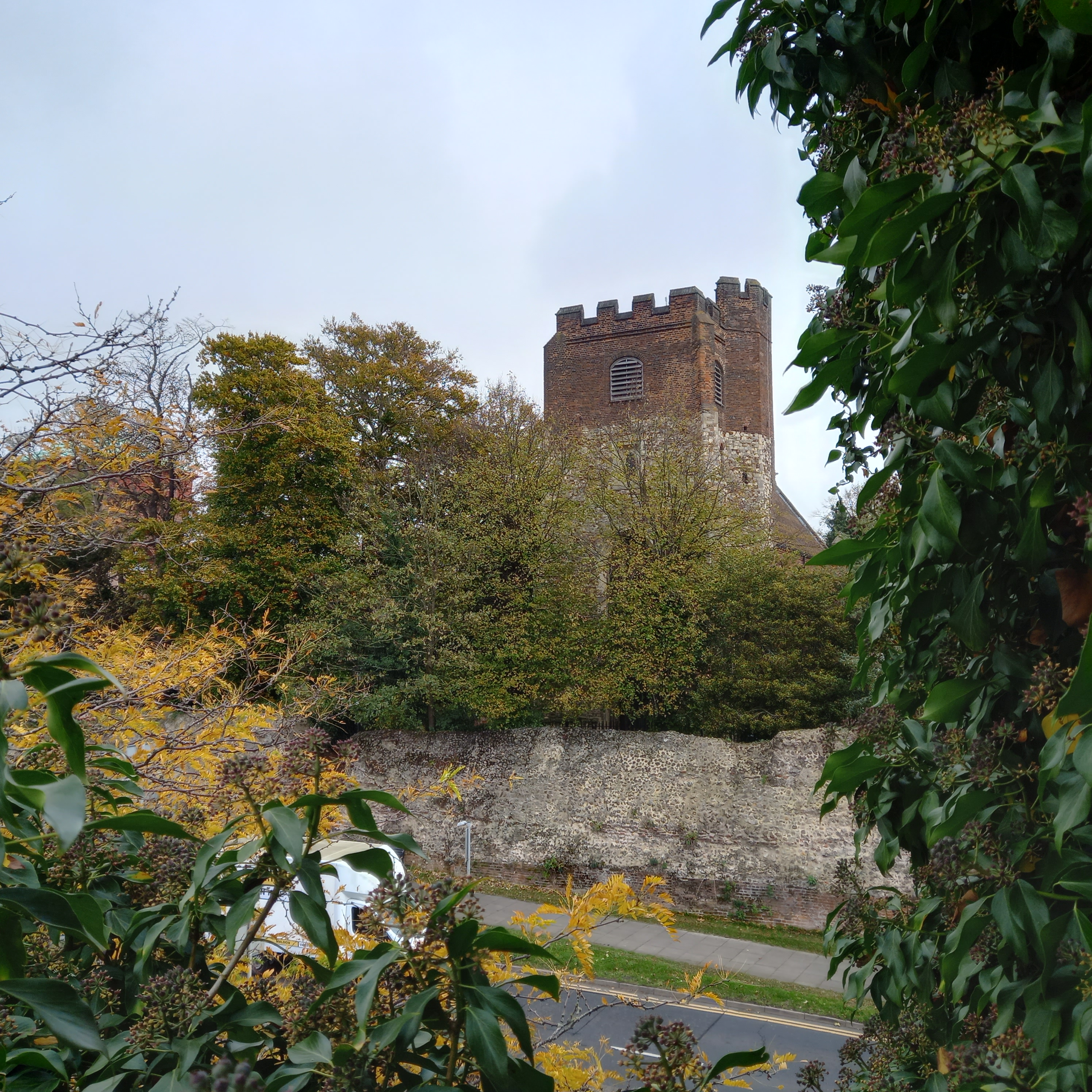
- St Mary-at-the-Walls church was used as a gun battery during the siege, the later brick repair to the tower is still evident.
Date	12 June – 28 August 1648
Location	Colchester, Essex 51.89°N 0.90°E
Result	Parliamentary victory

Belligerents
Royalists	Parliamentarians

Commanders and leaders
Earl of Norwich (surrendered); Lord Capel (executed); Sir Charles Lucas (executed); Sir George Lisle (executed)	Sir Thomas Fairfax

Strength
4,000	5,000 (plus reinforcements)

Casualties and losses
1,000	500–1,000
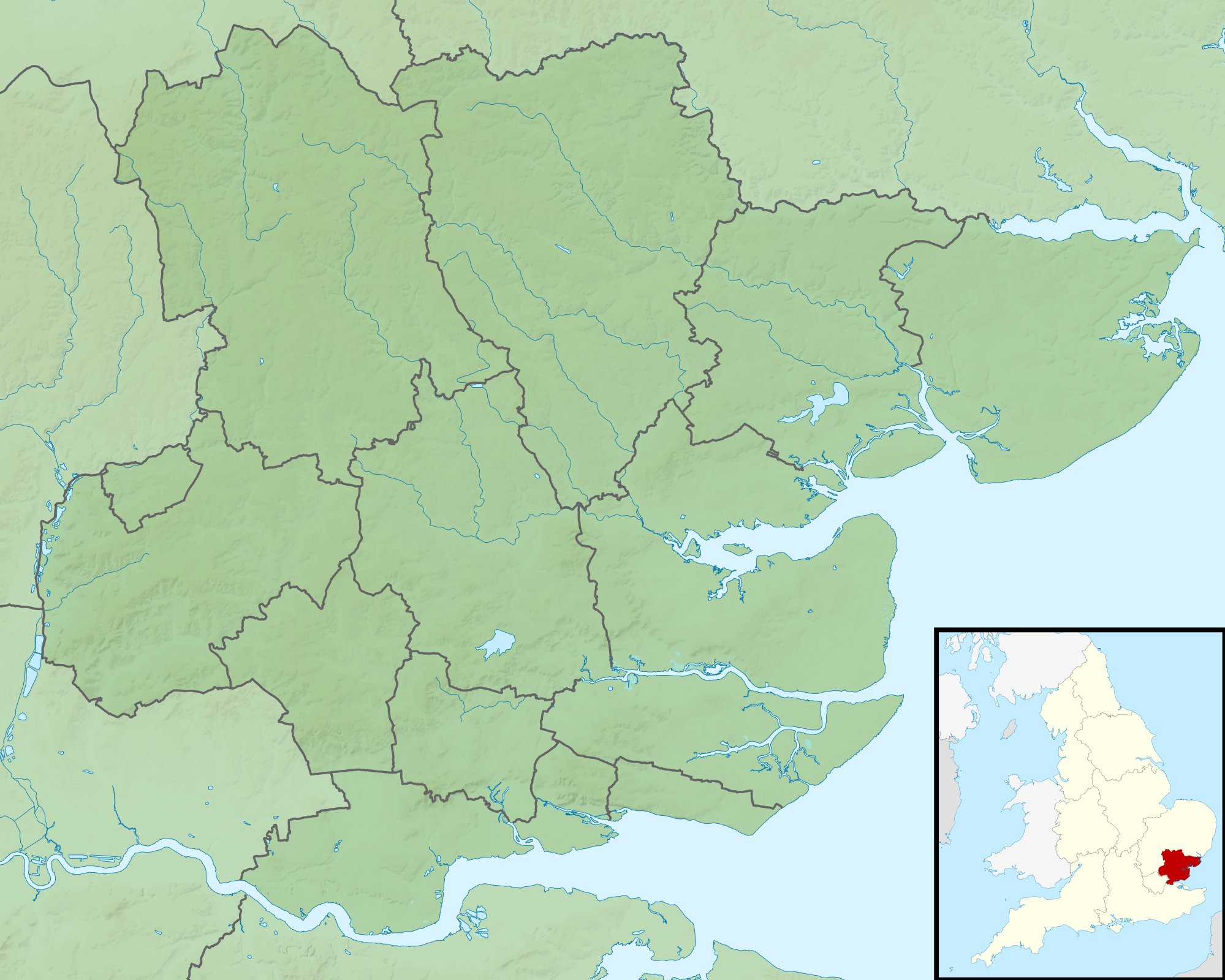
- Essex

The siege of Colchester occurred in the summer of 1648 when the Second English Civil War reignited in several areas of Britain. Colchester found itself in the thick of the unrest when a Royalist army on its way through East Anglia to raise support for the King, was attacked by Lord-General Thomas Fairfax at the head of a Parliamentary force. The Parliamentarians' initial attack forced the Royalist army to retreat behind the town's walls, but they were unable to bring about victory, so they settled down to a siege. Despite the horrors of the siege, the Royalists resisted for eleven weeks and only surrendered following the defeat of the Royalist army in Northern England at the Battle of Preston (1648).

== Background ==
On 21 May, the county of Kent rose in revolt against Parliament. Lord-General Fairfax led Parliamentary forces to Maidstone and on 1 June recaptured the town. Remnants of the Royalist forces commanded by the Earl of Norwich fled the county to rejoin the revolt in Essex.

On 5 June the Essex County Parliamentary committee in Chelmsford was taken prisoner by a riotous crowd. Colonel Henry Farre and some of the Essex Trained Bands declared themselves in support of the King. Charles Lucas took command of the Essex regiment and on 9 June he was joined by the Earl of Norwich, Lord Capel, Lord Loughborough, George Lisle and about 500 of the Royalist soldiers from Kent. The next day Lucas marched with what was now a total force of around 4,000 troops to Braintree where the county magazine was located. Meanwhile, however, Thomas Honywood, a member of the Essex county committee, had secured the weapons with the northern Essex Trained Bands, who had remained loyal to Parliament. Lucas continued to Colchester, arriving on 12 June, where he intended to raise more troops before continuing to Suffolk and then Norfolk, hopefully to raise those counties in support of the King.

Fairfax and his Parliamentary forces from Kent and the Essex forces under Thomas Honywood were joined outside Colchester by Colonel John Barkstead's Infantry Brigade from London on 13 June. In total, Fairfax now had more than 5,000 experienced troops and over one thousand cavalry. He decided to re-use the same tactics as he had recently employed against the Royalists in Maidstone by launching an immediate and full-scale assault.

== The battle ==
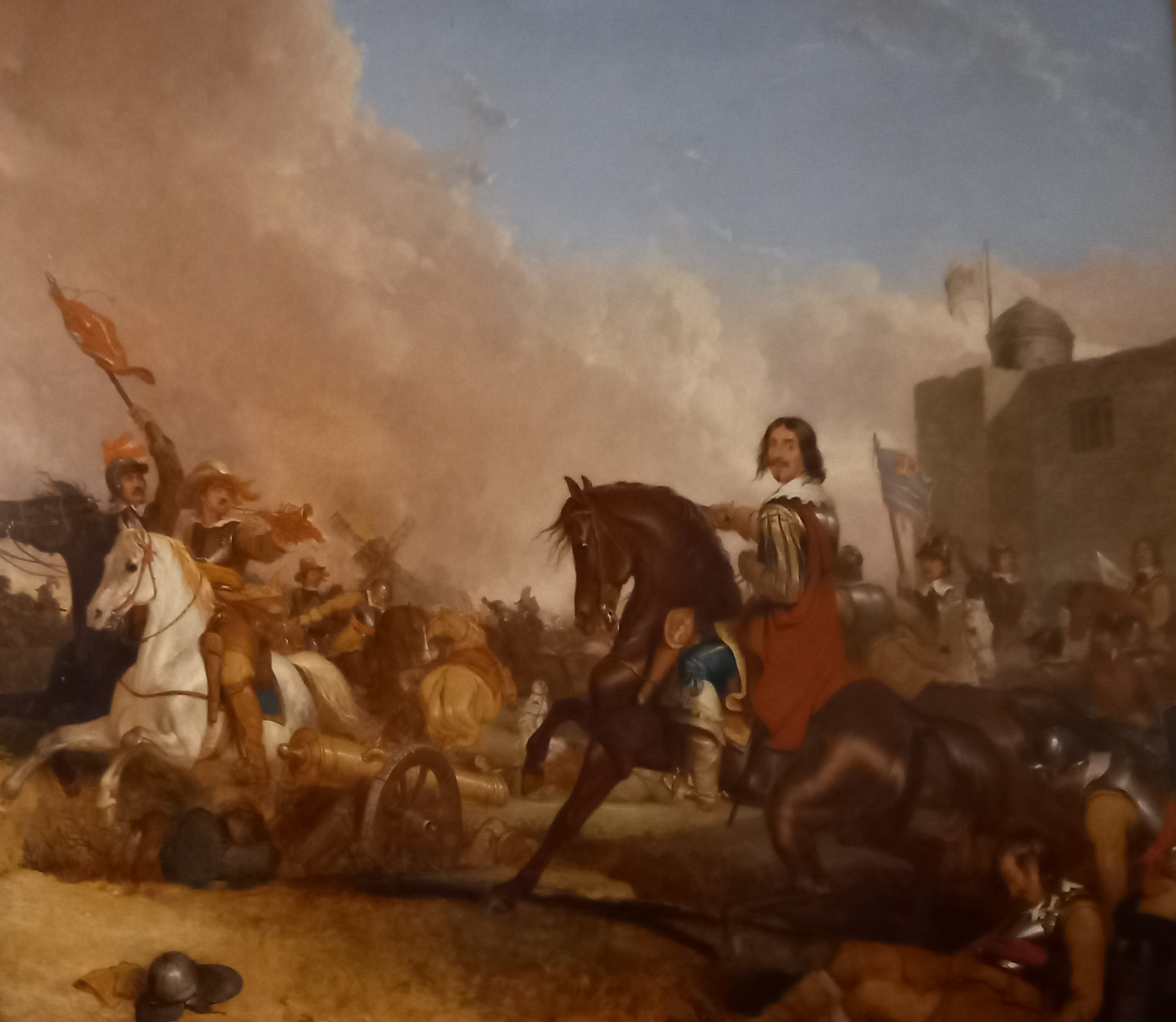
Lord Arthur Cappell fighting inside the walls of Colchester with Colchester Castle in the background. A later painting by Abraham Cooper (1787–1868).

The Royalists defended their position by placing troops on the outskirts of the town on Maldon Road, from where the Parliamentary army was approaching. The terrain outside of the town walls was thick with orchards and hedgerows, providing good cover for the defending forces. The battle was fiercely fought as Barkstead's infantry attacked and were repulsed three times.

After inflicting significant casualties upon the attackers, the Royalists withdrew behind the town's walls. Barkstead's pursuing men followed in through the gates, where they encountered an ambush; Lucas had positioned his artillery and musketeers to fire on the gate, and his cavalry to strike after the initial volley. The Parliamentarians were driven from the town, suffering around a hundred casualties.

Fairfax continued to attack and it was not until midnight that he finally called a halt and had to resign himself to the failure to take the town by storm. In the battle he had lost between 500 and 1,000 men while recorded Royalist losses were 30 men and two officers. This is almost certainly a gross underestimate of Royalist losses.

== The siege ==
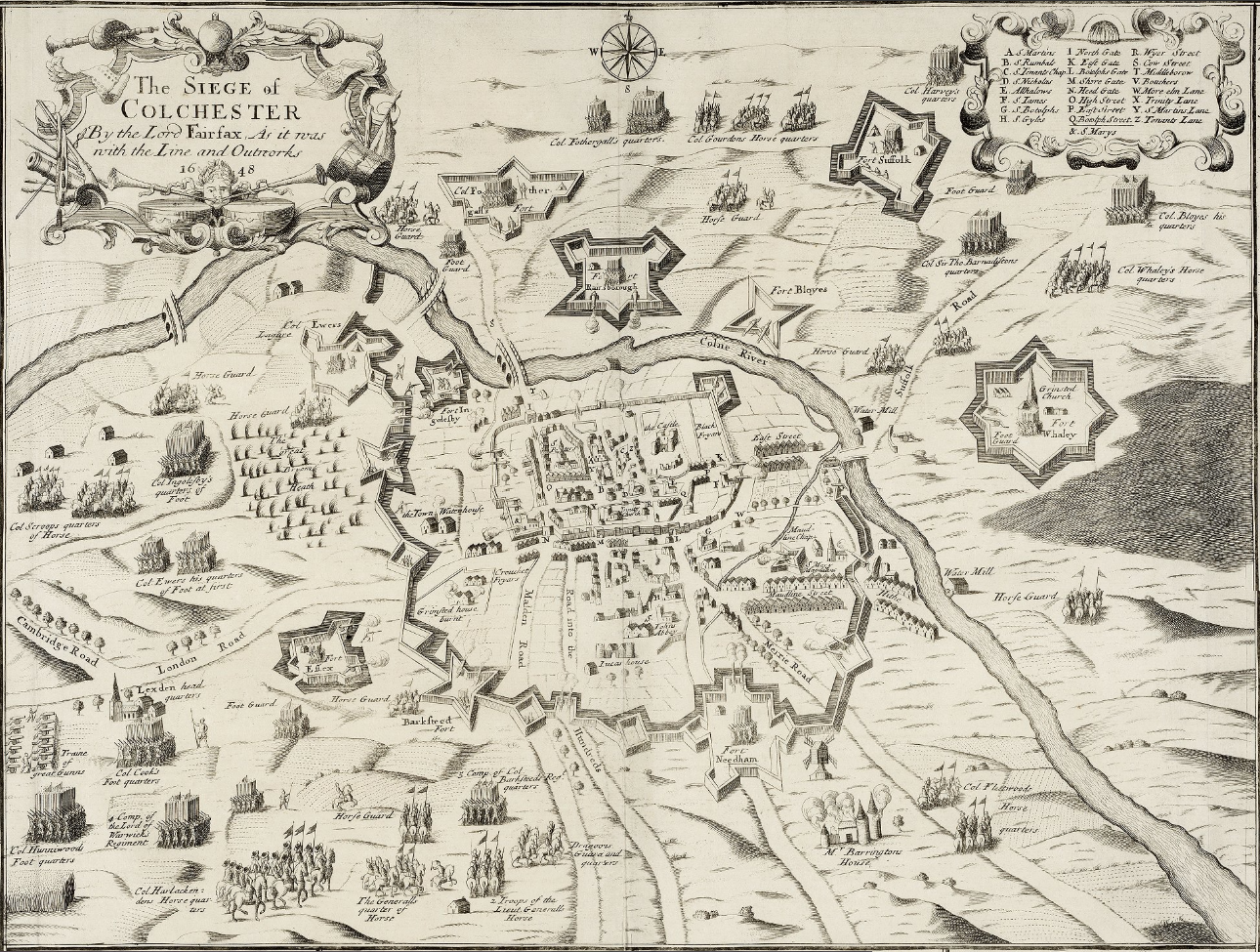
A map of the 1648 siege of Colchester published in a contemporary broadsheet entitled "A diary of the siege of Colchester by the forces under the command of Generall Fairfax"

As the siege started, both forces were about equal in men and both had an expectation of receiving reinforcements. Norwich was negotiating with the Suffolk men and knew that the Scots and Langdale's Northern Royalist army were fighting for the Royalist cause, and that Earl of Holland, the commander of the Royalist forces in the South of England, was attempting to muster a relief force. Fairfax could expect detachments of the New Model Army to be sent to him as and when they became available.

The first priority for Fairfax was to secure the town from outside relief as well as excursions by the trapped men. He began a programme of circumvallation, constructing ten forts around Colchester to secure his position against any Royalist relief forces; this was the first time that the New Model Army had used the technique. His thinly spread men were soon reinforced when six companies of horse and dragoons arrived and when the Suffolk Trained Bands, who Norwich had expected to join the Royalists, instead joined the Parliamentary side. The Suffolk men were actually more concerned about preventing either side from spreading destruction into their county and in recognition of this Fairfax gave them the task of guarding the bridges across the River Colne to the north and east. Parliamentarian ships were ordered to blockade the harbour and the river mouth to prevent any re-supply via that route.

Inside the town, the local people found themselves trapped with an army with which most had very little sympathy. Colchester had been a staunch supporter of Parliament during the First English Civil War and any sympathy with the Royalist army soon vanished as the soldiers seized provisions from the town's people.

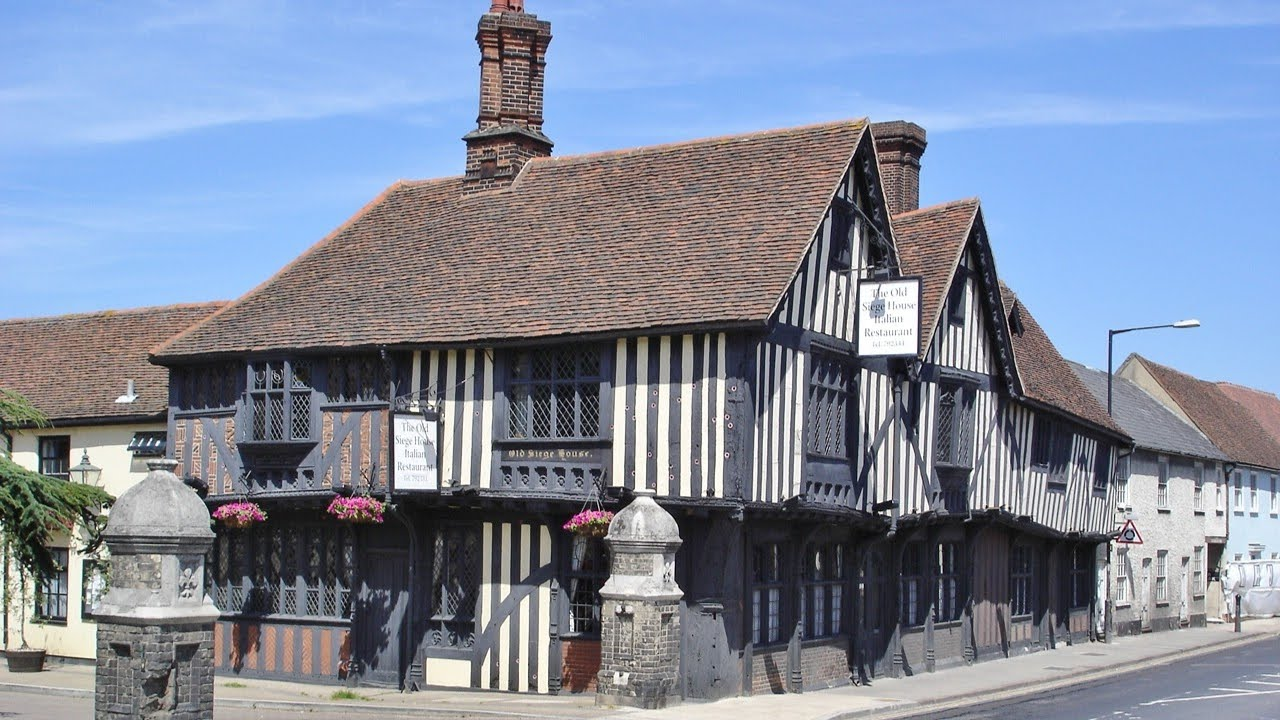
The Old Siege House in East Street still has bullet holes (highlighted by red discs) from the early fighting in the eastern suburbs.

By 2 July the encirclement of the town was completed, severely limiting opportunities for the besieged soldiers to sally out for provisions. On 5 July, Lucas with 400 Cavalry and Lisle with 600 infantry attacked the Suffolk Trained Band guarding the East Gate. The Suffolk men were taken by surprise and were routed; in their enthusiasm, however, the Royalists found themselves too far from the town and were counter-attacked and suffered severe casualties, as well as losing the artillery and provisions they had taken with them.

On the night of 14 July, Fairfax ordered an attack on the Royalist fortification that lay outside the town walls. St John's Abbey and the house of Charles Lucas were captured despite fierce defence. The Royalist fortifications at St Mary's church were completely destroyed by artillery fire and with them the Royalists' main artillery battery.

Following the success of the battle to clear the town's suburbs, on 16 July Fairfax sent a trumpeter with a message offering surrender terms to the Royalists inside the town. Lucas's response was to threaten Fairfax that, if the trumpeter were to appear again with such a message, he would be hanged.

By this time Lord Norwich had heard of the failure of Earl of Holland to come to his relief. A detachment of the New Model Army under Colonel Adrian Scroope at St Neots had defeated the Earl of Holland in a night attack. On 15 July the Royalist cavalry, 1,000 strong, attempted a break-out of Colchester but were intercepted near Boxted. A tangle of engagements which lasted for a couple of days, known as the Battle of Boxted Heath, ended with the Royalists retreating back into Colchester on the 18th. An attempt by two cavalry troops to break out on the night of 18 July also failed. However, on 22 July, Bernard Gascoigne and his remaining cavalry escaped from Colchester via the Maldon road, fighting a fierce engagement with Parliamentary forces, and headed into Cambridgeshire, where they dispersed.

Even though the Royalists still had 3,000 soldiers, Fairfax's position was too strong, and with almost daily reinforcements his forces totalled at least 6,000. Still Lord Norwich could hope that his position would eventually be relieved. He received a letter from Langdale, the Northern Royalist army commander, encouraging the Essex men and promising relief within two weeks. For Lord Norwich, it seemed there still was every reason for them to keep their resolve.

By August, provisions in Colchester had all but run out. Cats, dogs and horses became the staple food. Fairfax refused to allow the townspeople to leave or even to let supplies in to them, despite repeated petitions from outside the town, pleas from Colchester Town council, and even from Lord Norwich. Fairfax's decision was despite the loyalty of the town to Parliament during the First Civil War. Eventually matters became so desperate that the citizens of Colchester were forced to eat soap and candles. Animals, too, were butchered in large numbers. One contemporary source records soldiers using their bread rations to lure stray dogs, which they would then bludgeon to death with their muskets. Throughout the siege, around 600 horses and an unknown number of dogs, cats, and rats were consumed by the garrison.

When the townswomen and children attempted to beg for food at the town gates, they were turned away with nothing by the besieging soldiers. In a last appeal to the humanity of the besiegers, the Royalist commanders sent 500 starving women to the Parliamentarian lines, hoping that they might acquire food by inspiring sympathy. Colonel Rainsborough undermined this plan by ordering the women stripped naked, to the great amusement of his army.

By August, starvation has seriously undermined morale in the garrison. An attempt at a mass breakout was abandoned when the infantry threatened to shoot their officers and throw open the gates. On 24 August news reached Fairfax of Cromwell’s victory at the Battle of Preston. In celebration, the Parliamentary artillery fired salutes and Fairfax had kites flown into the town carrying news of the destruction of the Royalist army. That same day, talks were started to end the siege. Fairfax would not listen to any terms from Lord Norwich, but offered his own which were not open for negotiation. They were that common soldiers and junior officers were granted quarter; however, senior officers must surrender to mercy, whereby no guarantee was given as to how they might be treated.

On the morning of 28 August, the Royalist army laid down their arms. The gates were opened and the victorious Parliamentary regiments entered the town with Lord-General Fairfax at their head. The terms of surrender were that:

- The Lords and Gentlemen were all prisoners of mercy.
- The common soldiers were disarmed and issued with passes to return to their homes after they had sworn an oath not to take up arms against Parliament again. The town was to be preserved from pillage upon paying £14,000 in cash.

== Aftermath ==
The aristocratic Royalist leaders, Lord Norwich, Lord Capel and Lord Loughborough, were to have their fate decided by Parliament; Capel was beheaded for high treason, whereas Norwich and Loughborough were exiled. A military court found Lucas, Lisle, Farre and Gascoigne guilty of high treason and sentenced them to death by firing squad. This sentence was actually rare during the Civil Wars: while Irishmen and deserters were regularly executed, the execution of professional English soldiers was unprecedented. The siege has been seen as an important link between the "relative leniency" of the First English Civil War and the brutality of the Cromwellian conquest of Ireland.

The sentence was justified by Fairfax and Ireton on several grounds. The claims were that Lucas had executed Parliamentary prisoners in cold blood; that he had broken his parole given after the First Civil War; that he had used 'doctored bullets' designed to cause extra suffering; and that the Royalists had continued to fight in an indefensible position, thus causing unnecessary death and suffering. Certainly a reason for executing these and others responsible for the revolt was to show that Parliamentary control was now complete, and that any attempts to continue to fight would be swiftly dealt with.

Overnight Farre managed to escape, and it was discovered that Gascoigne was an Italian citizen, so he was spared the firing squad. However, by the order of Fairfax, Lucas and Lisle were executed in the evening of 28 August. Within days, pamphlets were produced extolling Lucas and Lisle as martyrs to the Royal cause, and today in the grounds of Castle Park, just behind Colchester Castle, there stands a monument marking the site of the execution.

== References in popular culture ==
The siege is commonly believed to have inspired the nursery rhyme Humpty Dumpty, which is said to have been the nickname of a large Royalist cannon strategically placed on the wall next to St Mary's Church. The Parliamentary bombardment of 14 July damaged the wall, causing "Humpty Dumpty" to be destroyed. Other stories attribute the name Humpty Dumpty not to a cannon but to a Royalist sniper, "One-Eyed Thompson", who occupied the belfry of St Mary's Church and was shot down by Parliament forces. The nursery rhyme is first attested in 1797, but apparently the first time the rhyme was linked to the siege was in 1996 on the East Anglia Tourist Board's website.

Fairfax is also spoken of in Milton's 15th sonnet.
