= Vittorio Siri =

Italian mathematician, monk and historian

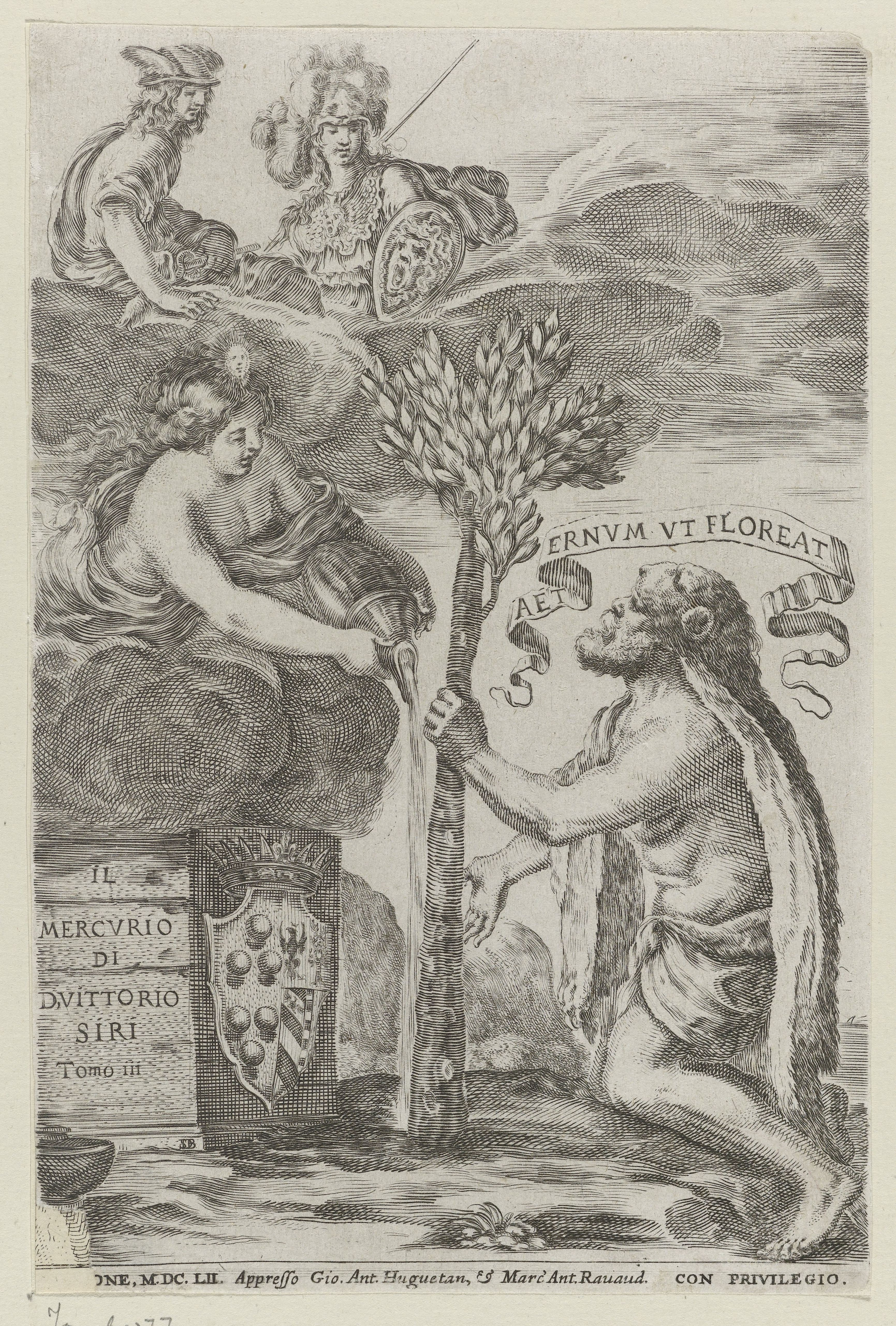
- Title page of the third volume of Vittorio Siri's Il Mercurio, 1652, etched by Stefano della Bella
- Born: Francesco Siri; 2 November 1608; Parma, Duchy of Parma
- Died: 6 October 1685 (aged 76); Paris, Kingdom of France
- Occupations: Christian monk; Historian; Diplomat
- Parent(s): Ottavio Siri; Maria Caterina Siri
- Writing career
- Language: Italian, Latin
- Notable work: Il Mercurio overo historia de' correnti tempi

Vittorio Siri or Francesco Siri (1608–1685) was an Italian mathematician, monk and historian.

== Biography ==
Vittorio Siri was born in Parma in 1608. He entered the Benedictines in 1625, but later left the monastery and became a Secular clergy. A professor of exact sciences in Venice, he forged relationships with diplomatic circles and especially with the French ambassador: hence that interest in political problems and international affairs that eventually became the focus of his interests. In the struggle between Kingdom of France and Spain for hegemony in Europe and in the long disputes over the succession of War of the Mantuan Succession, he was openly Francophile. He was also appointed French resident in Venice and historiographer of the List of French monarchs. Having fallen under suspicion of the Republic, Siri left the lagoon and moved to Modena, a guest of the duke. In 1649 he made his first trip to France, where he later settled.

Siri began to narrate in Political Mercury the events of Europe from 1635 to 1655, in fifteen volumes published between 1644 and 1682. In another work (Memorie recondite) published posthumously between 1676 and 1769 he expounded the events of the principal states of Europe from 1601 to 1640. These are not organically conceived and designed works, because Siri was primarily a diarist and a collector of materials, but taken together they constitute a vast treatment of European history spanning more than half a century. Siri's historiography is avowedly anti-literary in character. Siri made use of things seen and oral testimony, but he also drew on original documents, often quoting entire passages from them. The use of archival materials (which King Cardinal Richelieu minister was the first to allow him) offered him solid information, and on that basis he manifested a vigilant historical sense trained in understanding political facts. Several times Siri affirmed the independence of his judgments, and denied any partiality, even toward France. But in 1640, while in Venice, he began - under the pseudonym Captain Latino Verità - a heated polemic advocating the establishment of a league between the Serenissima, the Pope and France in favor of the "freedom of Italy" oppressed by Spain. Some of his minor writings are still unpublished.

== Life ==
Siri was born in Parma, and studied at the Benedictine convent of San Giovanni Evangelista, Parma, where he pronounced his vows on December 25, 1625. At first, he specialized in geometry, and taught mathematics in Venice. There he befriended the French ambassador and took a liking to political matters.

In 1640, Siri published a book about the occupation of Casale Monferrato (Il politico soldato Monferrino) defending the French position. This earned him the patronage of Cardinal Richelieu, who granted him access to the French archives. Based on what he found in the archives, Siri set up to publish Il Mercurio overo historia de' correnti tempi ('Mercury, or the History of Current Times'), a monumental work in 15 volumes, published in Venice between 1644 and 1682 and translated into French by Jean Baptiste Requier. Besides the Mercurio Politico Siri wrote another historical work, entitled Memorie Recondite, which fills eight volumes. Both these works contain a vast number of valuable authentic documents.

In 1648 Genoese historian and polygraph Giovanni Battista Birago Avogadro offended Siri by publishing a survey of Europe in the year 1642 which he called Mercurio veridico, an undisguised slight of the latter's Mercurio, whose second volume appeared that same year. The affront was answered by Siri in 1653 with a whole book that enumerated Birago's mistakes and charged him with dishonesty (Bollo di D. Vittorio Siri).

Cardinal Mazarin honored Siri with a pension and the title of Counsellor of State, chaplain and historian of the king of France. Siri therefore moved to France in 1649 and from 1655 he lived at the court. In the meanwhile he served as the representative in France of the duke of Parma and wrote newsletters for that duke as well as for the rival duke of Modena. He died in Paris on 6 October 1685.

== Works ==
- Problemata et theoremata geometrica et mecanica, Bologna, 1633.
- Siri, Vittorio (1634). Propositiones mathematicae (in Latin). Bologna: Nicolò Tebaldini.
- Il politico Soldato Monferrino, ovvero discorso politico sopra gli affari di Casale published under the pseudonym Capitano Latino Verità, Casale (Venice), 1640.
- Il Mercurio overo historia de' correnti tempi in 15 volumes in-4°, 1644–1682.
- Memorie recondite in 8 volumes in-4°, 1676–79.

== Bibliography ==
- Affò, Ireneo (1797). Memorie degli scrittori e letterati parmigiani. Vol. V. Parma. pp. 205–336.
