= Charles Round =

English cricketer (1885–1945)

Personal information
- Full name: Charles James Round
- Born: 3 September 1885; Kensington, London, England
- Died: 6 October 1945 (aged 60); Birch Hall, Essex, England
- Relatives: James Round (father); Charles Higginbotham (brother-in-law); Herman de Zoete (brother-in-law)

Domestic team information
- Years: Team
- 1921: Essex

Career statistics
Competition	First-class
Matches	2
Runs scored	9
Batting average	2.25
100s/50s	0/0
Top score	8
Balls bowled	78
Wickets	1
Bowling average	62.00
5 wickets in innings	0
10 wickets in match	0
Best bowling	1/49
Catches/stumpings	0/–
- Source: Cricinfo, 21 July 2013

Charles James Round (3 September 1885 – 6 October 1945) was an English cricketer.

Round was born at Kensington in London in 1885, the son of James Round. His father was the Member of Parliament for East Essex before becoming MP for Harwich at the 1885 general election later in the year. His family had owned Colchester Castle before James Round inherited Birch Hall in 1867, and Charles Round grew up there and in Colchester. He was educated at Winchester College before going up to Exeter College, Oxford in 1905.

His father had played first-class cricket for Oxford University and was a member of MCC, serving on the club's Committee from 1869 to 1871. He played for Essex County Cricket Club in the years before the team was promoted to first-class status in 1894. Charles served as a member of the Essex Committee between 1913 and 1924. He captained the team's Second XI in 1914 before the outbreak of World War I, during which he served as an officer in the Essex Yeomanry. His only two first-class appearances came during the 1921 Colchester Festival. He scored nine runs and took one wicket.

Round continued to play cricket for the Gentlemen of Essex amateur team and Free Foresters into the 1930s. He died at Birch Hall in 1945 aged 60.

== Bibliography ==
- Pracy D (2023) Gentlemen and players of Essex: the amateur and professional cricketers of Essex County Cricket Club, 1876–1979. (Available online at The Association of Cricket Statisticians and Historians. Retrieved 2025-06-11.)
