= John Haynes Holmes =

Unitarian minister and co-founder of the NAACP and the ACLU

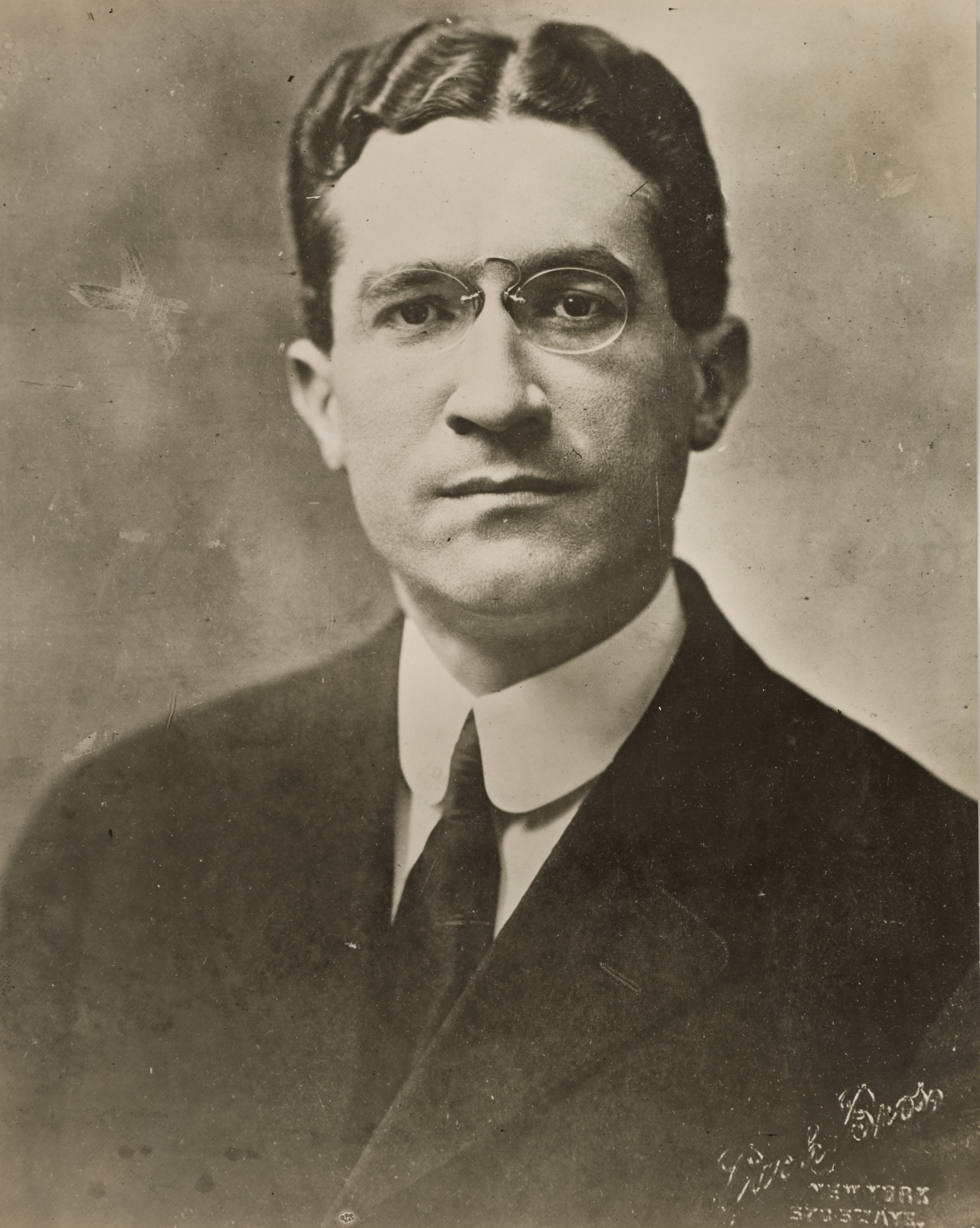

President of the American Civil Liberties Union
- In office 1940–1950
- Preceded by: Harry F. Ward
- Succeeded by: Ernest Angell

Personal details
- Born: November 29, 1879 Philadelphia, Pennsylvania, U.S.
- Died: April 3, 1964 (aged 84) Manhattan, New York, U.S.
- Spouse: Madeleine Baker (after 1904)
- Relations: Newland H. Holmes (cousin)
- Children: 2
- Education: Harvard University (BA, MDiv)

John Haynes Holmes (November 29, 1879 – April 3, 1964) was an American Unitarian minister, pacifist, and co-founder of the NAACP and the ACLU. He is noted for his anti-war activism.

== Early life ==
Holmes was born in Philadelphia on November 29, 1879, a descendant of John Holmes of Colchester, Essex. That John Holmes was a Messenger of the General Court of Plymouth Colony and the executioner of Thomas Granger. Newland H. Holmes, President of the Massachusetts Senate, was his cousin.

He attended public schools of Malden, a suburb of Boston, and studied at Harvard, graduating in 1902, then attended Harvard Divinity School, from which he graduated in 1904 and was immediately called to his first church in Dorchester, Massachusetts as a Protestant clergyman.

== Career ==
In 1907 Holmes was called to the Church of the Messiah (Unitarian) in New York City and served as its Senior Minister until 1918, when he left the American Unitarian Association (AUA) because of the AUA's policy requiring Unitarian ministers to pledge their support for the United States participation in World War I. Among those in his congregation there was not universal support for his stand against the USA participation in World War I, but his church did support his principled stand on the subject. Consequently, his church became non-denominational and renamed itself the Community Church of New York. Members of the church, however, insisted that the church retain its AUA membership. Holmes was named Senior Minister of the new church, and served until his retirement in 1949, when he became Minister Emeritus. He rejoined the AUA in 1960, just before the Unitarian and Universalist churches merged; newly accepted again into AUA fellowship, he was then featured in the last AUA yearbook published before the merger.

On May 25, 1919, Holmes was one of the speakers at a rally held in Madison Square Gardens, which demanded the end of US government support for the White forces against the Red forces in Russia.

Holmes engaged in interfaith efforts, working closely with Rabbi Stephen Samuel Wise of New York. The book Rabbi and Minister details this friendship and their working relationship on social, religious and political causes. Holmes was also among the leading American Christian supporters of Zionism in the 1930s. He was a leading member of the Pro-Palestine Federation, which called on the British government to keep Palestine open to Jewish immigrants fleeing persecution in Europe. At the same time, Holmes favored cultural forms of Zionism that stopped short of calling for Jewish statehood. He also publicized the work of Gandhi, from his pulpit, and describes his meetings and interactions with the Mahatma in his book My Gandhi. Later, He was a recipient of the Gandhi Peace Award.

Although primarily a minister, Holmes helped found the National Association for the Advancement of Coloured People (NAACP) in 1909, and the American Civil Liberties Union (ACLU) in 1920, serving as its chairman from 1940 to 1950, after the resignation of Harry F. Ward. He was succeeded as ACLU Chairman by Ernest Angell.

His varied pursuits included authoring numerous books, hymns, and a play, If This Be Treason, which had a brief run on Broadway. The play crystalized his opposition to war, personifying the peaceful impulses of the majority of people on both sides of a conflict, (in the case of the play, between the USA and Japan). He was also a popular lecturer and debater. For example, Holmes argued in favor of Prohibition in a public debate with Clarence Darrow. In the 1930s, he published a pamphlet entitled "Four Reforms Which Would Save the World," in which he advocated for the single tax on land values proposed by the economist Henry George, the form of socialism portrayed in the utopian novels Looking Backward and Equality by Edward Bellamy, widespread availability of birth control, and the abolition of war.

=== Opposition from Dr. Seuss ===
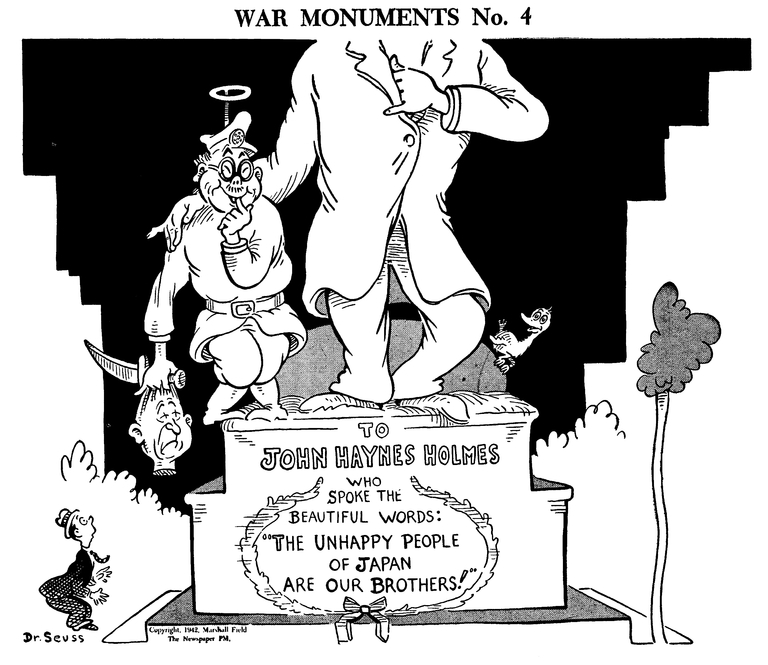
The cartoon in question, depicting Holmes as allied with supposedly traitorous Japanese Americans

There was an outcry after a cartoon by Theodor Geisel (better known as Dr. Seuss) mocking Holmes was published in the New York newspaper PM on January 13, 1942. Geisel responded January 21, 1942 (ellipses in original):

In response to the letters defending John Haynes Holmes ... sure, I believe in love, brotherhood and a cooing white pigeon on every man's roof. I even think it's nice to have pacifists and strawberry festivals ... in between wars.

But right now, when the Japs are planting their hatchets in our skulls, it seem like a hell of a time for us to smile and warble: 'Brothers!' It is a rather flabby battlecry.

If we want to win, we've got to kill Japs, whether it depresses John Haynes Holmes or not. We can get palsy-walsy afterward with those that are left.

Holmes' stand as a pacifist in both world wars was neither popular nor easy. He faced expulsion from his denomination during World War I if he did not disavow his pacifist views; he resigned his membership in the American Unitarian Association as a result, and the split was not healed for decades. Geisel's criticism is an example of the scorn and ridicule Holmes faced as a result of his strong views, which he vigorously defended.

Holmes had announced his pacifism before America entered World War I. On April 3, 1917 he preached on A Statement to my People on the Eve of War, declaring: "Therefore would I make it plain that, so long as I am your minister, this Church will answer no military summons. ... But so long as I am priest, this altar shall be consecrated to human brotherhood, and before it shall be offered worship only to that one God and Father of us all, 'Who hath made of one blood all nations of men for to dwell together on the face of the earth.'"

== Personal life ==
In 1904, Holmes married Madeleine Hosmer Baker. They had two children, Roger Holmes (who became a professor at Mount Holyoke College) and Frances Holmes (who married Morris L. Brown).

His wife died in 1961 and he died on April 3, 1964, aged eighty-four, at his home at 10 Park Avenue in New York City. Holmes' personal papers are held in the U.S. Library of Congress, open to scholars and researchers. His funeral, held at the Community Church at 40 East 35th Street, was conducted by his successor, the Rev. Dr. Donald S. Harrington, and attended by 1,200 "friends and admirers."

== Works ==
- Is Death the End? (1915)
- New Wars for Old (1916)
- Palestine To-Day and To-Morrow: A Gentile's Survey of Zionism (1929)
- A Sensible Man's View of Religion (1932)
- Is Suicide Justifiable?, John Day (1934)
- The Affirmation of Immortality (1947)
- My Gandhi (1953)
- I Speak for Myself (1959)
