= John Holmes (Messenger of the Plymouth Court) =

American settler (born 1603)

John Holmes (1603–1652 or later), gentleman, was an early settler and official of the Plymouth Colony who arrived there before late 1632. He served as Messenger of the Court of Plymouth from 1638 to 1645 or later, and in that office carried out one of the first executions in the colony.

Holmes was baptized 22 February 1603 in St. Nicholas, Colchester, the only son of Thomas Holmes, gentleman alias maltster. His father, a first cousin of Robert Middleton, esquire and MP for Colchester in 1579, held the lease of Colchester Castle from Charles, Lord Stanhope and was keeper of the Essex county gaol there. John married a woman named Sarah, surname unknown. Their son Thomas was baptized in St. Runwald in 1628. In October 1629 Holmes witnessed the will of his brother-in-law Tobias Moreton, gent., son of William Mor(e)ton, Archdeacon of Northumberland and Durham; this is the last known record of Holmes in England, although son Thomas appears to have grown up in England in the household of Tobias's widow, John's sister Susan.

Holmes's first appearance in the Plymouth records was on 16 October 1632. He served in September 1638 on the jury that sentenced Arthur Peach, Thomas Jackson, and Richard Stinnings to death for the robbery and murder of Penowanyanquis. Peach's lover, Dorothy Temple, who was Stephen Hopkins's indentured servant, was pregnant at the time of Peach's execution; when Hopkins refused to honor her contract, Holmes bought out her servitude.

On 4 December 1638 Holmes was sworn in as Messenger, succeeding Joshua Pratt. Among the duties entailed in this office were those of bailiff, jailkeeper, and executioner. In the latter capacity on 8 September 1642 Holmes hanged Thomas Granger, a teenager convicted of bestiality. It was the first execution of a juvenile in the territory of what was to become the United States.

Holmes had two known children in Plymouth, John (c. 1636–1697) and Nathaniel (c. 1643–1727), via whom he had numerous descendants to the present day including John Haynes Holmes (1879–1964), American churchman and pacifist, and Newland Howard Holmes (1891–1965), President of the Massachusetts Senate. Holmes's wife died in 1650, and the last record of John Holmes in Plymouth was 7 October 1651. The will of Susan Morton implies he was alive in June 1652, and the wording suggests the possibility he had returned to England by that time, but the date and place of his death are unknown.

Holmes Reservation, a conservation parcel in Plymouth, was donated to the city by a descendant, Francis C. Holmes, Chief Executive of the Plymouth Cordage Company from 1911 to 1938.
