= James Parnell =

- Born: Retford, Nottinghamshire, England
- Died: 1656; Colchester Castle

James Parnel or Parnell (baptised 1636 – 1656) was an English Quaker preacher and author. As a teenager he became a nonconformist, visited George Fox in prison in 1653, and joined the Society of Friends. He is known as the "Boy Martyr".

== Personal life ==
Parnell was born in East Retford, Nottinghamshire, the son of Thomas and Sarah Parnell, and was apprentised to his father. His parents were well off and he was sent to the town's grammar school, King Edward VI Grammar School, (which was fee paying).

== Religious life ==
According to the Reverend W. P. McFerran of Retford, writing in the Retford Times in 1947, at the age of 15 Parnell became concerned about his soul. He found "no satisfaction" amongst the priests of Retford so left home to travel. In Balby he came across a group that “waited together in silence to become instruments in the hand of the Lord”. This group were forerunners of the Society of Friends or Quakers.

When he was 16, Parnell walked 150 miles from Retford to Carlisle to meet George Fox, the founder of the Quaker movement, who was imprisoned in Carlisle. Parnell left a committed Quaker. After this he began preaching to all who would listen, but this was seen as a challenge to the established church and he clashed several times with the authorities.ref name=mcferran/>

In 1655 at the age of 18 he preached in St Nicholas' Church, Colchester and then spent a week in discussion and argument; many were convinced by his message and went on to found a Quaker Meeting in the town. The Quaker Stephen Crisp (who was aged 27) was converted by Parnell at that time. He subsequently wrote of him: 'He was of a poor appearance, a mere youth, coming against giants; yet the wisdom of man was made to bow before the Spirit by which he spoke'.

== Arrest and death ==
Parnell was arrested on 4 July 1655 as he walked through Colchester after disrupting a church service in Great Coggeshall. He was charged with blasphemy and other offences and was taken to the county gaol in Colchester Castle. During his trial he was acquitted of all charges by the jury, but the Magistrate fined him £40, which he either refused to pay or could not pay (he had been disinherited by his parents). He was returned to jail where he was kept in terrible conditions and forced to climb a rope to reach his food. Local Quakers were prevented from helping him. By the spring he was so weak that he could not eat, dying on 10 April 1656.

The authorities said that Parnell had died through fasting. But according to historian William Sewel, "So great was the malice and envy of his persecutors, that to cover their guilt and shame, they spread among the people, that by immoderate fasting, and afterwards with too greedy eating, he had shortened his days. But this was a wicked lie."

Joseph Besse wrote in Sufferings that the gaolor’s wife beat Parnell and told her servant to beat him; sent his food to other prisoners; refused to let his friends bring him a bed; had him placed in a hole in the castle wall “not so wide as some baker’s ovens,” which could only be accessed by climbing a ladder and then a rope. Besse notes that Parnell fell and was “so wounded in his Head, and bruised in his Body, that he was taken up for dead.” He was placed in another airless hole lower down in the castle wall. Friends offered to take his place while he recovered but their requests were denied. Besse wrote that he "died a Youth... but approved himself a strong Man in Christ".

Seen as a martyr, his death attracted more people to the Quaker cause. This meant the circumstances of his death were hotly debated at the time. It was also the subject of a ballad set to the tune of "Summer Time" which, amongst other things, accused Parnell of starving himself to death.

“So will I do James Parnel said/Because you all shall know and see/That I am a Prophet of the Lord/And them that will believe in me. The Quakers Fear (1656)

The Quakers presented their version of events in The Lambs Defence Against Lyes (Giles Calvert, 1656)- 'A true testimony given concerning the sufferings and death of James Parnell'. This tells how one William Talcott offered to pay a bond so that Parnell could recover at his house to be returned to gaol when he was fully recovered. It also included a letter by one Thomas Shortland who offered to take Parnell's place in gaol. In this pamphlet a letter from Parnell himself details the verbal and physical abuse he suffered. While another letter by Shortland disputes the official line that Parnell had abstained from food then eaten up 'a quart of milk thick crumb’d with white bred'. Shortland said he had brought the milk and bread, there was only a pint and a half, and that both he and Parnell had only eaten a small amount. The rest, he said, he took home with him.

Parnell was buried in an unmarked grave in the grounds of Colchester Castle. A plaque commemorating his life has been placed in the cell where he died.

== Reputation ==
According to Charlotte Fell Smith, the number of Friends in Colchester in 1692 was 1,000 out of a total population of 6,852. Smith attributed this to the "seed sown by one earnest young minister aged only 18 years".

When Parnell's collected works were published in 1675, there were personal testimonies by Steven Crisp, Samuel Cater and Thomas Bayles in the introduction.

Parnell's story was subsequently told to children all over the world by members of the Society of Friends, and he became known as ‘the boy martyr’, the first person to die for the Quaker faith. He was not the first Quaker to die for the faith; more properly he was the first well-known figure to die.

A street is named after him in Colchester.

== Works ==
Parnell wrote:

- A Trial of Faith, wherein is discovered the ground of the Faith of the Hypocrite, which perisheth, and the Faith of the Saints, which is founded upon the Everlasting Rock, London 1654. It was twice reprinted in 1655, and again in 1658. It was translated into Dutch in 1656, into French as L'Espreuve de la Foy, 1660, and into German, Amsterdam, 1681.
- The Fruits of a Fast, appointed by the Churches gathered against Christ and His Kingdom, London, Giles Calvert, 1655.
- The Trumpet of the Lord blowne, or a Blast against Pride and Oppression, London, Giles Calvert, 1655.
- A Shield of the Truth, or the Truth of God cleared from Scandalls and Reproaches, London, 1655.
- The Watcher … or a Discovery of the Ground and End of all Forms, Professions, Sects, and Opinions, London, 1655.
- Goliath's Head cut off with his own Sword; In a Combat betwixt Little David, the Young Stripling … and Great Goliath, the Proud Boaster, London, 1655. This was in answer to a paper issued against him by Thomas Drayton of Abbot's Ripon, Huntingdonshire.

He also wrote from prison, shortly before his death, epistles and addresses, as well as A Warning to all People (translated into Dutch, 1670), all of which were printed in A Collection of the several Writings given forth from the Spirit of the Lord, through … James Parnel, &c. Published in the year 1675.
