= A Slight Demonstration =

2007 book

A Slight Demonstration: Decatur, October 1864, Clumsy Beginning of Gen. John B. Hood's Tennessee Campaign
- Author: Noel Carpenter
- Language: English
- Genre: United States - History - Civil War
- Publisher: Legacy Books & Letters
- Publication date: November 2007
- Publication place: United States
- Media type: Print (Hardback)
- Pages: 197 pp (first edition, hardback)
- ISBN: 978-0-615-14866-3
- OCLC: 191317729
- Dewey Decimal: 973.7/461 22
- LC Class: F334.D2 C37 2007

A Slight Demonstration: Decatur, October 1864, Clumsy Beginning of Gen. John B. Hood's Tennessee Campaign is a 2007 book about the 1864 Civil War Battle of Decatur, a pivotal event in Confederate General John B. Hood's disastrous Tennessee Campaign late in the war, in which a Union force of only 2-5,000 soldiers prevented Hood's 23,000 strong army from crossing the Tennessee River. It was written by Noel Carpenter, a former Decatur native and Air Force officer. The book is published by Legacy Books & Letters of Austin, Texas. It is the first book solely devoted to the Battle of Decatur.

== Synopsis ==
In the book, Carpenter contends that the engagement at Decatur played a major role in the outcome of Hood's campaign. Hood had intended to cross the Tennessee River to go to Nashville, where he planned to cut off the supply lines of Union General William T. Sherman, who had just taken Atlanta. The delay caused by his inability to cross the river gave Union forces in Nashville time to prepare a defense, such that when Hood's forces finally arrived, they were decimated.

Carpenter provides the richest detail available to date about the engagement at Decatur, including the important contribution of the Fourteenth Colored Infantry, an African-American regiment whose brave action stalled Hood's forces long enough to effectively carry the day. Union General Thomas Granger considered it the highlight of the battle.

Carpenter's book was published posthumously by his daughter, Carol Powell. Carpenter died in 2000 at the age of 82, having devoted the last 12 years of his life to his book about the battle that took place in the town of his birth.

=== Critical reception ===
University of Arkansas professor Daniel E. Sutherland, Co-Editor of The Civil War in the West, a series from the University of Arkansas Press, has said, "I found Carpenter's account and analysis of events at Decatur thoroughly readable and quite convincing," and "I came away from his narrative believing that historians may, indeed, not have given events at Decatur their due."
