= Dora Batty =

Dora Margaret Batty (12 January 1891 – 10 July 1966) was a British designer, working in illustration, poster design, pottery and textiles.

== Biography ==
Batty was born in Colchester, Essex, the youngest of three daughters of Rev. Thomas Batty and Elizabeth Cooke Hopwood Batty. Her father, a Congregational minister, was pastor for 40 years at Stockwell Congregational Chapel in Colchester. She attended the Chelmsford School of Science and Art, where she won some prizes.

Batty designed posters for the Underground Group and for London Transport between 1921 and 1938, producing over 50 different designs in a variety of different styles. From 1932, she taught in the School of Textiles at the Central School of Arts and Crafts. In 1950, she was appointed the Head of School, apost she held until she retired in 1958.

Batty also designed textiles for Helios and ceramics for the Poole Pottery and for Carter & Co, as well as advertisements for Mac Fisheries and K Shoes. She also worked as a book illustrator. She lived in London for many years, but died in Essex in 1966.

== Selected works ==
London Underground Posters

- Kew Gardens, foxgloves, 1924
- From country to the heart of town, 1925
- For Picnics and Rambles from Town to Open Country
- Crocuses are out, 1927
- Come out and see it, 1927
- Daffodils are blooming, 1927
- See London's Gardens, 1927
- The Underground brings all good things nearer, 1930
- RAF Display at Colindale Station, 1932
- Trooping the Colour, 1936

Book illustration

- W. H. Davies, A Poet's Alphabet, 1925
- W. H. Davies, The Song of Love, 1926
- W. H. Davies, A Poet's Calendar, 1927
- How to Buy and Sell Money The Curwen Press, 1929 (contributor)
- Shell-Mex and BP Ltd, The Care of Your Tractor, n.d. ca 1930
- The B.B.C. Year-Book, 1931, 1932 and 1933 (dustwrapper)
- Geoffrey Holme, The Children's Art Book, 1939 (contributor)
- William Cowper, John Gilpin, [1942] (Bantam Picture Book No. 17)
- The Giant without a Heart. An old Norse fairy tale, 1944

Ceramics

- Hans Van Lemmen, Art Deco Tiles, 2012
