= Holmes Reservation =

Conservation area in Plymouth, Massachusetts, US

Coordinates: 41°58′9″N 70°40′43″W

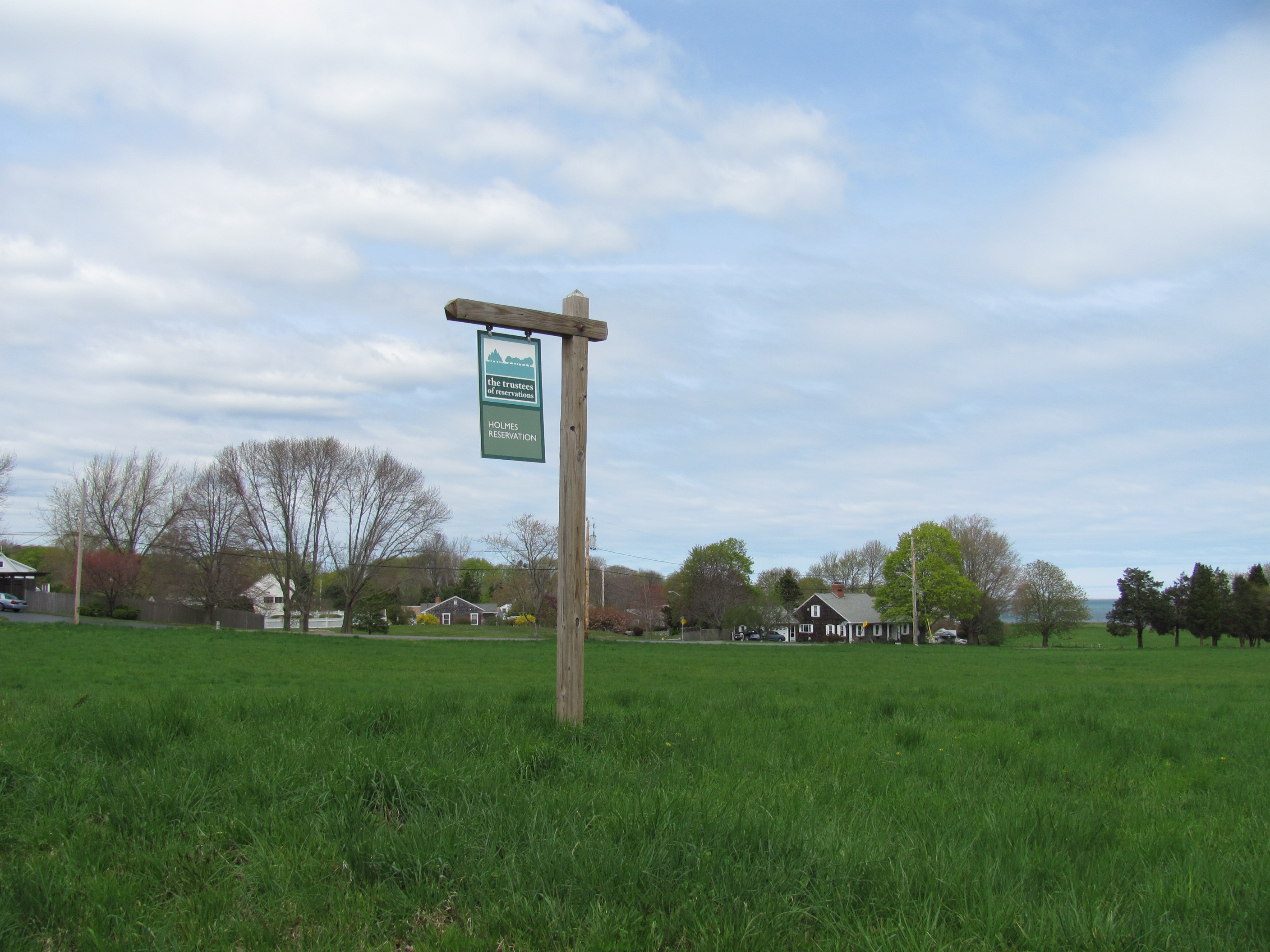
Holmes Reservation

Holmes Reservation is a conservation parcel located in Plymouth, Massachusetts. During the American Revolution, the land was used as a muster ground for the Plymouth militia. The property is owned by The Trustees of Reservations, starting with a donation, with endowment, by the Holmes family (descendants of John Holmes, an early settler of Plymouth and Messenger of the Court there) in 1944.
