= Thomas Granger =

16-year old American boy executed in 1642

- Born: c. 1625; England
- Died: September 8, 1642 (aged 17); Plymouth Colony
- Known for: First juvenile executed on United States territory
- Status: Executed by hanging
- Conviction: Buggery
- Penalty: Death

Thomas Granger or Graunger (1625 – September 8, 1642) was one of the 32 people hanged in the Plymouth Colony (the first hanged in Plymouth or in any of the colonies of New England being John Billington) and the first known juvenile to be sentenced to death and executed in the territory of today's United States. He was a servant to Love Brewster, of Duxbury, in the Plymouth Colony of British North America. Graunger, at the age of 17, was convicted of "buggery with a mare, a cow, two goats, divers sheep, two calves, and a turkey", according to court records of September 7, 1642.

Graunger reportedly confessed to his crimes in court privately to local magistrates, and upon indictment, publicly to ministers and the jury, being sentenced to "death by hanging until he was dead". He was hanged by John Holmes, Messenger of the Court, on September 8, 1642. Before Graunger's execution, following the laws set down in Leviticus 20:15 ("And if a man shall lie with a beast, he shall surely be put to death: and ye shall slay the beast"), the animals involved were slaughtered before his face and thrown into a large pit dug for their disposal, no use being made of any part of them.

An account of Granger's acts is recorded in Gov. William Bradford's diary Of Plymouth Plantation 1620–1647. Granger's crime represents the colonies' first recorded act of bestiality.

== See also ==
- Claudine de Culam
