= Churches in Colchester =

Church buildings in Colchester, England

Coordinates: 51.890°N 0.901°E

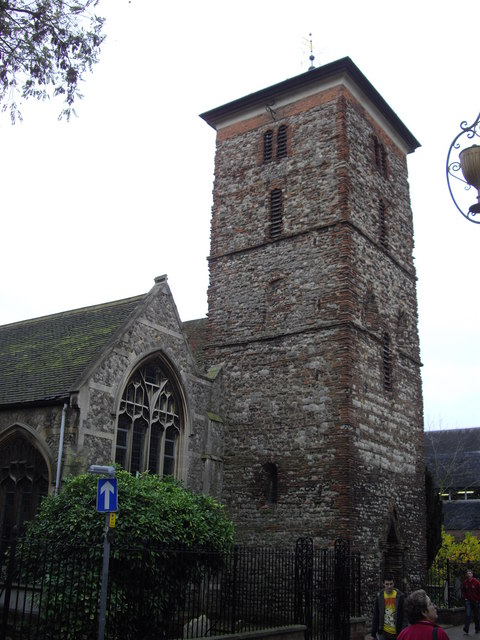
Holy Trinity Church, Colchester, the tower of which is early 11th century Anglo-Saxon

Colchester in Essex, England, has a number of notable churches.

== Early churches ==
=== Butt Road Roman Church ===
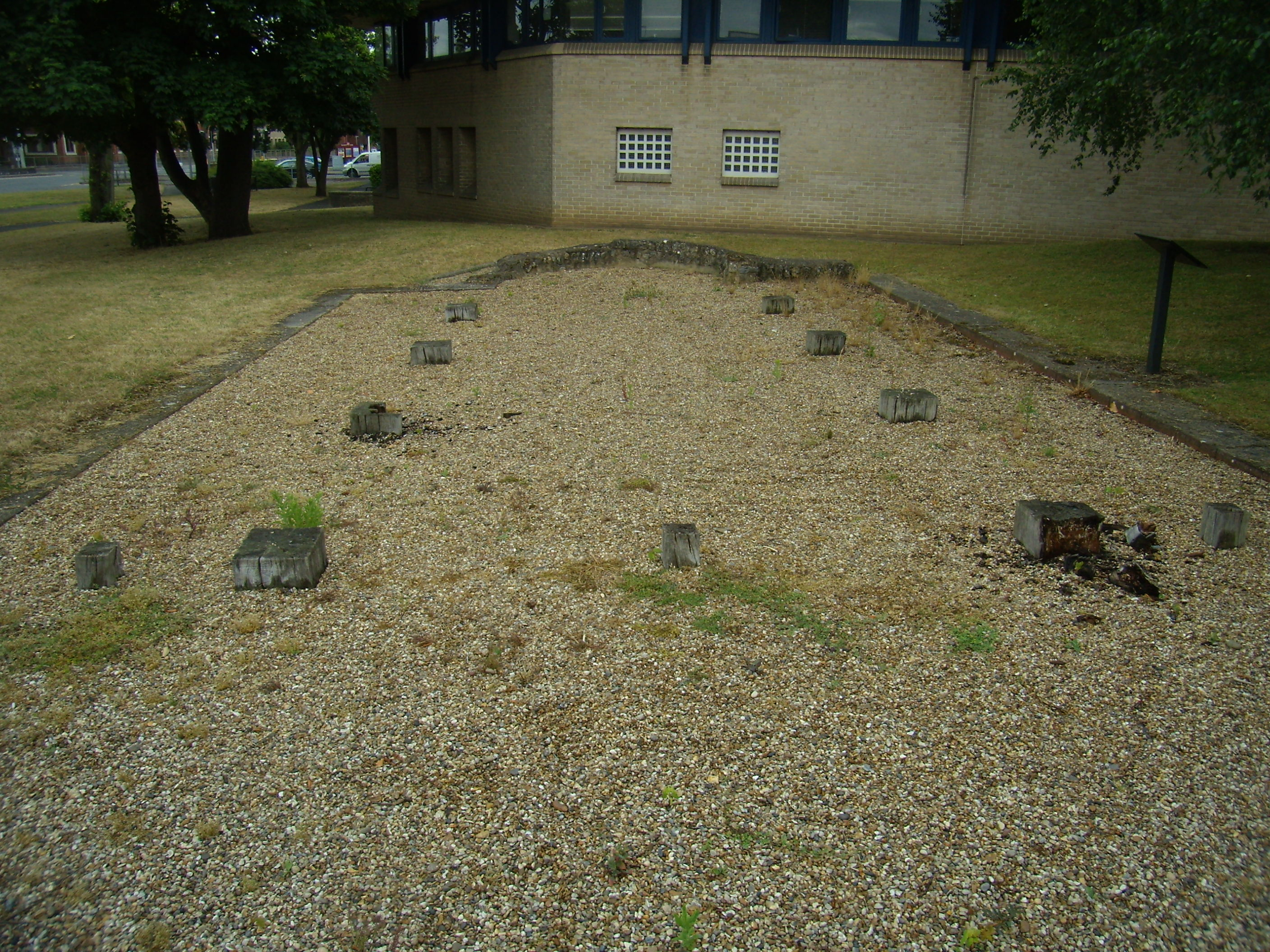
The visible remains of the Roman church

Excavations in the 1980s for a new police station near the Maldon Road roundabout unearthed 371 Roman graves and a long narrow building. The building was built between AD 320 and 340. Oriented east to west, an apse was added to the east end in a later phase. The building was divided by a wooden screen and two rows of posts ran down the eastern half forming aisles. The building has been interpreted on strong circumstantial evidence as an early Christian church. If this is correct, it is probably the earliest known Christian church in Britain. The remains have been preserved and are visible from the public footpath.

=== St Helen's Chapel ===
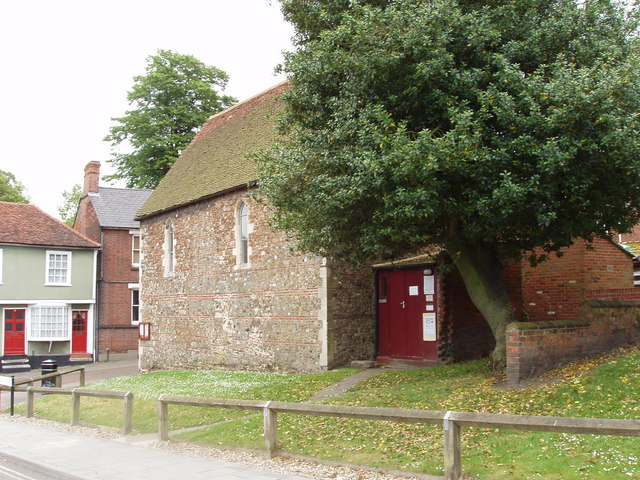
St Helen's Chapel

Dedicated to Saint Helena, the 14th-century Chronicle of Colchester states that the chapel was founded by the saint herself and refounded by Eudo Dapifer in 1076. Most of the present building dates from the 12th and 13th centuries, incorporating Roman brick. Excavations in 1981 and 1984 in Maidenburgh Street, have shown that the Roman stone and brickwork under the north and east walls were part of a theatre. In the 14th century, chantries were established in the chapel, but it was closed in 1539 after the Dissolution of St John's Abbey and it went into secular use. It became a house, a school, a library, a Quaker meeting-house and a warehouse. In the 1880s, the Round family who owned the castle, had the chapel restored by William Butterfield. After use as a clergy meeting-room and a parish hall, it was used by the Castle Museum as a store. Since 2000, it has again been used as a place of worship by the Eastern Orthodox Parish of St Helen.

== Medieval churches ==
=== All Saints ===
All Saints’ Church is a twelfth-century church located in Colchester High Street. In 1953 it was declared a redundant church. The building is now the home of the Natural History Museum, Colchester. It is situated opposite Colchester Castle at MapRef TL 999252. The church has a fine flint-built tower of the 15th century. However the rest of the building was extensively rebuilt in the mid 19th century.

=== St Botolph's Priory ===
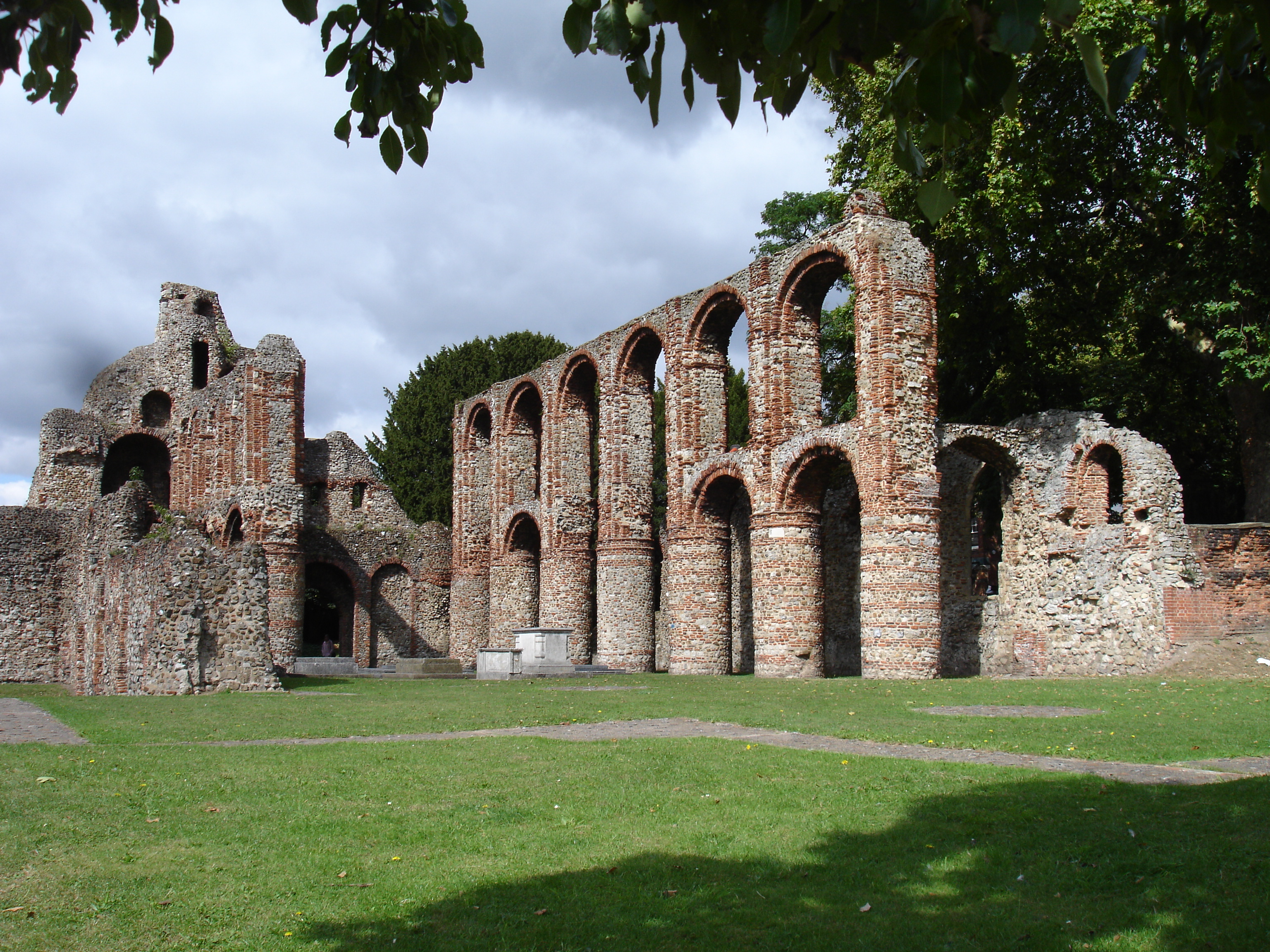
St Botolph's Priory

The Augustinian priory of St Botolph, generally called "St Botolph's Priory", was also established in the 11th century. This adopted the Augustinian Order in around 1200 and became the mother church of the order in Britain. At the Dissolution of the Monasteries the priory church of St Botolph became the parish church. It was also used by the Corporation on civic occasions until the English Civil War. In 1650 the church was described as burnt and ruined after the Siege of Colchester, and it has been left in ruins. Until the construction of a new church in 1837, parishioners attended All Saints’ Church instead, although burials continued in the churchyard.

=== St Giles, St John's Green ===
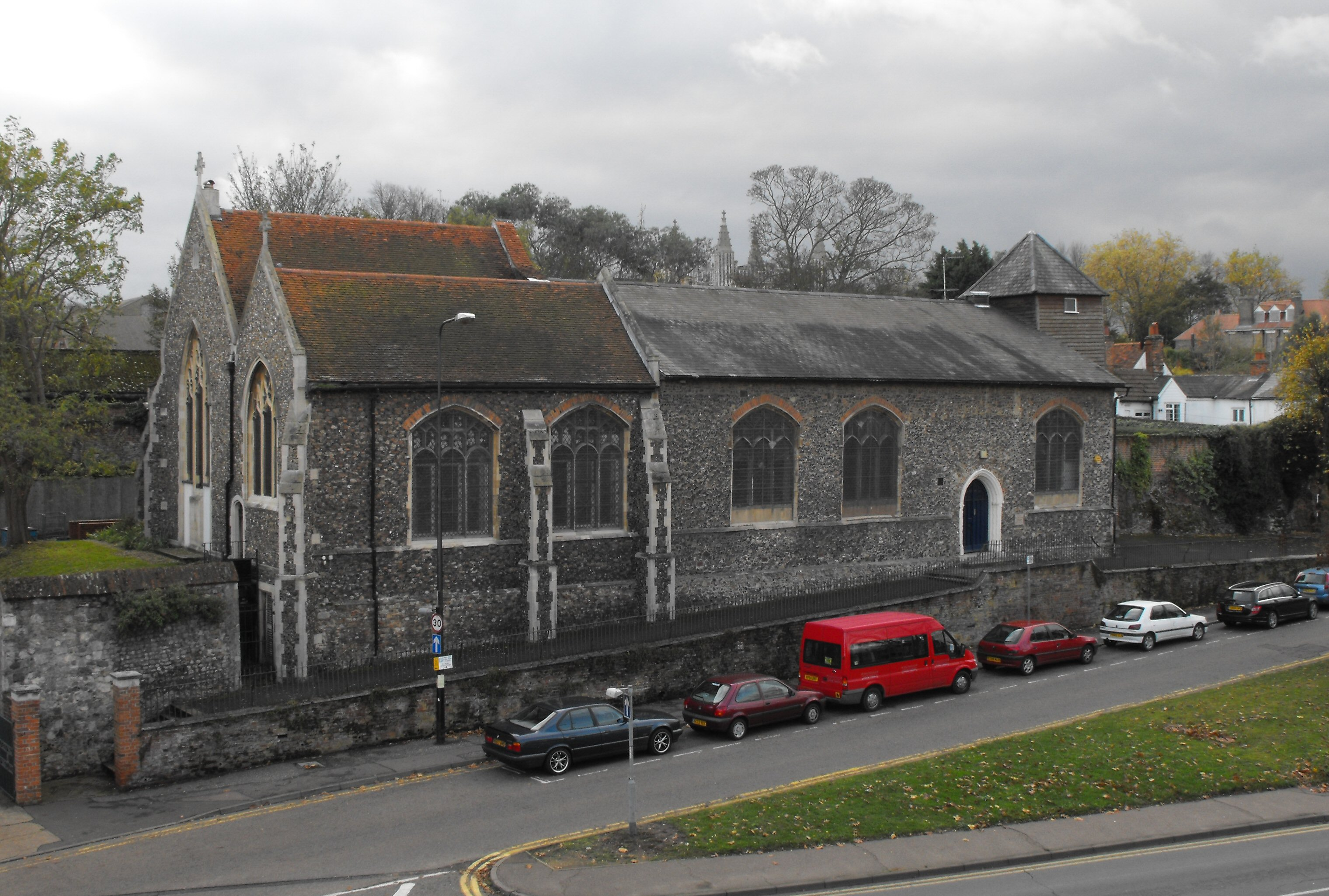
St Giles' Church

Originally built on part of St John's Abbey cemetery around AD 1150, contains work from every century since. It was declared redundant in 1956 and then used as a St. John Ambulance depot until 1975 when it was converted into a masonic centre.

=== Holy Trinity ===
Holy Trinity is the oldest surviving church building in Colchester. It is on Trinity Street in the city centre. Parts of the church tower are Anglo-Saxon, believed to date from about 1020. The Saxon doorway in the west side of the tower has a triangular head: a feature common in Anglo-Saxon windows but unusual in a doorway. An earlier church building may have existed on the site. The churchyard includes the graves of William Gilberd, discoverer of electromagnetism and physician to Elizabeth I, and the composer John Wilbye.

=== St James the Great ===
St James the Great is a Church of England church on East Hill in Colchester. The oldest part of the church is Norman, dating from the 12th century. The nave, tower, and two aisles were built between the 13th and 15th centuries. The chancel and the Chapels of Our Lady and Saint Peter and Saint Paul were added around 1500. The radical priest John Ball, a leader of the Peasants' Revolt of 1381 preached at the church.

=== St John's Abbey ===
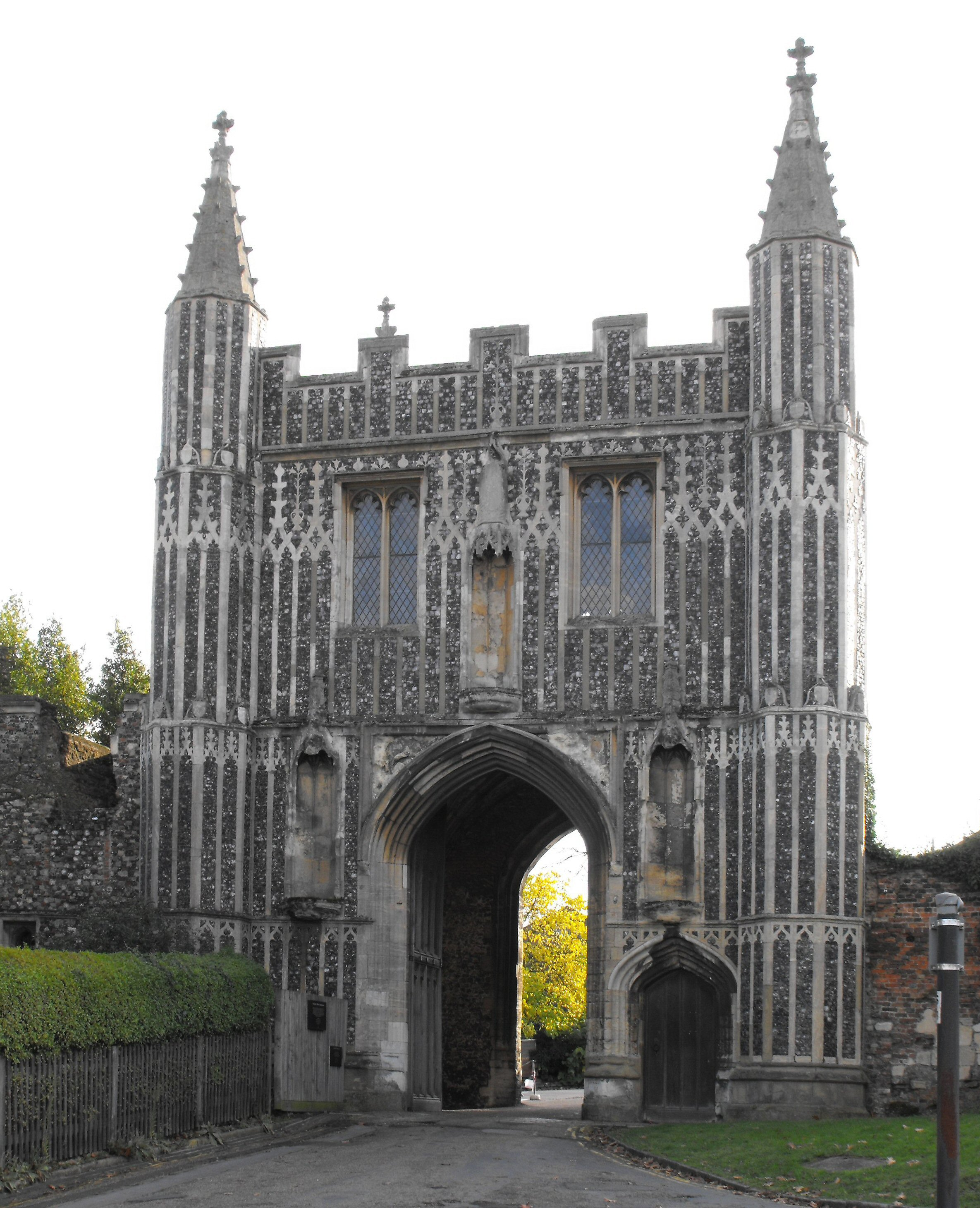
The Abbey Gate

The Benedictine abbey of St John the Baptist, generally known as "St John's Abbey," founded in 1096, had a late 11th-century church until the Dissolution of the Monasteries and the execution of its abbot in 1539. Now all that remains is the gatehouse on St John's Green, which dates from the 15th century, and the church of St Giles, used as the parish church of the abbey.

=== St Martin's ===
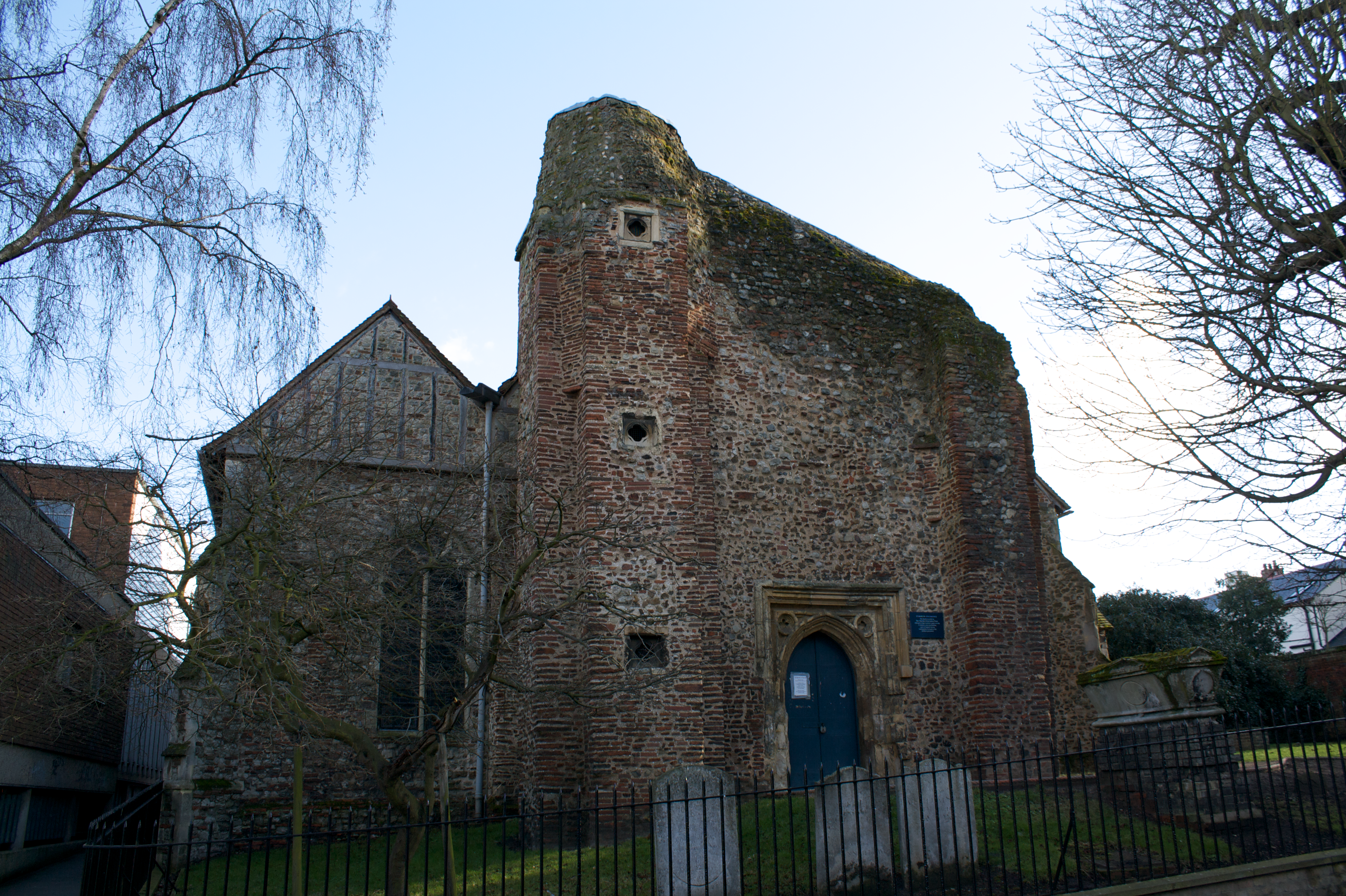
St Martin's

St Martin's is a 12th-century church that survives in its original Norman form. The church is on West Stockwell Street in the old Dutch Quarter. Its tower was damaged in the English Civil War and was never repaired. Today the church building is in the care of The Churches Conservation Trust and is used as a community venue. The key is available from the Colchester Borough Council museum service.

=== St Mary-at-the-Walls ===
On Church Street, to the east of Balkerne Hill is St Mary-at-the-Walls, built against the Roman walls and overlooking the western suburbs of the city. First recorded in 1206, the church has a notable history. It is the site where 23 Protestant martyrs were executed by burning in the reign of the Mary I. In the English Civil War a Royalist army used the church tower as a gun emplacement, which resulted in its destruction by New Model Army siege batteries. The theory that the tower gave rise to the nursery rhyme Humpty Dumpty is now probably disproved. The lower part of the tower is Norman; the upper parts were rebuilt in 1729 and the top in 1911. The rest of the church was rebuilt in 1872 to designs by Arthur Blomfield. Philip Morant, the Essex historian, was Rector 1737–1770. There was a further major rebuild in 1872.

In 1978 the parish was united with Christ Church in a new building in Ireton Road. The old church was made redundant; the bell was moved to St Leonard's in Lexden and the organ to Brentwood Cathedral. In 1980 the building was reopened as Colchester Arts Centre.

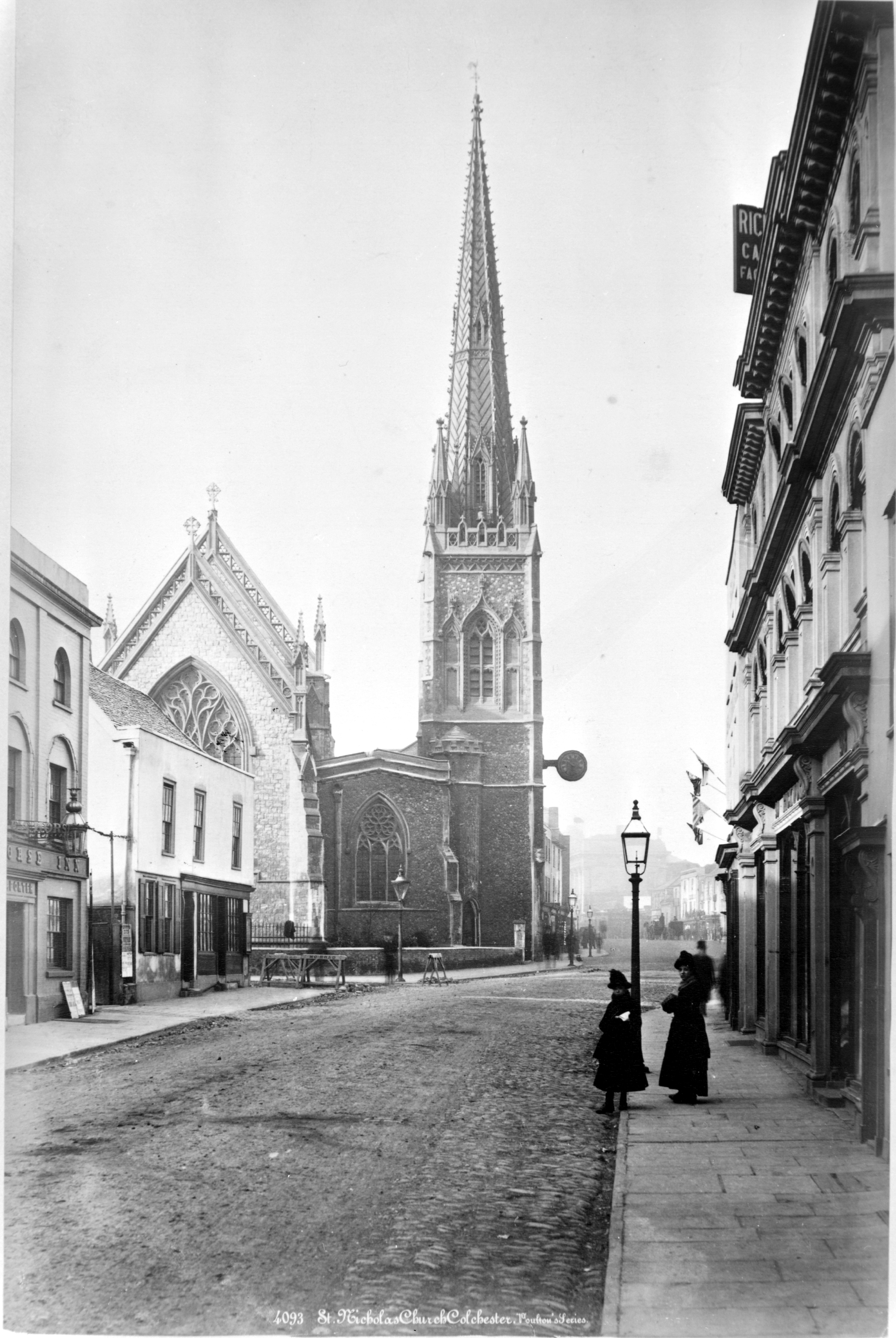
St Nicholas's Church, Colchester, with its magnificent spire, both demolished in 1955

=== St Nicholas ===
Saint Nicholas' church formerly stood on the High Street. The original church was 12th century and the church was rebuilt in the 14th century, and restored again between 1875 and 1876 to designs by Sir George Gilbert Scott. The church had the highest spire in Colchester. The Church of England had the church demolished in 1955 and sold the site for commercial redevelopment. The Colchester Co-operative Society built a department store ("St Nicholas House") on the site. The building has retail at the ground floor and permission for residential development on the upper floors.

=== St Runwald's ===
St Runwald's church is one of only three churches were ever dedicated to the Saint in Britain. The church in Colchester formerly stood as part of "middle row" in the High Street. It was demolished, along with other buildings in the row, in the 1860s. The church graveyard is in West Stockwell Street, behind Colchester Town Hall.

=== St Peter's ===
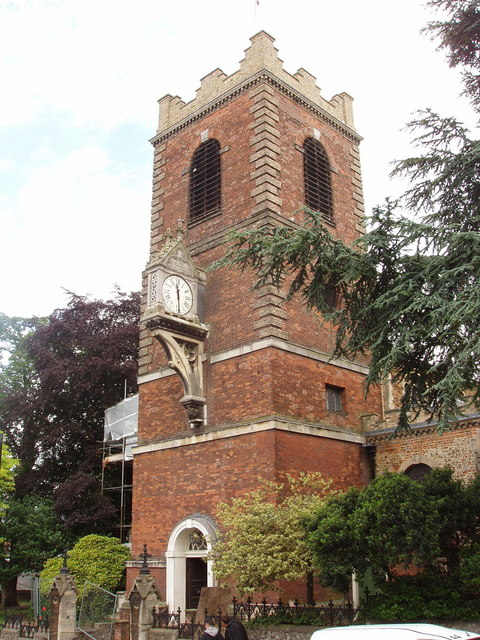
St Peter's on North Hill

In origin a medieval church, St Peter's is on North Hill and largely consists of later Georgian material due to a major remodelling in 1758, but the building retains mediaeval fabric and underwent a further remodelling in 1895–96. During the medieval period the church yard contained a large stone cross from which gospels were read during the Palm Sunday procession. The churchyard also contained a large marker stone on its northern side into the 1500s. The Medieval church also contained a large rood screen with a rood loft. The bells are rung every Thursday. Details of its history are available at the church.

=== St Leonard's-at-the-Hythe ===
St Leonard's-at-the-Hythe is a large medieval church at Colchester's Hythe river port. Along with St John's Abbey it was one of the two ecclesiastical buildings in Colchester which contained clocks. The church was the site of a battle during the 1648 Siege of Colchester, and its south door still contains firing loops for muskets. The church is now redundant, and is cared for by the Churches Conservation Trust.

== Georgian churches ==
=== Baptist Church ===
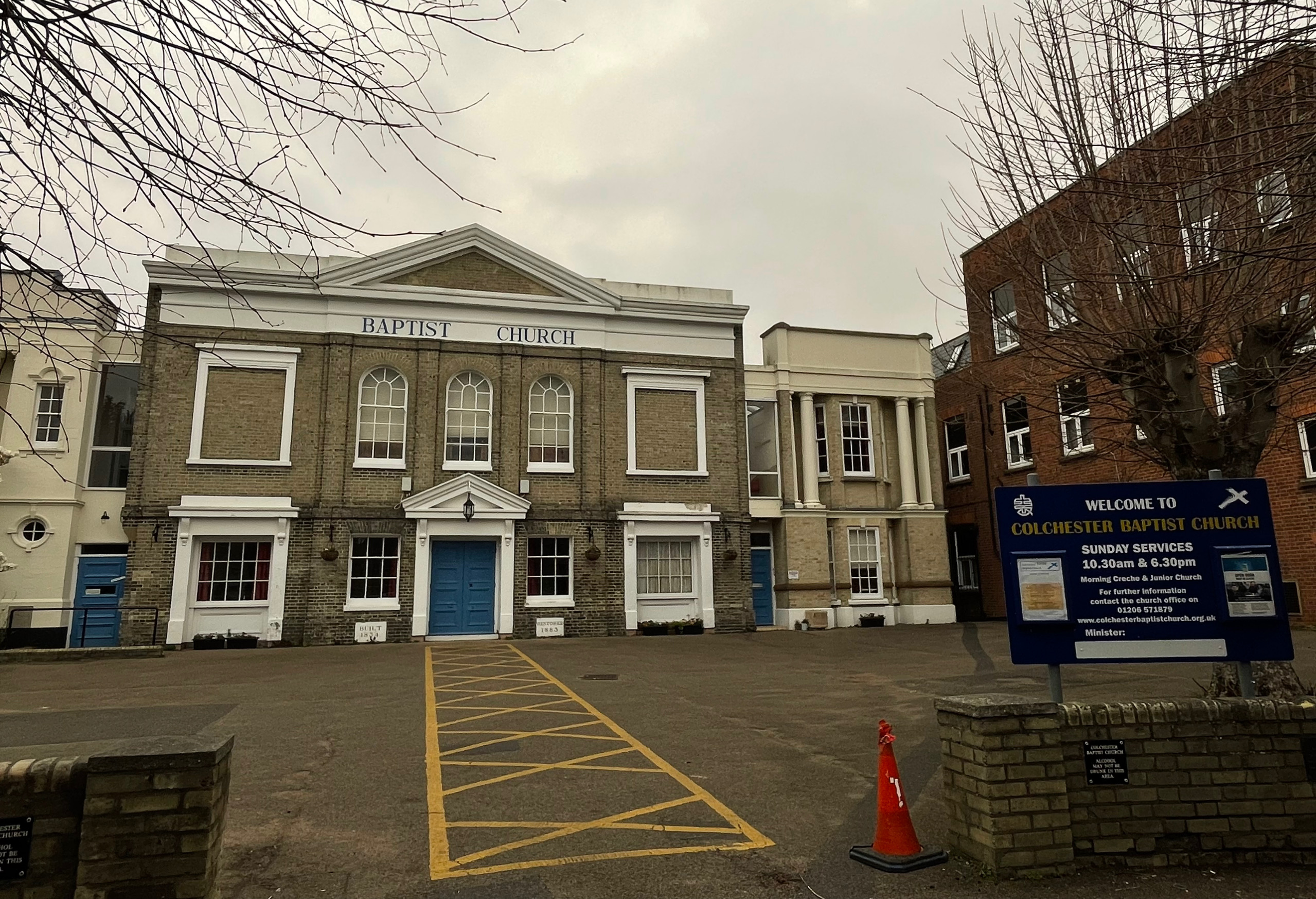
The Baptist Church at Eld Lane

In Eld Lane, built in 1834 on the site of Colchester's first purpose-built Baptist chapel of 1711.

=== Strict Baptist Chapel ===
Formerly in Stanwell Street, demolished in 1971 to make way for Colchester's Inner Ring Road. The chapel was built in 1811 or 1812 for a new congregation, some of whom had seceded from the Baptists in Eld Lane. Colchester Elim Pentecostal Church (see below) used the chapel 1957–1971.

=== Congregational Chapel ===
This red-brick chapel in East Stockwell Street was built in 1816–17. The chapel was built for Congregational minister Rev. Joseph Herrick, who was expelled from his previous meeting house in St Helen's Lane by the Unitarians in the congregation. It was refronted in 1834 with a pediment and Tuscan columns. After Herrick's death, his successor, Rev. Thomas Batty (father of Colchester artist Dora Batty), added new schoolrooms in 1868 and remodelled the chapel in 1875. It has been a Grade II-listed building since 1971.

=== Quaker Meeting House ===
A Grade II listed building in Church Street dating from 1803.

== Victorian churches ==
=== All Saints, Shrub End ===
The parish church of Shrub End; formerly part of Lexden, it became a separate parish in 1845. Designed in a revival of Decorated Gothic by D. R. French, the red-brick church has a tower with a slated spire. MapRef TL 970232. A more detailed look at the church can be found on the church's website on www.shrubendparish.co.uk

=== St Botolph's ===
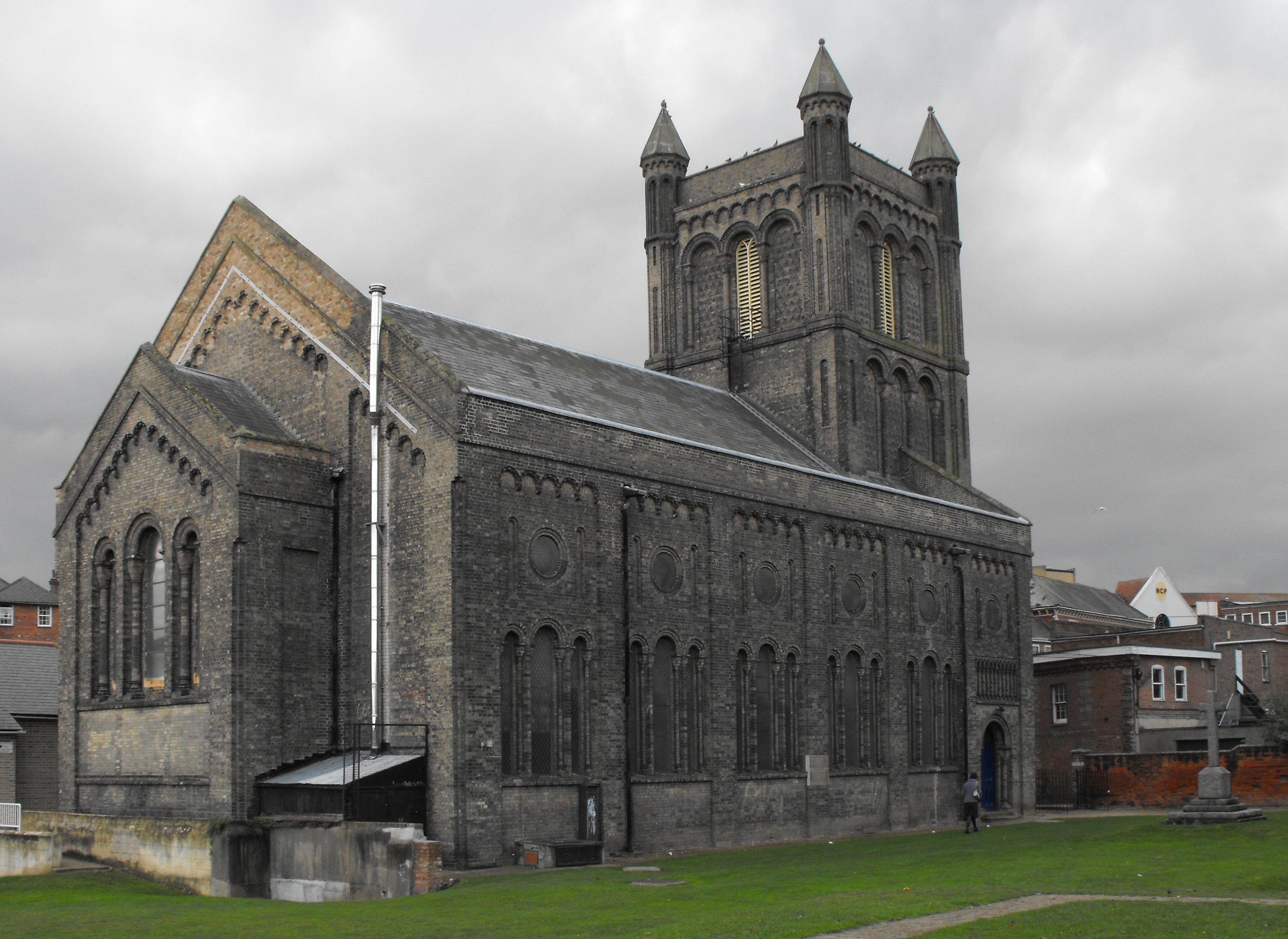
St Botolph's Church

The current church building was dedicated in 1837. It is built in the style of the old Norman building, with semicircular arches and Norman ornamentation and was designed by William Mason of Ipswich. The Church was nearly destroyed by fire in the 1943 air raids. It had its own team of fire watchers which dealt with several incendiary bombs.

=== Garrison Church ===
Built in Military Road in 1855 to hold services for soldiers going to the Crimean War, this large Grade II* listed timber church has space for a congregation of 500. It is now the Romanian Orthodox Church of St. John the Wonderworker.

=== St James the Less ===
This Roman Catholic Church of St James the Less and St Helen in Priory Street was designed by JJ Scoles, built in 1837 and enlarged in 1909–10. It is a Norman revival building with an apsidal chancel.

=== St John the Evangelist ===
The Church of St John the Evangelist Colchester was built in 1863 by Arthur Blomfield in the Decorated style. It is principally of red brick with yellow and blue brick and stone window tracery. It consists of a chancel and nave surmounted by a small bellcot at the west end. The chancel and its fittings and part of the nave were built with money collected in memory of J.T. Round. It has a boarded and tiled roof. In the late 1960s and into the 1970s, the modern housing estate of St John's was built and a further estate of Highwoods was developed in the 1980s. From 1980 under the leadership of Rev Brian Nicholson, the numbers of the congregation steadily grew. Mainly through the generous giving from the church family, the church was significantly extended in 1987. Following continuing growth in church membership, St Luke's was planted, meeting weekly in the community centre on Highwoods. In 2012 the church undertook a million pound plus building project, replacing the old pre-fab church hall with a new multi purpose Community Centre.

=== United Reformed Church ===
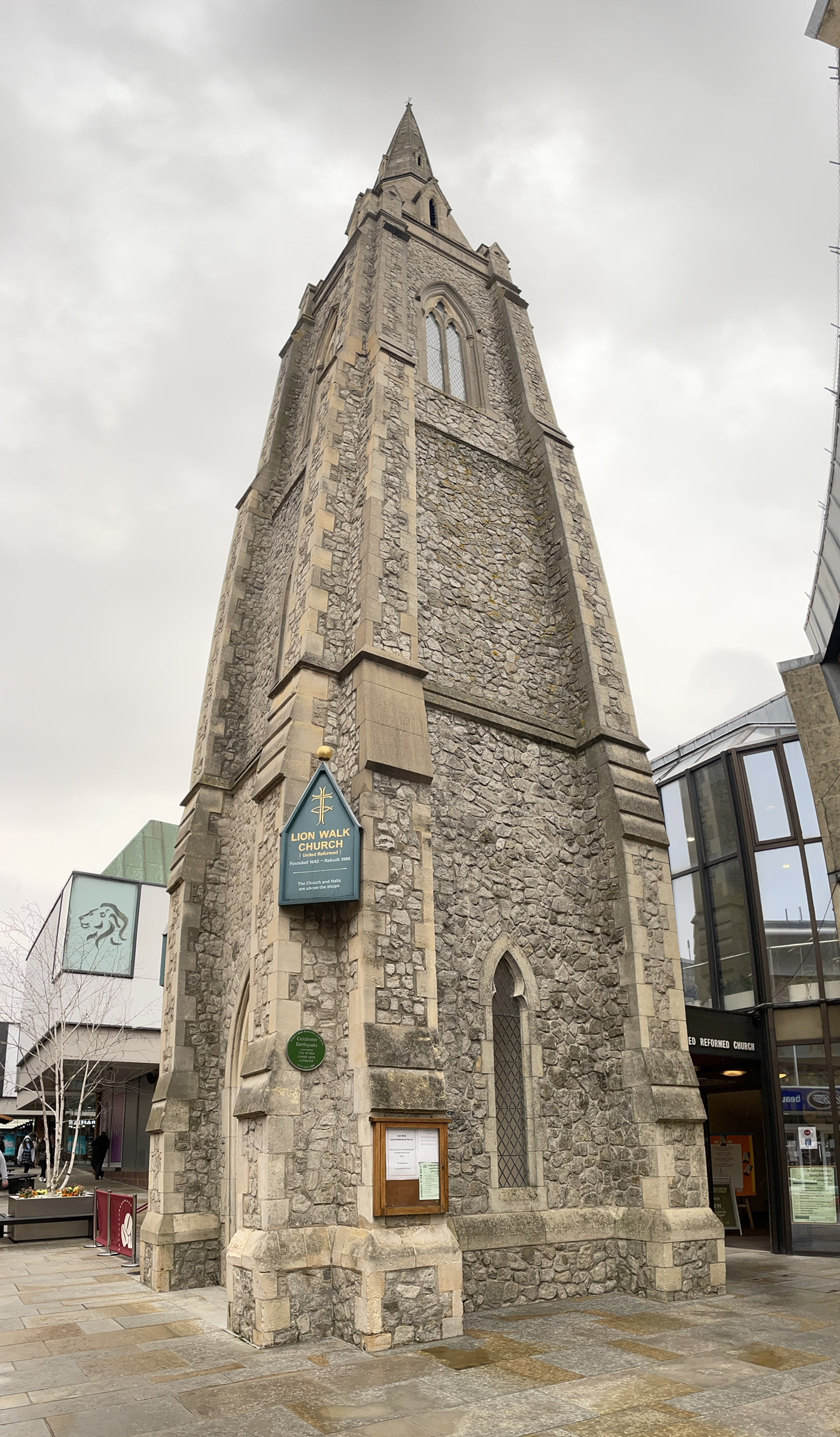
The United Reformed Church, Lion Walk, Colchester (panorama)

In Lion Walk, this Gothic Revival church was designed in a Geometrical Decorated Gothic style and built in 1863 for a Congregational community that had been meeting in Colchester since the 17th century. The 1884 Colchester earthquake damaged its steeple. The church became part of the new United Reformed Church in 1972.

== Modern churches ==
=== St Barnabas' Church, Old Heath ===
Built on the site of a Victorian church, St Barnabas was built in 1949 to replace the original church which was in a state of disrepair. A small and friendly church, it has various services and masses during the week including a Parish Sung Mass on a Sunday Morning at 10am.

=== Castle Methodist Church ===
In Maidenburgh Street next to Colchester Castle, this 20th-century building was opened in 1970 on the site of the "great round meeting house" where John Wesley preached in the 18th century. A wooden pulpit that he used is preserved in the new church.

=== Colchester New Church ===
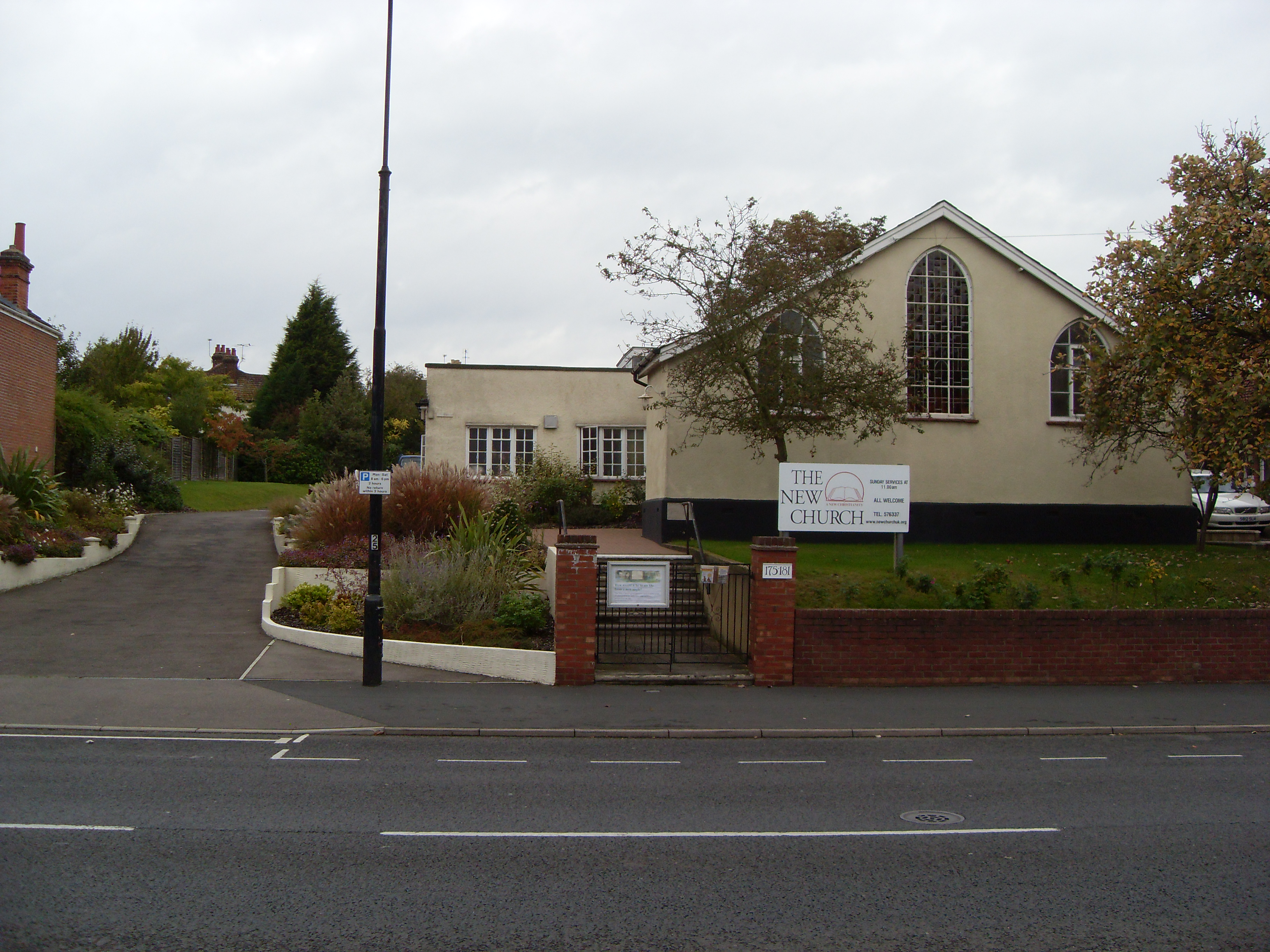
Colchester New Church

Colchester New Church at 175 Maldon Road was built in 1924. In 1967 the church building was expanded. The sanctuary was extended two metres in length, a new school room, and a new entrance porch were added. The designer of the new additions was architect Geoff P. Dawson.

=== Elim Pentecostal Church ===
Colchester's Elim Pentecostal congregation formed in 1930. A temporary tabernacle was built in Fairfax Road in 1931 and served until 1957, when the congregation moved to the former Strict Baptist Chapel in Stanwell Street (see above). When that chapel was demolished in 1971 to make way for a new road, the congregation had a new church built in Walsingham Road. The congregation now meets in a newer building on Clematis Way.

=== Greenstead Evangelical Free Church ===
Greenstead Evangelical Free Church is on Magnolia Drive on the Greenstead estate. It was built in 1963, making it almost as old as the estate itself. It is affiliated with the Fellowship of Independent Evangelical Churches.

== Sources ==
- Pevsner, Nikolaus; Radcliffe, Enid (1965) [1954]. Essex. The Buildings of England. Harmondsworth: Penguin Books. pp. 132–137. ISBN 0-14-071011-6.
