= Messenger of the Court =

In common law, a Messenger of the Court is an officer of the court whose duties include, carrying written or verbal communications and executing orders of the court. In the case of a bankruptcy court, the Messenger's duties include seizing and taking possession of the bankrupt's estate.

In the Plymouth Colony, the Messenger's duties included serving summonses, keeping the jail, and carrying out executions.

== See also ==
- Messenger-at-arms
