= Haverhill station =

Haverhill station or Haverhill railway station may refer to:

- Haverhill station (Massachusetts), a train station in Haverhill, Massachusetts, USA
- Haverhill railway station (England), a former railway station in Haverhill, Suffolk, UK
- Haverhill South railway station, a former railway station in Haverhill, Suffolk, UK
- Haverhill station, a former railroad location in Marion Township, Olmsted County, Minnesota previously named for Chester, Minnesota, but renamed by the railroad to avoid confusion with Rochester, Minnesota, USA.

== See also ==
- Haverhill (disambiguation)
