= Haverhill =

Haverhill is the name of different places around the world:

== United Kingdom ==
- Haverhill, Suffolk, England

== United States ==
- Haverhill, Florida, city in Florida, United States.
- Haverhill, Iowa, city in Iowa, United States.
- Haverhill, Kansas, city in Kansas, United States.
- Haverhill, Massachusetts, city in Massachusetts, United States.
  - Haverhill station (Massachusetts), railroad station served by Amtrak and the MBTA.
    - Haverhill Line, MBTA commuter rail system
- Haverhill, New Hampshire, town in New Hampshire, United States.
- Haverhill, Ohio, city in Ohio, United States
- Haverhill Township, Olmsted County, Minnesota
- Haverhill station, a railroad location in Marion Township, Olmsted County, Minnesota previously named for Chester, Minnesota, but renamed by the railroad to avoid confusion with Rochester, Minnesota.

== Other uses ==
- Haverhill station (disambiguation), stations of the name
