= Paternoster (sculpture) =

Sculpture by Elisabeth Frink

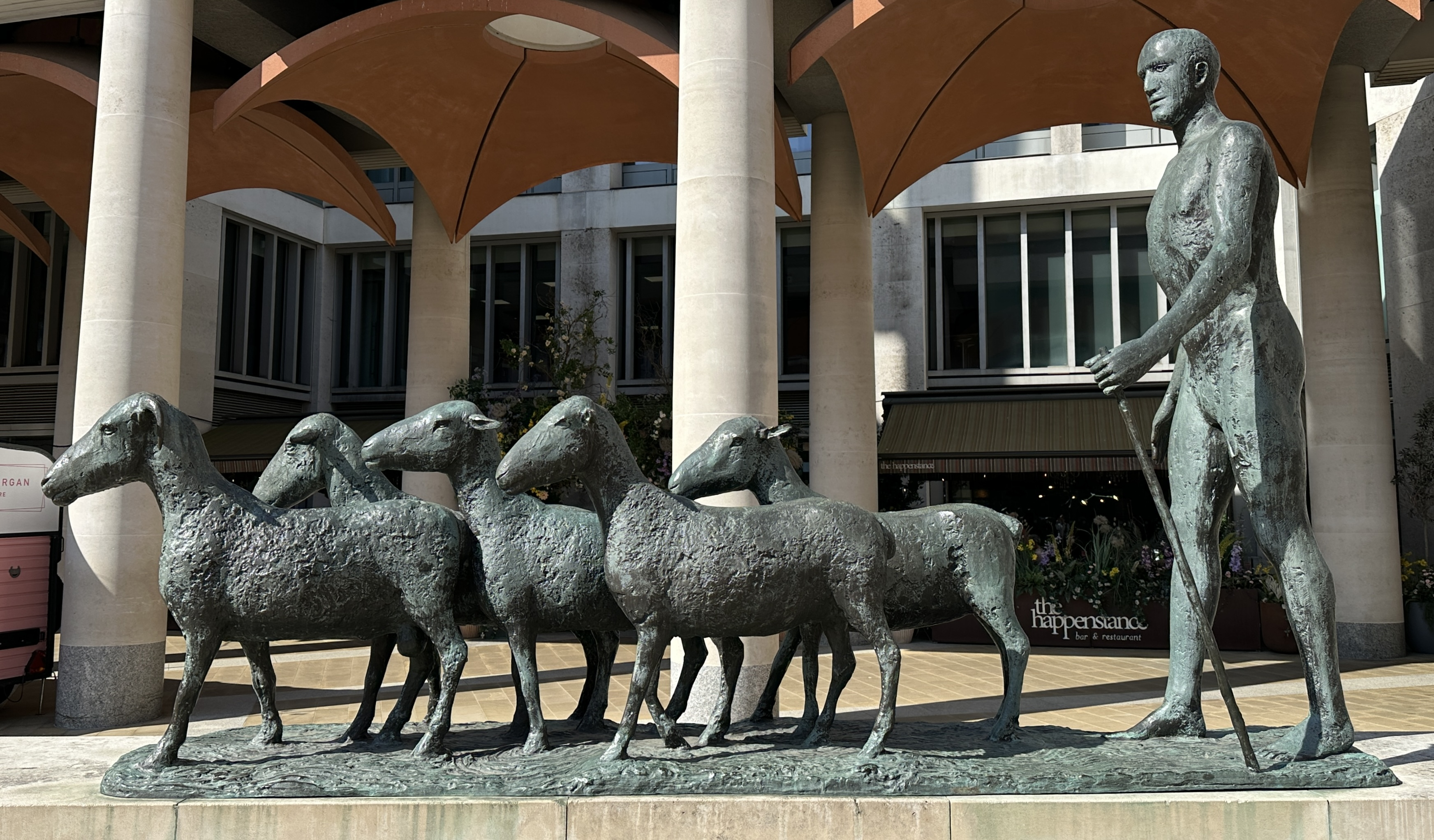
- The sculpture in 2026
- Artist: Elisabeth Frink
- Year: 1975; 51 years ago
- Type: Sculpture
- Medium: Bronze
- Location: London, EC4 United Kingdom; 51.514647°N 0.098892°W

Paternoster (FCR 243), also known as Shepherd and Sheep or Shepherd with his Flock, is an outdoor bronze sculpture of 1975 by Elisabeth Frink, installed in Paternoster Square near St Paul's Cathedral in London, United Kingdom.

The sculptural group measures 84 by 129 by 32 inches (213 cm × 328 cm × 81 cm). It shows an androgynous shepherd herding five sheep. The subject of the artwork reflects the former use of Paternoster Row as the site of Newgate Market for the sale of livestock and meat, and may also have theological overtones of the Good Shepherd, reflecting its position in the shadow of St Paul's Cathedral. It may draw inspiration from husbandry in the Cévennes region of France, where Frink spent time at the vineyard of her second husband Edward Pool in the late 1960s to early 1970s, or from Picasso's 1944 sculpture Man with Sheep, and may also play on the religious and linguistic similarity between the Latin paternoster ("our father") and pastor (shepherd).

The work was commissioned by Trafalgar House for the north side of its 1960s development at Paternoster Square. It was unveiled in July 1975 by Yehudi Menuhin, who described it as "the antithesis of the buildings surrounding us". Around the same time, Trafalgar House also commissioned Frink's Horse and Rider statue, unveiled at Dover Street on Piccadilly in 1975.

It was removed in 1997 to a temporary location on London Wall near the Museum of London while the site was redeveloped, and was reinstalled in 2003 on a new Portland stone plinth after the redevelopment was completed.

A series of eight smaller versions was created in the 1980s. One example was installed at All Saints' Church in Great Thurlow in Suffolk, in memory of Ronald Vestey, a scion of the Vestey Brothers butchery empire; he was the son of Sir Edmund Vestey, 1st Baronet, and the father of Edmund Hoyle Vestey. Frink was born nearby, in Great Thurlow.

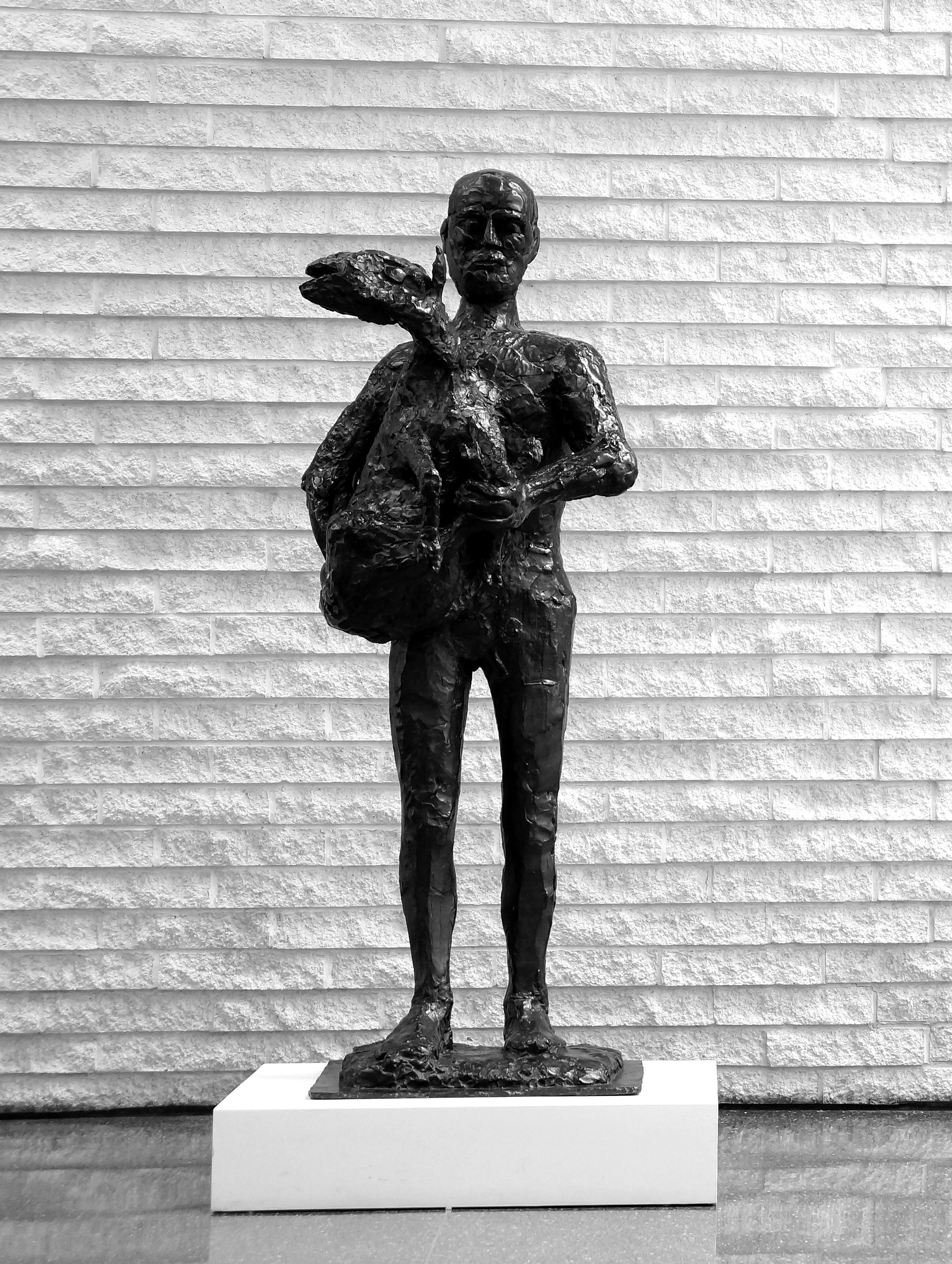
Cast of Picasso's 1944 sculpture Man with Sheep, Philadelphia Museum of Art

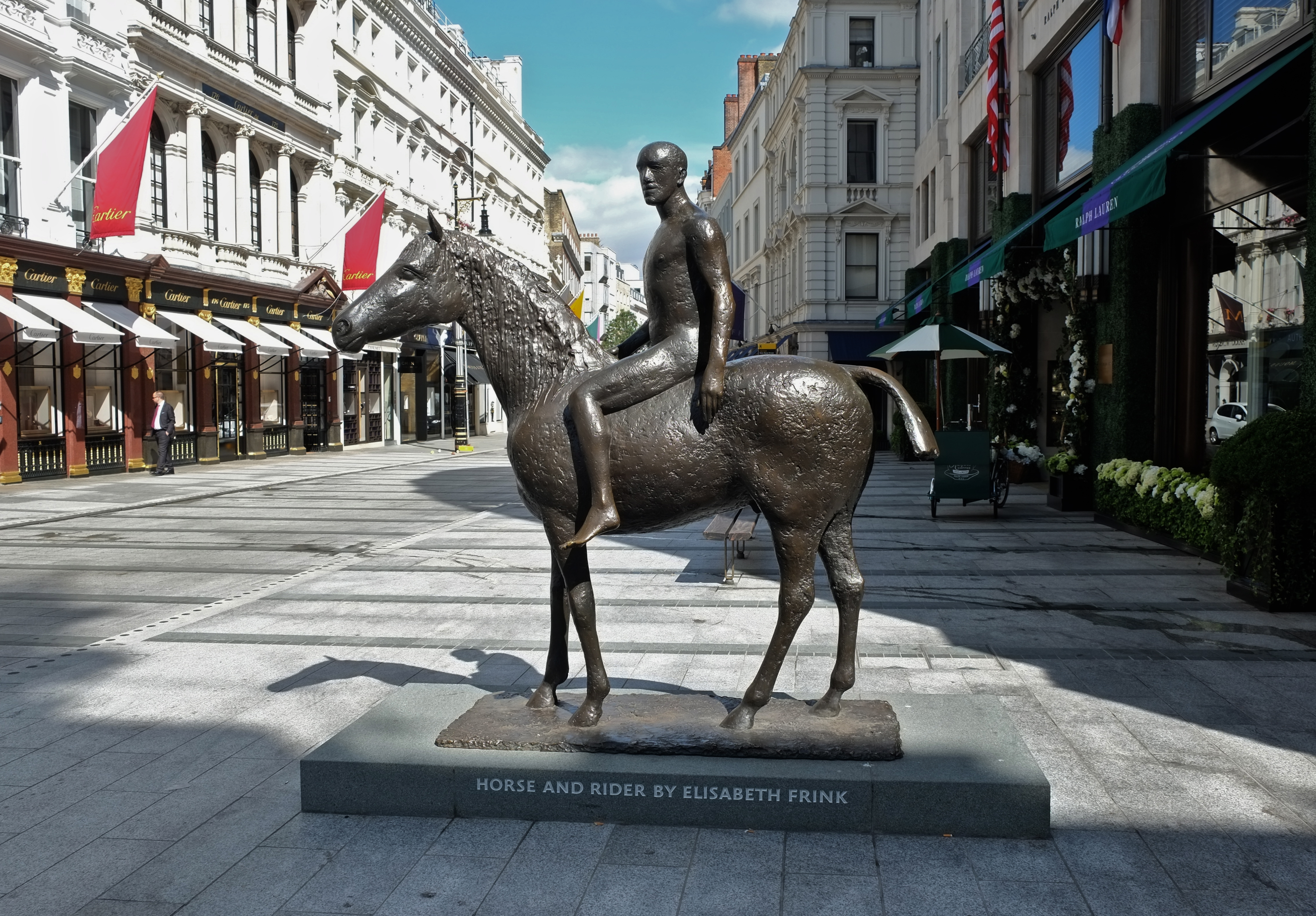
Frink's 1974 sculpture Horse and Rider, in Mayfair

== See also ==
- 1975 in art
