= Haverhill Arts Centre =

Municipal building in Haverhill, Suffolk, England

Coordinates: 52.0807°N 0.4406°E

Haverhill Arts Centre, formerly Haverhill Town Hall, is a former municipal building in the High Street in Haverhill, Suffolk, a town in England. The building, which is currently used as an events centre, is a Grade II listed building.

== History ==
The building was commissioned by Daniel and Caroline Gurteen, who were the proprietors of a textile manufacturing business at Chauntry Mills in Haverhill, as part of celebrations for their 50th wedding anniversary. The site they selected was on the southwest side of the High Street, close to Haverhill South railway station. The foundation stone for the new building was laid on 11 April 1882. It was designed by Edward Sharman of Wellingborough in the Gothic Revival style, built in red brick with stone dressings at a cost of £5,000 and was officially opened as Haverhill Town Hall on 2 August 1883.

The building had a large hall on the first floor, while the ground floor accommodated a kitchen, toilets, and rooms for lectures, committee meetings, chess and billiards. It also included a council chamber and the town's public library. In May 1884, a large organ, designed and manufactured by James Jepson Binns, was installed in the hall. The hall was known for its public dances in the 1950s and 1960s, and for bingo and an annual pantomime in the 1970s and 1980s. In the early 1990s, it was owned by the St Edmundsbury Borough Council, which converted it into an arts centre and re-opened it as such on 1 December 1994.

In 2004, control of the building passed to Haverhill Town Council. In 2023, the arts centre initiated a self-produced pantomime for the first time: the production of Dick Whittington was written and directed by the centre's creative director, Dan Schumann, and starred the actor, Scott Wright. The building also houses the Haverhill Local History Museum, which has a collection of local memorabilia.

== Architecture ==
The building is constructed of red brick, with dressing of stone and glazed tile. It has two storeys and an attic, with a slate roof. Its main front is three bays wide, and has a projecting three-stage porch rising the full height of the building and surmounted by a gable. There is an arched opening with a hood mould in the first stage, an oriel window in the second stage and a tri-partite arched window with cusped heads and tracery in the third stage. The outer bays are fenestrated by pairs of windows with cusped heads. The side walls each have seven windows. As built, there were also dormer windows, later removed. The building was grade II listed in 1973.
