= Elisabeth Frink =

English sculptor and printmaker

Dame Elisabeth Frink CH DBE RA
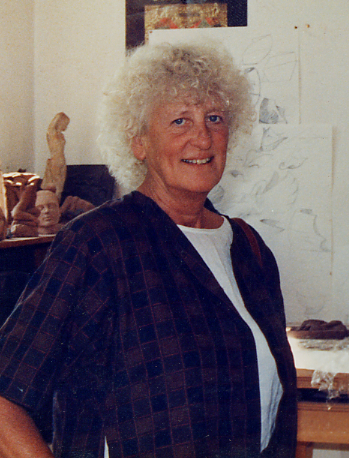
- Born: Elisabeth Jean Frink; 14 November 1930; Great Thurlow, Suffolk, England
- Died: 18 April 1993 (aged 62); Blandford Forum, Dorset, England
- Education: Guildford School of Art; Chelsea School of Art
- Known for: Sculpture

Dame Elisabeth Jean Frink CH DBE RA (14 November 1930 – 18 April 1993) was an English sculptor and printmaker. Her Times obituary noted the three essential themes in her work as "the nature of Man; the 'horseness' of horses; and the divine in human form".

== Early life ==
Elisabeth Frink was born in November 1930 at her paternal grandparents' home The Grange in Great Thurlow, a village and civil parish in the St Edmundsbury district of Suffolk, England. Her parents were Ralph Cuyler Frink and Jean Elisabeth (née Conway-Gordon). Captain Ralph Cuyler Frink, was a career officer in the 4th/7th Royal Dragoon Guards and among the men of the cavalry regiment evacuated from Dunkirk in the early summer of 1940. She was raised in a Catholic household.

The Second World War, which broke out shortly before Frink's ninth birthday, provided context for some of her earliest artistic works. Growing up near a military airfield in Suffolk, she heard bombers returning from their missions and on one occasion was forced to hide under a hedge to avoid the machine gun attack of a German fighter plane. Her early drawings, from the period before she attended arts school in London, have a powerful apocalyptic flavour: themes include wounded birds and falling men. During the course of the war Frink was evacuated with her mother and brother Tim to Exmouth, Devon where she attended Southlands Church of England School. When Southlands School was commandeered for the war effort in 1943 Frink became a full-time pupil at The Convent of the Holy Family School.

== Career ==
Frink studied at the Guildford School of Art (now the University for the Creative Arts) (1946–1949), under Willi Soukop, and at the Chelsea School of Art (1949–1953). She was part of a postwar group of British sculptors, dubbed the Geometry of Fear school, that included Reg Butler, Bernard Meadows, Kenneth Armitage and Eduardo Paolozzi. Frink's subject matter included men, birds, dogs, horses and religious motifs, but very seldom any female forms. Bird (1952; London, Tate), one of a number of bird sculptures, and her first successful pieces (also Three Heads and the Figurative Tradition) with its alert, menacing stance, characterizes her early work. She created a bookrest in the form of an eagle, for the lectern of the new Coventry Cathedral, as well as a canopy for its Bishop's throne.

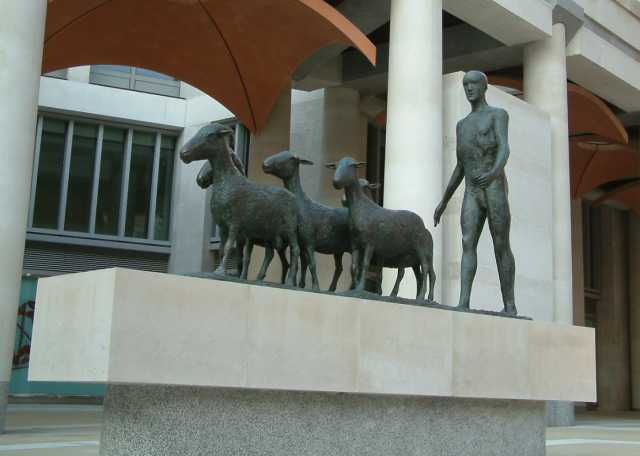
Paternoster, Paternoster Square, London

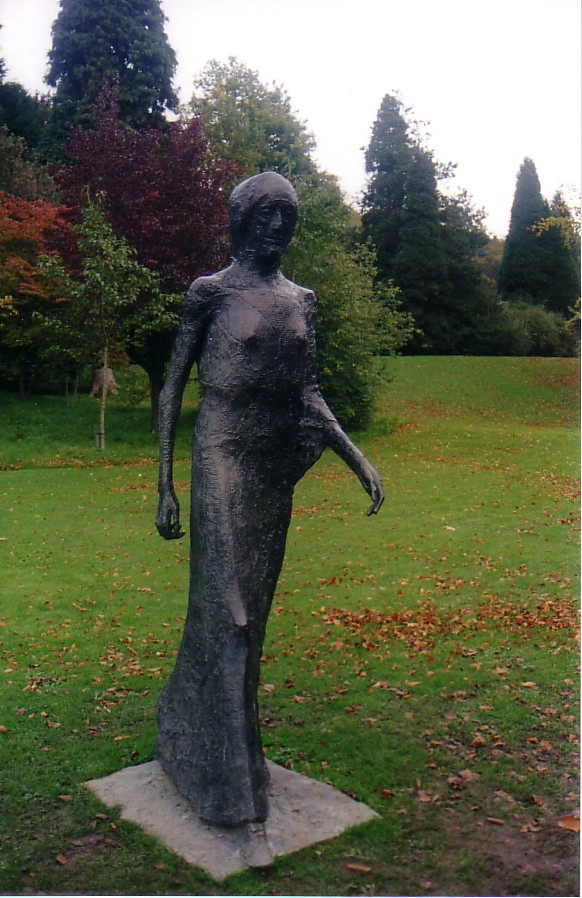
Walking Madonna, Chatsworth House, Derbyshire

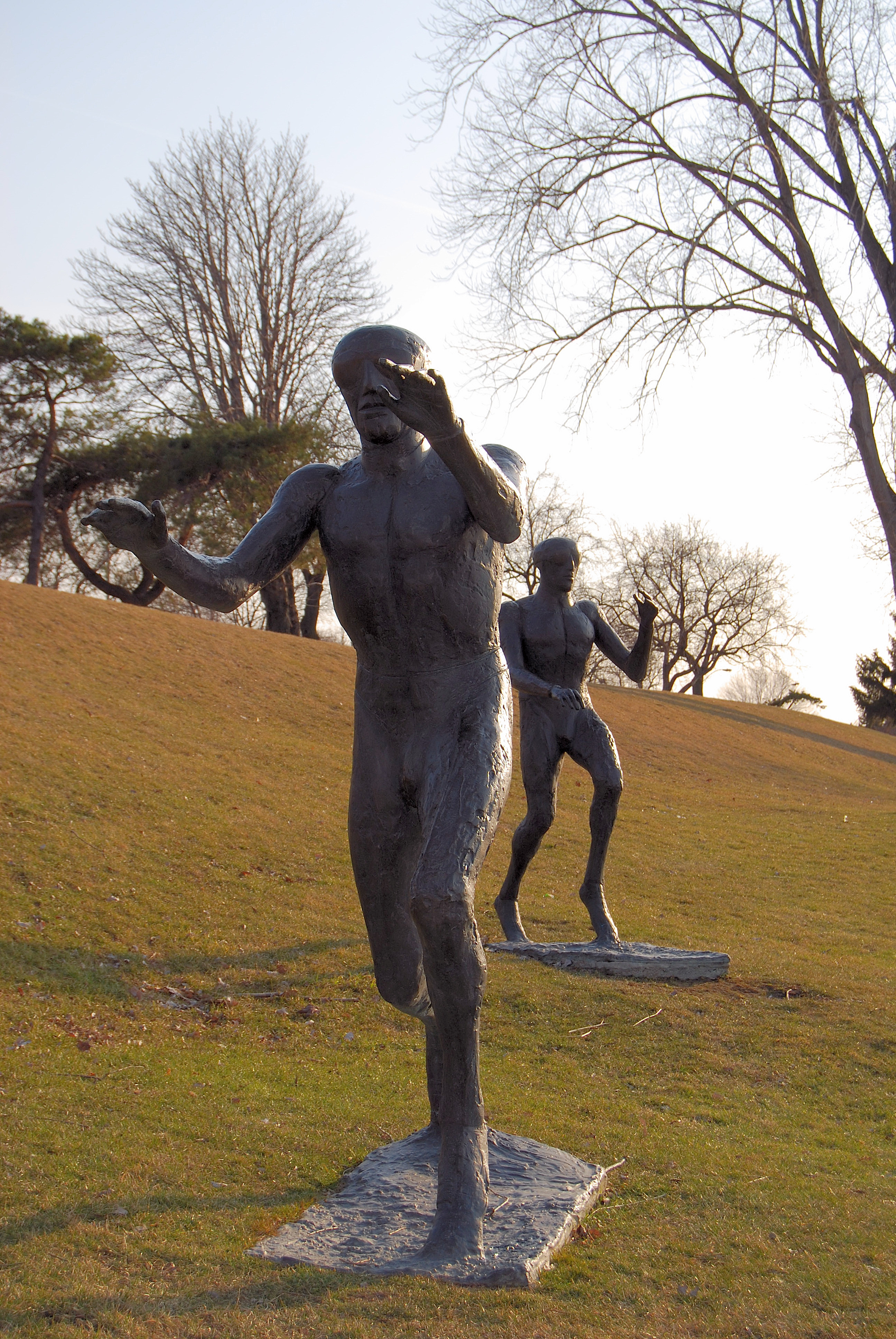
Flying Men, Odette Sculpture Park Windsor Canada

Although she made many drawings and prints, she is best known for her bronze outdoor sculpture, which has a distinctive cut and worked surface. This is created by her adding plaster to an armature, which she then worked back into with a chisel and surform. This process contradicts the very essence of "modelling form" established in the modelling tradition and defined by Rodin's handling of clay.

In the 1960s Frink's continuing fascination with the human form was evident in a series of falling figures and winged men. While living in France from 1967 to 1970, she began a series of threatening, monumental male heads, known as the Goggled Heads. In 1976, she set up her home in Dorset in South West England. On returning to England, she focused on the male nude, barrel-chested, with mask-like features, attenuated limbs and a pitted surface, for example Running Man (1976; Pittsburgh, Carnegie Museum of Art). Frink's sculpture, and her lithographs and etchings created as book illustrations, drew on archetypes expressing masculine strength, struggle and aggression. In 1984 she explained that she "focused on the male because to me he is a subtle combination of sensuality and strength with vulnerability".

The 1980s included capstones for Frink's career. In 1982, a new publishing firm proposed to produce a catalogue raisonné of all of her works to date; and the Royal Academy planned a retrospective of her life's work. The date of the retrospective, originally to be held in 1986, was moved forward a year due to space demands at the gallery, causing Frink some headaches due to her busy commissioned work schedule. In 1985 alone, she was committed to two major projects: a set of three figures for a corporate headquarters, one of which was a nearly 7-foot-tall (2.1 m) male nude; and the other, a grouping entitled Dorset Martyrs for Dorchester, Dorset.

However, despite the potential for conflict, the retrospective was a success and spurred the art world to hold more exhibitions of Frink's work, with four solo exhibitions and several group exhibitions scheduled for the following year. Tirelessly, Frink continued to accept commissions and sculpt, as well as serve on advisory committees, meet art students who had expressed an interest in her work, and pursue other public commitments.

Having been elected a full Academician at the Royal Academy in 1979, there were moves to make the 54-year-old sculptor the first female president of the academy, Frink however declined the post and it went instead to Roger de Grey.

Frink kept up this hectic pace of sculpting and exhibiting until early 1991, when an operation for cancer of the oesophagus caused an enforced break. However, short weeks later Frink was again creating sculptures and preparing for solo exhibitions. In September, she underwent further surgery. Again, Frink did not let this hold her back, proceeding with a planned trip for exhibitions to New Orleans, Louisiana, and New York City. The exhibitions were a success, but Frink's health was clearly deteriorating. Despite this, she was working on a colossal statue, Risen Christ, for Liverpool Cathedral. This sculpture would prove to be her last; just one week after its installation, Frink died from cancer on 18 April 1993, aged 62, in Blandford Forum, Dorset. Stephen Gardiner, Frink's official biographer, argued that this final sculpture was appropriate: "This awesome work, beautiful, clear and commanding, a vivid mirror-image of the artist's mind and spirit, created against fearful odds, was a perfect memorial for a remarkable great individual."

== Exhibitions ==
Frink's first solo exhibition was held at St George's Gallery, London in 1955. In 1958 she joined the Waddington Galleries, London. Between 1959 and 1972 Frink exhibited with regularity (usually one show every year) at the Waddington Galleries. In the 1960s she was also represented by the Bertha Schaefer Gallery in New York City. 1971 saw Frink first exhibit in the Royal Academy, London as part of the Summer Exhibition. In the same year, Frink was elected an Associate of the Royal Academy. In 1974, Frink began exhibiting with Beaux Arts (Patricia and Reg Singh). Terry Dintenfass became Elisabeth Frink’s American gallerist starting in 1979 and the two women forged a lasting friendship. The Dintenfass Gallery had comprehensive one person shows in 1979, 1983, and 1991. In 1985, a retrospective of Frink's work was held at the Royal Academy of Art, London.

In 1990, the National Museum of Women in the Arts displayed Elisabeth Frink: Sculpture and Drawings, 1950-1990, a retrospective of her work. The exhibit was accompanied by catalog written by Bryan Robertson (ISBN 978-0-940-97913-0).

== Personal life ==
Frink married Michel Jammet in 1955: their son was born in 1958 and the marriage was dissolved in 1963. Between 1964 and 1974 she was married to Edward Pool. Hungarian born Alexander Csaky, whom she married as her third husband in 1974, predeceased her by only a few months. Dame Elisabeth died of cancer on 18 April 1993, aged 62.

== Highlights ==
Warhorse and Walking Madonna may be seen in the garden at Chatsworth House. Other work is at the Jerwood Sculpture Park at Ragley Hall. Uniquely in England, Desert Quartet (1990), Frink's penultimate sculpture, was listed at Grade II* in 2007, less than 30 years from its creation by the Department for Culture, Media and Sport. It may be seen opposite Liverpool Gardens in Worthing. Her 1975 bust of John Pope-Hennessy is in the collection of the British Museum.

== Frink School of Figurative Sculpture ==
Before Frink died in 1993, she had given master classes at the Sir Henry Doulton School of Sculpture then headed by sculptor Colin Melbourne ARA in Stoke-on-Trent, England. Rosemary Barnett took over as principal of the Sir Henry Doulton School of Sculpture, Stoke-on-Trent, briefly before its closure. In 1990 she met Harry Everington there and their shared artistic outlook brought about the Frink School of Figurative Sculpture which opened in 1996 in Longton and closed in 2005 at Tunstall.

Permission from the Frink Estate was given to name a new school after her, because it was to continue the tradition which she represented. The Frink School of Figurative Sculpture opened in 1996, with an emphasis on sculptural form; it attempted to give some balance to the declining figurative training and increased conceptualism in sculpture schools in the UK.

== Studio reconstruction ==
In 2019, Frink's studio at Woolland in Dorset was reconstructed in a historic tithe barn at Place Farm in Tisbury, Wiltshire by the art gallery Messums Wiltshire for their 2020 exhibition A Place Apart. A collection of original plasters were exhibited in the studio alongside tools and objects salvaged from the original studio.

== Cultural reference ==
Frink was one of five 'Women of Achievement' selected for a set of British stamps issued in August 1996. The others were Dorothy Hodgkin (scientist), Margot Fonteyn (ballerina / choreographer), Marea Hartman (sports administrator) and Daphne Du Maurier (writer). Works by Frink are held in the collections of the Jerwood Gallery, National Galleries of Scotland, The Ingram Collection of Modern British Art, The Priseman Seabrook Collection and the Victoria and Albert Museum.

Frink was chosen as the subject of the British Art Medal Society medal in 1992. The medal by Avril Vaughan was featured in the Society's journal, The Medal, no 23 (1993). The medal was cast by the Royal Mint in an edition of 47 medals.

Frink's sculptures were featured in the 1963 science fiction film The Damned, directed by Joseph Losey. Frink not only lent these but also was on location for their shooting and coached actor Viveca Lindfors on performing the sculptor's method of building up plaster, which was then ferociously worked and carved. Frink's work also appeared in Losey's next film, The Servant.

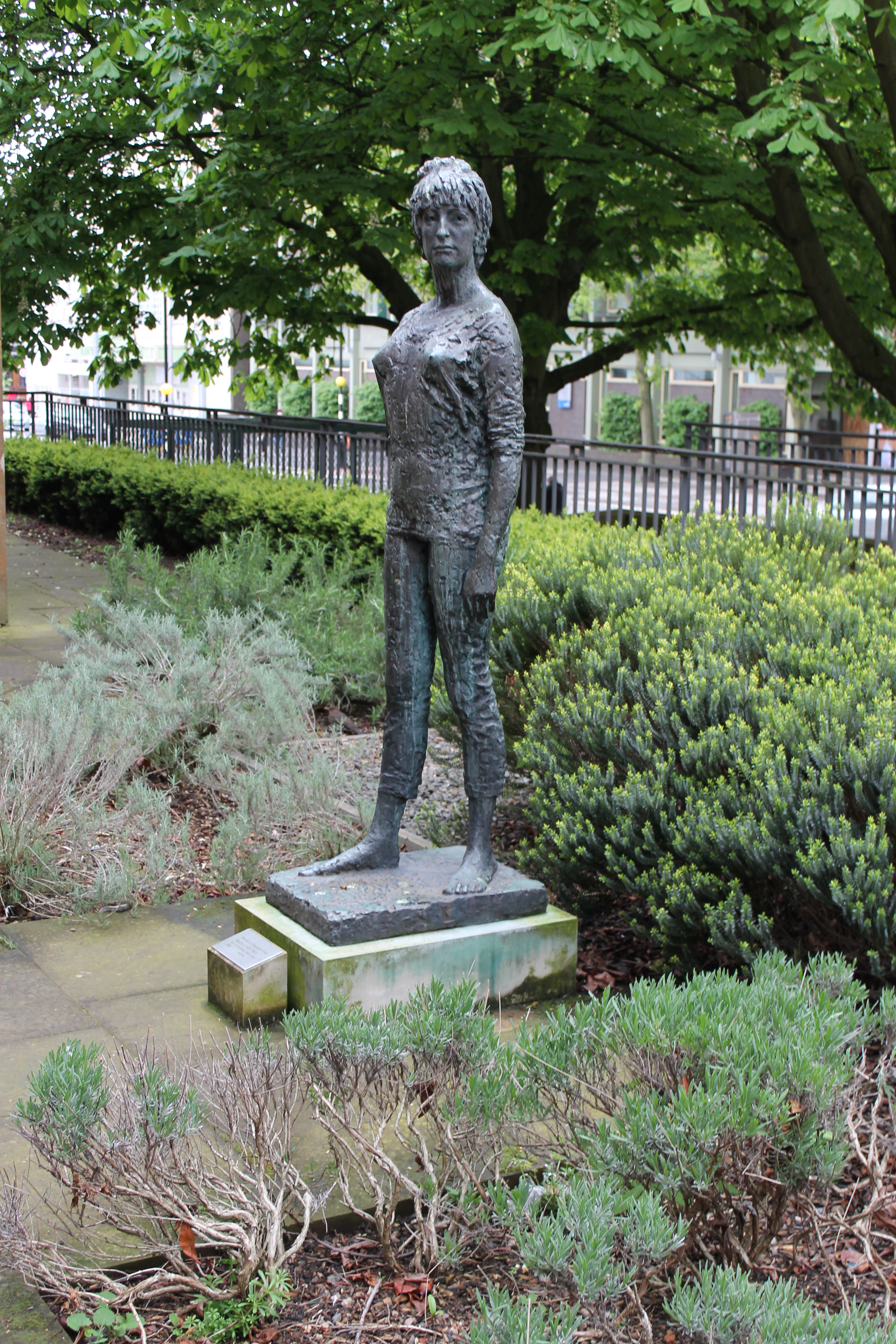
Statue of Frink by F. E. McWilliam, Coventry

A 1956 bronze statue of Frink, by F. E. McWilliam, stands outside the Herbert Art Gallery and Museum in Coventry.

== See also ==
- Bust of Sir Georg Solti, Chicago

== Biography and sources ==
- Stephen Gardiner, 1998, Elisabeth Frink: The Official Biography. HarperCollins Publishers. ISBN 0-00-255606-5
- Elisabeth Frink: catalogue raisonné. Sculpture to 1984. Foreword by Peter Shaffer. Introduction and Dialogue by Bryan Robertson. Published by Harpvale Books. ISBN 0-946425-05-1
- Edward Lucie-Smith. Elisabeth Frink: catalogue raisonné. Sculpture since 1984 & Drawings. Published by Art Books International. ISBN 1-874044-04-X
- Caroline Wiseman. Elisabeth Frink: original prints catalogue raisonné. Published by Art Books International. ISBN 1-874044-25-2
- Art is Why I Get Up in the Morning: Unseen and Rare Pieces by Elisabeth Frink and work by four contemporary British artists who continue today in the figurative expressionist tradition. Published by Mumford Fine Art
