= Trundley and Wadgell's Wood, Great Thurlow =

Protected area in Suffolk, England

Coordinates: 52.13°N 0.47°E

- Site of Special Scientific Interest
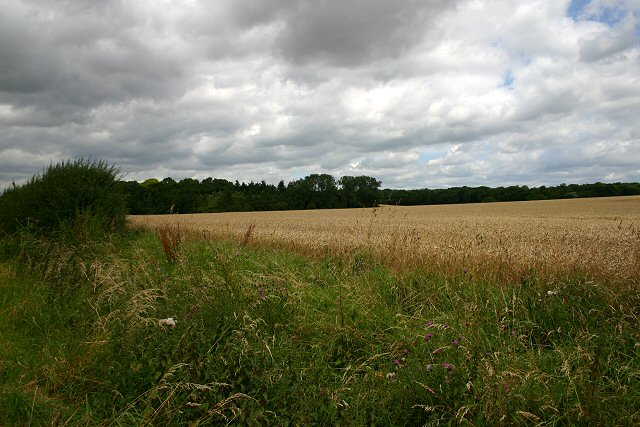
- View of Trundley Wood
- Location of Trundley and Wadgell's Wood, Great Thurlow.
- Area of search: Suffolk
- Grid reference: TL 695 503
- Interest: Biological
- Area: 79.4 hectares
- Notification date: 1986
- Location map: Magic Map

Trundley and Wadgell's Wood, Great Thurlow is a 79.4-hectare (196-acre) biological Site of Special Scientific Interest east of Great Thurlow in Suffolk.

These semi-natural woods on boulder clay soils are mostly ancient coppice with standards, with pedunculate oak as the main standard trees. They have ground flora typical of ancient woodland such as early purple orchid, yellow archangel and sanicle. There are wide grassy rides which are dominated by Yorkshire fog.

The woods are private land with no public access.
