= Harry Everington =

British sculptor

Harry Everington (21 February 1929 – 2000) was a British sculptor, the co-founder of the former Frink School of Figurative Sculpture based in the towns of Stoke-on-Trent (latterly Tunstall), Staffordshire.

== Life ==
Everington was born on 21 February 1929 near Keighley in Yorkshire. He attended Roundhay School and then studied at Leeds College of Art and the Slade in London. Following National Service in the Royal Air Force he became a lecturer at Shrewsbury College of Art. In the mid-1960s he moved to Swansea College of Art, where he became head of the fine art and architecture departure. In the early 1970s he became Principal of Dyfed College of Art.

Following his resigning from Dyfed College he moved to the Stoke-on-Trent, where he concentrated on his own sculptures, working in limestone, wood, clay and steel. At the age of 60 he enrolled as a student at the Sir Henry Doulton School of Art. In the late 1980s Harry established the sculpture studio "Woodstringthistlefoss" at Longnor in the Staffordshire Moorlands. Following the closure of the Sir Henry Doulton School of Art in 1993, Everington, and Rosemary Barnett, the former head of the Doulton School, set up the Frink School (named after Dame Elisabeth Frink). It opened in 1996.

Simon Everington, a British sculptor living in Japan, is his youngest son.

== Public works ==
- The work Under Sail is in the central courtyard of the Maternity/Paediatric Building of St Richard's Hospital, Chichester, West Sussex.
- A sculpture of Saint Bertram in the church in Longnor, Staffordshire Moorlands.
- The Jerwood Foundation purchased Everington's bronze The Crusader for the Jerwood Sculpture Park, Ragley Hall in 2000, where it was installed a few days before his death. Everington described the work, conceived in 1992, as representing "the ancient idealist charging his winded horse into the brick wall of contemporary life". It remained at Ragley until 2012, when the foundation sold it at auction through Sotheby's.
