= Castle Manor Academy =

Location
- Eastern Avenue; Haverhill, Suffolk, CB9 9JE; England; 52°05′08″N 0°25′41″E

Information
- Type: Academy
- Local authority: Suffolk
- Department for Education URN: 138162 Tables
- Ofsted: Reports
- Head of School: Vanessa Witcombe
- Gender: Coeducational
- Age: 11 to 16
- Enrolment: 600
- Houses: Hamlet, Wilsey, Chauntry, Helions, Cleves
- Website: https://castlemanor.org.uk/

Castle Manor Academy (formerly Castle Manor Business and Enterprise College) is a secondary phase converter academy school in Haverhill, Suffolk.

In 2019, the academy received an Ofsted inspection rating of 'good'.

== Academy ==
In November 2017, the school joined the Samuel Ward Academy Trust. The move means that Castle Manor Academy, Burton End Primary Academy and Place Farm Primary Academy will become part of the Trust (Also known as SWAT).
