= Collis Mill, Great Thurlow =

Smock mill in Suffolk, England

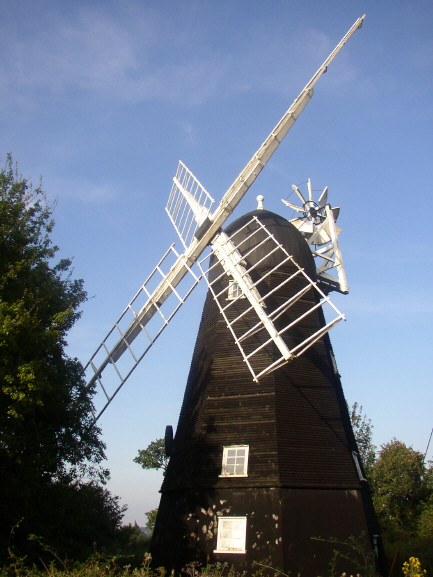
- Collis Mill, September 2005

Origin
- Mill name: Collis Mill
- Mill location: TL 671 500
- Coordinates: 52°07′N 0°26′E
- Operator(s): Private
- Year built: 1807

Information
- Purpose: Corn mill
- Type: Smock mill
- Storeys: Three storey smock
- Base storeys: One storey
- Smock sides: Eight sides
- No. of sails: Four Sails
- Type of sails: Common sails
- Winding: Fantail
- Fantail blades: Eight blades
- Auxiliary power: Portable steam engine
- No. of pairs of millstones: Two pairs

Collis Mill is a Grade II* listed smock mill at Great Thurlow, Suffolk, England, which has been restored.

== History ==
Collis Mill was originally built at Slough, Berkshire. It was moved to Great Thurlow in 1807 replacing an earlier post mill. Thomas Hunt, the Soham millwright, carried out repairs to the mill in 1914. It ceased working by wind in 1915 and the sails were removed from 1920. The mill was worked by a portable steam engine until 1937. The derelict mill was capless in 1959 when it was purchased by R A Vestey for restoration as a visual amenity. Restoration was completed in 1962.

== Description ==
Collis Mill is a three-storey smock mill on a single storey brick base. It has four Common sails and the pepperpot cap is winded by a fantail. It has two pairs of underdrift millstones.

== Millers ==
- Thomas Gardner 1841-44
- Joseph Dearsley 1845-50
- Elijah Dearsley 1850-75
- Archibald Robinson 1875-
- Gabriel Savage
- Joseph Collis -1937

Reference for above:-
