= Rita Phillips =

British sculptor and artist

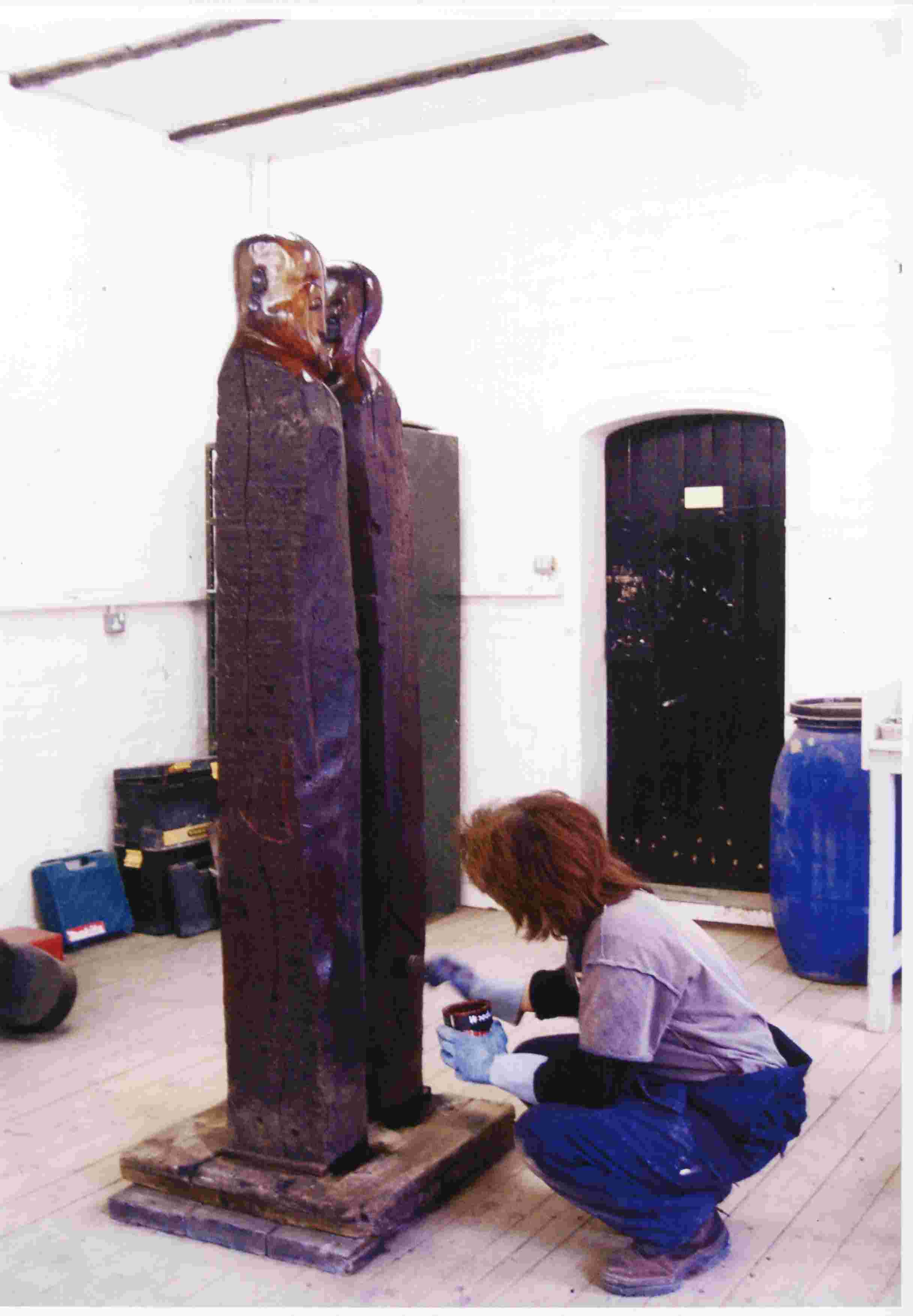
Rita Phillips at The Frink School

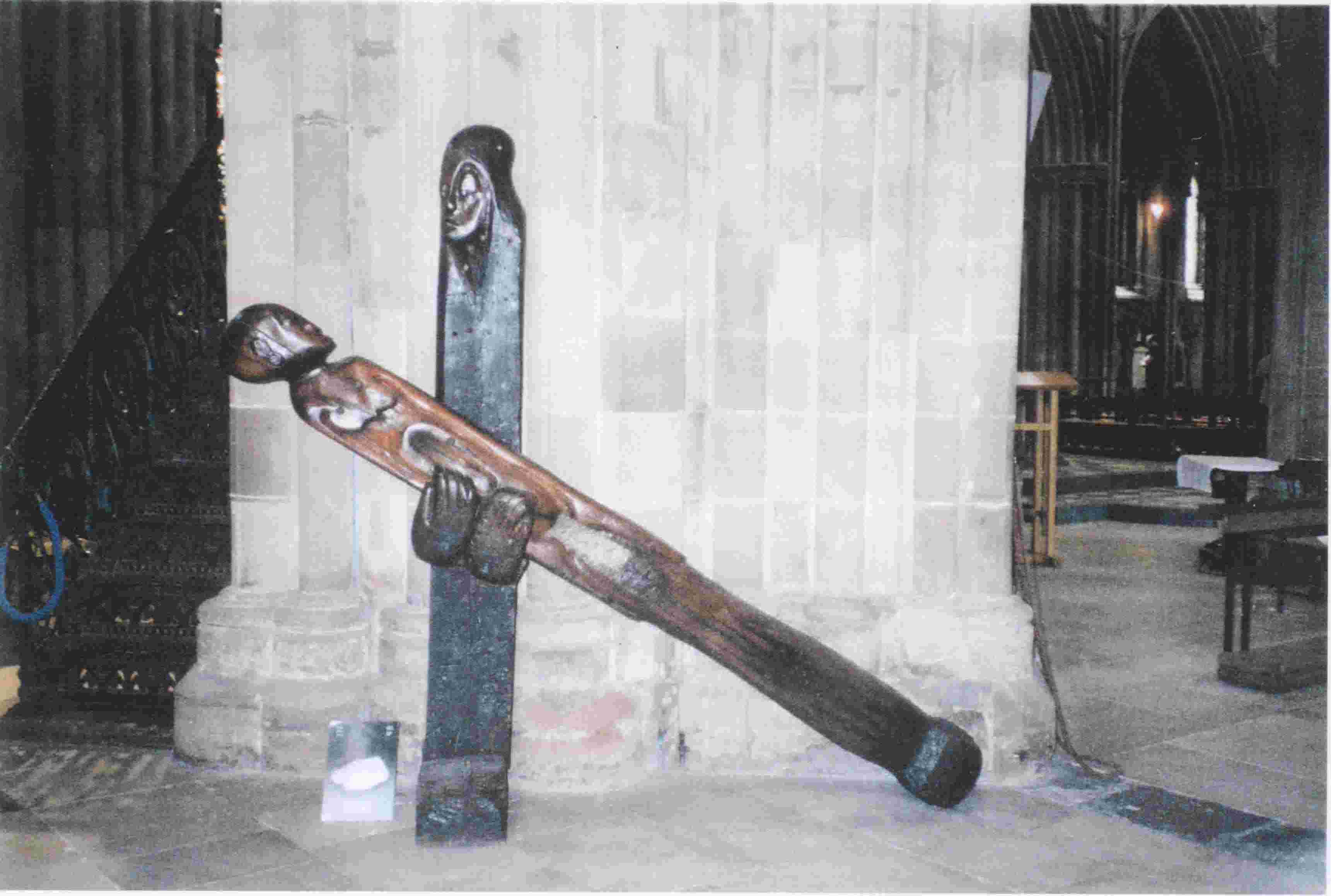
Tsamaya Sentle by Rita Phillips

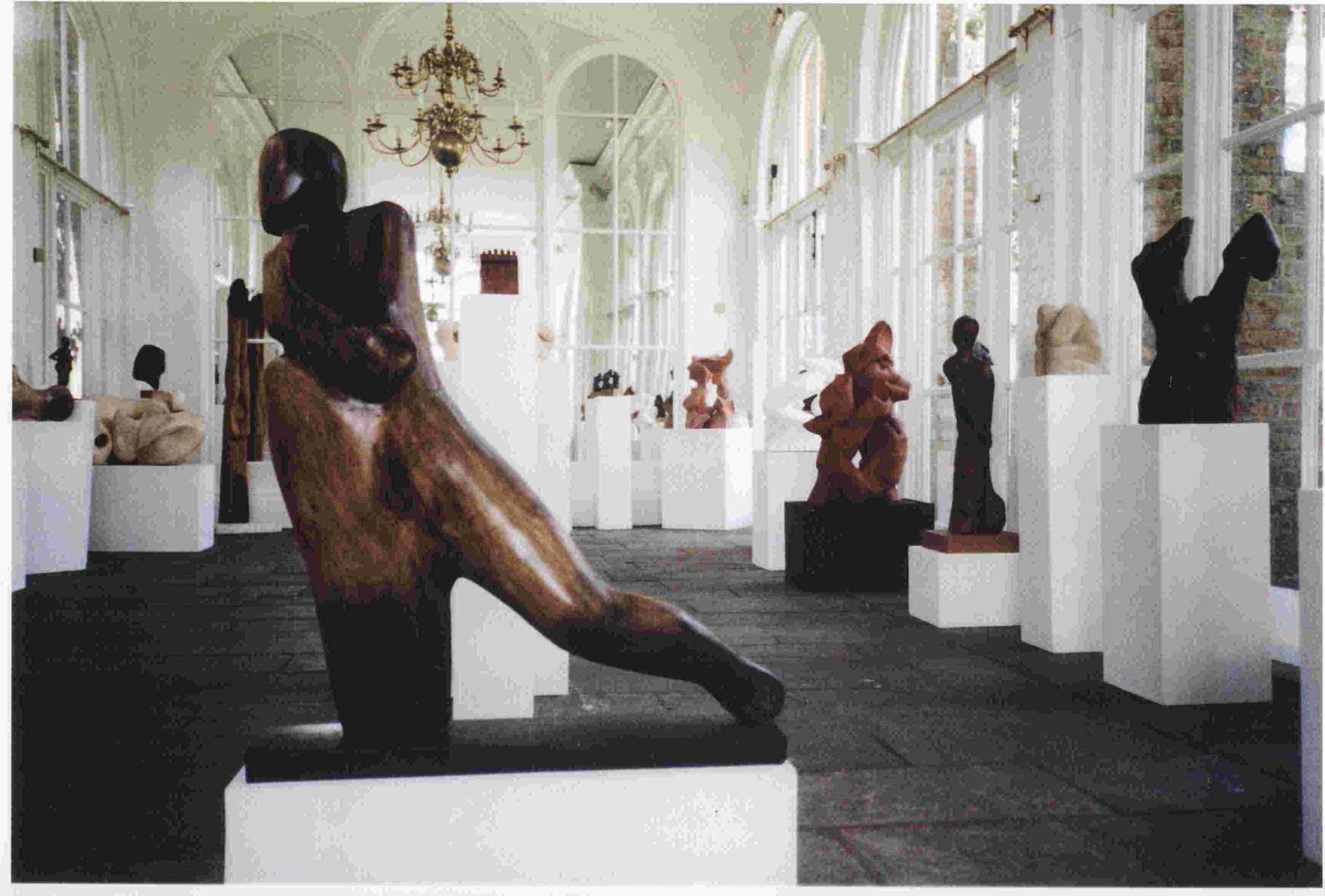
The Warrior by Rita Phillips

Rita Phillips is a British sculptor and artist.

== Biography ==
Phillips studied at the Slade School of Art in London and then went on to study at the Frink School of Figurative Sculpture from 1999 to 2001, and to teach there from 2001 to 2005. She was awarded an honorary Fellowship of the Frink School of Figurative Sculpture in 2003.

In 2003, Phillips created a piece called Madonna and Child. This holds a permanent installation at Christ Church Cathedral, Oxford who have taken ownership of the piece.

Phillips continues to both produce art in a variety of media and teaches in Oxford.
