= Horse and Rider (Frink) =

Sculpture by Elisabeth Frink in London

Coordinates: 51°30′34.37″N 0°8′29.25″W

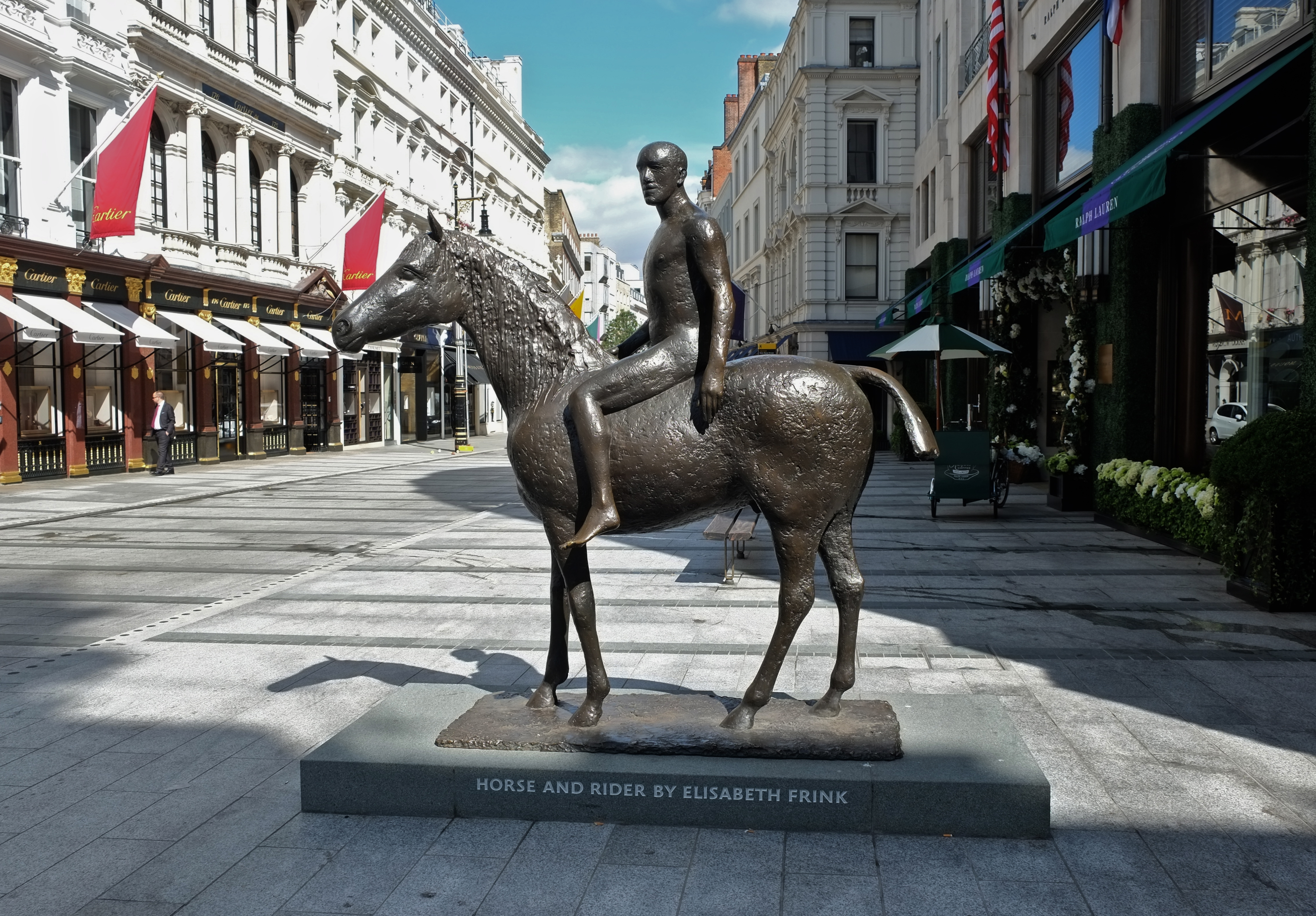
The statue in London

Horse and Rider (FCR 242) is a 1974 bronze equestrian sculpture by Elisabeth Frink. The work was commissioned for a site in Mayfair; another cast is in Winchester. It was described by Frink as "an ageless symbol of man and horse".

One of Frink's earliest sculptures from 1950 was also titled Horse and Rider, and she returned to this subject over decades. A series of Frink prints from the early 1970s held by the Tate Gallery depict a horse and rider.

The work was commissioned in 1974 by Trafalgar House for a development at the southern end of Dover Street, London, near the junction with Piccadilly, opposite The Ritz. It was modelled in plaster at Frink's studio in Southwark, then cast in bronze in 1975 at Meridian Bronze Foundry in Peckham. It measures 244 centimetres (96 in) high. Frink also cast a small version 34.3 centimetres (13.5 in), in an edition of nine in 1974.

The sculpture depicts a man riding on a horse, naked and barefoot, without tack – no saddle, bridle, or other riding equipment. The man's right hand rests on the horse's stylised mane, with his left hand resting on the horse's left flank. The horse is standing still on four legs, ready to walk, on a rough bronze base. The figures of man and horse are slightly stylised, with lightly defined musculature; the horse has a short mane and tail. Both have their heads turned to their left, as if looking at something.

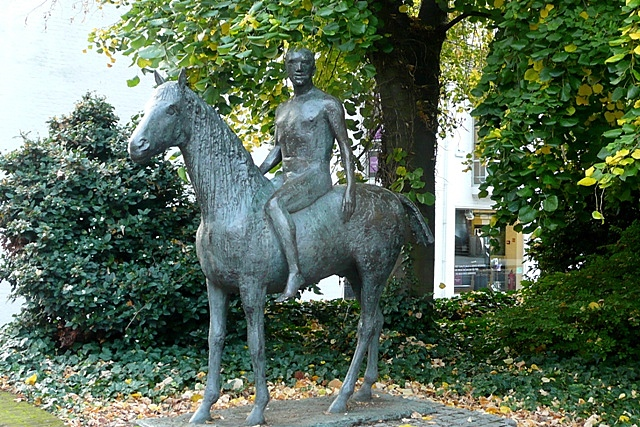
The statue in Winchester

The sculpture was cast in an edition of three. The first was installed in Mayfair in 1975, mounted on a granite plinth; in June 2018 it was moved to the Town Square on Bond Street to mark the new entrance to the Royal Academy of Arts. In 2016 it was listed Grade II. Another cast is in the High Street in Winchester and is also listed Grade II. The third cast was reported in 2018 to be in the USA.
