= Frink School =

Former art school in Leek, England

Coordinates: 53.045°N 2.198°W

The Frink School of Figurative Sculpture was an art school in Leek, Staffordshire. It was named after the British sculptor Elisabeth Frink (1930–1993). It was a small academy with a specific discipline of study closer in spirit to a master and apprentice structure than an educational institution. It was directed by the British sculptor Rosemary Barnett; other artists involved in its educational role included Harry Everington, Alan Thornhill and Ken Ford.

Its prime aim and charitable purpose was to provide an education in the observational and technical disciplines of figurative sculpture and to support and encourage the creative potential revealed in the process.

The Frink School opened in 1996 in Longton, moving to Tunstall in 1999. It initially ran a two-year full-time course, with about 4–9 students entered the school per year. Rita Phillips joined Barnett in teaching. The school ceased running full-time courses in 2005.

The tutorial direction was more concerned with revelation in sculpture than its viability in the art market or the gallery. For two years of their lives, the members of this community were expected to search with perception and imagination and find sculptural means to express that which they could discover. It was expected that this would serve them for the rest for their lives.

The patron of the school was Lin Jammet, Elizabeth Frink's son.
