= Chester, Minnesota =

Chester
- Unincorporated community
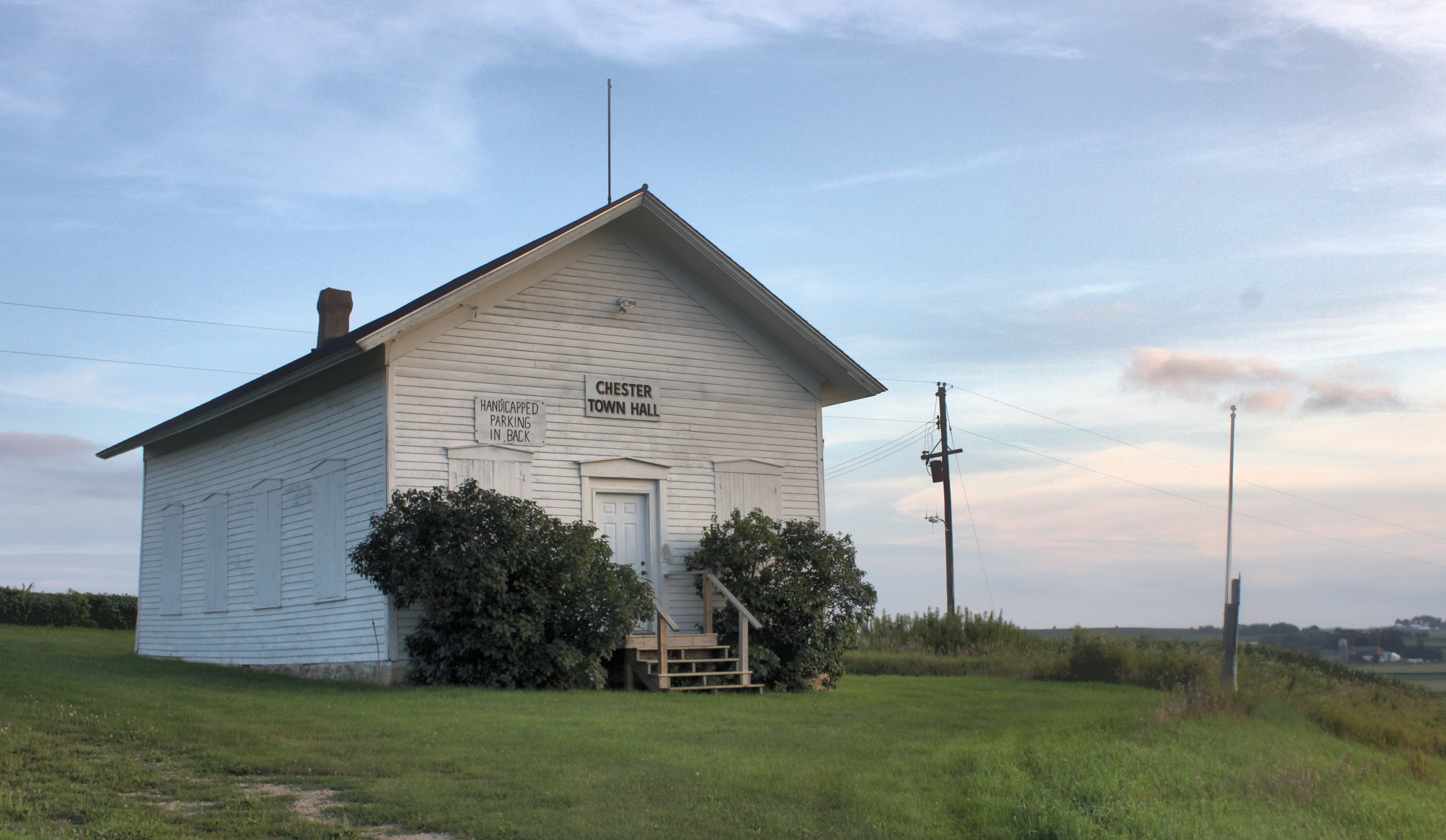
- Chester Town Hall

- Location within Minnesota Location within the United States
- Coordinates: 44°00′25″N 92°20′43″W
- Country: United States
- State: Minnesota
- County: Olmsted
- Township: Marion Township
- Elevation: 1,138 ft (347 m)
- Time zone: UTC-6 (Central (CST))
  - Summer (DST): UTC-5 (CDT)
- ZIP code: 55904
- Area code: 507
- GNIS feature ID: 641148

Chester is an unincorporated community in Marion Township, Olmsted County, Minnesota, United States. It is located immediately east of Rochester along U.S. Highway 14 near Olmsted County Roads 19 and 119. Chester Woods Park is nearby.

Chester was an early station outside Rochester, Minnesota, from which it took its name. At some point in the late 1800s or early 1900s, this station was renamed to Haverhill, the township just to the north of Marion Township, perhaps to avoid confusion with Rochester.

Historical population
Census	Pop.	Note	%±
1880	59		—
U.S. Decennial Census
