= Haverhill, Suffolk =

Town in Suffolk, England

Coordinates: 52.08°N 0.44°E

Haverhill
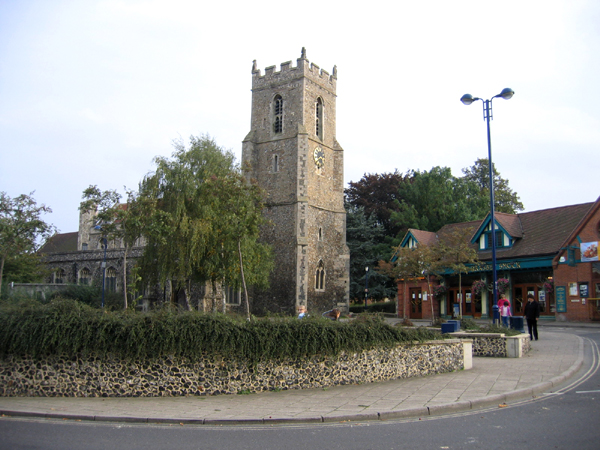
- Market Hill and parish church, Haverhill

- Location within Suffolk
- Area: 10.96 km^{2} (4.23 sq mi)
- Population: 27,500 (2022 ONS Mid Year Population Estimates Map)
  - Density: 2,509/km^{2} (6,500/sq mi)
- OS grid reference: TL671456
  - London: 47 miles (76 km)
- Civil parish: Haverhill
- District: West Suffolk
- Shire county: Suffolk
- Region: East
- Country: England
- Sovereign state: United Kingdom
- Post town: Haverhill
- Postcode district: CB9
- Dialling code: 01440
- Police: Suffolk
- Fire: Suffolk
- Ambulance: East of England
- UK Parliament: West Suffolk

Haverhill (/ˈheɪvərhɪl/ HAY-vər-hil, /ˈheɪvrɪl/ HAYV-ril) is a market town and civil parish in the West Suffolk district, in the county of Suffolk, England, next to the borders of Essex and Cambridgeshire. It lies about 14 miles (23 km) southeast of Cambridge and 47 miles (76 km) northeast of central London. In 2022 it had a population of 27,500.

== Geography ==
The town centre lies at the base of a gentle dip in the chalk hills of the Newmarket Ridge; running through the town is Stour Brook, which goes on to join the River Stour just outside the town. Rapid expansion of the town over the last two decades means that the western edge of Haverhill now includes the hamlet of Hanchet End. The surrounding countryside largely consists of arable land.

== History ==
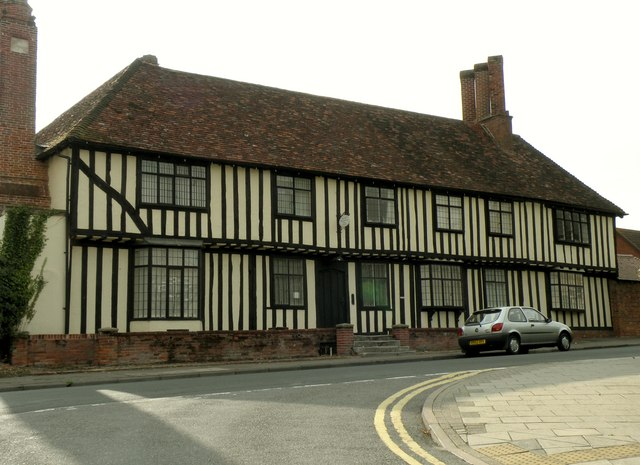
Anne of Cleves' house

The name Haverhill probably derives from the Old English hæferahyll meaning 'oat hill'. Another theory is that it could derive from hæferhyll meaning 'goat hill'.

Haverhill dates back to at least Anglo-Saxon times, and the town's market is recorded in the Domesday Book (1086). Whilst most of its historical buildings were lost to the great fire on 14 June 1667, one notable Tudor-era house remains (reportedly given to Anne of Cleves as part of her divorce from Henry VIII and thus titled Anne of Cleves’ House) as well as many interesting Victorian buildings. The Corn Exchange was designed by Frank Whitmore and completed in 1889.

Following a planning review in 1956, Haverhill was targeted for expansion. This was primarily to resettle communities from London which had been devastated during the Second World War. As part of this plan, new housing settlements and new factories were built. A later review in 1962 planned for a threefold increase in population from the then population of 5,446.

This influx of people changed many aspects of life in Haverhill. The expansion was not without friction. Residents who moved to the newly developed areas complained about the housing density and lack of amenities in a 1968 Man Alive documentary.

Nowadays, Haverhill is predominantly a modern and young town. The relatively small town centre is surrounded by many large housing developments, completed at various periods between the 1950s and the present.

In 1894 Haverhill became an urban district which became part of the administrative county of West Suffolk in 1889, the district contained the parish of Haverhill. On 1 April 1974 the district and parish were abolished and became part of St Edmundsbury district in the non-metropolitan county of Suffolk. No successor parish was formed so it became unparished. On 1 April 1989 Haverhill was parished. In 2019 Haverhill became part of West Suffolk district.

Haverhill Police Station was built in 1976 and the town also formerly had a Magistrates Court. Haverhill Police is part of the Western Area command unit of Suffolk Constabulary.

== Economy ==
Haverhill's economy is dominated by industry, and a large industrial area on the southern side of the town is home to a large number of manufacturing companies. Scientific firms including [EuroAPI] and Sigma-Aldrich have plants in the town, as do International Flavors & Fragrances, and some waste processing, transport and construction firms. Land has been allocated for a Research Park, however, only The EpiCentre innovation and conference centre alongside the bypass has yet been built. A weekly market is held on Fridays on the Market Square and on Saturday the market is on the High Street.

== Sport and leisure ==
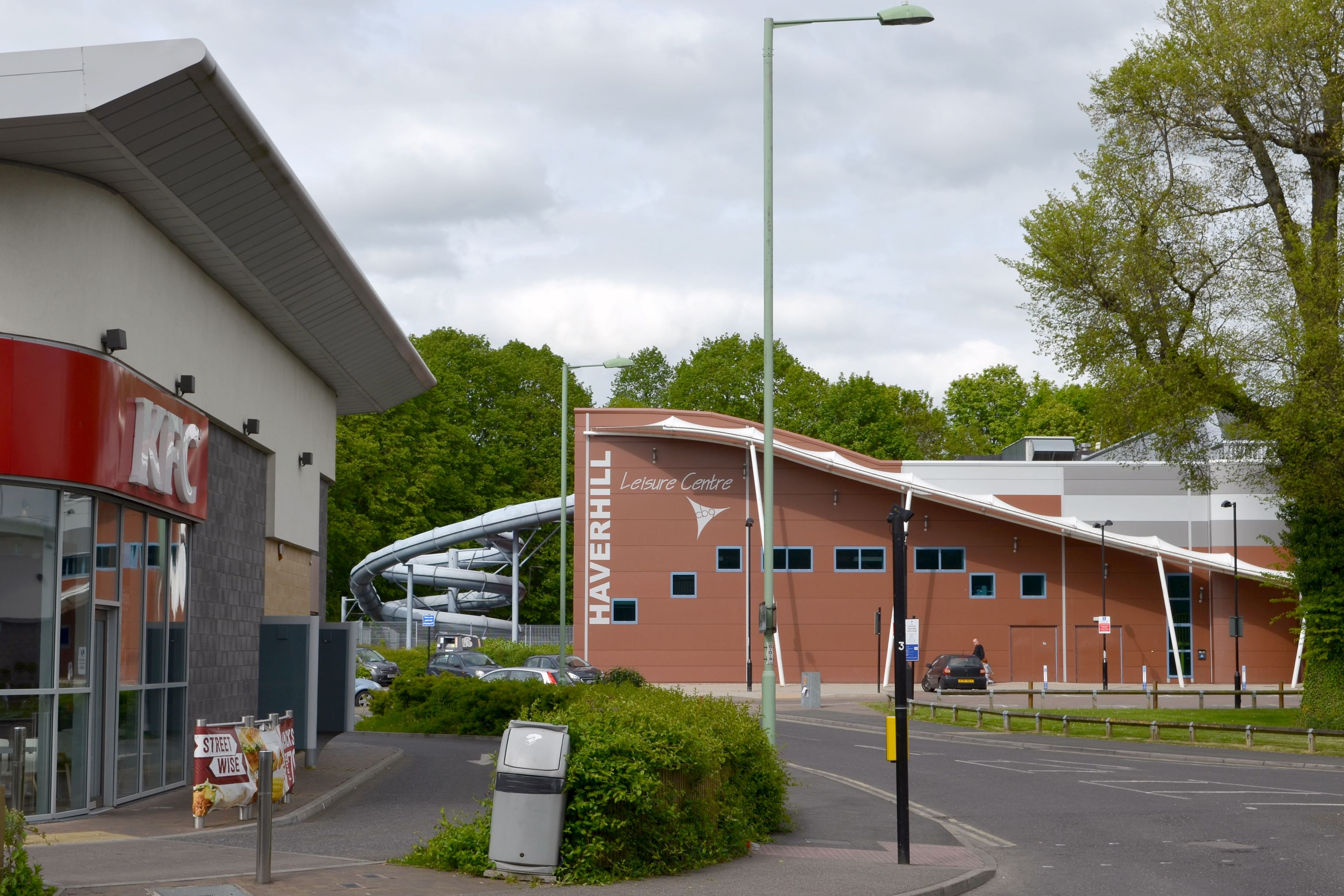
Haverhill Leisure Centre

Haverhill has two Non-League football clubs, Haverhill Rovers F.C. and Haverhill Borough F.C., who both play in the Eastern Counties Football League. The two clubs share the New Croft ground. The town also has a tennis club which is affiliated with the Lawn Tennis Association. Other sporting clubs in the town include a cricket club, a rugby club, and an angling club. Since 2013 Haverhill has also been home to Suffolk's only baseball team, Haverhill Blackjacks, who play in the British Baseball Federation Single-A South league, and who also play their home games at the New Croft.

There are various sporting activities available in Haverhill, including a leisure centre (with swimming pool, gym and a children's soft play area, Kid City), an 18-hole golf course, a dance school, and a skate park.

Haverhill Arts Centre is housed within the grade II listed town hall, and features a cinema as well as hosting live music, drama, dance and comedy. A 5-screen multiplex cinema complex was opened in October 2008. From 2007 to 2013 the town was home to the Centre for Computing History, a computer museum established to tell the story of the Information Age.

== Transport ==
=== Buses ===
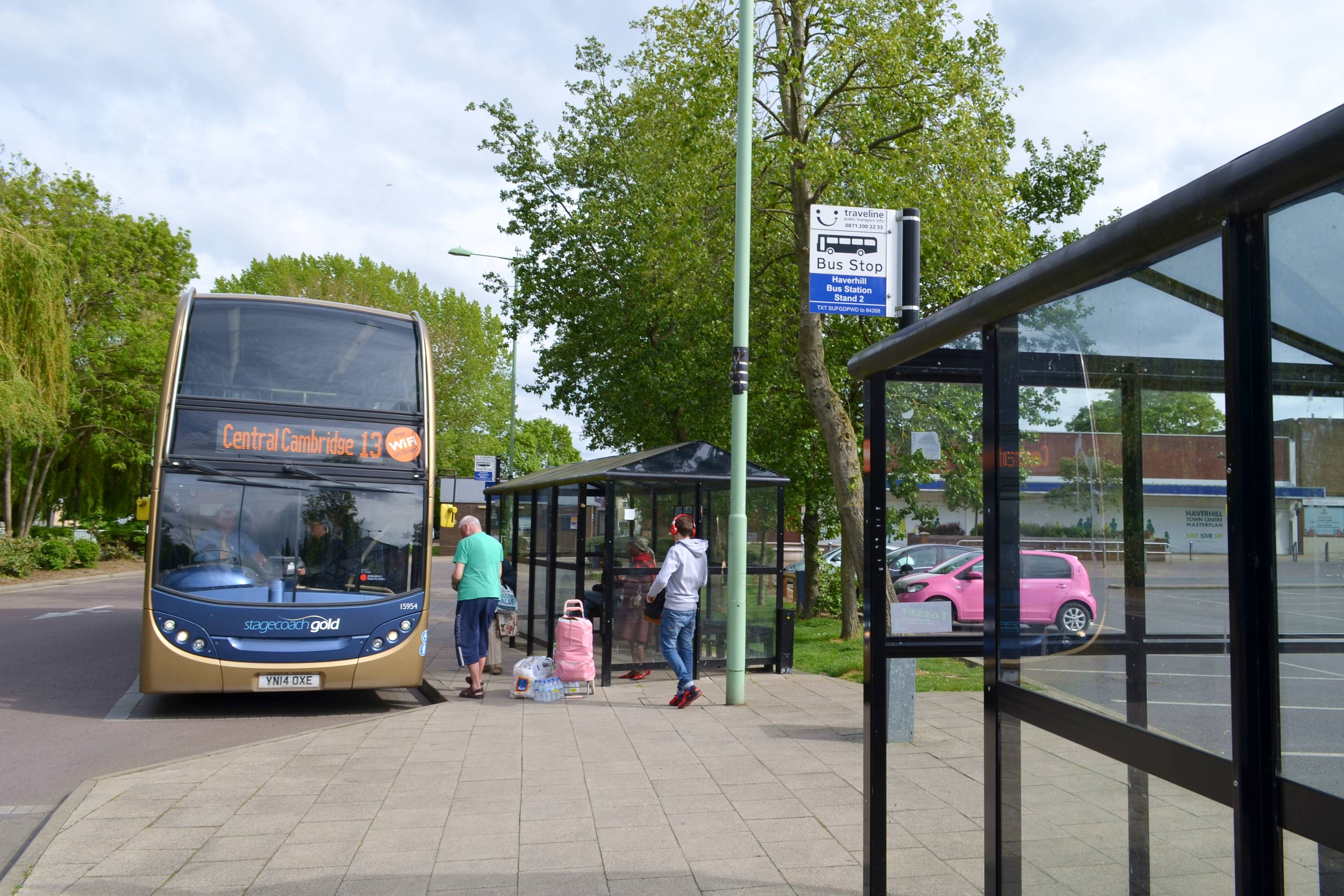
Stagecoach Gold bus 13 at Haverhill bus station

Local bus services are provided by Stagecoach East: route 13 from Cambridge runs approximately every 30 minutes during the day, every 60 minutes evenings and Sundays, along with a supplementary peak-hour express route X13. The bus station in Haverhill also provides local services to some of the surrounding towns and villages.

=== Road ===
The A1307 road is the only major road that connects Haverhill to Cambridge; it also connects the town with the A11, A14 and the M11 motorway. This route experiences congestion with commuter traffic most mornings and evenings. The A1307 is classified as a very high risk of casualty route. A proposal exists to develop the route whereby a new dual carriageway would be built from Haverhill to Cambridge, keeping the original road open as a feeder road and local bus stop route.

=== Railway ===
The town no longer has a railway station; it is one of the largest towns in England, and the largest town in Suffolk, without one. It once had two railway stations and two interconnected railways. The Stour Valley Railway ran from Cambridge to Sudbury and beyond, via Haverhill North; the Colne Valley and Halstead Railway ran from Haverhill South to Marks Tey, via Castle Hedingham and Halstead. Both stations have since been demolished, but many bridges, cuttings and embankments are still visible in the Haverhill area.

Rail Haverhill, formerly Cambridge to Sudbury Rail Renewal Association, is leading a campaign to re-open the railway between Haverhill and Cambridge; as of 2022, a feasibility study is underway.

=== Air ===
For national and international flights, Haverhill is close to London Stansted Airport, which lies approximately 21 miles (30 km) to the south.

== Culture ==
In 2000–01 two thousand inhabitants of Haverhill were photographed and morphed into a single image by the artist Chris Dorley-Brown. The resulting image was displayed in the National Portrait Gallery. This was the biggest photographic morphing project of its kind.

In November 2004, Haverhill made a claim for a world first, becoming the only known town to feature a laser-lit sculpture on a roundabout. The 11-metre (36 ft) high steel sculpture, called the Spirit of Enterprise (or by locals as "the bog roll"), is situated on the main gateway roundabout on the west side of town, and was mostly funded by local businesses.

== Media ==
Local TV coverage is provided by BBC East and ITV Anglia. Television signals are received from either Sudbury transmitting station or Sandy Heath transmitting station.

Local radio stations are BBC Radio Suffolk, Heart East, Nation Radio Suffolk, and Star Radio which broadcast from its studio in Cambridge.

The town is served by the local newspapers, Haverhill Echo and East Anglian Daily Times.

== Schools ==
In Haverhill, there were two academies, Samuel Ward Trust (Samuel Ward, Clements, Coupals, Westfield And Churchill Special Free School) and Castle Partnership (Burton End Primary Academy, Place Farm Primary Academy and Castle Manor Academy). There is also an independent school known as Broadlands Hall School. These have now merged into the Samuel Ward Academy Trust, and subsequently into the Unity Schools Partnership with 14 other schools. St Felix Roman Catholic Primary School is part of the Our Lady of Walsingham Multi Academy Trust.

== Notable residents ==
Nathaniel Ward, the author of the first constitution in North America, was born in Haverhill in 1578. A local school is named after Nathaniel's brother Samuel. Cambridge United footballer Michael Morrison attended Castle Manor Academy. Former Arsenal Football Club player Adrian Clarke is from Haverhill

== Twin towns ==
Haverhill is twinned with Ehringshausen in Germany, and Pont-Saint-Esprit in France.

== Gallery ==
The following photographs were taken in May 2015.

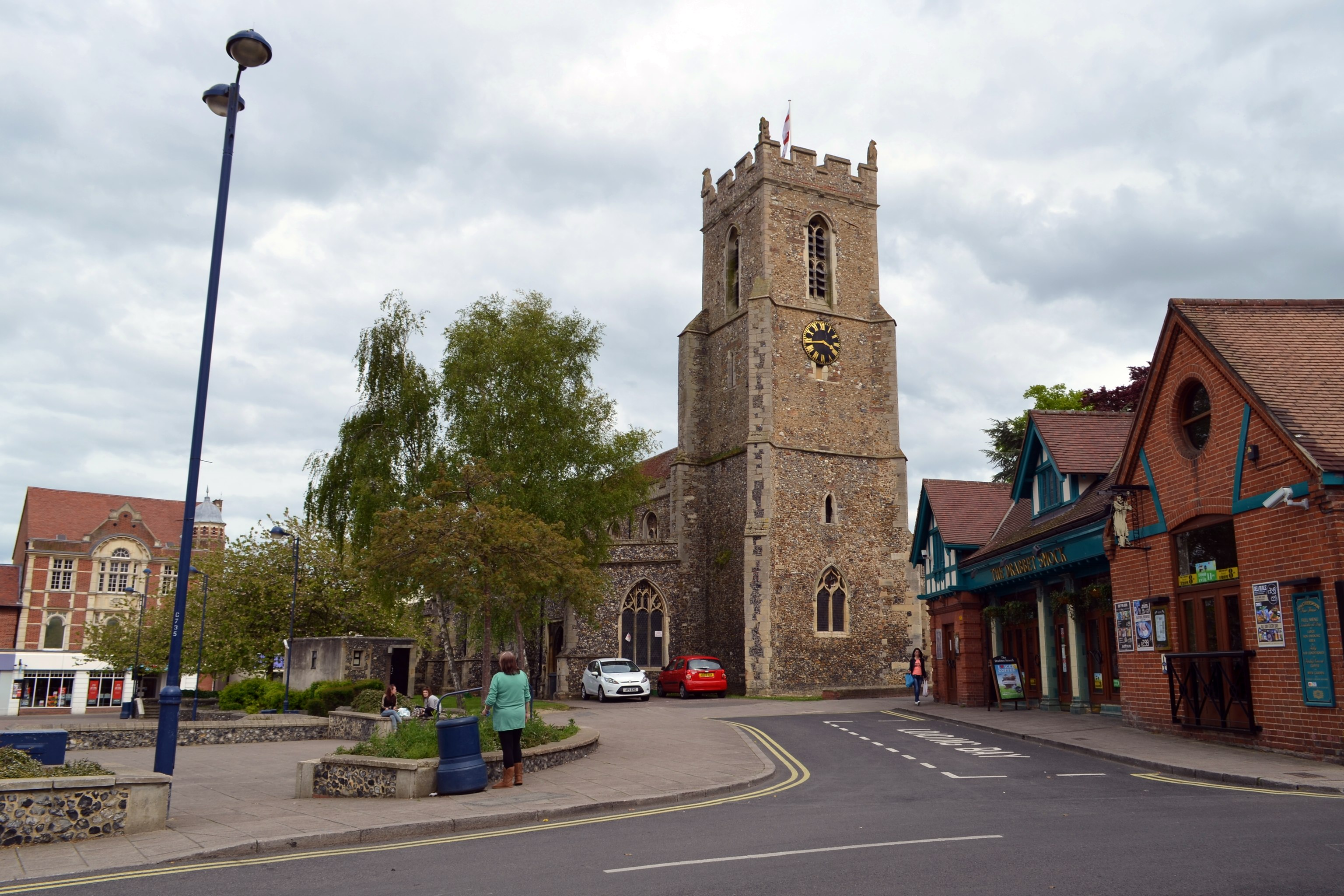
Market Hill and St Mary the Virgin Church

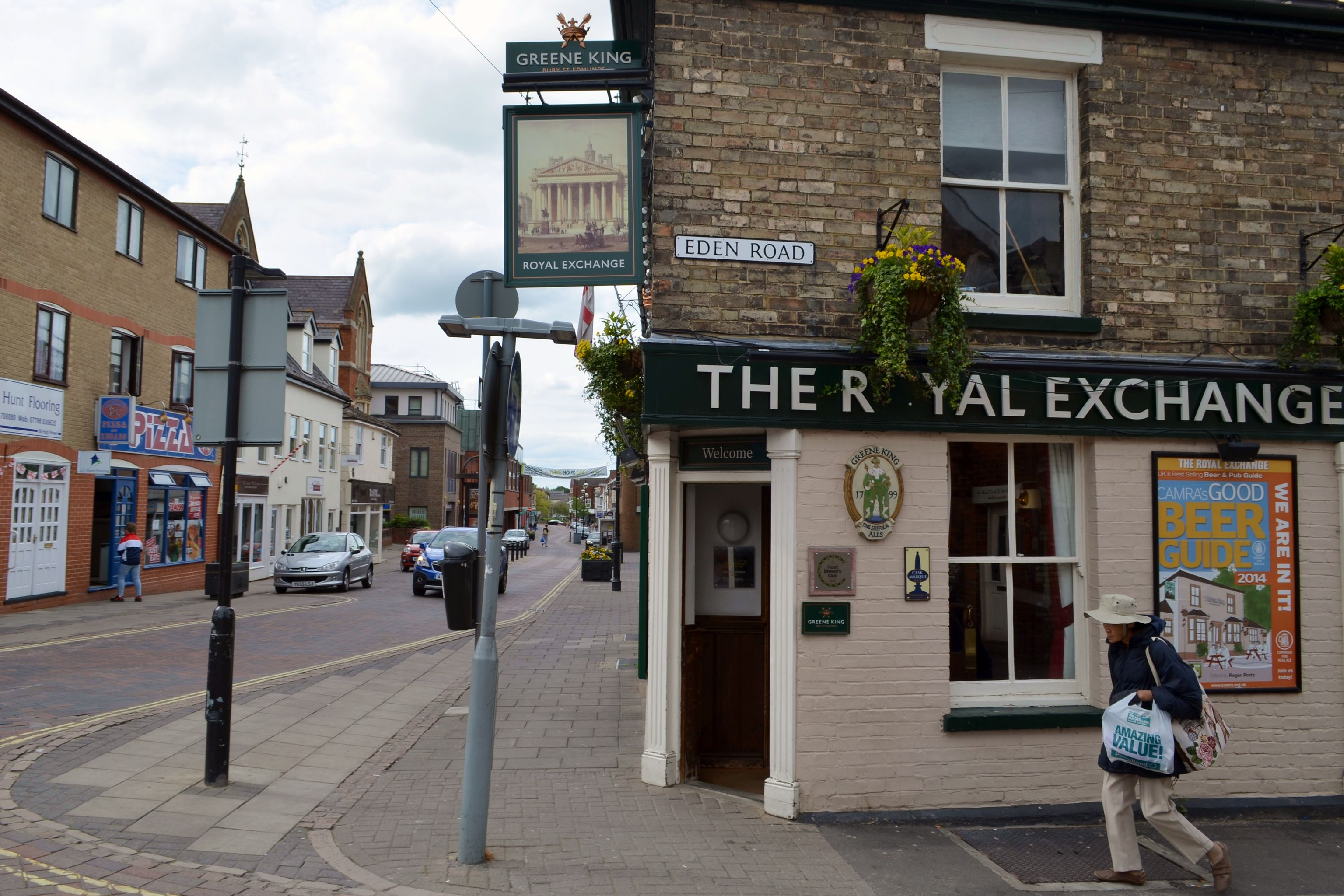
Royal Exchange pub and High Street

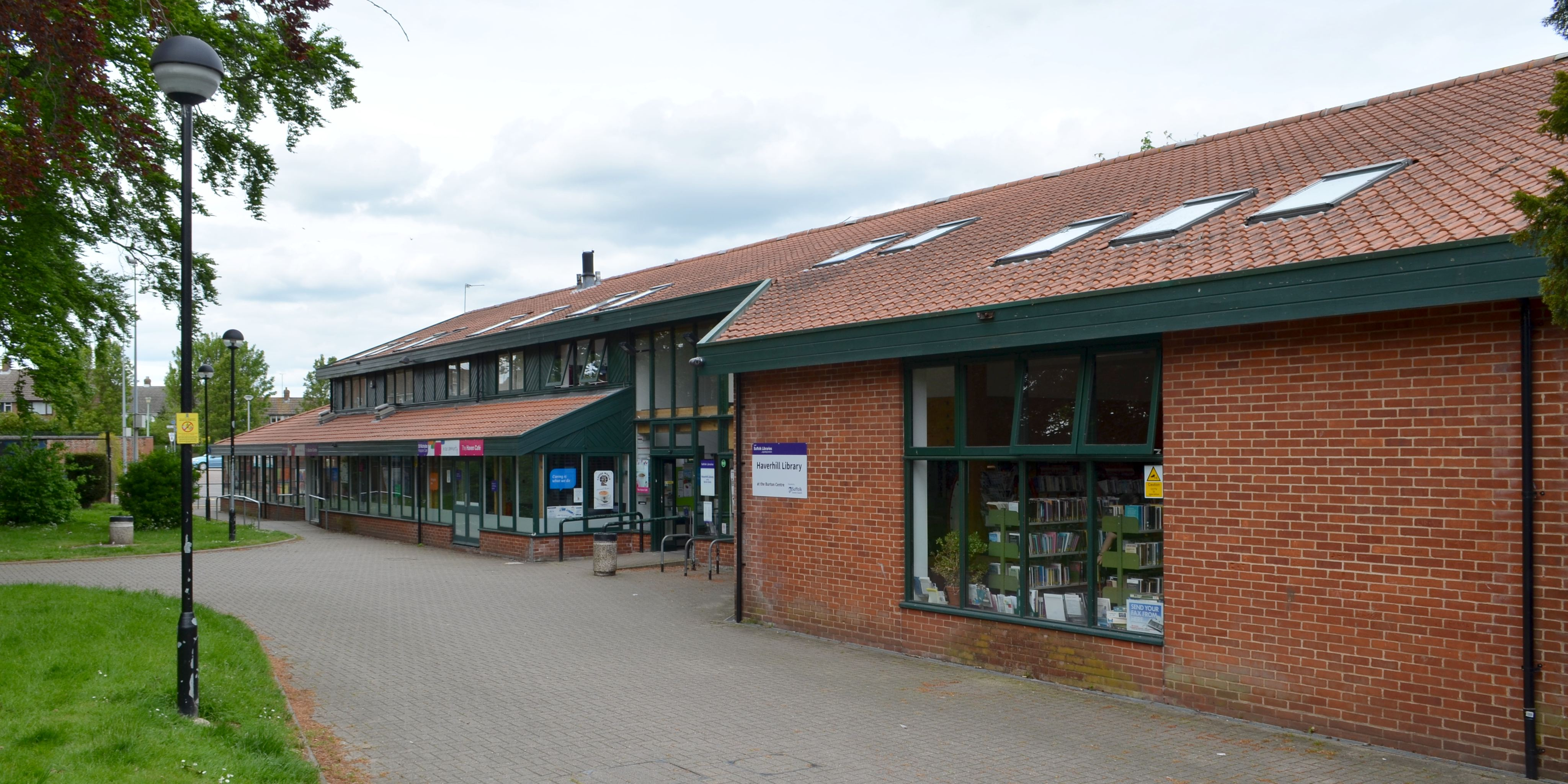
Public library at the Burton Centre

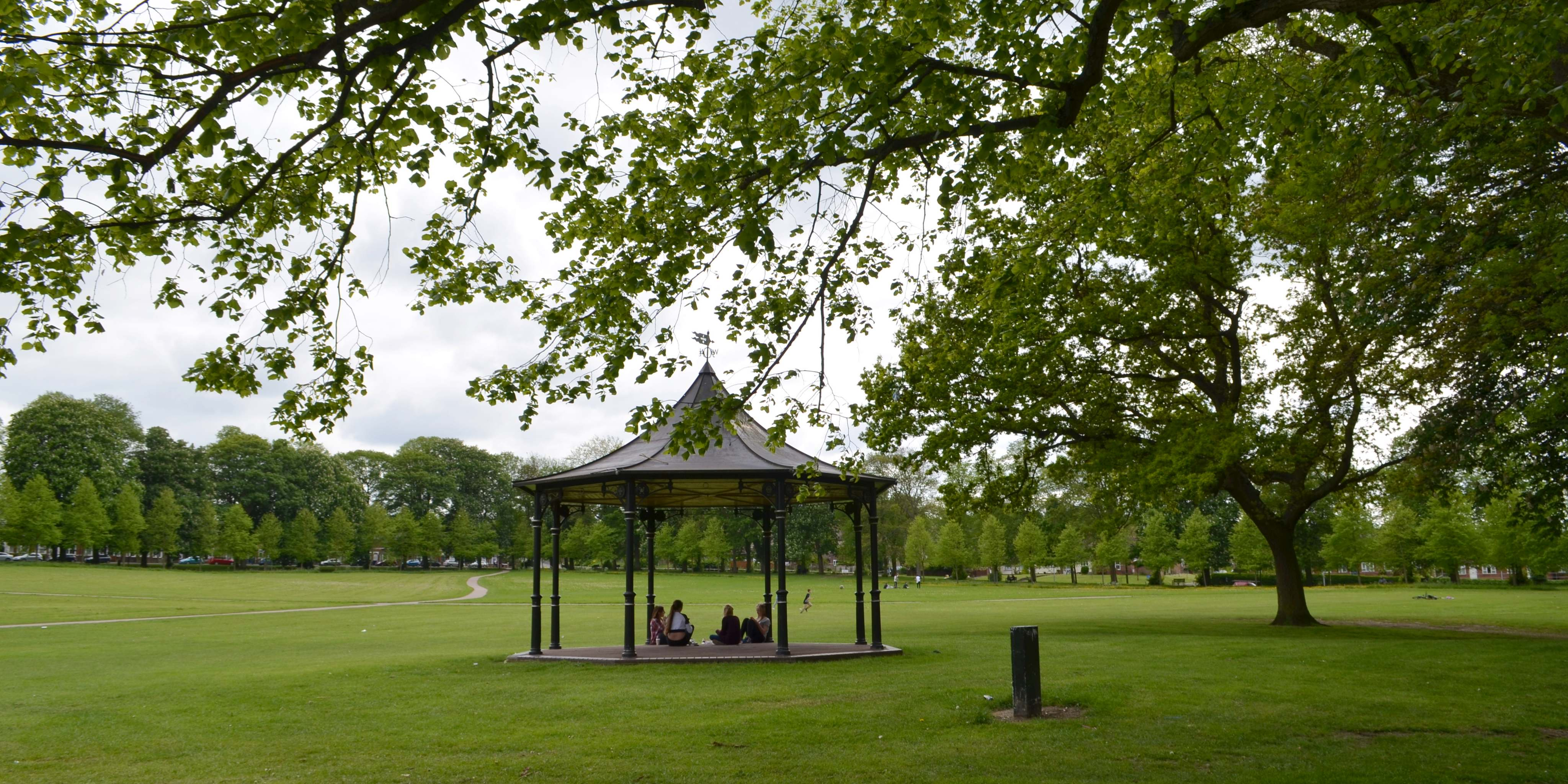
Bandstand at Haverhill Recreation Ground

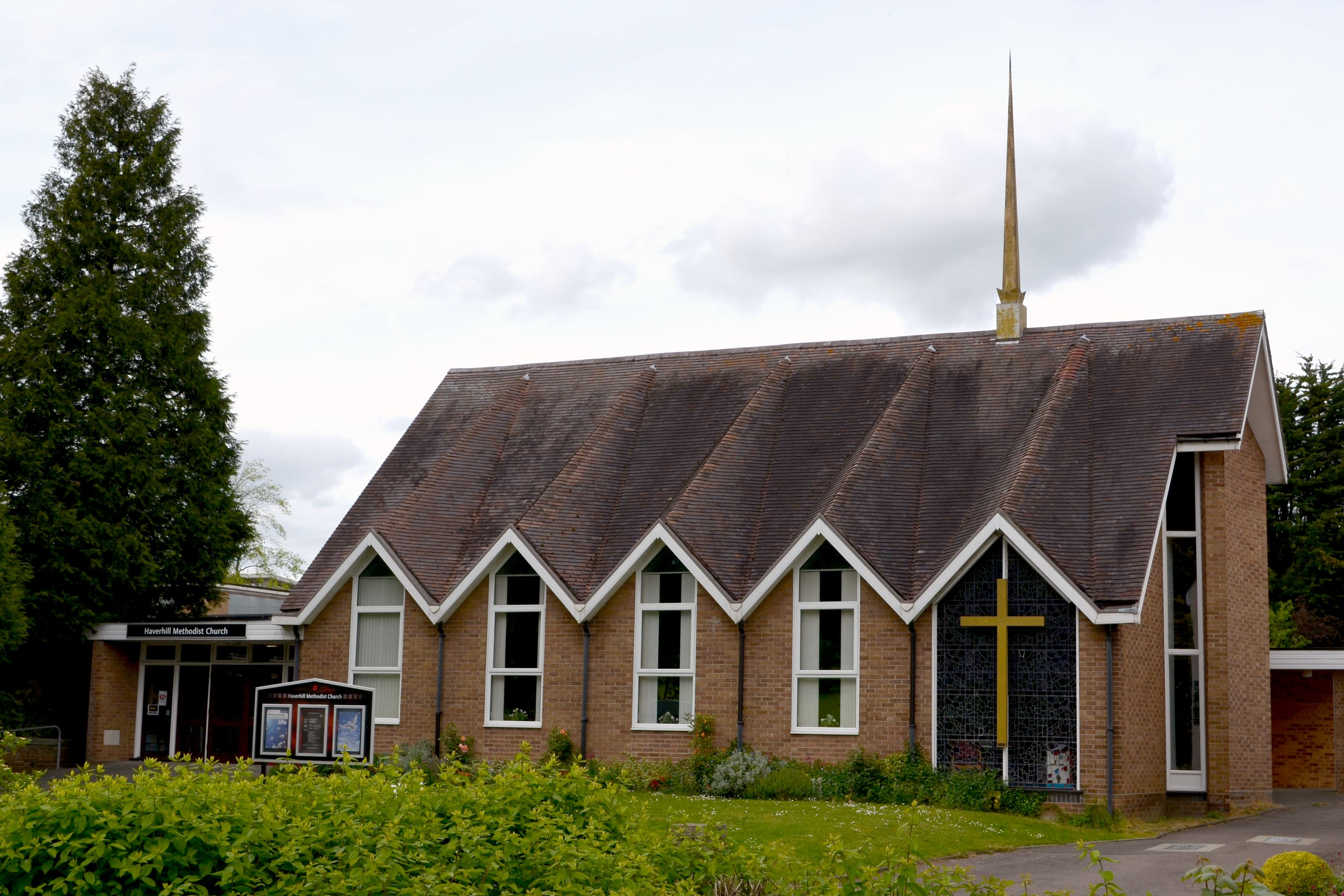
Haverhill Methodist Church

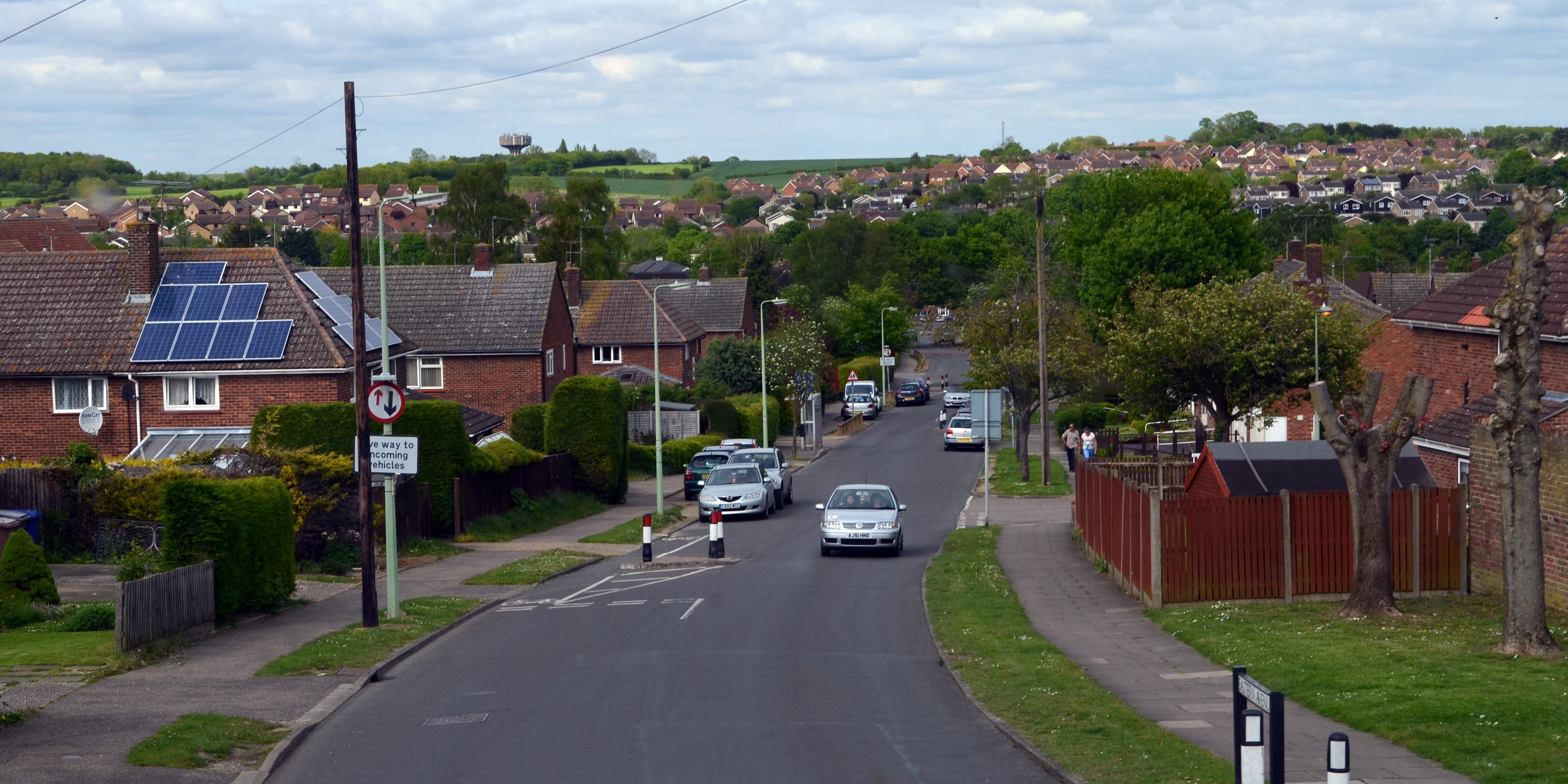
View from Eastern Avenue

== Freedom of the Town ==
The following people and military units have received the Freedom of the Town of Haverhill.

=== Individuals ===
- Martin Neuhof: 30 March 2018.
- Brian and Charmian Thomson: 20 December 2021.

=== Military units ===
- The Royal Anglian Regiment: 18 June 2019.
