= Chris Dorley-Brown =

British filmmaker

Chris Dorley-Brown is a British documentary photographer and filmmaker, based in the East End of London.

Since 1984, Dorley-Brown has been creating a photographic archive of the London Borough of Hackney. Since 1993 he has collaborated with other people on a variety of projects in radio, print, cinema, television, Internet and architecture.

His photography books include The Longest Way Round (2015), Drivers in the 1980s (2015) and The Corners (2018). His films include BBC in the East End 1958–1973 (2007) and 15 Seconds Part 3 (2015).

== Life and work ==
Dorley-Brown grew up on the Isle of Wight, off the south coast of England. He trained as a silkscreen printer and print finisher after leaving school. Later he joined the photographer Red Saunders' studio as a camera assistant. He went freelance in 1984, creating a photographic archive of the London Borough of Hackney where he lived and worked, which he has continued to do.

"Largely self-taught, his cultural education was formed in east London in the late seventies, against a backdrop of strongly polarised political conflict and change. His influences are shaped by memory, both personal and those of others."

In 1991, he expanded into filmmaking and other activities associated with burgeoning new technologies. Since 1993 Dorley-Brown has collaborated with other people of various creative disciplines, as well as groups and individuals in the public sphere, on a variety of projects in radio, print, cinema, television, Internet and architecture.

== Publications ==
=== Publications by Dorley-Brown ===
- The Corners. Self-published, 2010.
- Continuum. FusionLab Inc, 2014. Digital photobook for iPad.
- The Longest Way Round. UK: Overlapse, 2015. ISBN 9780994791900.
- Drivers in the 1980s. East London Photo Stories Book 6. London: Hoxton Mini Press, 2015. ISBN 978-0-9576998-9-2.
- The Corners. London: Hoxton Mini Press, 2018. ISBN 978-1-910566-32-9.
- A History of the East End. France: Noveau Palais. 2024. ISBN 978-2-957207-24-4.

=== Publication with others ===
- The Cut. London: Space, 2011. Photographs by Dorley-Brown, Jessie Brennan, and Daniel Lehan. Edited by Dorley-Brown.

=== Publications edited by Dorley-Brown ===
- The East End in Colour 1960-1980. London: Hoxton Mini Press, 2018. By David Granick. Edited and with an introduction by Dorley-Brown. ISBN 978-1-910566-31-2. Edition of 3000 copies. Second edition; ISBN 978-1-910566-31-2.

=== Publications with contributions by Dorley-Brown ===
- Scarpe: Moda e Fantasia = Shoes: Fashion and Fantasy. Milan: Rizzoli, 1990. Edited by Colin McDowell and Manolo Blahnik. ISBN 9788817241823. With a preface by Blahnik.
- Photographers London: 1839-1994. London: Museum of London, 1995. Edited by Mike Seaborne. ISBN 978-0904818505.
- Future Face: Image, Identity, Innovation. London: Profile; Wellcome Trust; Science Museum, 2003. By Sandra Kemp. ISBN 978-1861977687. With contributions from Vicki Bruce and Alf Linney. Accompanied the Future Face exhibition at the Science Museum, October 2004 – February 2005.
- Face: The New Photographic Portrait. London: Thames & Hudson, 2004. By William Ewing. ISBN 978-0500287323 / Faire faces: Le nouveau portrait photographique. France: Actes Sud, 2004. ISBN 9782742764167.
- Photography Reborn: Image Making in the Digital Era. New York City: Abrams, 2006. Edited by Jonathan Lipkin. ISBN 9780810992443.
- London Street Photography: 1860–2010. London: Museum of London; Stockport: Dewi Lewis, 2011. ISBN 978-1907893032. Selected from the Museum of London collection by Mike Seaborne and Anna Sparham. Published to accompany an exhibition at the Museum.
- The Art of Dissent: Adventures in London's Olympic State. Marshgate, 2012. Edited by Hilary Powell and Isaac Marrero-Guillamon. ISBN 978-0957294301. Dorley-Brown contributes journal extracts.
- The Wick. Issue 3. London: See Studio, 2013. Edited by Marrero-Guillamon. Newspaper with supplement, "Picturing the Wick", by Dorley-Brown and Francesca Weber-Newth.

== Films by Dorley-Brown ==
- BBC in the East End 1958–1973 (2007), for BBC / British Film Institute. Edited by Dorley-Brown. 3 hours long set of 2 DVDs and 40 page booklet with an essay by Tony White. Made on a BBC Creative Archive placement at the BBC Creative Archive Licence Group.
- 15 Seconds Part 3 (2015), for Wellcome Collection.

== Collections ==
Dorley-Brown's work is held in the following public collections:

- Museum of London, London.
- Richard and Ronay Menschel Library, George Eastman Museum, Rochester, New York: The Longest Way Round book.
