= Haverhill railway station (England) =

Former railway station in England

Coordinates: 52.0855°N 0.4389°E

Haverhill
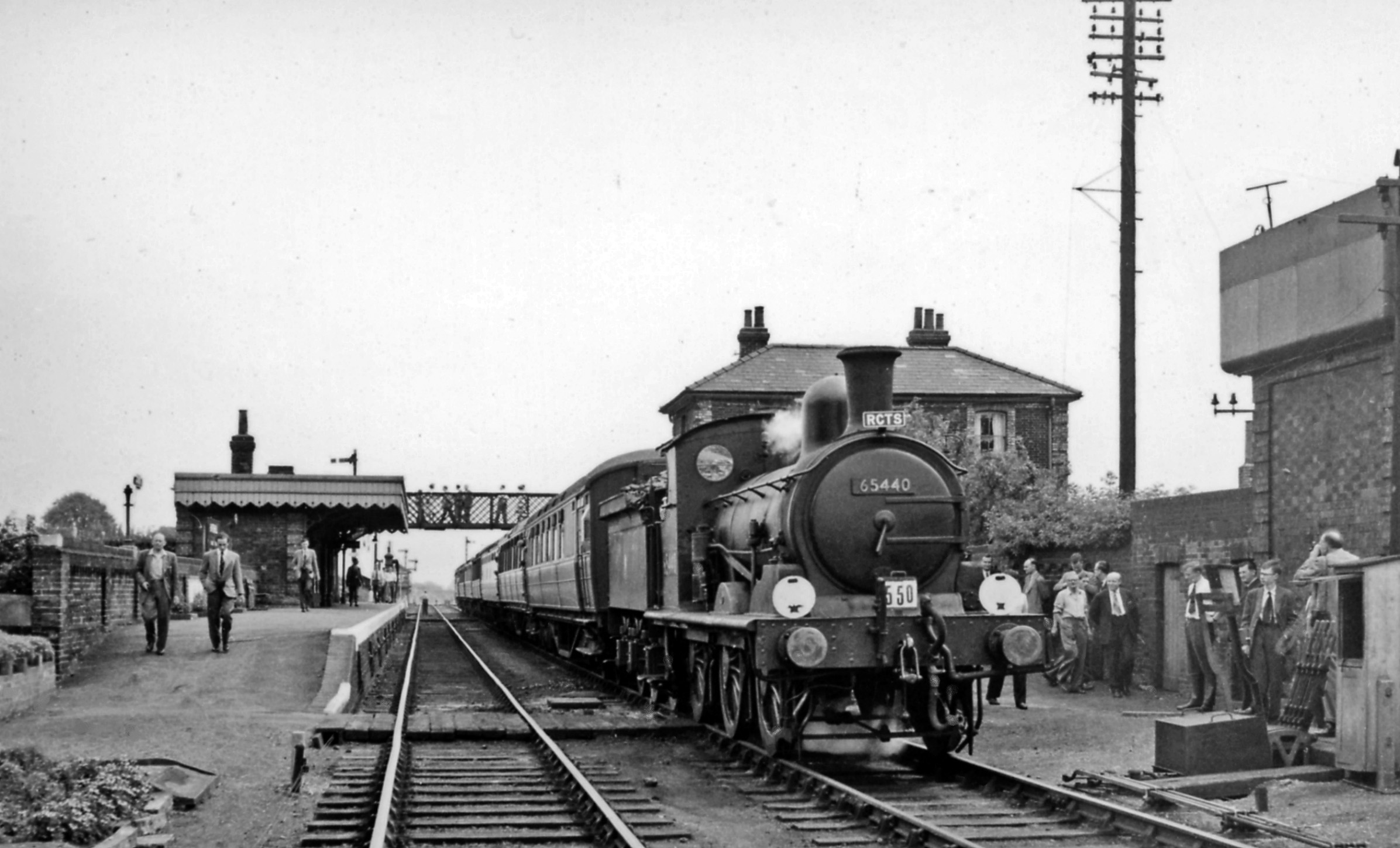
- RCTS Rail Tour in 1958

General information
- Location: Haverhill, West Suffolk; England
- Grid reference: TL672457
- Platforms: 2

Other information
- Status: Disused

History
- Original company: Great Eastern Railway
- Pre-grouping: Great Eastern Railway
- Post-grouping: London and North Eastern Railway

Key dates
- 1 June 1865: Opened as Haverhill
- 1 July 1923: Renamed Haverhill North
- May 1952: Renamed Haverhill
- 6 March 1967: Closed
Location

Haverhill railway station was a station in Haverhill, Suffolk, on the Stour Valley Railway, which opened in 1865 and closed in 1967. It was sometimes known as Haverhill North because of a separate station in the town on the Colne Valley and Halstead Railway.

== Future ==
In 2019 the Cambridge Metro project unveiled a plan to reopen Haverhill and Linton stations, for a commuter light railway to Cambridge city centre.

In November 2023, after the Cambridge South East Transport scheme was paused, Railfuture East Anglia wrote to councillors to suggest that reopening the rail to Haverhill would be a better solution.

Preceding station	Disused railways	Following station
Bartlow	Great Eastern Railway; Stour Valley Railway	Sturmer
Terminus	London and North Eastern Railway; Colne Valley and Halstead line 1924 on	Birdbrook; Line and station closed
