= Rosemary Barnett =

British sculptor

Rosemary Barnett, British sculptor, trained at Kingston School of Art and at the Royal Academy Schools. She was elected a Fellow of the Royal British Society of Sculptors in 1998. She became Principal of the Sir Henry Doulton School of Sculpture, Stoke-on-Trent in 1991. In 1990 she met Harry Everington there and their shared artistic outlook brought about the Frink School of Figurative Sculpture which opened in 1996 in Longton and closed in 2005 at Tunstall.

She was part of the early selection panels for the Jerwood Sculpture Prize and is a former curator of the Jerwood Sculpture Park, then based at Witley Court in Worcestershire and now at Ragley Hall.
