= Great Thurlow =

Village in Suffolk, England

Coordinates: 52.125°N 0.450°E

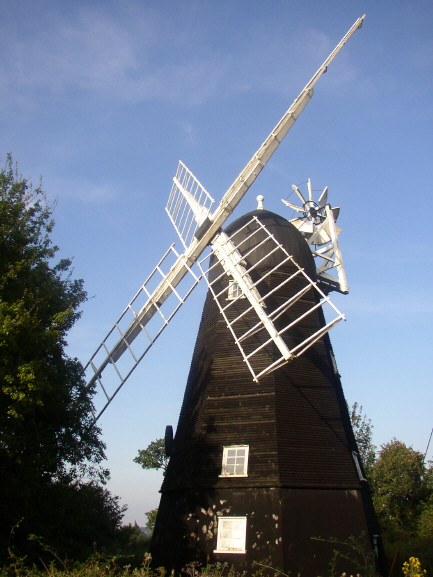
- Collis Mill, Great Thurlow

- Location within Suffolk
- Population: 213 2011 Census
- Civil parish: Great Thurlow
- District: West Suffolk
- Shire county: Suffolk
- Region: East
- Country: England
- Sovereign state: United Kingdom
- Post town: Haverhill
- Postcode district: CB9
- Police: Suffolk
- Fire: Suffolk
- Ambulance: East of England

Great Thurlow is a village and civil parish in the West Suffolk district of Suffolk in eastern England. It is situated in the far south-west of Suffolk, with the River Stour passing through the centre of the village.

A few rural villages are relatively close by, with a sister village of Little Thurlow immediately to the north, and Haverhill, the closest urban location, just over 3 miles to the south. The nearest train station is in Dullingham, almost 6 miles to the north, and HMP Highpoint prison is past the parish boundaries to the east.

== History ==
In the 1870s, Great Thurlow was described as:

"THURLOW (Great), a parish, with a village, in Risbridge district, Suffolk; 3¼ miles N by E of Haverhill r. station. It has a post-office under Newmarket, and a fair on 11 Oct.; and it gives name and title to the descendants of Lord Chancellor Thurlow."

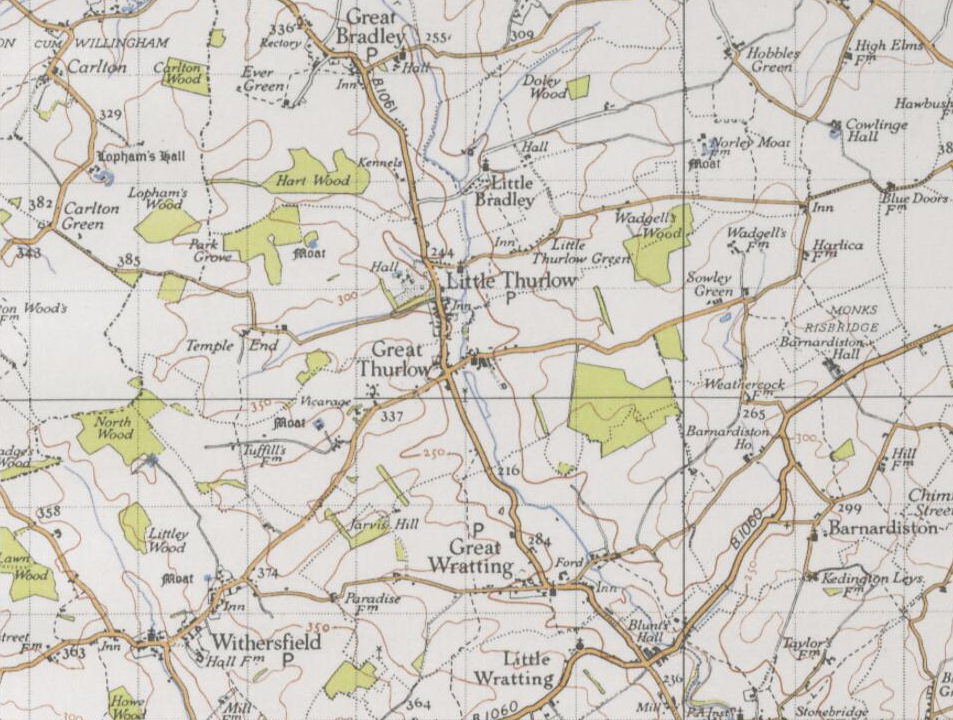
A 20th Century map showing Great Thurlow.

Great Thurlow can be seen recorded as far back as the Domesday Book in 1086, where it is combined with the adjacent village of Little Thurlow under the names "Tridlauua", "Tritlawa" or "Thrillauura". The name of Great Thurlow and its sister village have evolved over time, having previous names such as Thurlow Magna and Thurlow Parva, respectively.

The similar name and close proximity of Great and Little Thurlow gives an indication of their close relationship as each has developed. Both villages have been part of large estates throughout their lengthy existence, where prosperity often shifted from one to the other and depended on the fortunes and preferences of the estates which owned them. The villages did, however, develop subtle differences which contributed to their separate identities. Today they are different parishes, with their own church in each.

=== Roman and Saxon ===
Great Thurlow is thought to have been inhabited in Roman times. A network of Roman roads are known to have existed nearby and numerous artifacts dating back to the Roman period have been found. Professor Hughes, of the Cambridge Antiquarian Society, suggested the Romans followed the valley from Haverhill to the Thurlows and on towards Newmarket, with more sites of Neolithic and Roman remains also found on route within the valley.

Evidence of moated sites, used as Saxon defence systems, are visible in the area in the Glebe, the Island, Wadgells and Sowley Green. These defences provide evidence of Great Thurlow having continuous occupation since Roman times.

=== Norman and Medieval ===
The Domesday Book includes the first record of Great Thurlow, where the village is shown to be in the possession of a "freewoman called Edred". The first reference to the manor of Temple End, in the west of Great Thurlow, is also included. This site has long been associated with the Knights Templar, to which the owner was later awarded. This record of the name predates their foundation by over 30 years however, which leads some to believe a temple of a previous age once stood there. Further support is given to this theory as remnants of building have been uncovered at Temple End, although no further excavations have taken place.

=== The Soame Family ===
The wealthy Soame family became a major influence in the late 16th century. Great and Little Thurlow became one under the Soame family, and would remain so during their ownership which lasted three centuries. Great Thurlow prospered for much of this era, with the Soame family having keen interests in agriculture, while also contributing to new properties and building renovations. The Parish Book holds a record of meetings held for the care of villagers and, under Sir Stephen Soame, almshouses were built and a school for the male children of Thurlow was founded. Many of Great Thurlows now historical buildings were built or repaired during this time, such as the introduction of Collis Mill to Great Thurlow and an extension to the Cock Inn.

The nineteenth century saw much less prosperity for the Soame family, and subsequently for the Thurlow villages, with the later generations of the Soame family being less successful in maintaining family wealth. In 1809, the mansion house of the Soames in Little Thurlow burned down, and when the last of the Soame family in the village died, the family's connection to the villages ceased. Great Thurlow received considerably more attention towards the end of the Soame's dynasty, and this trend of investment continued through the nineteenth century.

=== The Smith Family ===
William Henry Smith, the politician, became lord of Great Thurlow in 1885. This saw the separation of Great and Little Thurlow once again, and continued the significant building developments in Great Thurlow. Great Thurlow Hall is thought to have been restored in this period, while many Georgian style houses were built. Among the new buildings were notable areas of the village today, such as the Rectory, Hill House, Red House, the Estate Office and the Meeting House.

=== The 20th Century ===
Great Thurlow saw much less development in the 20th century. The population declined as availability of farming jobs decreased, and many moved to cities. As a result, very few modern buildings exist in the village. While population and occupations have changed, the villages itself has remained largely the same.

== Demographics ==
=== Population ===
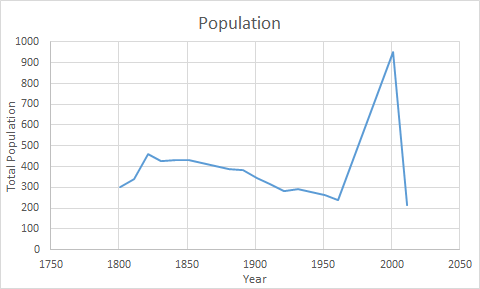
Great Thurlow population, 1801 to 2011

Great Thurlow had a population of 213 according to the 2011 census, with 101 males and 112 females living in the parish. In 1801, the population was 299 and this increased rapidly to 462 in 1821. After this however, there has generally been a negative trend in population, with the recorded population being the same or lower in each successive census up to 1961, where the population was 239.

A significant change was seen in the 2001 census, with the recorded population being 951. These were only temporary residents however, with the 2001 census showing 723 of the 2001 population living in communal establishments as opposed to 0 in 2011. Additionally, 540 of the 2001 population were classed as economically inactive, while this was only 3 for the 2011 population. The population has decreased again since, and the population in the last census was the lowest recorded yet for Great Thurlow.

=== Occupations ===
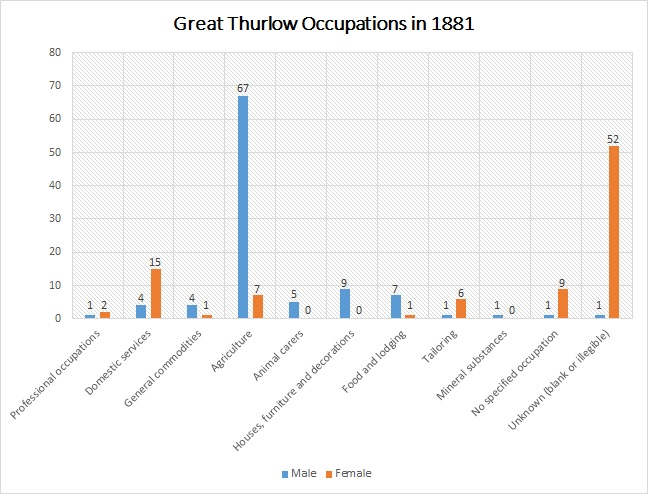
Great Thurlow occupations in 1881.

The village has a long history of employment in the agricultural sector which is seen with over a third of village occupations being in agriculture in 1881. Food, accommodation and construction also provided jobs for a small number of residents. Most of the employed population at this time were males, with many women having their occupations listed as unknown or unspecified. The female population that did work were mainly spread between employment in domestic services, tailoring and agriculture.

The prominence of agriculture in Great Thurlow was driven by the villagers need to be self-sufficient and led to numerous small farms surrounding the area. Over time trade and new technology has lessened this need for agriculture. Most small farms were absorbed into larger ones and the number of agricultural jobs available consistently decreased. Employment in Great Thurlow is now much more varied, with a relatively small number of people still employed in agriculture. Administration and manufacturing occupations are now as common as agricultural, with construction, retail trade and health/social work having all overtaken agriculture in terms of occupation numbers.

== Notable Places ==
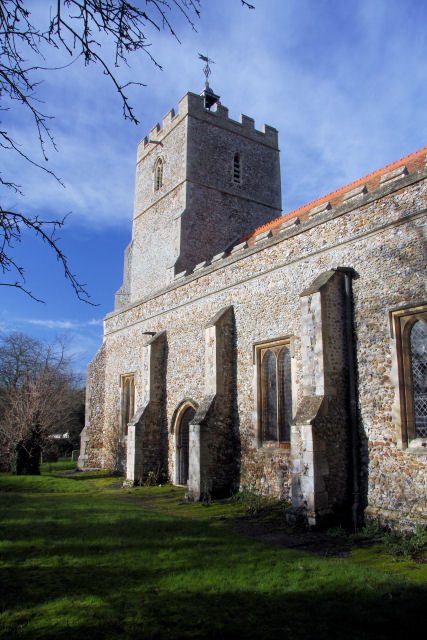
Church of All Saints, Great Thurlow

- Church of All Saints, a grade II listed building since 1961. The building date of the church is not fully known, with the church being mentioned in the Domesday Book in 1086, but materials of the building suggesting that it may have been an Anglo-Saxon timber church which was rebuilt after the Norman Conquest.

- The Cock Inn. Now a restaurant and bar, the building dates back to 1614 but the hall of the building may be even older, possibly from earlier medieval times. Its current appearance is closer to that of a Georgian establishment, however, due to numerous instances of remodeling.

- Great Thurlow Hall, a grade II listed building dating back to the 18th century. The hall is surrounded by gardens and more historical features, such as a barn and brick wall, which are also grade II listed.

- Collis Mill, a smock mill moved to Great Thurlow from its building place, Slough, Berkshire, in 1807.
