= Haverhill South railway station =

Former railway station in England

Coordinates: 52.0788°N 0.4397°E

Haverhill South

General information
- Location: Haverhill, West Suffolk; England
- Platforms: 1

Other information
- Status: Disused

History
- Original company: Colne Valley and Halstead Railway
- Pre-grouping: Colne Valley and Halstead Railway
- Post-grouping: London and North Eastern Railway

Key dates
- 10 May 1863: Opened
- 1 Jul 1923: Renamed Haverhill South
- 14 July 1924: Closed to passengers
- 19 April 1965: closed for freight
Location

Haverhill South railway station was located in Haverhill, Suffolk. It was a terminus on the Colne Valley and Halstead Railway.

In 1924 passenger services were diverted to Haverhill North (on the Stour Valley Railway) which also served the town, but Haverhill South continued to be served by freight trains until 1965.

Since closure the station has been demolished and the site redeveloped.

Preceding station	Disused railways	Following station
Terminus	Colne Valley and Halstead Railway	Birdbrook
