= Marion Township, Olmsted County, Minnesota =

Marion Township, Minnesota
- Township
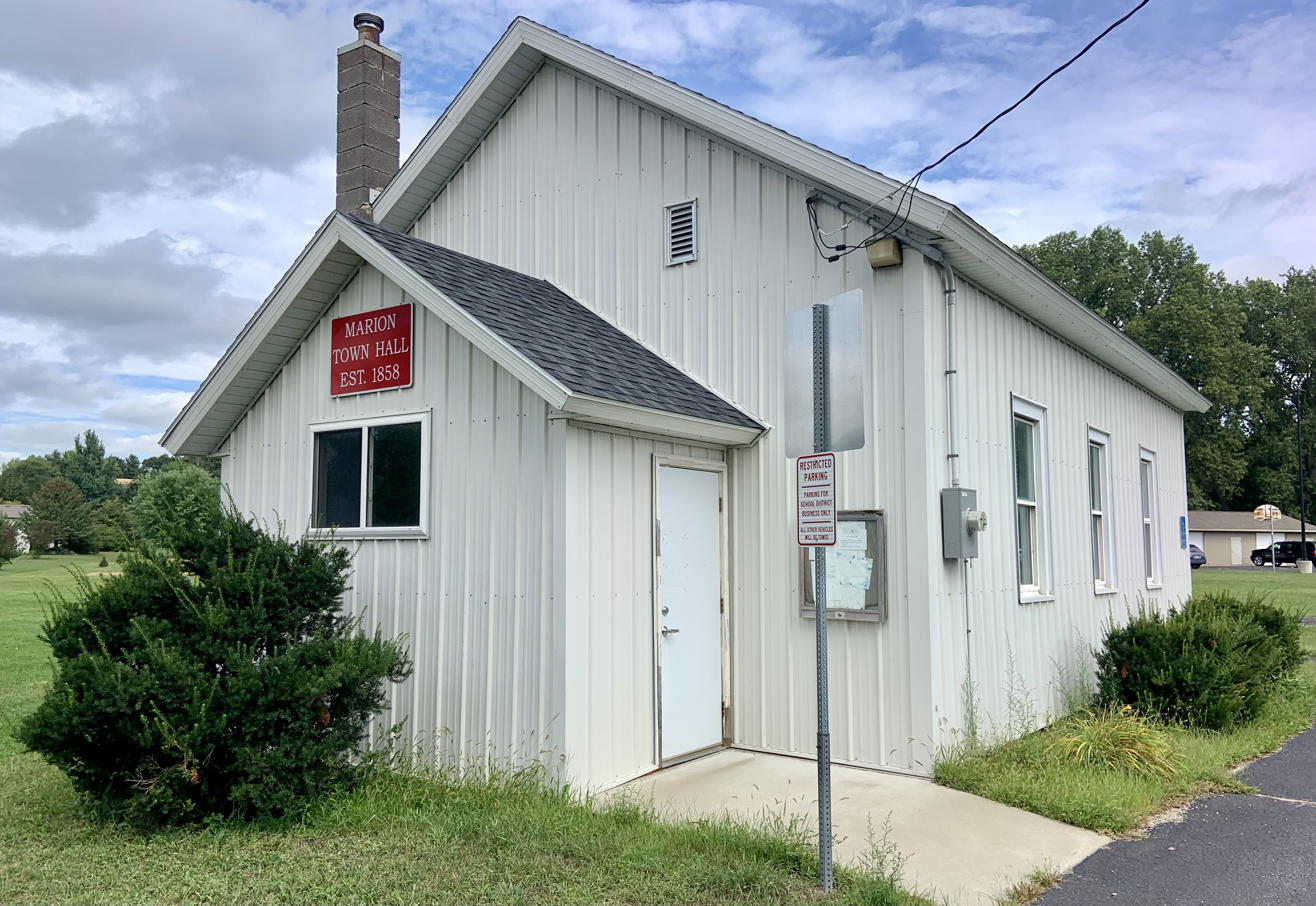
- Town hall

- Location within the state of Minnesota Marion Township, Minnesota (the United States)
- Coordinates: 43°58′40″N 92°23′14″W
- Country: United States
- State: Minnesota
- County: Olmsted

Area
  - Total: 33.6 sq mi (87.1 km^{2})
  - Land: 33.6 sq mi (87.1 km^{2})
  - Water: 0 sq mi (0.0 km^{2})
- Elevation: 1,102 ft (336 m)

Population (2000)
  - Total: 6,159
  - Density: 183/sq mi (70.7/km^{2})
- Time zone: UTC-6 (Central (CST))
  - Summer (DST): UTC-5 (CDT)
- FIPS code: 27-40616
- GNIS feature ID: 0664916
- Website: https://marionmn.gov/

Marion Township is a township in Olmsted County, Minnesota, United States. The population was 6,159 at the 2000 census. It contains the census-designated place of Marion.

== History ==
Marion Township was organized in 1858.

On April 17th, 2026, an EF2 tornado struck a residential neighborhood within Marion Township, damaging or destroying dozens of homes. The tornado had a path nearly ten miles long and was approximately 200 yards wide at its peak, with wind speeds reported at 130 miles per hour.

== Geography ==
According to the United States Census Bureau, the township has a total area of 33.6 square miles (87.0 km^{2}), all land.

== Demographics ==
As of the census of 2000, there were 6,159 people, 2,205 households, and 1,744 families residing in the township. The population density was 183.2 inhabitants per square mile (70.7/km^{2}). There were 2,244 housing units at an average density of 66.8 per square mile (25.8/km^{2}). The racial makeup of the township was 95.45% White, 1.40% African American, 0.11% Native American, 0.91% Asian, 0.06% Pacific Islander, 0.75% from other races, and 1.32% from two or more races. Hispanic or Latino of any race were 1.70% of the population.

There were 2,205 households, out of which 39.5% had children under the age of 18 living with them, 69.3% were married couples living together, 6.4% had a female householder with no husband present, and 20.9% were non-families. 14.5% of all households were made up of individuals, and 3.9% had someone living alone who was 65 years of age or older. The average household size was 2.79 and the average family size was 3.12.

In the township the population was spread out, with 28.3% under the age of 18, 6.9% from 18 to 24, 31.4% from 25 to 44, 26.5% from 45 to 64, and 7.0% who were 65 years of age or older. he median age was 37 years. For every 100 females, there were 104.4 males. For every 100 females age 18 and over, there were 102.7 males.

The median income for a household in the township was $61,470, and the median income for a family was $66,917. Males had a median income of $38,176 versus $29,867 for females. The per capita income for the township was $25,441. About 0.5% of families and 1.5% of the population were below the poverty line, including 0.7% of those under age 18 and 2.6% of those age 65 or over.
