= Hibbard =

Hibbard is a surname. Notable people with the surname include:

- Aldro Hibbard (1886–1972), American painter
- Bill Hibbard, American scientist
- Brian Hibbard (1946–2012), Welsh actor and singer
- Claude W. Hibbard (1905–1973), American paleontologist
- David Hibbard (stage actor), American stage actor
- David Sutherland Hibbard (died 1966), American missionary and educator
- Edna Hibbard (1895–1942), American actress
- Ellery Albee Hibbard (1826–1903), American politician from New Hampshire
- Fred Hibbard, pseudonym of Fred Fishback (1894–1925), American silent film director
- Frederick Hibbard (1881–1950), American sculptor
- George A. Hibbard (1864–1910), American politician from Boston
- George E. Hibbard (1924–1991), American collector of Tibetan art
- Greg Hibbard, American baseball player
- Hall Hibbard (1903–1996), American aviation engineer and administrator
- Harry Hibbard (1816–1872), American politician from New Hampshire
- James Hibbard, American cyclist
- John Hibbard (1864–1937), American baseball player and businessman
- John Hibbard (cricketer) (1863–1905), English cricketer
- Maria Hyde Hibbard (1820–1913), American educator; temperance and missionary society leader
- Michael L. Hibbard, American surgeon
- Richard Hibbard, Welsh rugby player
- Thomas N. Hibbard, computer scientist
- Walter R. Hibbard Jr. (1918–2010), American metallurgist and educator
- Michael E. Hibbard, American Psychotherapist

== Fictional ==
- Andrew Hibbard, character in Rex Stout's The League of Frightened Men

== Places ==
=== United States ===
- Hibbard, Idaho
- Hibbard, Indiana
- Hibbard, Montana
- Charles H. Hibbard House, Illinois

== See also ==
- Hibbard & Darrin, French coachbuilder
- Hibberd
