= Yeldham =

Yeldham may refer to:

== Places ==
- Great Yeldham, a village in north Essex, England
- Little Yeldham, a small village in north west Essex, England
- Yeldham railway station, in Great Yeldham, Essex, England

== People ==
- Yeldham (surname)
