= Colchester Arts Centre =

Arts centre in Colchester, Essex, England

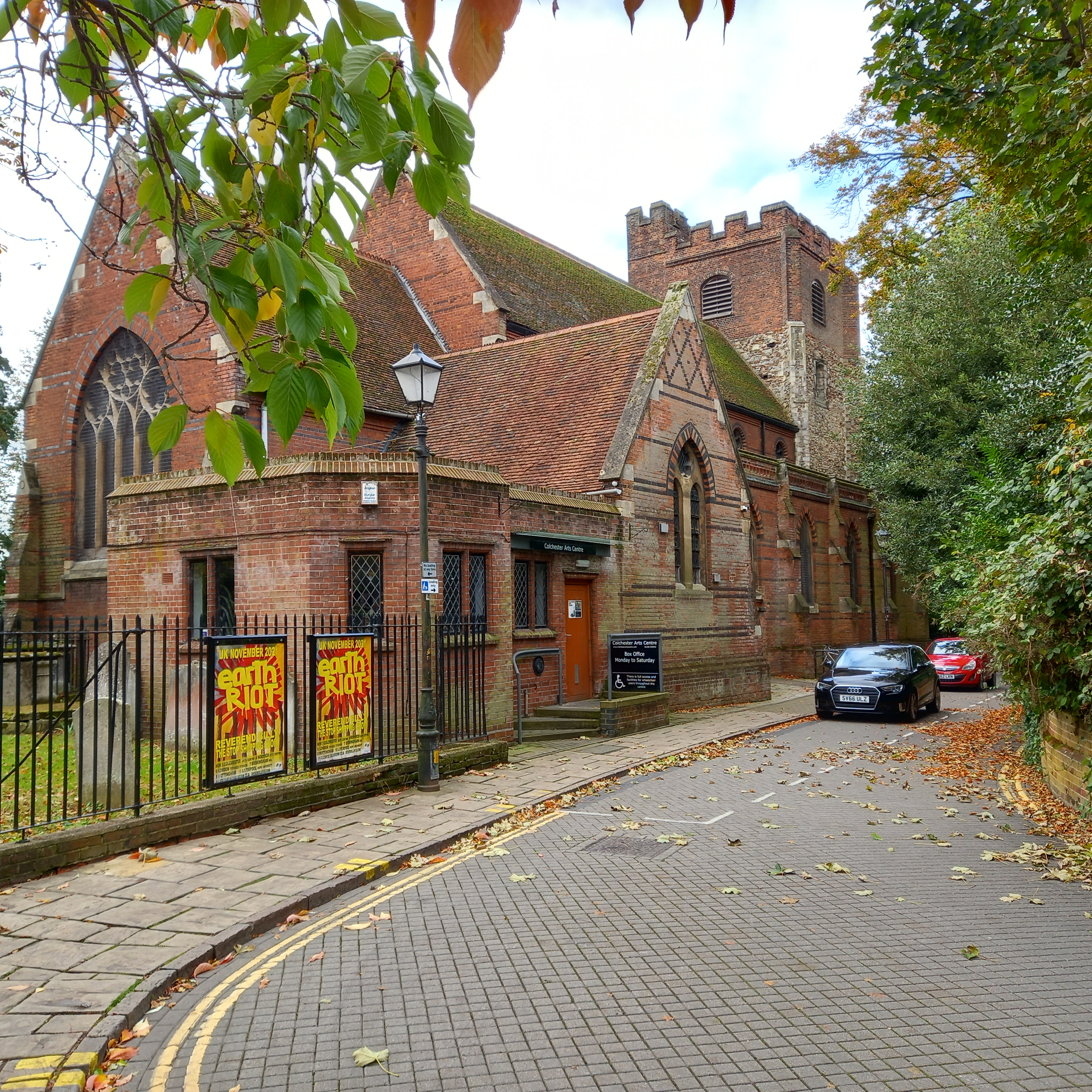
- Colchester Arts Centre, seen from Church Street
- Interactive map of Colchester Arts Centre
- Former names: The Church of St Mary-at-the-Walls
- Address: Church Street; Colchester; CO1 1NF
- Location: Colchester, Essex
- Coordinates: 51.888584°N 0.894510°E
- Capacity: c. 300

Construction
- Built: 1872
- Opened: 1980
- Architect: Arthur Blomfield

Website
- Official website

Colchester Arts Centre is an arts centre in Colchester, Essex, which is located in a former Church of England parish church, the church of Saint Mary-at-the-Walls, a name derived from its proximity to the Roman town walls. The church may have had Anglo-Saxon origins but was first mentioned in the early 13th century. The building was badly damaged during the English Civil War and was fully rebuilt twice in the 18th and 19th centuries, with the exception of the 16th century bell tower which has been heavily restored. The church became redundant in 1978 and opened as an arts centre in 1980. It hosts a wide variety of events, specialising in emerging talent, with a number of well known artists having made early appearances at the venue. It is a Grade II listed building.

== Church history ==
=== Medieval era ===
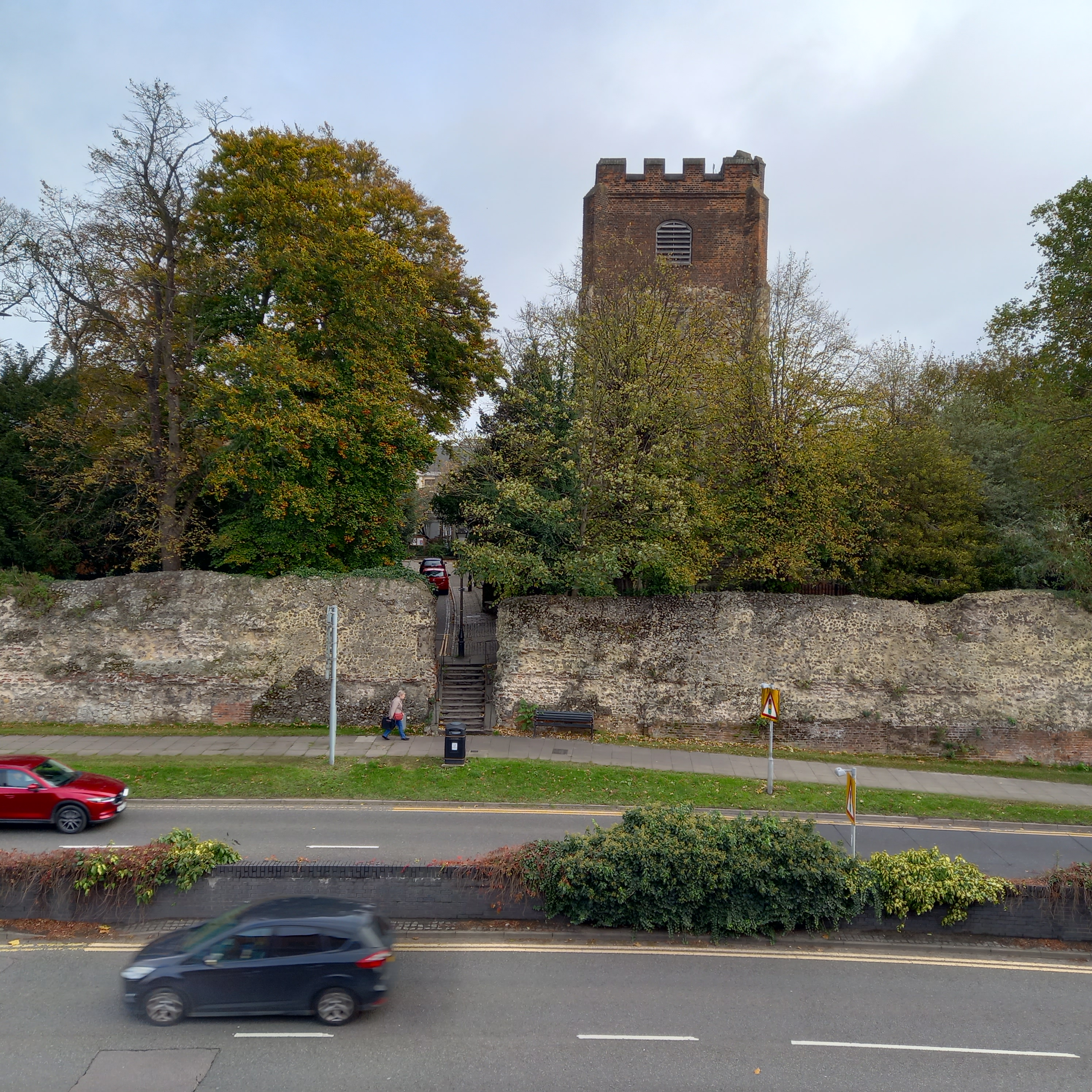
The tower of St Mary's church, showing the proximity to the Roman wall. The brick repair of damage to the tower from the Civil War is visible.

The early history of the church is obscure, but excavations in 1962 to the south of the present churchyard revealed some burial cists dated to before the Norman Conquest. It was possibly the location of a private chapel for the Bishops of London who owned land in the town. The first record of the church was in a lease of 1206 in which the bishop retained the advowson, the right to appoint the rector, a tradition which was maintained until the church closed in 1978. The same lease also includes a school in the parish, which has been taken as the origin of Colchester Royal Grammar School. Dedicated to Saint Mary the Virgin, the church acquired its sobriquet "ad murum" or "at-the-walls" to distinguish it from the church dedicated to Saint Mary Magdalene in the western end of the town. (Note: The 12th century St Mary Magdalen's Church in Magdalen Green was rebuilt in 1852, closed in 1986 and subsequently demolished.)

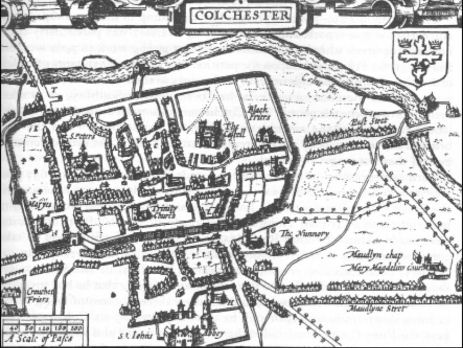
A 1610 map of Colchester by John Speed shows St Mary's in the southwest corner of the town walls.

The parish was poor, the wealthier districts of Colchester being closer to the port at The Hythe, so priests tended not to stay long. In 1440, a papal dispensation was received for the rector of St Mary's to hold the benefice of a second parish, a custom which continued until the 19th century. The medieval church building had a nave, a chancel, a south porch and a northwest tower, which was rebuilt in 1534 using rubble masonry containing Roman bricks, finished with limestone dressings, which included a frieze of shields around the base, still visible today.

=== Renaissance ===
The rectors of St Mary's appear to have supported the Protestant Reformation; records show that they sold off the church's silver-gilt pyx and other accoutrements in 1534 and removed stained glass windows in 1548. One rector was fined in 1544 for failing to read out the king's statutes and for living with a woman, while in 1554 during the Marian persecutions, another married rector of St Mary's had to leave the town before the arrival of Bishop Edmund Bonner's inquisitors. Another rector, Hugh Allen, left Colchester in 1572 to join the English forces in Ireland during the First Desmond Rebellion and was appointed Bishop of Down and Connor.

=== Siege of Colchester ===
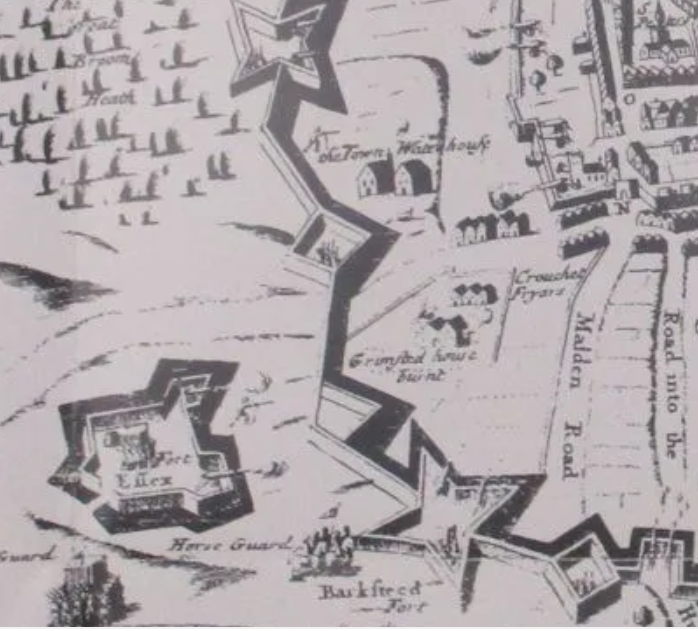
Detail of a 1648 map depicting the siege, showing the Royalist guns in St Mary's churchyard (top right) and the Parliamentarian batteries ranged against them.

The Siege of Colchester began in June 1648 during the Second English Civil War when the town, which had largely supported parliament against the king, was seized by a Royalist force led by the Earl of Norwich and was besieged there by a Parliamentarian force led by Sir Thomas Fairfax, who surrounded the town with artillery batteries and entrenchments.

The Royalist defenders established an artillery battery in St Mary's churchyard to fire over the town wall, directed by observers on top of the church bell tower. Under the command of a one-eyed master gunner called Thompson, they hoisted a brass saker (a small cannon firing a 5.25 pounds (2.38 kg) ball) into St Mary's tower, where it was mounted on a platform built over the bell-frames. From that position, the Royalist gunners could enfilade the besiegers trenches, and even reach Fairfax's headquarters at Lexden, more than 1 mile (1.6 km) down the road to London. To counter this threat, the Parliamentarians established a battery of heavier cannons and began to fire on St Mary's on 24 July, with the result that the Royalists began to withdraw their guns from the churchyard. On the following day, the Parliamentarians succeeded in partially demolishing the church tower, dislodging the saker and killing Thompson in the process. There is no evidence to support the modern suggestion that this event is the origin of the nursery rhyme, Humpty Dumpty.

The building's role in the siege has been commemorated in the play Bury Me In Colchester Mud, a contemporary piece written by local playwright Dr. Paul T. Davies, that follows a family hiding in church during the siege.

=== 18th century ===
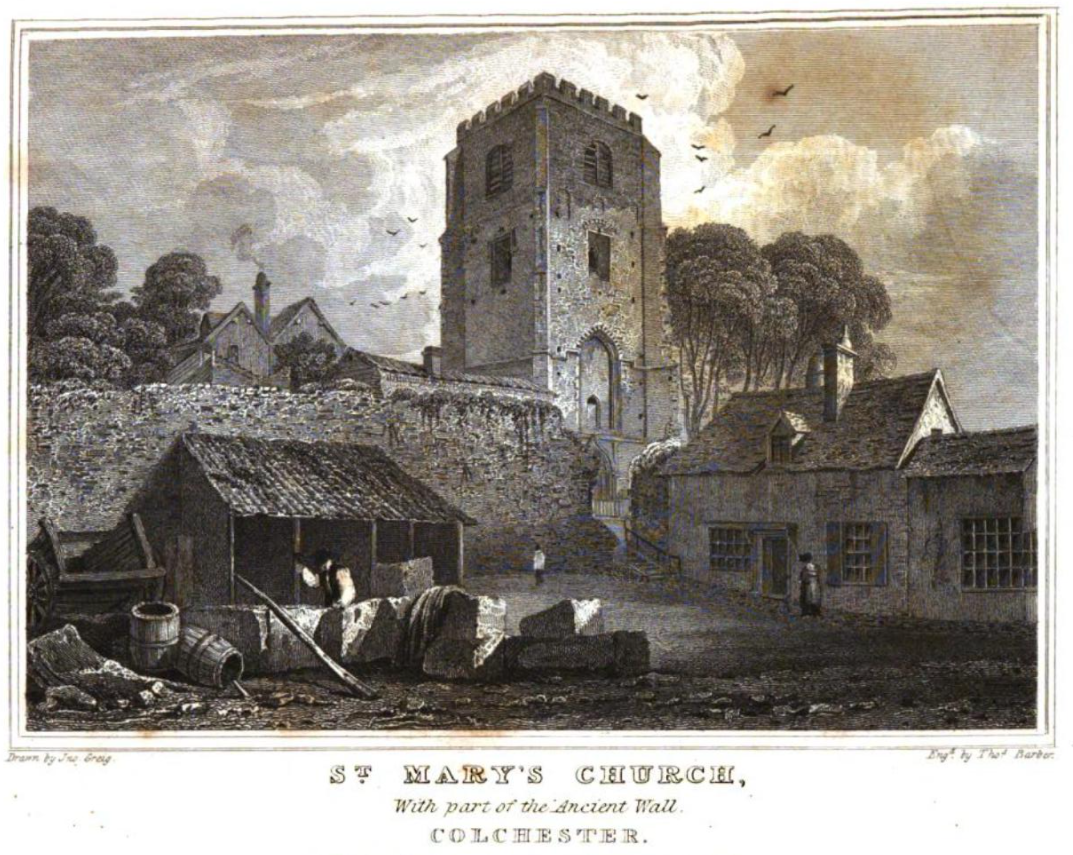
An engraving published in 1826 showing the "heavy and ugly" rebuilt tower of St Mary's and the enlarged postern gate in the wall.

In the aftermath of the siege, the church building was in a ruinous state and although it was initially still used for weddings and baptisms, the congregation held their regular services at the neighbouring church of Holy Trinity until 1714 when St Mary's was rebuilt. The new building, consisting of a small chancel, a nave with aisles and a west gallery, was described by local antiquarian Philip Morant as "plain, neat... but not so substantial as others of its kind". It was designed by John Price of Richmond, Surrey and was completed in only ten months at a cost of £1,154, excluding the cost of furnishings and external paving. A further £65 17s 4d was spent in levelling the churchyard and making gravel paths lined with lime trees which Morant says were "much resorted to" by the locals. At the same time, the ancient "low and inconvenient" postern gate in the Roman wall which gave access to the churchyard was enlarged and stone steps were added. The tower was still a ruin in 1722 when Daniel Defoe visited the town, but it was finally repaired in brick in 1729, although plans to surmount it with a cupola and stone pineapples came to nothing, the rather plain result being described by Morant as "both heavy and ugly as possible".

Morant became the rector in 1737, a post which he held until he died in 1770, although he latterly lived in his second parish at Aldham. Another rector was Thomas Twining from the famous family of tea merchants, who was noted for translating works by Aristotle; he was rector at St Mary's from 1788 until his death in 1804.

=== 19th century rebuilding ===
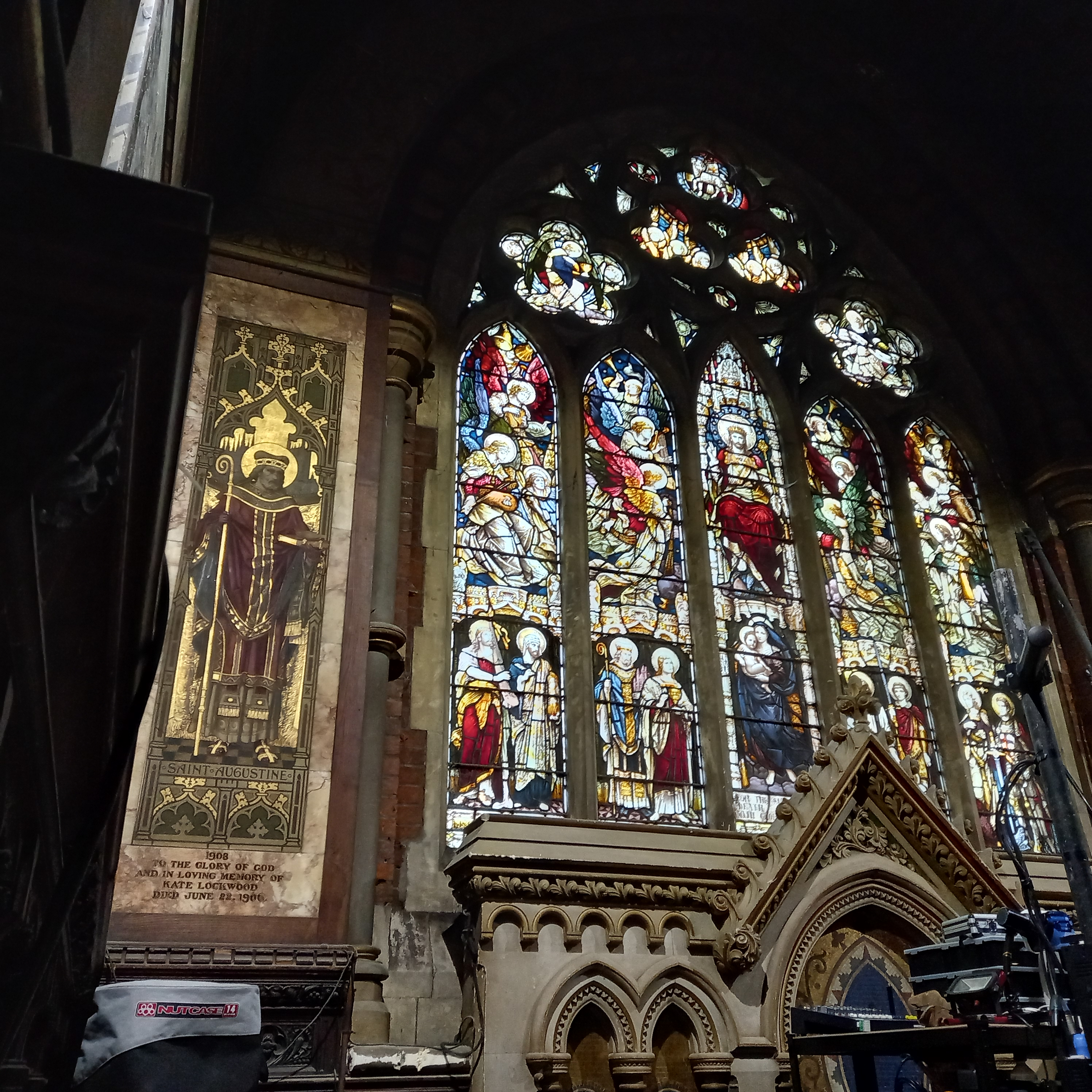
The east window and reredos of Blomfield's 1872 church, with a mural depiction of Saint Alban, now preserved in the backstage area of the Arts Centre.

By 1851, the Sunday services at St Mary's were attended by some 400 people. A new and energetic rector, John William Irvine, (Note: Irvine is also noted for coining the nickname of the Jumbo Water Tower, which was built close to St Mary's rectory in 1882.) was appointed in 1870 and set about the rebuilding of the church to accommodate these large congregations. Starting in 1872, a new chancel and south chapel were built first, and then the rest of the old church buildings, except the tower, were demolished and rebuilt in red and black brick to the design of Arthur Blomfield. The upper part of the tower, which was damaged in the 1884 Colchester earthquake, was rebuilt in 1911, along with the addition of new choir stalls and the cladding of Blomfield's cast iron columns in terra cotta. Subsequent alterations included adding an apse to the south chapel as a war memorial in 1922, a rood mounted on a beam in the south chapel in 1931, new vestries in 1936 and the plastering over of Blomfield's decorative interior brickwork in 1938. St Mary's was made a Grade II listed building in 1950.

=== Redundancy ===
The construction of a ring road around Colchester in the 1970s resulted in Balkerne Hill being converted into a busy dual carriageway, which separated St Mary's from much of its parish. A chapel of ease for St Mary's had been opened in Ireton Road in 1904, which was a corrugated iron building or "tin tabernacle", dedicated to Saint Saviour. This building was replaced by a modern brick and slate church designed by Bryan Thomas, which was dedicated to Christ Church and St Mary on 5 March 1978, and the old church was closed. The only bell from the church, cast in 1679, was put in storage at the Church of St Leonard at the Hythe and was finally installed at St Mary's Church, Prittlewell in 2010 as a Sanctus bell. The pipe organ, originally built in 1881 by A. Hunter & Son, was rebuilt and restored by Percy Daniel & Co of Clevedon and installed at Brentwood Cathedral.

== Arts Centre ==
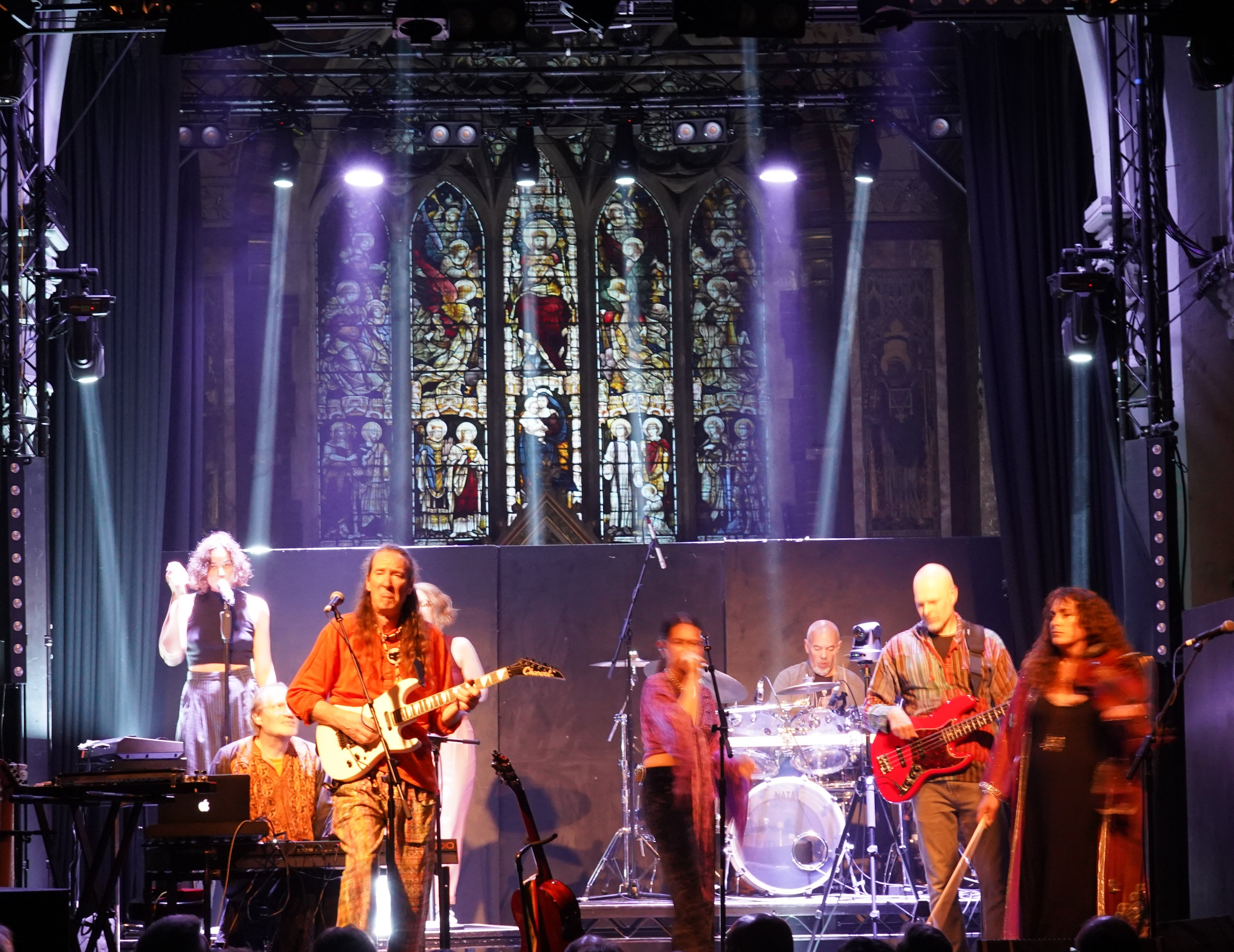
Solstice performing at the venue in 2023

The empty church building was converted to an arts centre, opening its doors in 1980. It is the venue for a variety of artistic, entertainment and community events, including live music, comedy and a regular farmers' market. A focus on emerging talent has resulted in early performances by bands including Coldplay, The Libertines, Ash, The Killers, and The Strokes and comedians Eddie Izzard, Graham Norton, Harry Hill, Catherine Tate, Jo Brand, Bill Bailey, and Jack Dee.

In 2018, Colchester Arts Centre was awarded £499,000 by the Arts Council England for a major refurbishment project to enhance accessibility for deaf and disabled artists and audiences, and to improve energy efficiency and technical infrastructure.

In 2022 the venue’s toilets were renovated featuring mosaics by artist Anne Schwegmann-Fielding. The toilets were nominated for several awards at the annual Loo of the Year Awards in 2023, winning four categories.

Alongside paid staff, events are supported by volunteers acting as front-of-house stewards and serving drinks at the venue’s licensed bars.

== General references ==
- Cromwell, Thomas (1826). History and Description of the Ancient Town and Borough of Colchester in Essex: Volume I. London: W. Simpkin and R. Marshall.
- Cooper, Janet; Elrington, C. R., eds. (1994). A History of the County of Essex: The Borough of Colchester. Vol. IX. London: Victoria County History. ISBN 978-0-19-722784-8.
- Defoe, Daniel (1888). Tour through the Eastern counties of England, 1722. London: Cassell & Company Ltd.
- Denny, Patrick (2015). Colchester History Tour. Stroud, Gloucestershire: Amberley Publishing. ISBN 978-1445646251.
- Jones, Phil (2003). The Siege of Colchester, 1648. Stroud, Gloucestershire: Tempus Publishing Ltd. ISBN 0752425528.
- Leach, A. F. (2007). The Schools of Medieval England. London: Routledge. ISBN 978-0415432542.
- Martin, George Haward (March 1947). "The History of Colchester Royal Grammar School". The Colcestrian (131): 3–38.
- Morant, Philip (1789). The History and Antiquities of Colchester, in the County of Essex. Colchester: J. Fenno.
- Osbourne, Mike (2013). Defending Essex. Stroud, Gloucestershire: The History Press. ISBN 978-0752488349.
- Pevsner, Nikolaus; Radcliffe, Enid (1965). The Buildings of England: Essex. London: Penguin Books. ISBN 0140710116.
- Radford, David; Gascoyne, Adrian; Wise, Philip, eds. (2013). Colchester, Fortress of the War God: An Archaeological Assessment. Oxford: Oxbow Books. ISBN 978-1-84217-508-8.
