= Colne Valley (disambiguation) =

Colne Valley is a valley in West Yorkshire.

Colne Valley may also refer to:

- Colne Valley (UK Parliament constituency), the constituency of this name in the West Yorkshire valley
- Colne Valley, Essex,
- Colne Valley Railway, a heritage railway located in the Essex Valley
- the valley of the River Colne, Hertfordshire
- Colne Valley Regional Park, a park located in Buckinghamshire and other counties
