= Colne Valley, Essex =

Nature reserve in Essex, England

Coordinates: 51.932°N 0.7098°E

Colne Valley
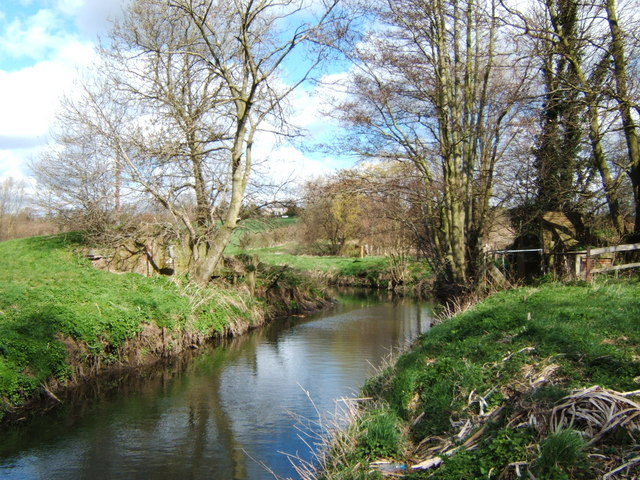
- The River Colne with the remains of a railway bridge on the right at the west end of the nature reserve
- Interactive map of Colne Valley
- Type: Local Nature Reserve
- Location: Earls Colne, Essex
- OS grid: TL 864 294
- Area: 5.1 hectares (13 acres)
- Manager: Colchester Borough Council

Colne Valley is a 5.1 hectare Local Nature Reserve north and east of Earls Colne in Essex. It is owned and managed by Colchester Borough Council.

The site is a linear strip along the route of the former Colne Valley and Halstead Railway, which has been converted to wildflower meadows. There are otters, bats, stag beetles and birds.

There is access from Colne Park Road in White Colne, which crosses the site.
