= Colne Valley Railway =

Heritage railway in Essex, England

- Castle Hedingham station on the Colne Valley Railway
- Coordinates: 51.9966°N 0.5798°E

Commercial operations
- Built by: Colne Valley and Halstead Railway
- Original gauge: 4 ft 8 1/2 in (1,435 mm) standard gauge

Preserved operations
- Preserved gauge: 4 ft 8 1/2 in (1,435 mm) standard gauge

Commercial history
- Opened: 1861/1863
- Closed: 1961 Passenger traffic 1965 Freight traffic

Preservation history
- 1973: land purchase
- 1974: Preservation Society formed
- Headquarters: Castle Hedingham Station

The Colne Valley Railway is a heritage railway based at Castle Hedingham Station, near Halstead in Essex, England. The railway consists of a 1 mile (1.6 km) long running line, with a fully reconstructed station, signal box and railway yard.

== History ==
The railway occupies part of the former Colne Valley and Halstead Railway (CVHR), which opened in stages between 16 April 1860 and 10 May 1863. This part of the railway was a through line from Birdbrook to Wakes Colne.

The line closed on 1 January 1962, when all passenger and freight traffic between Haverhill and Yeldham ended. On 19 April 1965, all transiting freight traffic ended. The line was dismantled and infrastructure demolished or recovered by contractors a year later, and the land on which the heritage railway station now sits resold to a local landowner.

== Preservation ==
The site was acquired from the landowner in 1973 and the Colne Valley Railway Company Limited formed to operate the railway. A volunteers' supporters body, the Colne Valley Railway Preservation Society (CVRPS), was formed in 1974. Although originally a main line railway, the track and infrastructure was taken up in the late 60s, so on acquisition there was no remaining infrastructure onsite. The original Sible and Castle Hedingham station 1 mile (1.6 km) away and was taken down carefully brick by brick, the bricks numbered, and the structure transported to the new site and subsequently reconstructed. The timber top half (first floor) of the signal box came from Cressing, remounted on a new higher (ground floor) brick base. The bridge crossing the River Colne came from Earls Colne in 1982.

The first steam locomotive to arrive on site was Hunslet "Austerity" 0-6-0ST No.WD190 shortly followed by No.72. Members of the CVRPS began to operate the locomotives on a short section of line. Despite its still short length, presently the CVR is home to three ex-mainline steam locomotives.

As early as August 1978, it was reported that the railway was proposing an extension to the line. According to the Railway Magazine:

It is proposed that this will start at the CVR present terminus at the Drawell Pumping Station, then cross the A604 road by an overbridge and continue along the existing trackbed to the site of the former Great Yeldham Station yard, where a new station and yard would be reconstructed. The line would then continue for a further quarter-mile towards Stambourne.

== Closure threat ==
CVR Company Limited was acquired by Australian businessman Christopher Young in 2005. The CVRPS agreed a five-year renegotiable lease to take over the operation of the railway for the 2006 season. In 2014, when the 5-year lease expires on 31 December 2015, Young offered the CVRPS the option of buying the site's freehold. The CVRPS pursued sufficient funds and loans to complete the terms by December 2015, but were told that Young's plans had changed.

The CVRPS were informed at their annual general meeting on 22 March 2015 that CVR Co. Ltd. had decided the railway no longer featured in future plans for the site and planning permission would be sought for redevelopment of the site, which lies in a conservation area – a subsequent Freedom of Information request by local media discovered that outline planning permission had been sought for 600 houses on the station. The CVRPS were served notice that operations must cease after 31 December 2015, with the CVRPS having to remove all its rolling stock and buildings during 2016, with possibility of relocation to another heritage railway.

In June 2015, it was announced by Steam Railway magazine that a new site adjacent to the current one had been procured. Permission was being sought from CVR Co. Ltd. to operate as normal during 2016, with the railway operating from the new site from 2017. A new station would be constructed at each end of the line, which would extend to 1 mile 4 chains (1.69 km). Later that month, it was announced by Steam Railway magazine that the proposed new site was "no longer viable" due to reasons that were not disclosed.

In September 2015, CVRPS was formally converted into a charity called Colne Valley Railway Preservation Ltd. (CVRPL).

On 6 December 2016 CVRPL announced that the railway, on its original site, was now safe and the site purchased from CVR Co. Ltd. as a result of obtaining a Heritage Lottery Fund grant for £1.75m along with support from Braintree District Council.

== Locomotives and rolling stock ==
=== Steam locomotives ===
Origin	Wheel arrangement	Class	Notes	Photograph
LMS	4-6-0	Class 5MT	No. 45293, built 1936. Under restoration as of 2026.	
SR	4-6-2	Merchant Navy Class	No. 35010 Blue Star, built 1942. Under external restoration.	
Hunslet	0-6-0ST	Austerity	No. WD190, built in 1952. Out of service.	
Hunslet	0-6-0ST	Austerity	No. WD200, built in 1953. Under restoration/overhaul.	
Hawthorne Leslie	0-4-0ST		No. 1, built in 1928. Static Exhibit.	
RSH	0-6-0ST	56	No. 60 Jupiter, built in 1950. Under restoration/ overhaul.	

=== Diesel & Electric Locomotives ===
Origin	Wheel arrangement	Class	Notes	Photograph
BR	0-6-0DM	Class 03	No. D2041, Built 1959. operational.	
BR	0-6-0DM	Class 03	No. D2184, Built 1962. operational.	
BR	0-6-0DM	Class 03	No. D2046, Built 1968. Under Restoration.	
BR	0-6-0DM	Class 08	No. 08706. operational.	
Ruston & Hornsby	4wDM	88DS	No.887 (No. 3940009), Built 1955, Operational.	
Hibberd	0-4-0DM		No. 4007, Built 1947. Stored out of use.	
Lake and Elliot	4wd	Fordson Major	No. 1 "Henry", operational	
Robert Stephenson & Hawthorns	Bo-BoBE		No.7284 "Doug Tottman" (Heysham Power Station No. 1) Operational but stored out of use.	

=== Diesel multiple unit ===
Origin	Class	Notes	Photograph
BR	Class 121	No. 55033, built in 1960, operational	

=== Electric multiple units ===
Origin	Class	Notes	Photograph
BR	Class 307	No. 75023 (DT). Built 1955. Stored out of use.	
BR	Class 308	No. 75881 (DTCoL). has the London Underground Victoria Line Cobourg Street signalling centre display inside.	
BR	Class 312	No. 78037 (DTCoL). Stored out of use.	
BR	Class 312	No. 71205 (TSO). Stored out of use.	

=== HSTs ===
Origin	Class	Notes	Photograph
BR	Class 43	No. 43023, Under Restoration.	
BR	Class 43	No. 43071, built in 1977, operational.	
BR	Class 43	No. 43073, built in 1978, operational.	
BR	Class 43	No. 43082, built in 1978, operational.	
BR	Class 43	No. 43165, Under Restoration.	

=== Coaches ===
Origin	Class	Notes	Photograph
BR	DVT	No. 82121, Stored out of use.	
BR	MK3 TRFB	No. 40706, Operational.	
BR	MK3 TGS	No. 44058, Operational.	
BR	MK3 TFO	No. 41088, Operational.	
