= Earls Colne railway station =

Former railway station in England

Coordinates: 51.9356°N 0.6879°E

Earls Colne
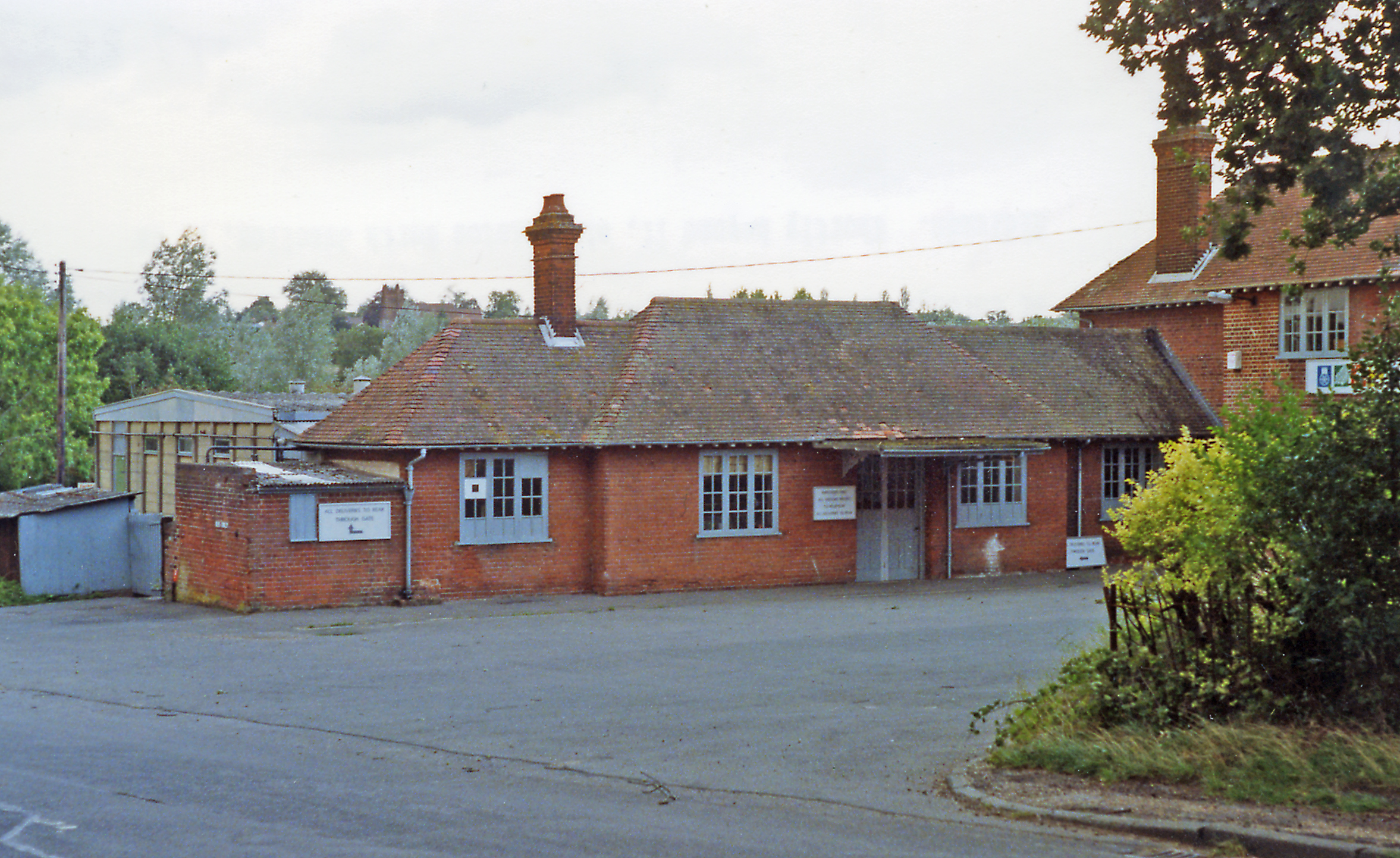
- The former station in 1992

General information
- Location: Earls Colne, Braintree; England
- Platforms: 1

Other information
- Status: Disused

History
- Original company: Colne Valley and Halstead Railway
- Pre-grouping: Colne Valley and Halstead Railway
- Post-grouping: London and North Eastern Railway

Key dates
- 1882: Opened as Ford Gate
- 1 May 1889: Renamed Colne
- 1 May 1905: Renamed Earls Colne
- 1 Jan 1962: Closed for passengers
- 28 December 1964: closed for freight
Location

Earls Colne railway station was located in Earls Colne, Essex. It was 53 miles 77 chains (86.84 km) from London Liverpool Street via Marks Tey.

Preceding station	Disused railways	Following station
Halstead	Colne Valley and Halstead Railway	White Colne
