= Colne (disambiguation) =

Colne is a town in Lancashire, England.

Colne may also refer to:

== Villages ==
- Colne, Cambridgeshire, England
- The Colnes, four villages in northern Essex, England based around the local river
  - Colne Engaine
  - Earls Colne
  - Wakes Colne
  - White Colne

== Rivers ==
- River Colne, Essex, England
- River Colne, Hertfordshire, England
- River Colne, West Yorkshire, England

== Organisations ==
- Colne F.C., a football club from Colne in Lancashire
- Colne Dynamoes F.C., a defunct football club from the same town

== Other uses ==
- Colne Valley (UK Parliament constituency)
- Nelson and Colne (UK Parliament constituency)
- SS Colne, a freight vessel

== See also ==
- Kolnes, a village in Norway
