= Listed buildings in Great Yeldham =

Historic structures in Essex, England

Great Yeldham is a village and civil parish in the Braintree District of Essex, England. It contains 41 listed buildings that are recorded in the National Heritage List for England. Of these one is grade I, two are grade II* and 38 are grade II.

This list is based on the information retrieved online from Historic England.

== Key ==
Grade	Criteria
I	Buildings that are of exceptional interest
II*	Particularly important buildings of more than special interest
II	Buildings that are of special interest

== Listing ==
Name	Grade	Location	Type	Completed (Note: The date given is the date used by Historic England as significant for the initial building or that of an important part in the structure's description.)	Date designated	Grid ref. (Note: The grid reference is based on the British national grid reference system, sometimes known as OSGB36, used by the Ordnance Survey.) Geo-coordinates	Notes	Entry number (Note: The "List Entry Number" is a unique number assigned to each listed building and scheduled monument by Historic England.)	Image	Wikidata
Barn Approximately 20 Metres North West of Butler's Farmhouse	II				29 August 1984	TL7705237704; 52°00′34″N 0°34′42″E		1123007	Upload Photo	Q26416102
Numbers 2 and 3, Blossom Cottage and the Delves	II	2, Bridge Street			27 July 1992	TL7607738422; 52°00′59″N 0°33′52″E		1234332	Upload Photo	Q26527748
Oak House	II	Bridge Street			21 June 1962	TL7600038395; 52°00′58″N 0°33′48″E		1123008	Upload Photo	Q26416103
Spayne's Hall	II	Cherry Lane			7 August 1952	TL7629738126; 52°00′49″N 0°34′03″E		1123009	Upload Photo	Q26416104
Applegates	II	Church Road			19 September 1980	TL7587638624; 52°01′05″N 0°33′42″E		1164916	Upload Photo	Q26458422
Barn Approximately 65 Metres South East of Great Yeldham Hall	II	Church Road			29 August 1984	TL7577738510; 52°01′02″N 0°33′37″E		1123012	Upload Photo	Q26416106
Byre Approximately 30 Metres South of Great Yeldham Hall	II	Church Road			29 August 1984	TL7574938545; 52°01′03″N 0°33′35″E		1123011	Upload Photo	Q26416105
Change House	II	Church Road			7 August 1952	TL7571838812; 52°01′12″N 0°33′34″E		1338031	Upload Photo	Q26622380
Dovecote Approximately 100 Metres South East of Great Yeldham Hall	II	Church Road			7 August 1952	TL7581838496; 52°01′01″N 0°33′39″E		1164914	Upload Photo	Q26458420
Granary/cartlodge Approximately 50 Metres South East of Great Yeldham Hall	II	Church Road			29 August 1984	TL7577238527; 52°01′02″N 0°33′36″E		1164907	Upload Photo	Q26458414
Great Yeldham Hall	II	Church Road			7 August 1952	TL7575038579; 52°01′04″N 0°33′35″E		1338030	Upload Photo	Q26622379
Parish Church of St Andrew	I	Church Road	church building		21 June 1962	TL7577838667; 52°01′07″N 0°33′37″E		1123010	Parish Church of St Andrew More images	Q17535849
The Old Rectory	II*	Church Road			7 August 1952	TL7572738653; 52°01′06″N 0°33′34″E		1338029	Upload Photo	Q17557919
Lovington's Farmhouse	II	Dicketts Hill			21 June 1962	TL7648536879; 52°00′08″N 0°34′11″E		1123013	Upload Photo	Q26416107
Old Drawwell Cottage	II	Dicketts Hill			29 August 1984	TL7687836345; 51°59′51″N 0°34′30″E		1164944	Upload Photo	Q26458446
Old Post Office Cottages	II	1 and 2, High Street			1 January 1952	TL7615638092; 52°00′48″N 0°33′56″E		1317520	Upload Photo	Q26603743
Oak House	II	High Street, CO9 4EX			29 August 1984	TL7612938169; 52°00′50″N 0°33′54″E		1123014	Upload Photo	Q26416108
Outhouse 10 Metres East of Old Post Office Cottages	II	High Street			29 August 1984	TL7616938091; 52°00′48″N 0°33′56″E		1338033	Upload Photo	Q26622382
The Limes	II	High Street			21 June 1962	TL7607638132; 52°00′49″N 0°33′52″E		1164956	Upload Photo	Q26458458
The Waggon and Horses Public House	II	High Street	pub		1 May 1980	TL7608638169; 52°00′50″N 0°33′52″E		1338032	The Waggon and Horses Public House More images	Q26622381
Numbers 1 and 2 Thatched Cottages and St Crispins	II	1 and 2 Thatched Cottages, Leather Lane			20 February 1978	TL7615938445; 52°00′59″N 0°33′56″E		1164994	Upload Photo	Q26458490
The Three Bottles Public House	II	Leather Lane	pub		21 June 1962	TL7612238424; 52°00′59″N 0°33′54″E		1123015	The Three Bottles Public House More images	Q26416109
Bowyers , Lime Cottage and Primrose Cottage	II	North Road			29 August 1984	TL7607038457; 52°01′00″N 0°33′52″E		1123016	Upload Photo	Q26416110
Turners House	II	North Road			28 September 1984	TL7606038544; 52°01′03″N 0°33′51″E		1338034	Upload Photo	Q26622383
Westwoods	II	North Road			29 August 1984	TL7605138494; 52°01′01″N 0°33′51″E		1317533	Upload Photo	Q26603755
Barn Approximately 25 Metres North West of Poole House	II	Poole Street			29 August 1984	TL7640137038; 52°00′14″N 0°34′07″E		1338035	Upload Photo	Q26622384
Cooksferry Farmhouse	II	Poole Street			16 February 1976	TL7638837270; 52°00′21″N 0°34′06″E		1123018	Upload Photo	Q26416111
Poole House	II	Poole Street			21 June 1962	TL7644237010; 52°00′13″N 0°34′09″E		1317506	Upload Photo	Q26603730
Spillings	II	Poole Street			28 September 1984	TL7616537909; 52°00′42″N 0°33′56″E		1165018	Upload Photo	Q26458519
The Rookery	II	Poole Street			21 June 1962	TL7620237823; 52°00′39″N 0°33′58″E		1165031	Upload Photo	Q26458533
The White Hart Public House	II*	Poole Street	pub		7 August 1952	TL7617637753; 52°00′37″N 0°33′56″E		1123017	The White Hart Public House More images	Q17557251
Barn Approximately 20 Metres North East of Gunce's Farmhouse	II	Stambourne Road			28 September 1984	TL7413638403; 52°01′00″N 0°32′10″E		1165061	Upload Photo	Q26458564
Borley's Farmhouse	II	Stambourne Road			29 August 1984	TL7378539128; 52°01′24″N 0°31′53″E		1123019	Upload Photo	Q26416112
Gunces Farmhouse	II	Stambourne Road			7 August 1952	TL7412538371; 52°00′59″N 0°32′10″E		1338036	Upload Photo	Q26622385
Mans Cross House	II	Stambourne Road			29 August 1984	TL7522638922; 52°01′16″N 0°33′08″E		1123020	Upload Photo	Q26416113
Weybridge Farmhouse	II	Stambourne Road			29 August 1984	TL7358339139; 52°01′25″N 0°31′43″E		1165043	Upload Photo	Q26458547
Brook Farmhouse	II	Tilbury Road			7 August 1952	TL7615339048; 52°01′19″N 0°33′57″E		1337998	Upload Photo	Q26622350
Spencer Grange	II	Tilbury Road			29 August 1984	TL7589239387; 52°01′30″N 0°33′44″E		1317483	Upload Photo	Q26603711
Tweed Cottage	II	Tilbury Road			29 August 1984	TL7597338766; 52°01′10″N 0°33′47″E		1165086	Upload Photo	Q26458586
Potter's Hall	II	Toppesfield Road			29 August 1984	TL7572437749; 52°00′37″N 0°33′32″E		1165093	Upload Photo	Q26458592
Scotneys Farmhouse	II	Toppesfield Road			29 August 1984	TL7541437523; 52°00′30″N 0°33′16″E		1123021	Upload Photo	Q26416114

== See also ==
- Grade I listed buildings in Essex
- Grade II* listed buildings in Essex

== Sources ==
- Bettley, James; Pevsner, Nikolaus (2007) [1954], Essex, The Buildings of England, New Haven and London: Yale University Press, ISBN 978-0-300-11614-4
