= Whitley railway station =

Former railway station in England

Whitley

General information
- Location: Birdbrook, Braintree; England
- Coordinates: 52°02′37″N 0°30′22″E

Other information
- Status: Disused

History
- Original company: Colne Valley and Halstead Railway

Key dates
- 26 May 1862: Opened
- 10 May 1863: Closed
Location

Whitley railway station was a temporary station on the former Colne Valley and Halstead Railway, three-quarters of a mile (1.2 km) to the east of the village of Birdbrook, Essex. It opened in 1862 and closed in October 1863 when it was replaced by Birdbrook station.

Preceding station	Disused railways	Following station
Birdbrook	Colne Valley and Halstead Railway	Yeldham
