= Halstead railway station =

Former railway station in England

Coordinates: 51.9435°N 0.6337°E

Halstead
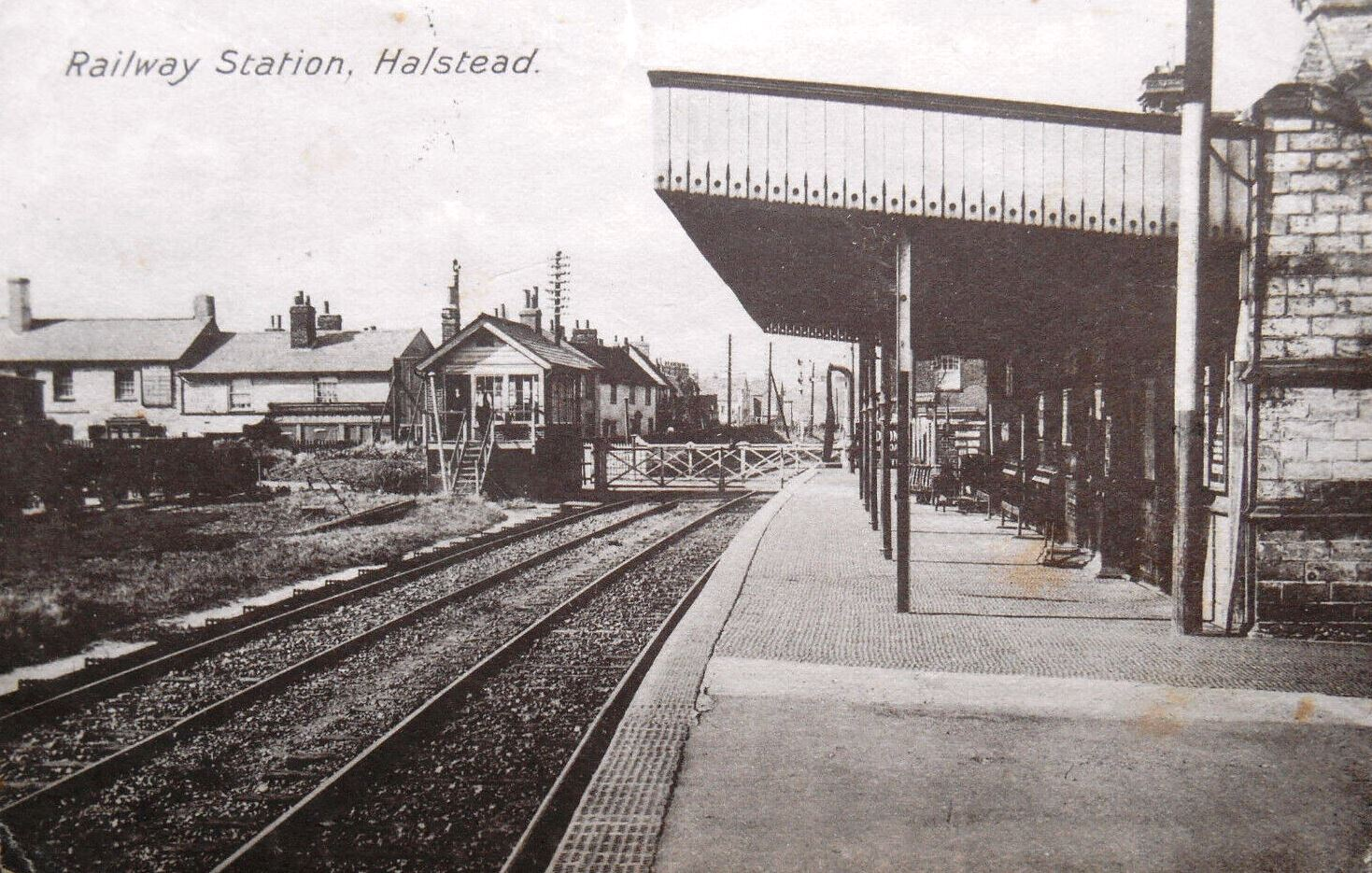

General information
- Location: Halstead, Braintree; England
- Platforms: 1

Other information
- Status: Disused

History
- Original company: Colne Valley and Halstead Railway
- Pre-grouping: Colne Valley and Halstead Railway
- Post-grouping: London and North Eastern Railway

Key dates
- 16 Apr 1860: Opened
- 1 Jan 1962: Closed for passengers
- 19 April 1965: closed for freight
Location

Halstead railway station was located in Halstead, Essex. It was 56 miles 34 chains (90.81 km) from London Liverpool Street via Marks Tey. It closed in 1962. The station was demolished after closure and the site has been redeveloped leaving no trace of its existence.

Preceding station	Disused railways	Following station
Sible and Castle Hedingham	Colne Valley and Halstead Railway	Earls Colne
