= White Colne railway station =

Former railway station in England

Coordinates: 51.929°N 0.7191°E

White Colne

General information
- Location: White Colne, Braintree; England
- Platforms: 1

Other information
- Status: Disused

History
- Original company: Colne Valley and Halstead Railway
- Pre-grouping: Colne Valley and Halstead Railway
- Post-grouping: London and North Eastern Railway

Key dates
- 16 Apr 1860: Opened as Colne
- 1 May 1889: Closed
- 1 Apr 1908: Reopened as White Colne
- 1 Jan 1962: Closed for passengers
- 28 December 1964: closed for freight
Location

White Colne railway station was located in White Colne, Essex. It was 52 miles 38 chains (84.45 km) from London Liverpool Street via Marks Tey.

Preceding station	Disused railways	Following station
Earls Colne	Colne Valley and Halstead Railway	Chappel and Wakes Colne
