= Sible and Castle Hedingham railway station =

Former railway station in England

Coordinates: 51.9821°N 0.5913°E

Sible and Castle Hedingham

General information
- Location: Sible Hedingham, Braintree; England
- Platforms: 1

Other information
- Status: Disused

History
- Original company: Colne Valley and Halstead Railway
- Pre-grouping: Colne Valley and Halstead Railway
- Post-grouping: London and North Eastern Railway

Key dates
- 1 Jul 1861: Opened as Castle Hedingham
- Sep 1867: Renamed; Sible and Castle Hedingham
- 1 Jan 1962: Closed for passengers
- 13 July 1964: closed for freight
Location

Sible and Castle Hedingham railway station was a station in Sible Hedingham, Essex. It was 59 miles 56 chains (96.08 km) from London Liverpool Street via Marks Tey. It closed for passengers in 1962. Dismantled brick by brick, it was relocated and reconstructed about 1 mile (1.6 km) to the north, renamed Castle Hedingham and serves as the HQ for the Colne Valley Railway heritage railway, which started operations in 1973.

| Preceding station | Disused railways | Following station |
|---|---|---|
| Yeldham | Colne Valley and Halstead Railway | Halstead |
