= Birdbrook railway station =

Disused railway station in Birdbrook, Essex, England

Coordinates: 52°02′59″N 0°30′03″E

Birdbrook
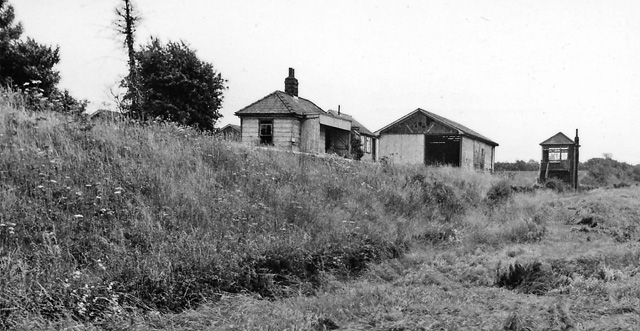
- View in 1962

General information
- Location: Birdbrook, Braintree; England
- Platforms: 1

Other information
- Status: Disused

History
- Original company: Colne Valley and Halstead Railway
- Pre-grouping: Colne Valley and Halstead Railway
- Post-grouping: London and North Eastern Railway

Key dates
- 10 May 1863: Opened
- 1 Jan 1962: Closed
Location

Birdbrook railway station was located 0.7 miles (1.1 km) to the northeast of the village of Birdbrook, Essex. It was 65 miles 74 chains (106.10 km; 65.93 mi) from London Liverpool Street via Marks Tey. It opened in 1863 as the replacement for Whitley station, and closed in 1962.

Former Services

| Preceding station | Disused railways | Following station |
|---|---|---|
| Haverhill South; Line and station closed | Colne Valley and Halstead Railway to 1924 | Whitley; Line and station closed |
| Haverhill North; Line and station closed | London and North Eastern Railway; Colne Valley and Halstead line 1924 on | Whitley; Line and station closed |
