= River Colne, Essex =

River in Essex, England

Colne
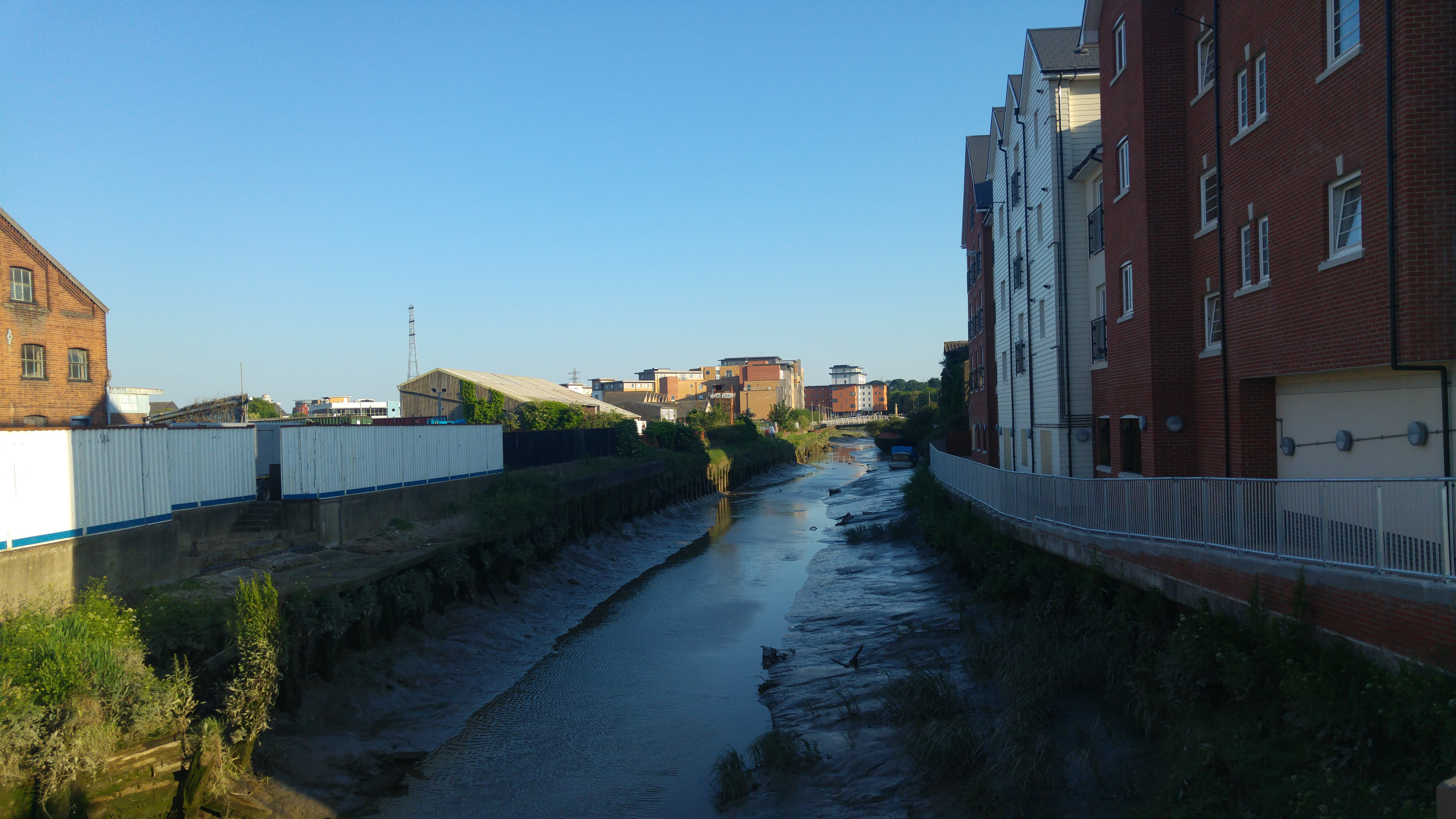
- The River Colne in Colchester, looking south

Location
- Country: England
- Region: Essex
- City: Colchester

Physical characteristics
- Source
  - location: near Cornish Hall End
  - coordinates: 52.0144°N 0.4387°E
  - elevation: 104 m (341 ft)
- Mouth: North Sea
  - location: Brightlingsea
  - coordinates: 51.8007°N 1.0102°E
  - elevation: 0 m (0 ft)
- Length: 62 km (39 mi)

The River Colne ( /koʊn/ or /koʊln/) is a small river that runs through Essex, England and passes through Colchester. It is not a tributary of any other river, instead having an estuary that joins the sea near Brightlingsea. The river's name is of Celtic origin, combining the word for rock "cal" with a remnant of the word "afon", or river, giving the meaning "stony river". However, another authority states that the river's name was originally Colonia Fluvius, the "waterway of the Colonia": a reference to Colchester's status in Roman times. There are two other rivers in the UK that share the same name.

== Sources ==
Two of the Colne's tributaries start near the villages of Stambourne Green and Birdbrook in Essex, before converging in Great Yeldham. A longer tributary, however, starts to the north-west of Cornish Hall End, flowing into the other sources just south of Great Yeldham. The river then flows south-east through Sible Hedingham, Halstead, Earls Colne, Colne Engaine, White Colne, Chappel and Ford Street before reaching Colchester.

Between Great Yeldham and Wakes Colne, the course of the river is followed by the route of the former Colne Valley and Halstead Railway which ran from Haverhill before closing to passenger traffic in 1961. A mile of the route around Castle Hedingham is preserved as the Colne Valley Railway.

== In Colchester ==
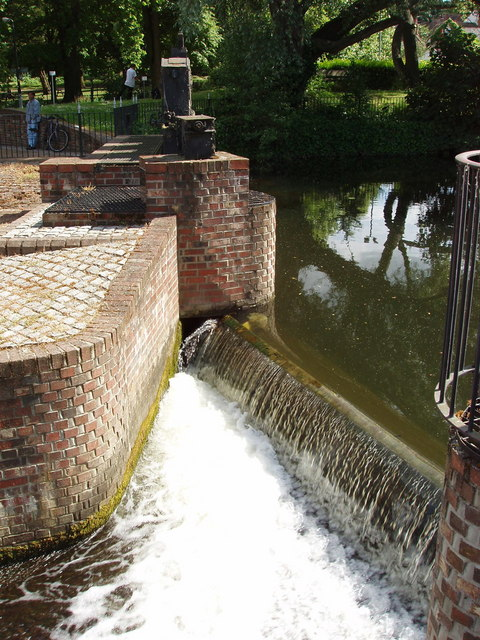
Middlemill weir, in the centre of Colchester

The Colne Valley has a flood plain approximately 300 metres in width by the time it enters Colchester. This area is used as pasture because the river at this stage has no safeguards against it rising the two feet it needs to burst its banks, although it is split between two pasture areas in Spring Lane, Old Lexden. Somewhat to the south of Colchester North railway station, the river passes under a bridge and into a concrete-lined area that was used as an open-air bathing facility until the 1970s, and is now used by canoeists.

It then meanders under a road bridge at the bottom of North Hill, and tumbles down a weir used for discharge control at Middlemill, the site of a now-demolished mill. It forms the border of Colchester's Castle Park and the cricket ground, and footbridges cross it to provide access from the town centre to residential areas on the north side of the flood plain, which occasionally floods should the river rise too much. The river encircles one side of a small lake, and then turns south-east, and then south, before falling over a large weir and becoming tidal.

== After Colchester ==
Beyond this point, the river shows significant mud banks at low tide, and flows through the Hythe, past the University of Essex campus, and then through the village of Rowhedge, where it is attributed to by the Roman River. It continues past the town of Wivenhoe and the Colne Barrier and down to Brightlingsea. Downstream from the barrier, the Colne is marked by navigation buoys.

== Situation ==
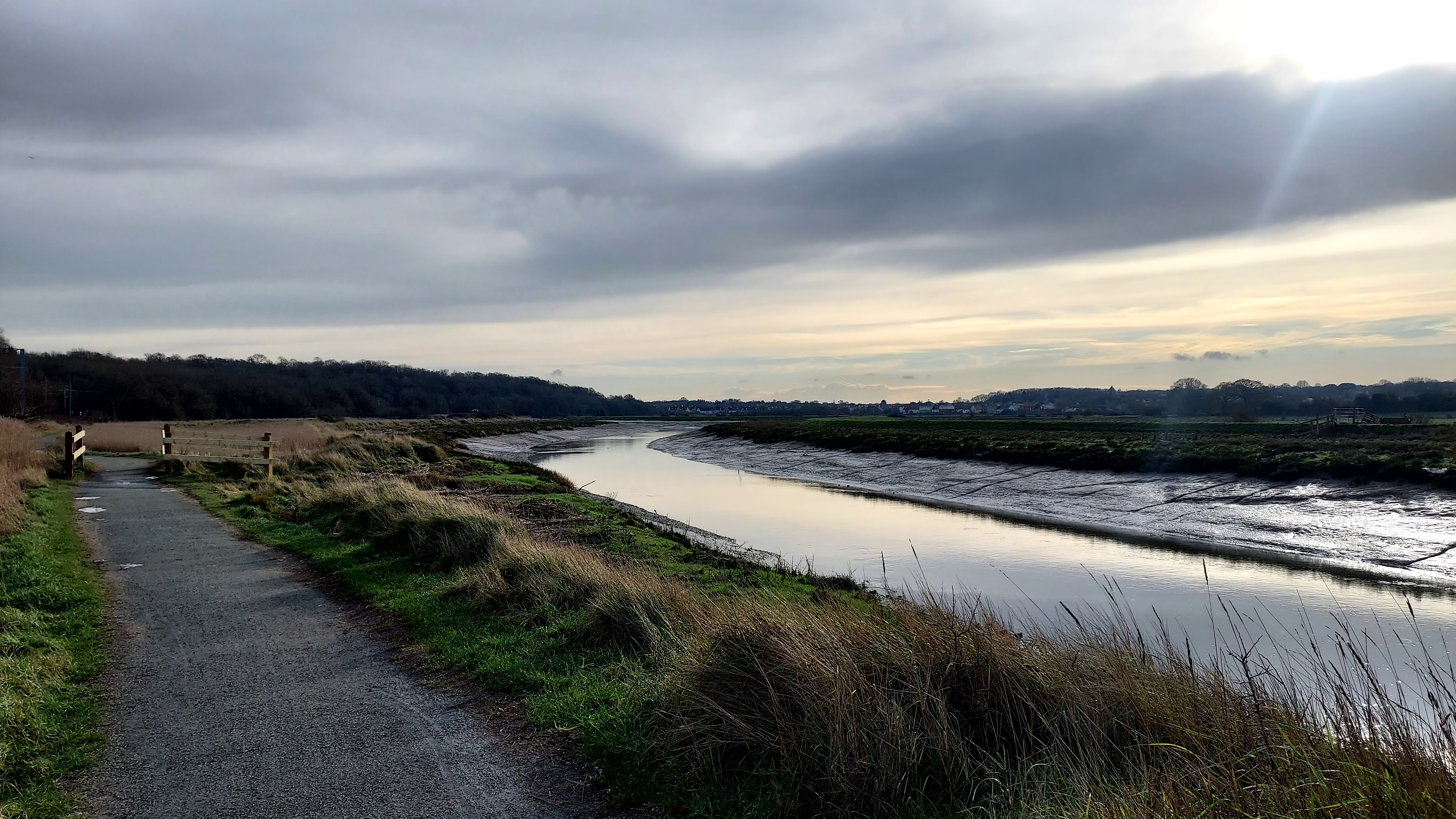
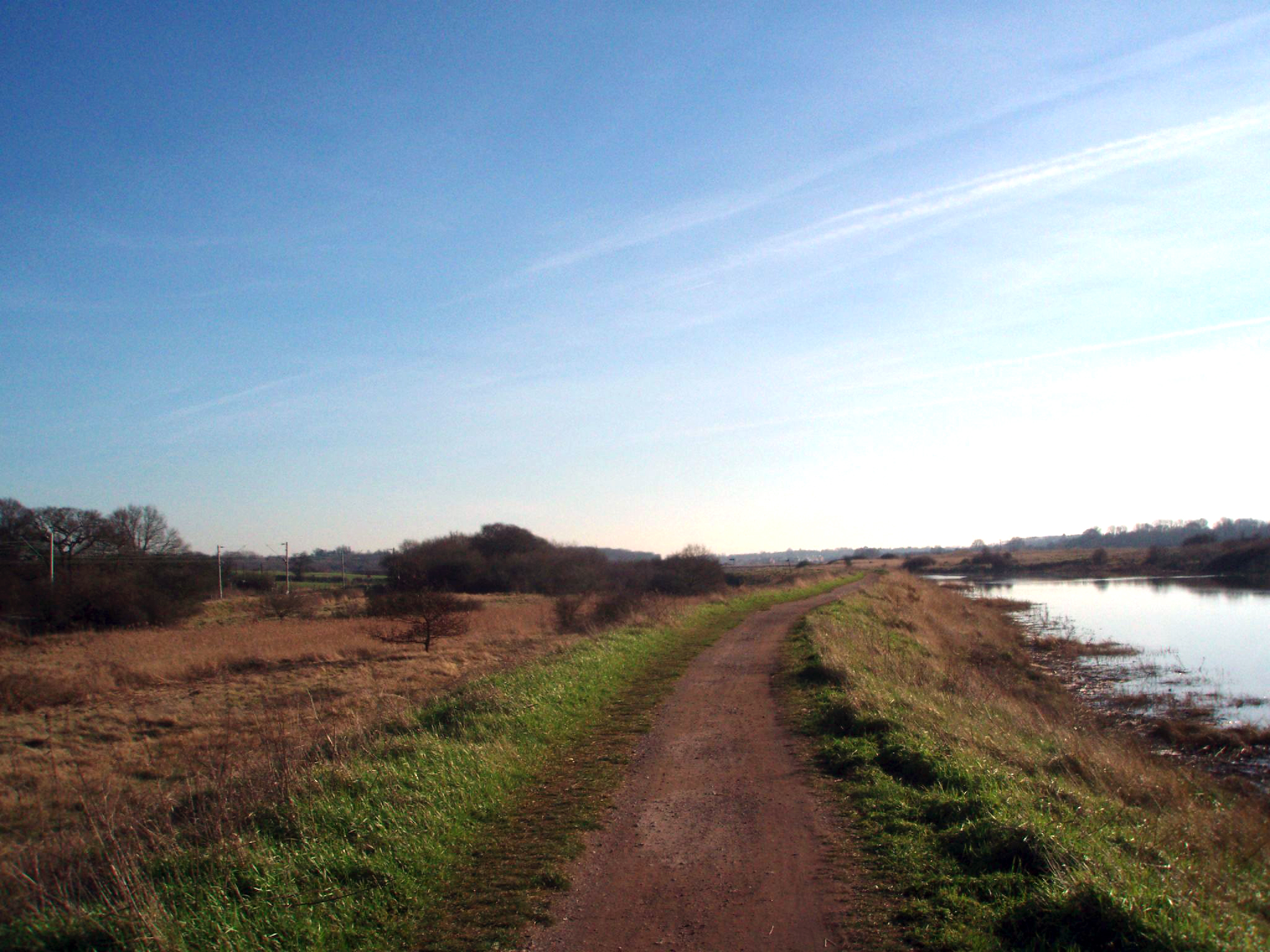
Route 51 between Colchester and Wivenhoe

The banks of the Colne frequently incorporate pillboxes dating from the Second World War, particularly close to navigable crossings.

From Castle Park to Wivenhoe Railway Station, National Cycle Network Route 51 roughly follows the course of the Colne. This is a mixture of tarmac-surfaced shared-use paths, a short tarmac/gravel-surfaced area and, once out of the urban area of Colchester, a hard dirt path on the north levee of the river that passes the Hythe and the university all the way to Wivenhoe.

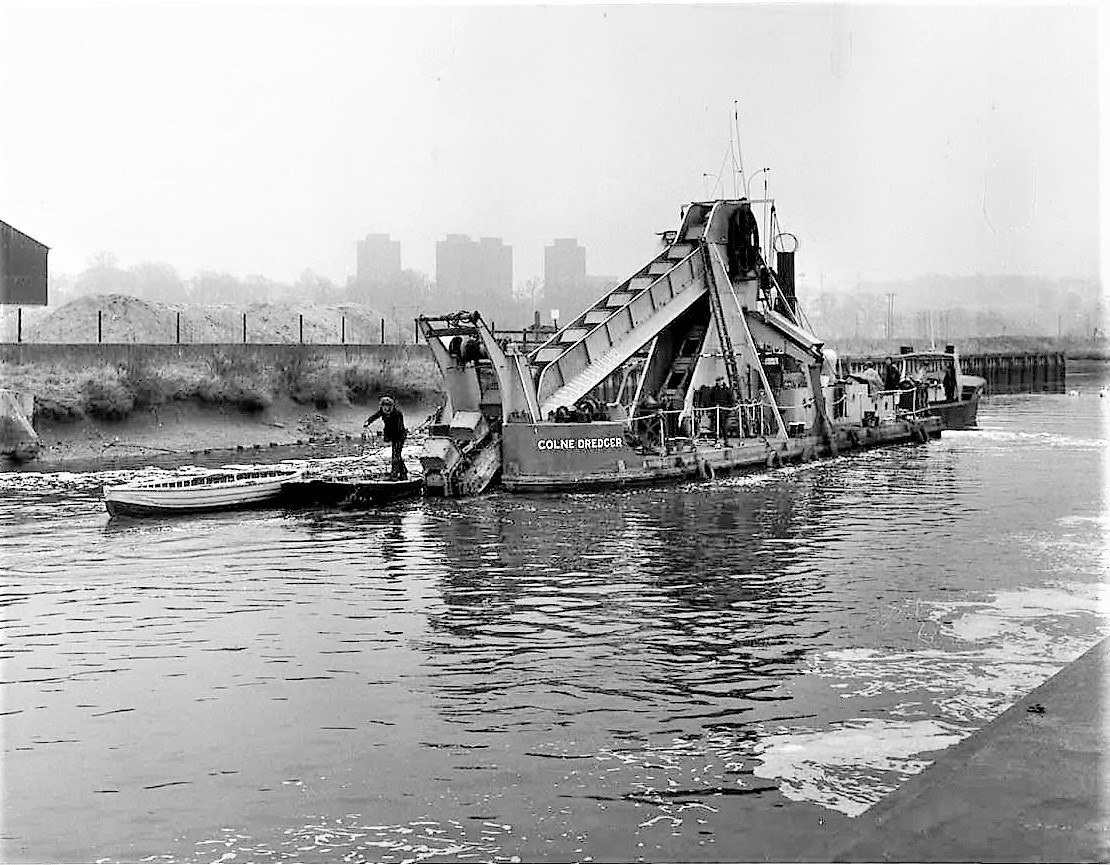
Colne Dredger, one of the last remaining steam dredgers in the UK, at work.

The Hythe area of Colchester, through which the Colne flows, was, from Roman times, a small port that supplied the town. However, the river is no longer deep enough to support ships large enough to make this viable, and water trade is now non-existent. Victorian-era plans to dredge the river once more ultimately failed.

The River Colne has been polluted by sewage works after changes in regulations, along with many other waterways in the United Kingdom. This has caused moderate uproar in the surrounding communities, who like to swim in the river, and they are also concerned about the impact on wildlife.
