= Fordstreet =

Village in Essex, England

Coordinates: 51.9074°N 0.7908°E

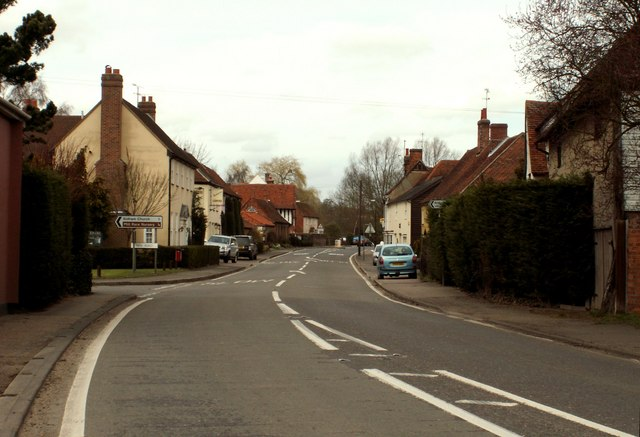
Fordstreet

Fordstreet or Ford Street is a village on the A1124 road, in the civil parish of Aldham in the Colchester district in Essex, England. It is located on the River Colne and is near the city of Colchester. Artist Damon Albarn lived there as a child.
