= Aldham, Essex =

Village in Essex, England

Coordinates: 51.8933°N 0.7853°E

Aldham
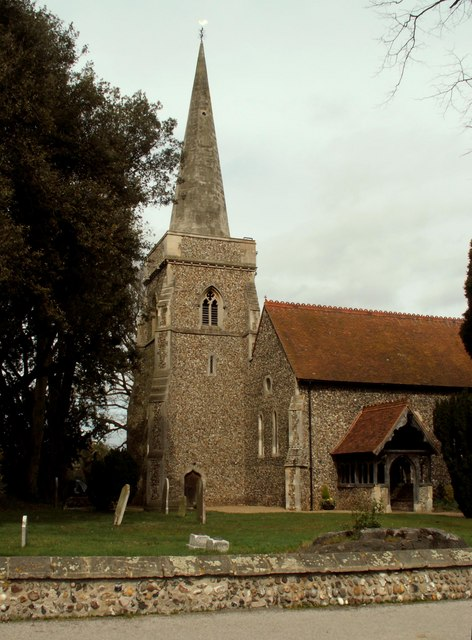
- Church of St Margaret and St Catherine

- Location within Essex
- Area: 2.77 sq mi (7.2 km^{2})
- Population: 507 (Parish, 2021)
  - Density: 183/sq mi (71/km^{2})
- OS grid reference: TL917253
- Civil parish: Aldham
- District: City of Colchester
- Shire county: Essex
- Region: East
- Country: England
- Sovereign state: United Kingdom
- Post town: COLCHESTER
- Postcode district: CO6
- Dialling code: 01206
- Police: Essex
- Fire: Essex
- Ambulance: East of England
- UK Parliament: Harwich and North Essex

Aldham is a village and civil parish in the City of Colchester district of Essex, England. It is located 4 1/2 mi (7.2 km) west of Colchester. The village is in the parliamentary constituency of Harwich and North Essex. The village has its own parish council.

The ancient parish covered 1,847 acres (747 ha) but local-government boundary changes reduced this to 1,770 acres (720 ha) by the mid-twentieth century. The village borders Fordstreet, Marks Tey and the River Colne to the north. The parish is geographically on an incline, with the land sloping from around 170 feet (50 m) in the northwest down to around 60 feet (20 m) near the Roman River, where it is susceptible to flooding.

At the 2021 census the parish had a population of 507. The population had been 513 in 2001 and 491 in 2011. It is 1 2/3 miles (2.7 km) from the A12 road, a major trunk road.

== History ==
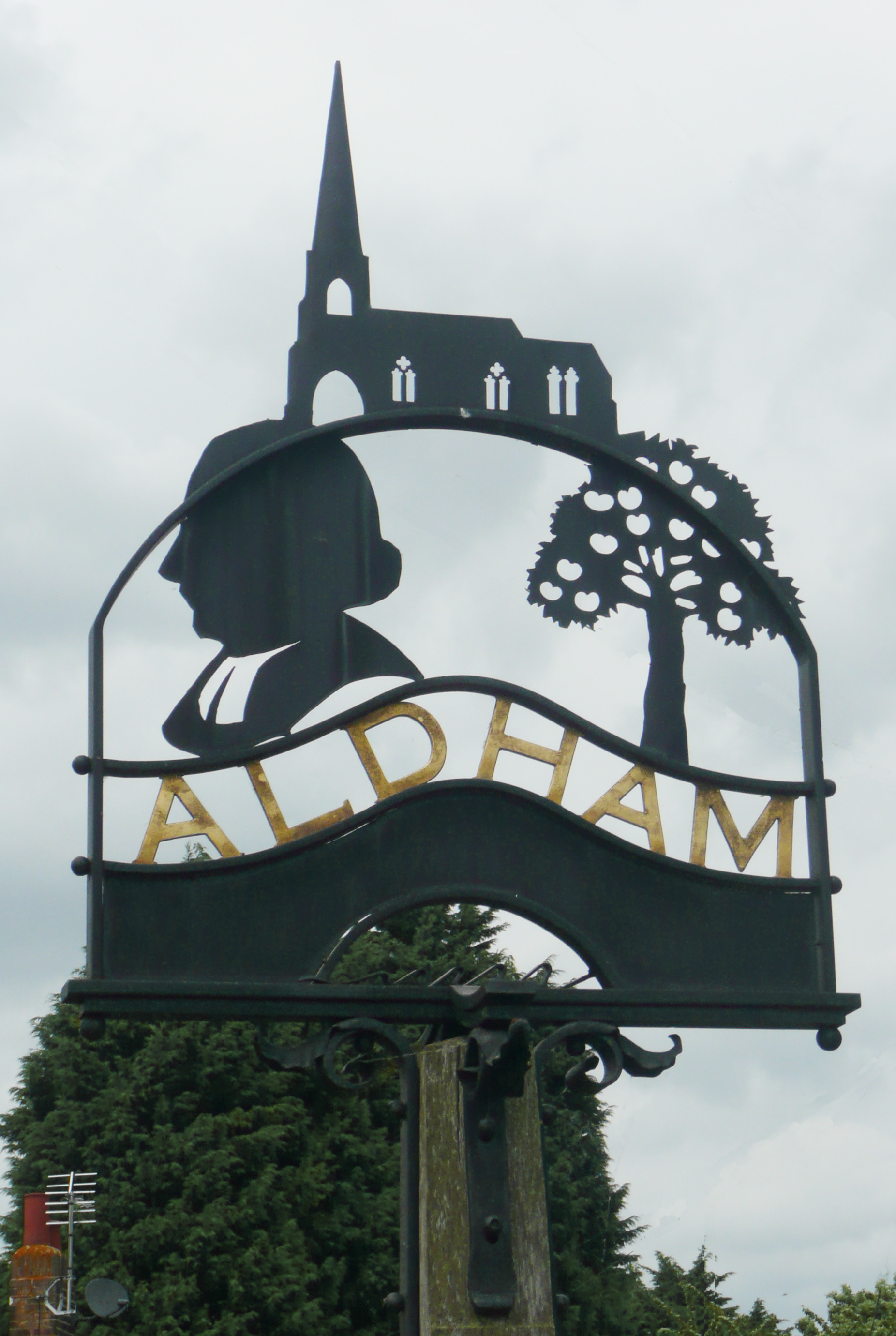
The village sign showing the church and the historian Philip Morant

There have been Iron Age finds in the area near Fordstreet and also pottery that may indicate Roman settlement. The village was founded in the Middle Ages, and by the time of the Domesday Book of 1086 there was a population of 12 with four households. The population rose in the late sixteenth and seventeenth centuries and by 1671 there were at least 55 households in the village.

=== Church ===
Aldham's parish church is dedicated to St Margaret and St Catherine and is a Grade II* listed building. The church is first mentioned in 1145. The original church stood by Old Church Farm to the west of the village. By the middle of the 19th century, it had become very decrepit; the floor was damp, the walls had to be supported by large brick buttresses, and stout wooden posts had replaced some of the pillars. In 1853, it was decided to build a new church in a more central location, modelled on the old one (but enlarged) and re-using as much of the original fabric as possible, notably the whole of the 14th-century south porch. Although located near the geographical centre of the parish, only a few cottages were in close proximity to the new church, with the majority of the buildings in the parish on the main road at Fordstreet. However, since that time, there has been much building near the church and the area has become known as "Aldham Village" to differentiate it from Fordstreet. Since 1951, the parish has been held jointly with Marks Tey.

== Notable residents ==
- Philip Morant — historian of Essex, Rector from 1745 to 1770, his profile appears on the village sign; buried in Aldham
- Damon Albarn — musician, lead singer of Blur and co-creator of "virtual" rock band Gorillaz; spent part of his childhood in Aldham
