= Yeldham (surname) =

Yeldham is an English surname. Notable people with the surname include:

- Florence Yeldham (1877–1945), British school teacher and historian of arithmetic
- Peter Yeldham (1927–2022), Australian screenwriter
- Ronald Yeldham (1902–1983), Indian born cricketer
