= Great Yeldham =

Village in Essex, England

Coordinates: 52.016215°N 0.562706°E

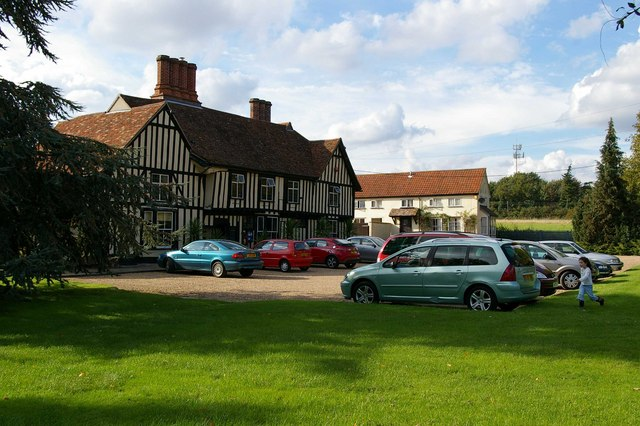
- White Hart Hotel, Great Yeldham

- Location within Essex
- Population: 1,948 (Parish, 2021)
- OS grid reference: TL765385
- District: Braintree
- Shire county: Essex
- Region: East
- Country: England
- Sovereign state: United Kingdom
- Post town: HALSTEAD
- Postcode district: CO9
- Dialling code: 01787
- Police: Essex
- Fire: Essex
- Ambulance: East of England
- UK Parliament: Braintree

Great Yeldham is a village and civil parish in north Essex, England, about 6 miles (10 km) from the Suffolk border. It is situated along the main A1017 road (formerly A604) between Braintree and Haverhill. At the 2021 census the parish had a population of 1,948.

== History ==
Great Yeldham contains the Great Oak, an old preserved oak tree in the centre of the village, which is claimed to have been recorded in William the Conqueror's Domesday Book of 1086.

== Geography ==
The village is where the infant River Colne is joined by a stream from near Stambourne and another that has flowed via Toppesfield. The river flows through Colchester on its 39-mile journey to the North Sea.

From the 1950s to the 1970s, Great Yeldham was home to the Whitlock Bros., an agricultural equipment manufacturer. In 1972, Whitlock Bros. was taken over by Hymac and production subsequently moved to Rhymney in South Wales; the plant closed, resulting in many job losses.

The land around Great Yeldham is used principally for arable farming and some livestock rearing. From the early 1950s until the mid-1980s, it was also known for Lark Hill Farm, its apple and strawberry farm.

== Transport ==
Until 1962, it was served for passenger traffic by Yeldham railway station on the Colne Valley and Halstead Railway line between Chappel and Wakes Colne and Haverhill. The line crossed Station Road at a level crossing, which has since been renamed Toppesfield Road.
