= White Colne =

Village and civil parish in Essex, England

Coordinates: 51.936°N 0.726°E

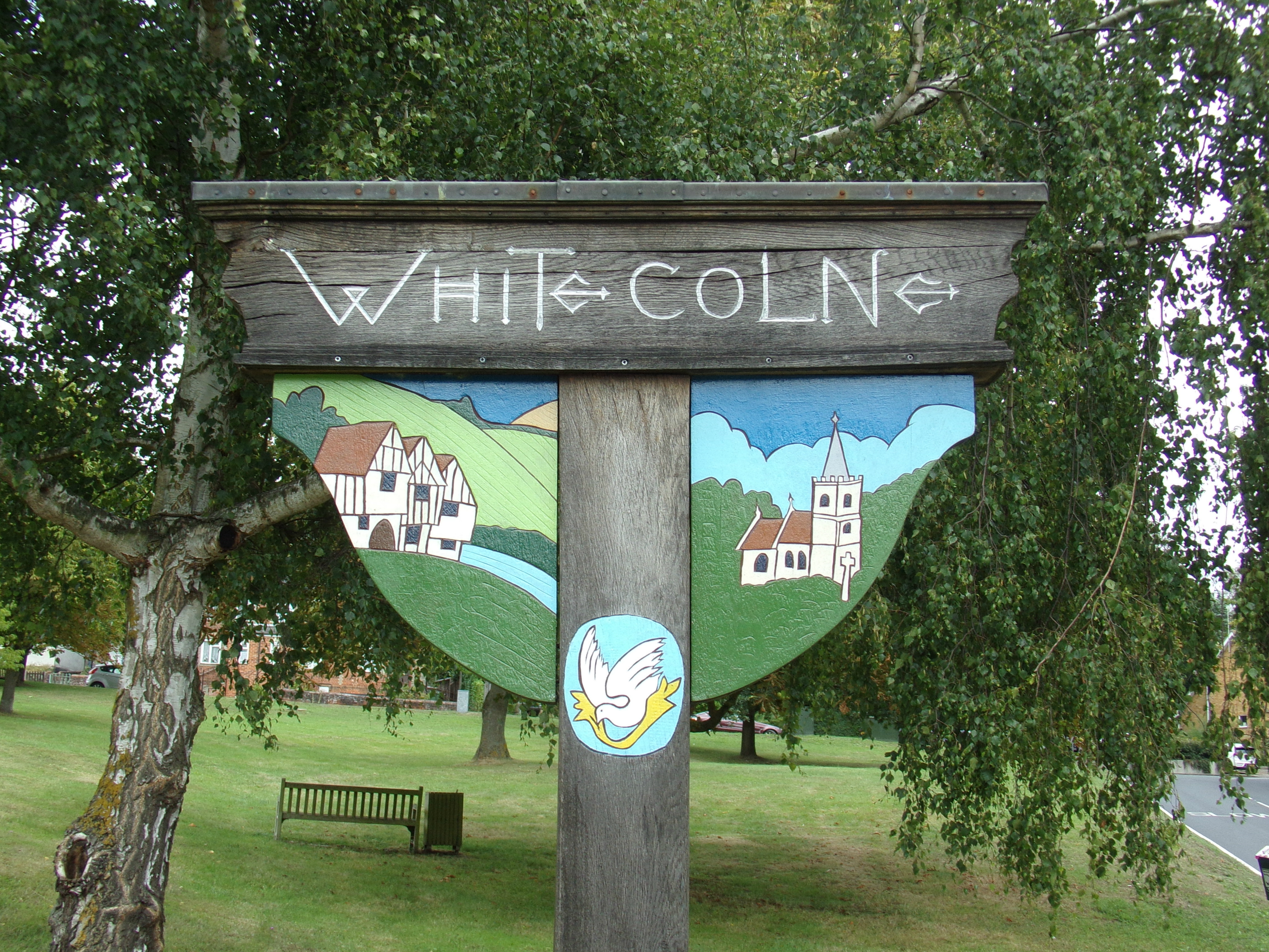
- Village sign of White Colne

- Location within Essex
- Population: 501 (Parish, 2021)
- District: Braintree
- Shire county: Essex
- Region: East
- Country: England
- Sovereign state: United Kingdom
- Post town: Colchester
- Postcode district: CO6
- Dialling code: 01206; 01787
- Police: Essex
- Fire: Essex
- Ambulance: East of England
- UK Parliament: Braintree

White Colne is a village and civil parish in Essex, England, on the north side of the River Colne, opposite Earls Colne, and on the Colchester road, 4 miles (6.4 km) East South East of Halstead. At the 2021 census the parish had a population of 501.

It traces its history back to the Domesday Book of 1086 and beyond. There is evidence of Palaeolithic and Mesolithic settlement in the area. White Colne railway station was a station on the Colne Valley and Halstead Railway.

The village church is dedicated to St Andrew. The German film actor Anton Diffring is buried in the churchyard.
