= George E. Hibbard =

American art collector

George E. Hibbard (1924–1991) was a Saint Louis-born American art collector, and expert on Tibetan art and culture.

Despite his expertise on Tibet, he never actually went there because of Chinese government restrictions. However, much of Tibetan culture can be observed in the immediate border areas of India and Nepal.

Hibbard's collection consisted of Thankas (meditation scrolls) and bronze figures dating back to the 16th century.

Hibbard befriended the eldest brother of the Dalai Lama, Thubten Norbu, and traveled with him to India, where he was allowed in temples that would have been off-limits had it not been for his escort.

Hibbard gave lectures and presented papers on his field of study at Washington University in St. Louis, Harvard, University of Michigan, University of Denver, Indiana University, Yale the International Congress of Orientalists, the National Convention of the Oriental Society, and the Midwest Conference on Asian Studies.

He joined the United States Tibet Society and worked diligently to provide assistance to Tibetan refugees.
