= Hibberd =

Hibberd is a surname. Notable people with the surname include:

- Carly Hibberd (1985–2011), Australian road cyclist
- Dominic Hibberd (1941–2012), English biographer
- George Hibberd (1845–1911), English cricketer
- Jack Hibberd (born 1940), Australian playwright
- James Hibberd (cricketer) (born 1981), English cricketer
- James Hibberd, American journalist
- Julian Hibberd (born 1969), British plant scientist
- Laurie Hibberd (born 1964), American television personality
- Shirley Hibberd (1825–1890), English garden writer
- Stuart Hibberd (1893–1983), British radio personality
- Thomas Hibberd (born 1926), Canadian ice hockey player

== See also ==
- F. C. Hibberd & Co Ltd, British locomotive-building company
- Hibbard
- Hibbert
