= John Hibbard (cricketer) =

English cricketer

Personal information
- Full name: John Arthur Hibbard
- Born: 7 September 1863; Chatham, Kent
- Died: 17 October 1905 (aged 42); Gillingham, Kent
- Batting: Right-handed
- Role: Wicket-keeper

Domestic team information
- Years: Team
- 1893: Kent
- FC debut: 5 June 1893 Kent v Gloucestershire
- Last FC: 22 June 1893 Kent v Australians

Career statistics
Competition	First-class
Matches	4
Runs scored	19
Batting average	4.75
100s/50s	0/0
Top score	7
Catches/stumpings	10/0
- Source: Cricinfo, 10 March 2017

John Arthur Hibbard (7 September 1863 – 17 October 1905) was an English Royal Navy officer and cricketer. He played in four first-class matches for Kent County Cricket Club in 1893.

== Early life ==
Hibbard was born at Chatham, Kent in 1863, the son of Stephen and Elizabeth Hibbard (née Baker). His father was a policeman, although he later became a publican and ran The Canterbury Hotel in Gillingham.

== Military service ==
Working as an engineer, Hibbard joined the Royal Navy in 1863, initially as an acting assistant engineer at Devonport in Plymouth, training on HMS Asia and HMS President. He held the rank of assistant engineer between 1885 and 1890, serving on HMS Minotaur. He qualified as a chief engineer in 1889 and was promoted to engineer in 1890, to chief engineer in 1900 and in 1904 to the rank of engineer lieutenant. He served on HMS Orlando, HMS Mersey and HMS Severn during his service, as well as spending periods on shore at Devonport and at Pembroke Dock in Wales.

In December 1904 Hibbard left the Navy, deemed unfit for service.

== Cricket ==
Hibbard had a reputation as a good wicket-keeper playing in the Chatham area whilst on leave, and is known to have played for Rochester Cricket Club amongst others. In 1893, whilst on leave from service at Pembroke Dock, he was called into the Kent county team and played in four matches, including two in the County Championship. He made his county debut against Gloucestershire at Bristol in early June, scoring two runs and taking three catches on debut. After playing against Marylebone Cricket Club (MCC) at Lord's, he played twice towards the end of June at Gravesend, once in the Championship against Middlesex before playing his final match against the touring Australians.

Unable to play again for the county due to his naval service―Hibbard spent most of the period between May 1894 and September 1897 at sea―he scored a total of 19 first-class runs, with two scores of seven runs his best efforts with the bat. He took ten catches and Wisden commented that he had kept wickets in "good style" in the 1894 edition.

== Death ==
Hibbard died in October 1905 aged 42. He did not marry and his effects were inherited by his brother.

== Bibliography ==
- Carlaw, Derek (2020). Kent County Cricketers, A to Z: Part One (1806–1914) (PDF). Cardiff: ACS.
