= Philip Morant =

English clergyman and historian

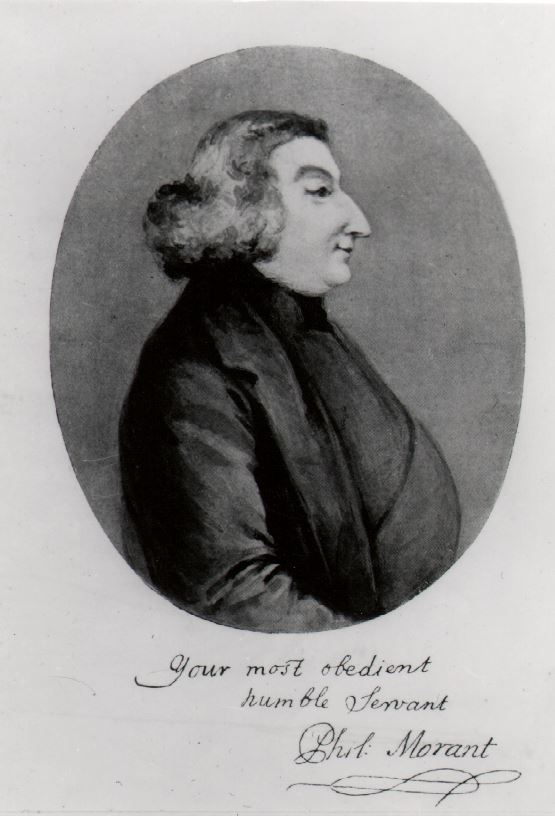
- Print of Philip Morant held at Abingdon School
- Born: 6 October 1700; Jersey
- Died: 25 November 1770 (aged 70); Battersea, London, England

Philip Morant FSA (6 October 1700 – 25 November 1770) was an English clergyman, author and historian. He is best known for his History and Antiquities of Colchester (1748) and his county history, The History and Antiquities of the County of Essex (1763–1768).

== Education ==
He was educated at John Roysse's Free School in Abingdon (now Abingdon School) and Pembroke College, Oxford, eventually taking his master's degree at Sidney Sussex College, Cambridge in 1729.

== Career ==
Ordained in 1722, he began his association with the county of Essex with a curacy at Great Waltham near Chelmsford in 1722. He was the Chaplain of the English Episcopal Church in Amsterdam from 1732 to 1734. In 1737 he became both the Rector of St Mary-at-the-Walls, Colchester as well as Rector of Aldham in Essex. During his time in Colchester, Morant wrote The History and Antiquities of Colchester, published in 1748; and his county history, The History and Antiquities of the County of Essex, published in two volumes between 1763 and 1768. He also conducted a number of excavations of Roman sites in and around the town. He married Anne Stebbing in 1739 and they had a daughter, Anna Maria. In 1755, Philip Morant was elected to the Fellowship of the Society of Antiquaries of London.

After the death of his wife, he moved to his son-in-law's house in Battersea and was employed in the House of Lords, although he retained the living of both his parishes. He died in 1770 and is buried at Aldham.

== Legacy ==
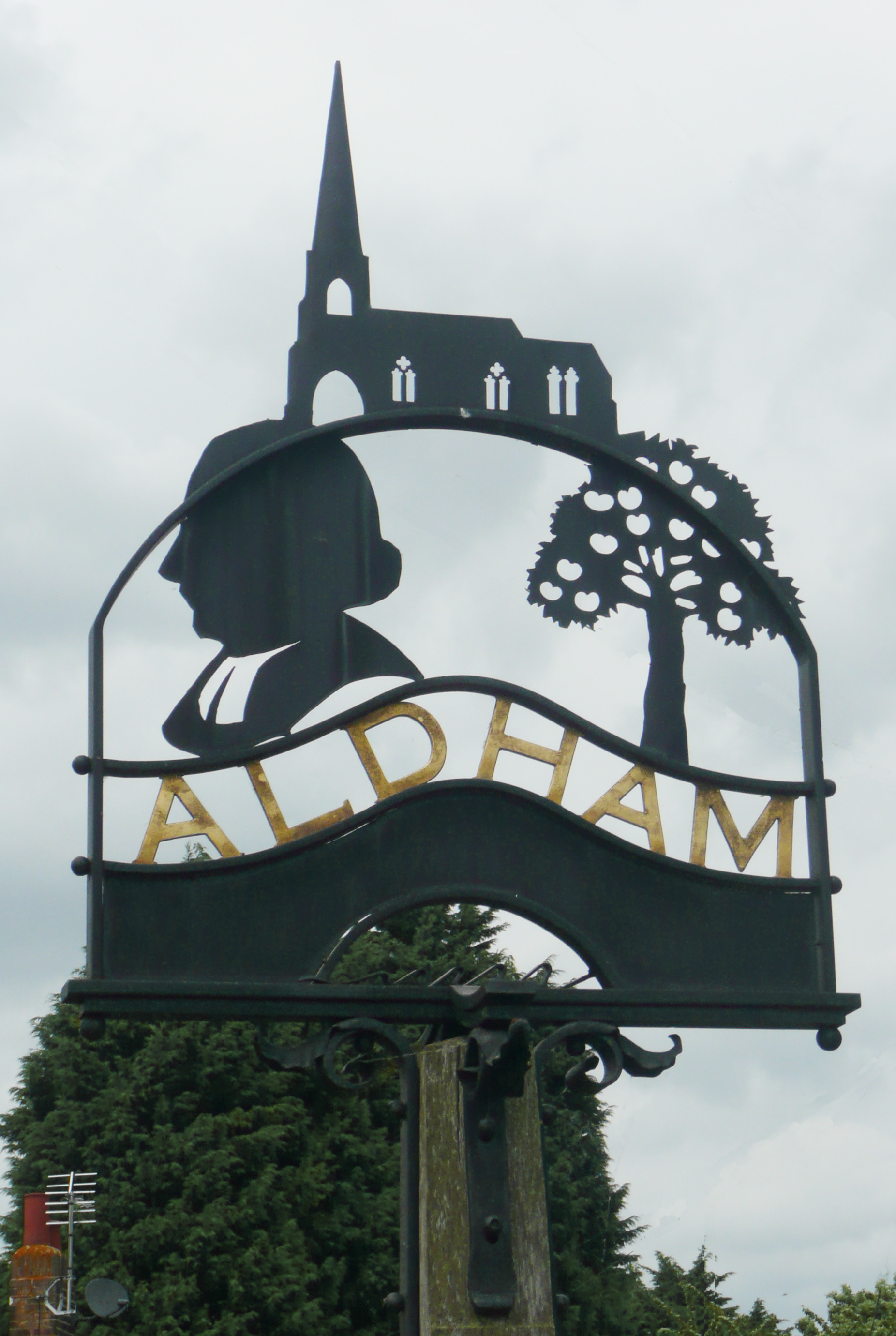
Image of Morant on the Aldham village sign

There is a contemporary memorial to Morant and a window of 1855 in his memory in the new church at Aldham (the memorial was moved in 1854). There is also a wooden plaque at St Mary-at-the-Walls, Colchester, dated 1966.

His silhouette appears on the village sign at Aldham.

The Morant Club was formed in Colchester in 1909 to investigate local archaeology, but was dissolved in 1925.

In 1965, The Norman Way Secondary School in Prettygate, Colchester was renamed Philip Morant School and College in his honour.

== See also ==
- List of Old Abingdonians
