= Hibbard, Montana =

Coordinates: 46°37′26.1″N 107°39′3.56″W

Hibbard is a ghost town in Rosebud County, in the U.S. state of Montana.

== History ==
A post office was established in Hibbard in 1912, and remained in operation until it was discontinued in 1924. The town was named in honor of George W. Hibbard, a railroad agent.
