= Yeldham railway station =

Former railway station in Essex, England

Coordinates: 52.0115°N 0.5627°E

Yeldham
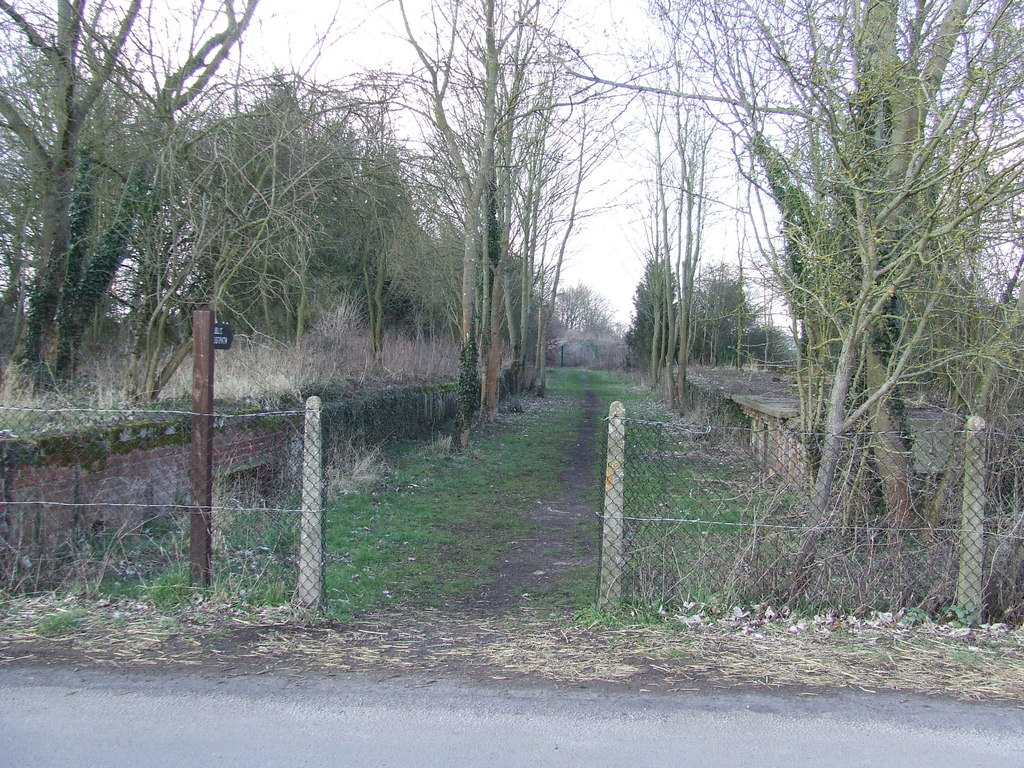
- The site of the station in 2013

General information
- Location: Great Yeldham, Braintree; England
- Platforms: 1

Other information
- Status: Disused

History
- Original company: Colne Valley and Halstead Railway
- Pre-grouping: Colne Valley and Halstead Railway
- Post-grouping: London and North Eastern Railway

Key dates
- 26 May 1862: Opened
- 1 Jan 1962: Closed for passengers
- 28 December 1964: Closed for freight
Location

Yeldham railway station was located in Great Yeldham, Essex, England. It was a stop on the Colne Valley and Halstead Railway and was sited 62 miles 12 chains (100 km) from London Liverpool Street, via Marks Tey.

== History ==
The station opened on 26 May 1862 by the Colne Valley and Halstead Railway, on an extension of the line from Chappel & Wakes Colne to Haverhill.

As with many rural lines, the rise of the motor car reduced patronage; the last train stopped here on 30 December 1961 and station was closed two days later. The tracks were lifted in 1966.

Preceding station	Disused railways	Following station
Whitley	Colne Valley and Halstead Railway	Sible and Castle Hedingham

== The site today ==
The platforms are extant and were cleared in 2010. A path now passes through the old station site.
