= Colne Valley and Halstead Railway =

Railway line in England

The Colne Valley and Halstead Railway (CVHR) is a closed railway between Haverhill, Suffolk and Chappel and Wakes Colne, Essex, in England.

== History ==
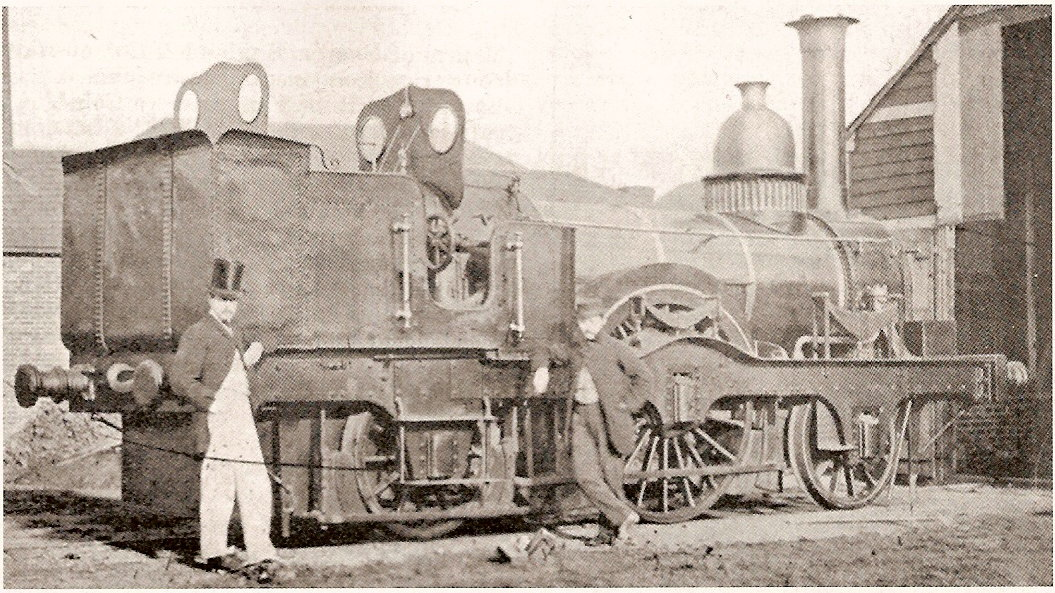
A mid Victorian era photograph showing a Colne Valley and Halstead Railway 2-2-2WT at Halstead engine shed.

A railway in the Colne Valley was first proposed in 1846 when the Colchester, Stour Valley, Sudbury and Halstead Railway Company was incorporated by the Colchester, Stour Valley, Sudbury and Halstead Railway Act 1846 (9 & 10 Vict. c. lxxvi) to build a line from Marks Tey on the Eastern Counties Railway to Sudbury, with a branch to Halstead and a line from Colchester to Hythe. A later extension to Bury St. Edmunds and Clare was also approved, however a shortage of funds resulted in only the Stour Valley Railway to Sudbury and the line to Hythe being built.

Colne Valley and Halstead Railway Act 1856
- Act of Parliament
- Parliament of the United Kingdom
- Long title: An Act for making a Railway from the Chappel Station of the Colchester, Stour Valley, Sudbury, and Halstead Railway to Halstead in the County of Essex, and for other Purposes.
- Citation: 19 & 20 Vict. c. lxi

Dates
- Royal assent: 30 June 1856

Text of statute as originally enacted

In 1856, the Colne Valley and Halstead Railway Company was formed by local people to build a branch line from Chappel and Wakes Colne railway station to Halstead. It was authorised by the Colne Valley and Halstead Railway Act 1856 (19 & 20 Vict. c. lxi) on 30 June 1856, and opened on 16 April 1860 between Chappel (north of Marks Tey) and Halstead, a distance of 6 miles (10 km).

Colne Valley and Halstead Railway (Extension) Act 1859
- Act of Parliament
- Parliament of the United Kingdom
- Long title: An Act to enable the Colne Valley and Halstead Railway Company to extend their Railway from Halstead to Haverhill in the County of Essex.
- Citation: 22 & 23 Vict. c. cxxii

Dates
- Royal assent: 13 August 1859

Colne Valley and Halstead Railway Amendment Act 1861
- Act of Parliament
- Parliament of the United Kingdom
- Long title: An Act to increase the Capital of the Colne Valley and Halstead Railway Company, and for other Purposes.
- Citation: 24 & 25 Vict. c. ccxxxvii

Dates
- Royal assent: 6 August 1861

A 13 miles (21 km) extension was authorised by the Colne Valley and Halstead Railway (Extension) Act 1859 (22 & 23 Vict. c. cxxii) on 13 August 1859 and opened in stages:

- 1 July 1861 Halstead–Castle Hedingham
- 26 May 1862 Castle Hedingham–Yeldham
- 10 May 1863 Yeldham–Haverhill (CVHR)

Physical connection with the Stour Valley Railway at Haverhill was provided in 1865, and although close relations were maintained with the Great Eastern Railway, the Colne Valley and Halstead Railway remained completely independent until it became part of the London and North Eastern Railway in the 1923 regrouping. The CVHR station, renamed Haverhill South, was closed to passengers in 1924 but remained open for goods until 1965.

== Heritage railway preservation ==
The line remained open until 30 December 1961, when passenger traffic ended. In 1965, freight traffic ended, and the line was taken up a year later.

A mile of track was reconstructed in 1973-75 as the Colne Valley Railway, including Castle Hedingham station. In 2012, the site of the former Yeldham station was cleared for a pathway, the most likely site for any future extension.

== Nature reserve ==
A stretch of the former track north and east of Earls Colne is now the Colne Valley Local Nature Reserve.
