= Jasper King =

English cricketer

Robert Jasper Stuart King, also known as Robert Stuart-King (10 May 1909 – 11 May 1992), was an English cricketer.

== Family ==
King was born in Leigh-on-Sea to a family of Anglican priests. His father, Robert King was Rector of St Clement's Church, Leigh-on-Sea, from 1892 to 1950, and his grandfather, Walker King, had been Rector of the same church from 1859 to 1892. Among his other clerical relatives was his great-uncle, Edward King, who was Bishop of Lincoln from 1885 to 1910 and was famously prosecuted for ritualistic practices.

== Cricketing career and later life ==
King was captain of cricket at Felsted School.

Later, he was a right-handed batsman and leg-break bowler who played for Essex. He represented Essex in one match during the 1928 season, scoring just three runs from the lower-order, and conceding 20 runs from 7 overs in the ball in his two bowling spells.

King moved to South Africa in his early fifties, and umpired 29 first-class cricket matches in total, mostly in the Currie Cup during the 1960s and 1970s.

He moved back to England late in his life, after umpiring his final game at the age of 70, and died at Westcliff-on-Sea, Essex, the day after his 83rd birthday.
