= Robert King (footballer) =

English footballer and Anglican clergyman

Personal information
- Full name: Robert Stuart King
- Date of birth: 4 April 1862
- Place of birth: Leigh-on-Sea, England
- Date of death: 4 March 1950 (aged 87)
- Position: Half back

Senior career*
Years	Team	Apps	(Gls)
1882–1885	Oxford University		
- Upton Park
- Grimsby Town

International career
1882	England	1	(0)
- * Club domestic league appearances and goals

Canon Robert Stuart King (4 April 1862 – 4 March 1950) was an English international footballer and Anglican clergyman.

== Family ==
King was the sixth and youngest child of Rev. Walker King, Rector of Leigh-on-Sea, and Juliana Stuart. His brother Charles was also a footballer.

On his father's side, many of his relatives were prominent clergymen, including his uncle, Rt. Rev. Edward King, Bishop of Lincoln, his grandfather, Ven. Walker King, Archdeacon of Rochester, and his great-grandfather, Rt. Rev. Walker King, Bishop of Rochester.

On his mother's side, his relatives included the diplomat Robert Stuart, the artist James Stuart and the Indian Army officer Charles "Hindoo" Stuart.

King married Ruby Elberta Kate Irene Dando in 1902. One of their four children was the cricketer Jasper King.

== Education and clerical career ==
King attended Felsted School from 1873 to 1880, where he was captain of the Cricket XI in 1879 and captain of the Football XI in 1880. He later studied at Hertford College, Oxford, obtaining his B.A. degree in 1885; and his M.A. in 1890.

King was ordained in 1888. He initially worked as curate at St James Church, Grimsby, and was later appointed assistant curate at St Clement's Church, Leigh-on-Sea, Essex.

In 1892 King succeeded his father as Rector of Leigh-on-Sea, serving until his death in 1950. In 1918 he was appointed honorary Canon of Chelmsford.

== Football career ==
Whilst at Oxford, King played in the Football XI from 1882 to 1885. He earned one cap for the England national team on 18 February 1882, playing as a half back in a match against Ireland.

King also played for Upton Park and Grimsby Town in the 1880s.

== Later life ==
During World War Two he served in the Home Guard as a sergeant, but as a clergyman, he was not allowed to bear arms.
