= Jack Chesher =

- Occupations: Author; Historian; Tour guide
- Known for: Living London History
- Website: livinglondonhistory.com

Jack Chesher (born 1993) is a British author, historian, and walking tour guide based in London. He is the creator of Living London History, a tour company and social media project documenting the architectural and social history of London.

== Early life and education ==
Chesher grew up in Leigh-on-Sea, Essex. He studied history at the University of Bristol, where he resided for seven years before returning to London. Prior to his work in historical research, he worked in hotel management for four years. He later trained as a tour guide through the Open City Golden Key Academy.

== Career ==
Chesher founded Living London History in 2020, initially as a blog during the COVID-19 pandemic to document his walks through the city. The project expanded into guided tours and a social media presence of over 500,000 followers across Instagram and TikTok, focusing on "small history" architectural details and lesser-known anecdotes often overlooked by traditional tourism. Chesher's research focuses on the intersection of London's architectural evolution and its social history. His work includes the study of surviving medieval structural features and the impact of early urban planning constraints on the city's modern layout.

In 2025, Chesher conducted research at Windsor Castle regarding the site's historical development.

== Publications ==
- London: A Guide for Curious Wanderers (ISBN 978-0711277410). White Lion Publishing, 2022.
- London: The Hidden Corners for Curious Wanderers (ISBN 978-0711293779). White Lion Publishing, 2024.
