= Robert Stuart (British Army officer) =

British officer and diplomat

Personal details
- Born: 17 February 1813 County Clare, Ireland
- Died: 17 June 1901 (aged 88) Leamington Spa, UKGBI
- Spouse: Elizabeth Sarah Stuart (m. 1842)
- Relations: Charles Stuart (uncle); Thomas Smyth (alleged grandfather); William Horwood Stuart (nephew); Robert King (nephew); Charles King (nephew)

Military service
- Allegiance: UKGBI
- Years of service: 1834–1852 c. 1853–c. 1855
- Rank: Major
- Battles: Crimean War

Major Robert Stuart (17 February 1813 – 17 June 1901) was an Irish army officer and diplomat.

== Early life ==
Robert Stuart was born on 17 February 1813 in County Clare, Ireland to Thomas Stuart. Through his father, Stuart was the nephew of Charles Stuart and was the potential grandson of Irish politician Thomas Smyth. Stuart was one of 8 siblings and was the younger brother of the artist James Stuart.

Through his brother Rev. William Stuart, Vicar of Mundon and Rector of Hazeleigh in Essex, Stuart was the uncle of William Horwood Stuart. Through his brother Rev. Walker King, Rector of Leigh-on-Sea, Stuart was the uncle of Robert Stuart King and Charles King.

== Military and diplomatic career ==
On 23 May 1834, Stuart enlisted as an ensign in the 41st Regiment of Foot. Later promoted lieutenant, he exchanged into the 7th Foot in 1838 and purchased a captaincy in 1842. He exchanged into the 41st Foot in 1851 and retired in 1852.

During the Crimean War, however, he rejoined the army, rising to the rank of major and serving on the staff of General Fenwick Williams. He remained in the region after the war. In 1858 he was appointed Vice-Consul at Volos, and in 1860 was sent to investigate the condition of Christians in Thessaly and Epirus. In 1861 he became Consul in Albania, based in Janina. In 1873 he was made Consul-General for the Russian ports in the Black Sea and the Sea of Azof, and was based at Odessa – at this time his private secretary was his nephew, William Horwood Stuart.

In 1874 he became Consul-General in Haiti and Chargé d'Affaires for the Dominican Republic, and in 1876 he helped to save the life of the President of Haiti, Michel Domingue, during an uprising. He was also the author of a confidential report sent to the Foreign Office entitled "The People of the Haitian Republic", which may have been an unacknowledged source for the memoirs of his predecessor, Spenser St. John, which were published in 1884.

Stuart retired in 1883 to Breton-lodge, Leamington Spa.

== Other activities ==
In 1856, Stuart led an expedition to the summit of Mount Ararat, along with Major Alick Fraser, the Rev. Walter Thursby, James Theobald and John Evans.

He was the author of various papers, including:

- 1868: "The Vlakhs of Mount Pindus", Transactions of the Ethnological Society of London, vol. 6, pp. 311–327
- 1869: "On the Physical Geography and Natural Resources of Epirus", Journal of the Royal Geographical Society of London, vol. 39, pp. 276–295
- 1877: "The Ascent of Mount Ararat in 1856", Proceedings of the Royal Geographical Society, vol. 21, pp. 77–92
- 1878: "Haïti or Hispaniola", Journal of the Royal Geographical Society of London, vol. 48, pp. 234–278

== Personal life ==
On 2 June 1842, Stuart married Elizabeth Sarah Stuart (née Cathcart) at All Saints Church, Leamington Spa.

On 17 June 1901 Stuart died at Breton-lodge, Leamington Spa aged 88, and was buried at Leamington Spa Cemetery.
