= William Horwood Stuart =

British diplomat

- Born: Harrow, Middlesex, UKGBI
- Baptised: 6 May 1857
- Died: 20 May 1906 (aged 48–49); Batum, Russian Empire
- Cause of death: Homicide
- Occupations: Diplomat; merchant
- Relatives: Robert Stuart (uncle); James Stuart (uncle); Charles Stuart (great-uncle)

William Horwood Stuart (c. 1857 – 20 May 1906) was a British and Irish diplomat and merchant, who was murdered whilst serving as the United States vice-consul in Batum, Russian Empire.

== Family ==
Stuart was born in Harrow, Middlesex (present-day Greater London) to William Stuart and Caroline Stuart (née Horwood). Stuart was baptised on 6 May 1857 at St Mary's Church. Stuart's father was born in Ireland and his mother was born in Aston Clinton, Buckinghamshire. Stuart's father later served as Vicar of Mundon, Essex (1862–1889), and Rector of Hazeleigh, Essex (1889–1896).

Stuart was the nephew of army officer and diplomat Major Robert Stuart and the surgeon and artist James Stuart. Stuart was the great-nephew of Charles Stuart, an Irish officer in the East India Company Army.

== Early career ==
In 1873 Stuart was serving as Private Secretary to his uncle Major Robert Stuart, a British consul-general for the Russian ports on the Black Sea and the Sea of Azov in Odessa, Ukraine. In the 1880s he was based in Brăila in Romania, where, in July 1885, his younger brother Charles Leader Justice Stuart drowned in the Danube at the age of 16.

== Batum ==
By the early 1890s, Stuart had moved to Batum, Russian Empire (present-day Batumi, Georgia) where he remained until his death. In 1904 he became an American vice-consul and in 1906 was also serving as an acting British consul. Stuart had been named Japanese consul but his appointment was deferred owing to the outbreak of the Russo-Japanese War.

While serving in Batum, Stuart actively lobbied for the American interests in the region and was connected with an American copper-mining concern in the Caucasus. He was the representative of several British companies, including MacAndrew Forbes. He was one of the largest ship-brokers and exporters of Batum.

At about 11 p.m. on 20 May 1906, Stuart was returning to his home at Makhinjauri, 5 miles north of Batum, after dining with a friend, when he was shot three times from behind a tree. He was taken to a nearby military barracks but died within an hour.

It seems likely that the murder was committed for personal reasons and that the murderers were paid to carry out the act. Stuart had spent most of his life in Eastern Europe and could speak several local languages; he was respected by the local populations but during the revolutionary uprisings of the previous year, his life was threatened and he was obliged to hand over large amounts of cash. In a letter to the United States Secretary of State on 31 May 1906, Ambassador George von Lengerke Meyer wrote that two men, "Kassim Didjavadgé and Ali Porkhall Oghly" had been arrested.

== Reaction to the murder ==
The matter of the murder was taken up by all levels of the American, British and Russian diplomatic services. Letters and memoranda were exchanged by Elihu Root (United States Secretary of State), George von Lengerke Meyer (US Ambassador to Russia), Whitelaw Reid (US Ambassador to the UK), Cecil Spring Rice (British Chargé d'Affaires at Saint Petersburg, and author of the lyrics to the hymn I Vow to Thee My Country), Patrick Stevens (British Consul at Batum), Alexander Petrovich Izvolsky (Russian Foreign Minister) and Baron Roman Romanovitch Rosen (Russian Ambassador to the US).
