= Walker King =

English churchman and man of letters

- Bishop of Rochester
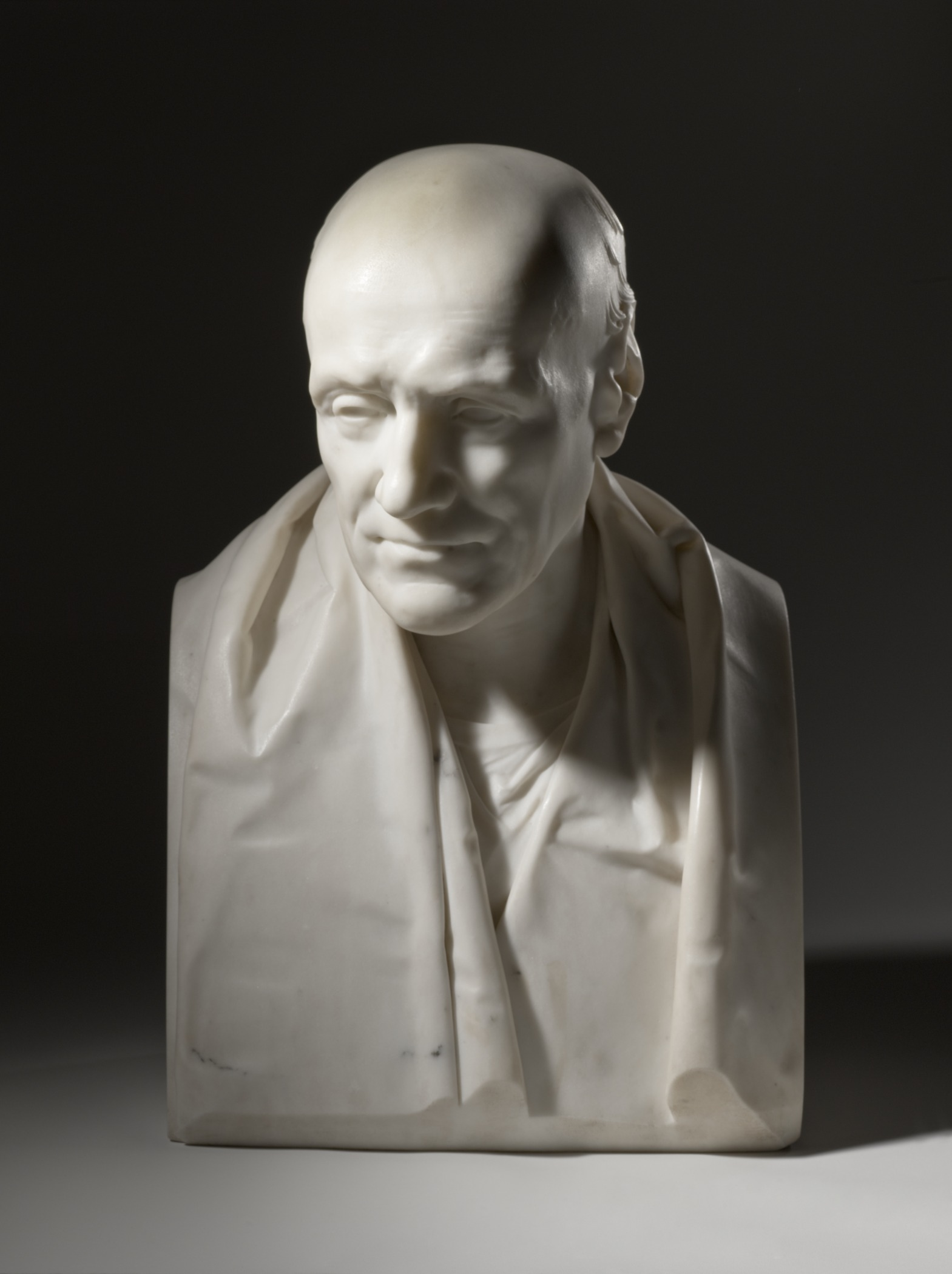
- Church: Church of England
- Diocese: Diocese of Rochester
- Elected: 1809
- Term ended: 1827 (death)
- Predecessor: Thomas Dampier
- Successor: Hugh Percy

Orders
- Consecration: c. 1809

Personal details
- Baptised: 4 December 1751
- Died: 22 February 1827
- Denomination: Anglican
- Parents: Revd James King & Anne Walker
- Spouse: Sarah Dawson
- Children: Ven Walker King, Archdeacon of Rochester
- Profession: Academic; editor
- Education: Brasenose College, Oxford

Walker King (4 December 1751 – 22 February 1827) was an English churchman and man of letters, bishop of Rochester from 1809, and, together with French Laurence, co-editor of the works of Edmund Burke.

== Life ==
King was the son of the Reverend James King of Clitheroe, Lancashire, and Anne, daughter of John Walker, of Hungerhill, Bolton-by-Bowland. James King and John King, Under Secretary of State at the Home Office were his brothers; his father later became Dean of Raphoe. He was educated at Sedbergh School and later matriculated at Brasenose College, Oxford on 20 February 1768, aged 16. King migrated to Corpus Christi College, Oxford, graduating B.A. in 1771, M.A. in 1775, B.D. and D.D. in 1788. He became a Fellow of Corpus Christi.

In his clerical career, he was prebendary of Peterborough, 1794, canon of Wells, 1796, prebendary of Canterbury, 1803, and prebendary of Westminster, 1827. He was Bishop of Rochester from 1809. He and Henry Bathurst, Bishop of Norwich were the only two bishops to support Catholic emancipation. He died on 22 February 1827.

== Works ==
King served as the main editor for the later volumes of Burke's Works. The edition he prepared with Laurence was in eight volumes, appearing 1792 to 1827.

== Family ==
King married Sarah, daughter of Edward Dawson. His son the Ven Walker King was archdeacon of Rochester and father of Edward King. Walker's great-grandson, Reverend Robert Stuart King, once played football for the English national side.

Church of England titles
Preceded by Thomas Dampier	Bishop of Rochester; 1809–1827	Succeeded by Hugh Percy
