= Woodham Mortimer =

Village in Essex, England

Coordinates: 51.709°N 0.628°E

- Location within Essex
- Population: 526 (Parish, 2021)
- OS grid reference: TL815044
- District: Maldon
- Shire county: Essex
- Region: East
- Country: England
- Sovereign state: United Kingdom
- Post town: Maldon
- Postcode district: CM9
- Dialling code: 01245 & 01621
- Police: Essex
- Fire: Essex
- Ambulance: East of England
- UK Parliament: Witham

Woodham Mortimer is a village and civil parish on the Dengie Peninsula in the Maldon District of Essex, England. It lies about three miles west-south-west of the town of Maldon. At the 2021 census the parish had a population of 526. Woodham Mortimer shares a grouped parish council with the neighbouring parish of Hazeleigh.

== History ==
The discovery of a hoard of denarii dated to 41 CE is some evidence of occupation in Roman times. However, the village first appears in written records as "Wudeham" in c. 975. The name, which means "village in the wood", is derived from the old English words "wudu" (wood in modern English) and "ham" (home, or homestead). At the time of the Norman Conquest the parish belonged to Ralph Peverell and was known as Little Woodham. Henry II gave the parish to Robert de Mortimer, leading to the change in name.

In the Domesday Book the population was recorded as 14 households with the local lord in 1066 being Siward Barn.

During the First World War a new aerodrome was opened in nearby Stow Maries to provide air cover for the London area. 37 Squadron, Royal Flying Corps occupied the base from September 1916 taking over The Grange in Woodham Mortimer as its headquarters. The Grange was once the property of Beeleigh Abbey and is a Grade II listed building.

== Governance ==
There are three tiers of local government covering Woodham Mortimer, at parish, district, and county level: Woodham Mortimer and Hazeleigh Parish Council, Maldon District Council, and Essex County Council. The parish council is a grouped parish council, also covering the neighbouring parish of Hazeleigh. The parish council meets at the village hall on Post Office Road in Woodham Mortimer.

The parish forms part of the Witham constituency for parliamentary elections. The local MP is Priti Patel.

== Geography ==
Woodham Mortimer has an average elevation of 51 metres (167 ft) above sea level and lies just south of the Danbury-Tiptree ridge that marks the furthest extent of the Anglian ice sheet during the last ice age approximately 450,000 years ago. The geology of the area is rock, sand and gravels that were deposited by the retreating ice. Gravel is commercially extracted from the Royal Oak Quarry with a proposed additional site at Tynedales Farm of 47.5 hectares (117 acres). The National Soil Resources Institute at Cranfield University describes the main soil type as "slowly permeable seasonally wet slightly acid but base-rich loamy and clayey soils."

== Climate ==
Woodham Mortimer is considered by the Met Office to be part of the Eastern England region, however, for the purposes of historical climate data it is consolidated into the East Anglia region. Climate information for the period 1981 – 2010 is detailed below.

Climate data for East Anglia (1981–2010 averages)
Month	Jan	Feb	Mar	Apr	May	Jun	Jul	Aug	Sep	Oct	Nov	Dec	Year
Mean daily maximum °F (°C)	44.8 (7.1)	45.3 (7.4)	50.5 (10.3)	55.6 (13.1)	61.9 (16.6)	67.3 (19.6)	72.0 (22.2)	71.8 (22.1)	66.2 (19.0)	58.5 (14.7)	50.4 (10.2)	45.1 (7.3)	57.6 (14.2)
Mean daily minimum °F (°C)	34.5 (1.4)	34.0 (1.1)	37.0 (2.8)	39.6 (4.2)	44.8 (7.1)	50.0 (10.0)	54.0 (12.2)	53.8 (12.1)	50.2 (10.1)	45.1 (7.3)	39.2 (4.0)	35.1 (1.7)	43.2 (6.2)
Average rainfall inches (mm)	2.09 (53.2)	1.56 (39.7)	1.71 (43.5)	1.76 (44.6)	1.92 (48.8)	2.08 (52.9)	2.03 (51.6)	2.20 (55.8)	2.09 (53.1)	2.56 (64.9)	2.42 (61.4)	2.14 (54.4)	24.6 (624)
Source: Met Office

== Economy ==
There are two public houses, the Royal Oak on the A414 and the Hurdlemakers Arms on Post Office Road. Its name refers to the hurdles which used to be made from materials cut in the nearby woods. There is a golf driving range with 9-hole pitch and putt that was opened in 1967 on Burnham Road. In 2022 planning permission was granted to replace the driving range with a development of 18 houses.

== Crime ==
Woodham Mortimer is policed by Essex Police and is part of the Purleigh Neighbourhood Policing Team which covers a number of areas with a total population of 10,936. In 2011, there were 516 reported crimes in the NPT. There is no local police station.

== Culture and facilities ==
=== Village hall ===
Next to the village hall is a 0.4 hectares (4,000 m^{2}) playing field with swings and a small football pitch.

=== Religious sites ===
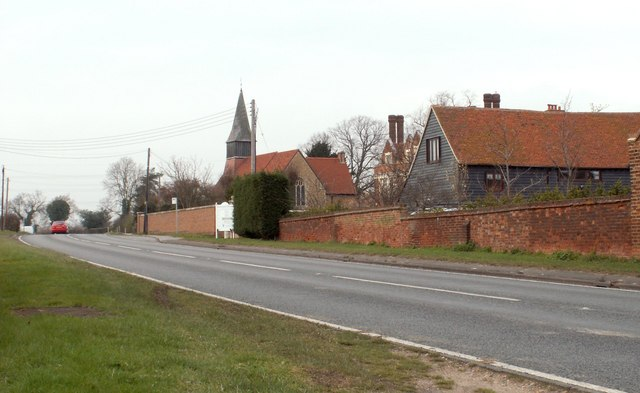
St Margaret's Church, next to Woodham Mortimer Hall, by Robert Edwards

The parish church is St Margaret's. The original church on the site may date from the 16th century, however, it was rebuilt in the 19th century leaving little evidence of the older church with only the south wall and east end remaining.

Evidence for the age of the church includes the 13th century font (although the base is newer) and the 17th century carvings on the pulpit. The church has a small window commemorating Queen Victoria's diamond jubilee. The graveyard includes the grave of Peter Chamberlen.

In 1921 the ecclesiastical parishes of Woodham Mortimer and Hazeleigh were united into a single ecclesiastical parish called "Woodham Mortimer with Hazeleigh". They remain separate civil parishes, although they share a parish council.

=== Landmarks ===
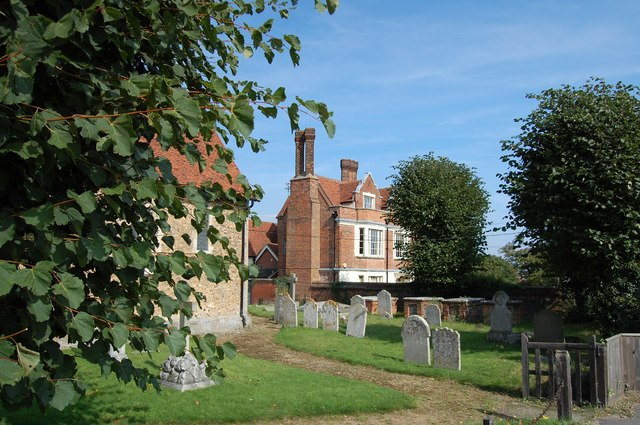
Woodham Mortimer Hall by Trevor Harris

Woodham Mortimer Hall is a 17th-century gabled house that Hugh and Peter Chamberlen lived in. There is a blue plaque fixed to the hall noting them as pioneering obstetricians who invented the forceps. The hall passed out of the Chamberlen family in 1715 when the family home was sold. The forceps were found in 1813 under a trap door in the loft of the hall and given to the Medical and Chirurgical Society which passed them to the Royal Society of Medicine in 1818. The find was described by R. Lee in Observations on the Discovery of the Original Obstetric Instruments of the Chamberlens (1862) as:

The [space] contained some boxes in which were two or three pairs of midwifery forceps, several coins, a medallion of Charles I, or II, a miniature of the Doctor damaged by time, a tooth wrapped in paper, written on, "My husband's last tooth"; some little antique plate; a pair of ladys long yellow kid gloves, in excellent preservation; a small testament date 1645.

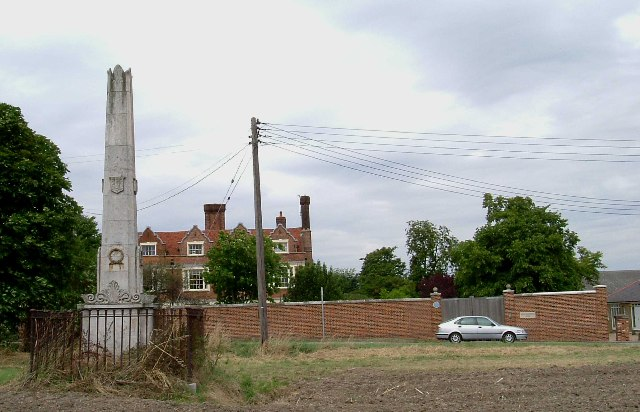
Memorial to William Alexander by Glyn Baker

There is a war memorial commemorating the nine people from the village who died during the World Wars. There is also a Grade II listed memorial erected in 1825 to William Alexander, who left his lands to the Worshipful Company of Coopers for the benefit of the poor.

Woodham Mortimer Lodge is a Grade II listed building.
