= John King (official) =

British politician and statesman

John King (1759–1830) was Under Secretary of State at the Home Office from 1791 and was briefly a Member of Parliament for Enniskillen in 1806.

== Life ==
The fifth son of James King Dean of Raphoe and his wife Anne Walker, he was educated at Eton and matriculated at Christ Church, Oxford in 1777, graduating B.A. in 1781, M.A. in 1784.

King became a Home Office law clerk in January 1791. He had the support of William Grenville, 1st Baron Grenville, at that time Home Secretary, and at the end of the year became Permanent Under-Secretary of State for the Home Department. Under Grenville's successor Henry Dundas, King belonged to the circle gathering government intelligence across departments, including also Richard Ford, Francis Freeling, William Huskisson, Evan Nepean, and William Windham (later Charles William Flint). One surveillance operation in which he was involved was on Alfoxton House in August 1797, where William Wordsworth was staying, and about which James Walsh reported to King because of the presence of John Thelwall, an operation partly prompted by Dr. Daniel Lysons.

Windham, a politician rather than an official, used King (an older Christ Church contemporary) as an intermediary with Grenville in 1792, when entering a covert role. In 1794 Nepean moved on from the Home Office, leaving King the senior of the Under-Secretaries of State, and he started to plan for a future seat in Parliament. After the passing of the Aliens Act 1793, King also worked in the Alien Office. From an initial task of dealing with correspondence, assigned at the end of 1794, he took on further duties as the Alien Office addressed intelligence needs and countered subversion. In 1798 he became a joint superintendent of aliens, with Flint and Wickham. He stayed at the Home Office until 1806, when Grenville became prime minister.

In 1806 King was Secretary to the Treasury, with Nicholas Vansittart. This position required that he have a seat in the House of Commons, to act effectively as patronage secretary for Grenville. Enniskillen was the constituency found for him. King, however, was uncomfortable in Parliament; and asked to be moved. He was replaced at the Treasury, and as MP, by William Henry Fremantle, in September of that year.

Eased out of Parliament, King became comptroller of army accounts, a post he held for the rest of his life.

== Legacy ==
King, Ontario was named after King, by John Graves Simcoe. Port John, on King Island in British Columbia, was named after him by George Vancouver, who had served under his brother, Capt. James King

== Family ==
King married Harriot Moss, daughter of Rt Revd Charles Moss, Bishop of Bath & Wells, in 1792. They had four sons, and nine daughters,

- John James (d. 19 Jul 1867) married Charlotte Wyndham, daughter of George Wyndham, 3rd Earl of Egremont. on 29 Jul 1823. & had issue.
- William Moss (d. 1864), rector of Long Crichel, Dorset, graduated from Christ Church, Oxford in 1817. He married Elizabeth Margaret, daughter of Very Reverend Latham Coddington, Dean of Kilfenora & had issue.
- Marianne (d. 1866) married in 1814 Walter Campbell, of Sandilands, Isle of Islay, & had issue.
- Harriet (d. 1828) married in 1825 William Henry Blaauw. Together with William, she had one daughter
- Caroline Margaret married in 1819, Lt.-Gen. Sir William Cornwallis Eustace, of Sandford Hall, Braintree, and died before 1830, leaving issue.
- Anne Elizabeth (d. 1827) married in 1821, her cousin, Thomas Venables, Private Secretary to Lord Sidmouth & Sir Robert Peel & had issue.
- Katherine Judith (1803-1825) married on 24 Oct 1822, Henry John Adeane of Babraham, Cambridgeshire, & had issue.
- Robert (d. 1846) of Chester Street, London, married his cousin, Georgiana Anne Carleton & had issue.
- Emily (1807-1832) married in 1826 William Henry Harford, of Barley Wood, near Bristol & had issue.
- Elizabeth (d. 1826) was engaged to Brook Henry Bridges, elder son of Reverend Brook Henry Bridges, rector of Danbury, Essex
- Thomas William (d. 1831), Lieutenant., R.N., died unmarried
- Georgiana, d. young
- Eleanor Sophia, d. young
