= Hazeleigh =

Village in Essex, England

Coordinates: 51.702992°N 0.634804°E

- Location within Essex
- Population: 121 (Parish, 2021)
- OS grid reference: TL825035
- District: Maldon
- Shire county: Essex
- Region: East
- Country: England
- Sovereign state: United Kingdom
- Post town: Chelmsford
- Postcode district: CM3
- Dialling code: 01245 & 01621
- Police: Essex
- Fire: Essex
- Ambulance: East of England
- UK Parliament: Witham

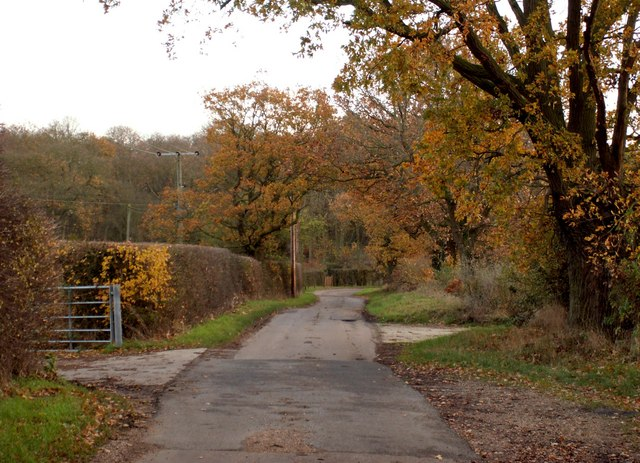
Hazeleigh Hall Lane

Hazeleigh is a village and civil parish on the Dengie peninsula in the English county of Essex. It lies 2.6 miles south-west of Maldon. At the 2021 census the parish had a population of 121. Hazeleigh shares a grouped parish council with the neighbouring parish of Woodham Mortimer.

== Governance ==
There are three tiers of local government covering Hazeleigh, at parish, district, and county level: Woodham Mortimer and Hazeleigh Parish Council, Maldon District Council, and Essex County Council. The parish council is a grouped parish council, also covering the neighbouring parish of Woodham Mortimer. The parish council meets at the village hall on Post Office Road in Woodham Mortimer.

== Churches ==
Hazeleigh's original timber-framed Church, St. Nicholas's, was located in an isolated part of the village, next to the Old Hall, however, by 1900 it had fallen into disuse. Due to its size and lack of windows it was known locally as "the meanest church in England". It was pulled down around 1922, although the last service had been held several years earlier, in 1906. One of the reasons why it fell into disuse was that an iron church was built in a more populous part of the village by the late-Victorian vicar, Rev. William Stuart (brother of Robert Stuart and father of William Horwood Stuart, both diplomats). This iron church was later demolished as well.

In 1921 the ecclesiastical parishes of Woodham Mortimer and Hazeleigh were united into a single ecclesiastical parish called "Woodham Mortimer with Hazeleigh". They remain separate civil parishes, although they share a parish council.
