= Bawley =

Type of English sailboat

A bawley was an English sailing vessel typified by a boomless cutter rig and probably named for having a boiler for cooking shrimp in amidships. "The majority were built by Aldous of Brightlingsea", but they were also built in Harwich, Erith, Southend, Leigh, and on the Medway.

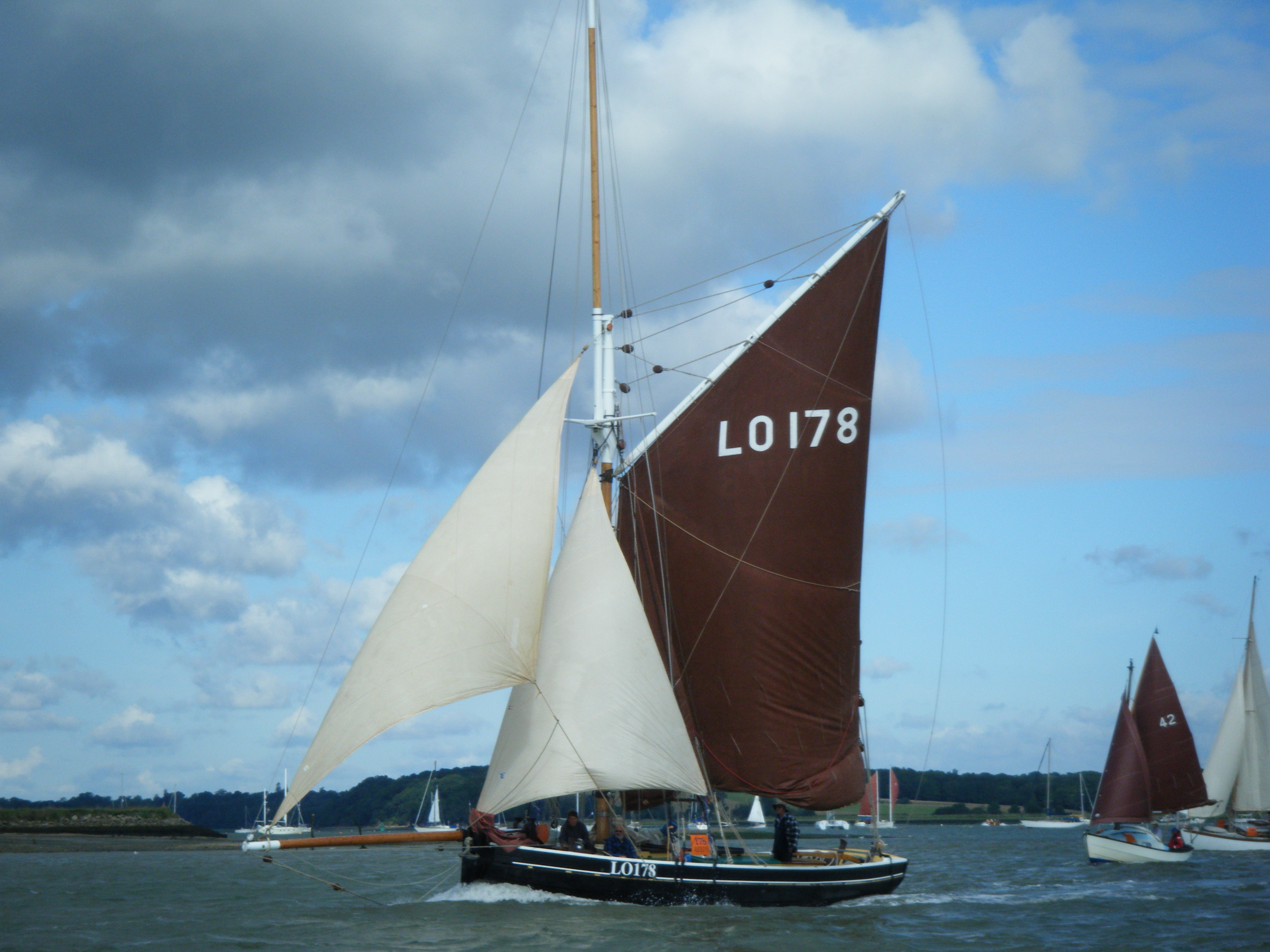
A bawley Bona (LO178) built by Aldous of Brightlingsea in 1903

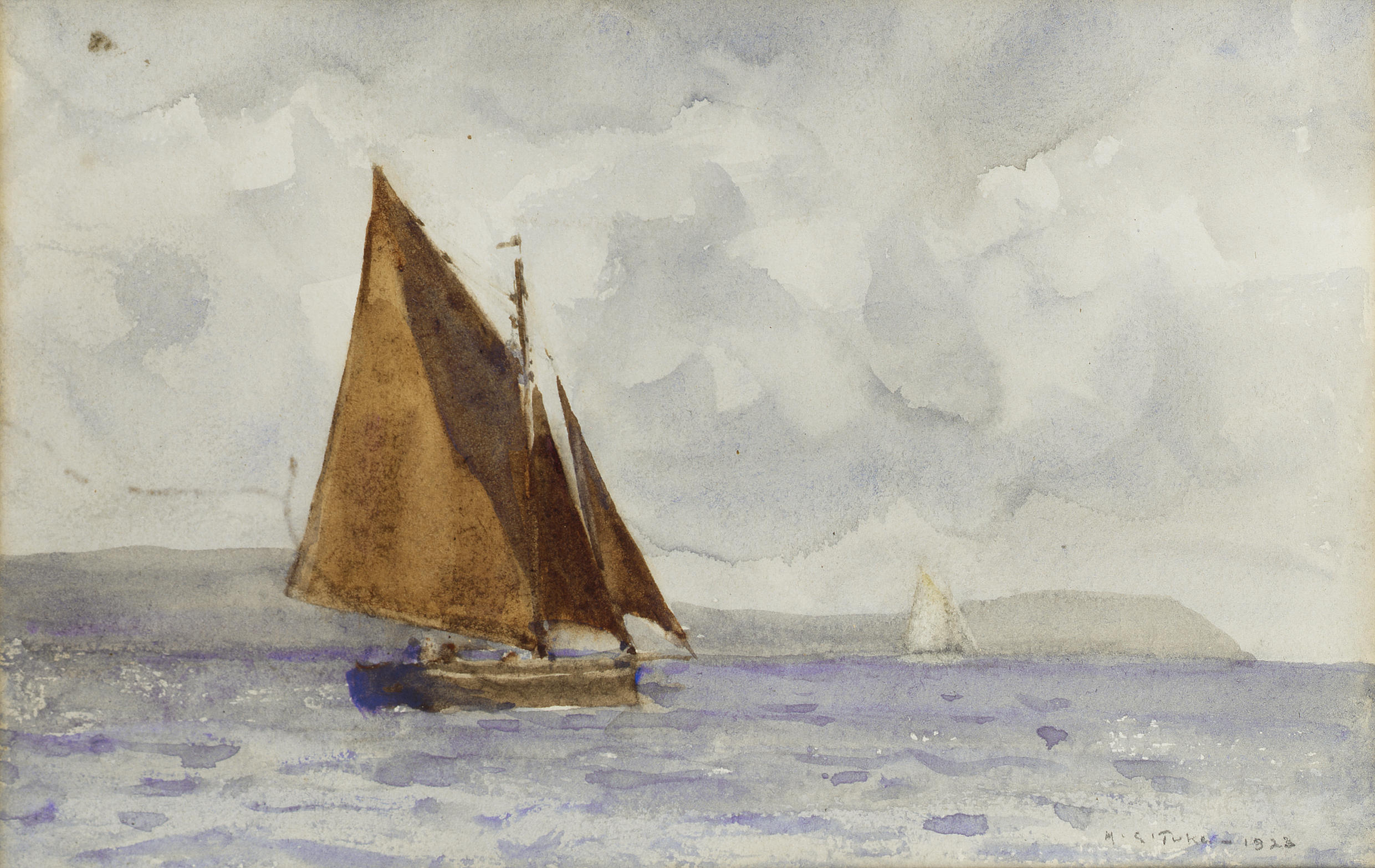
Watercolour of a bawley running up the coast by Henry Scott Tuke, 1858–1929

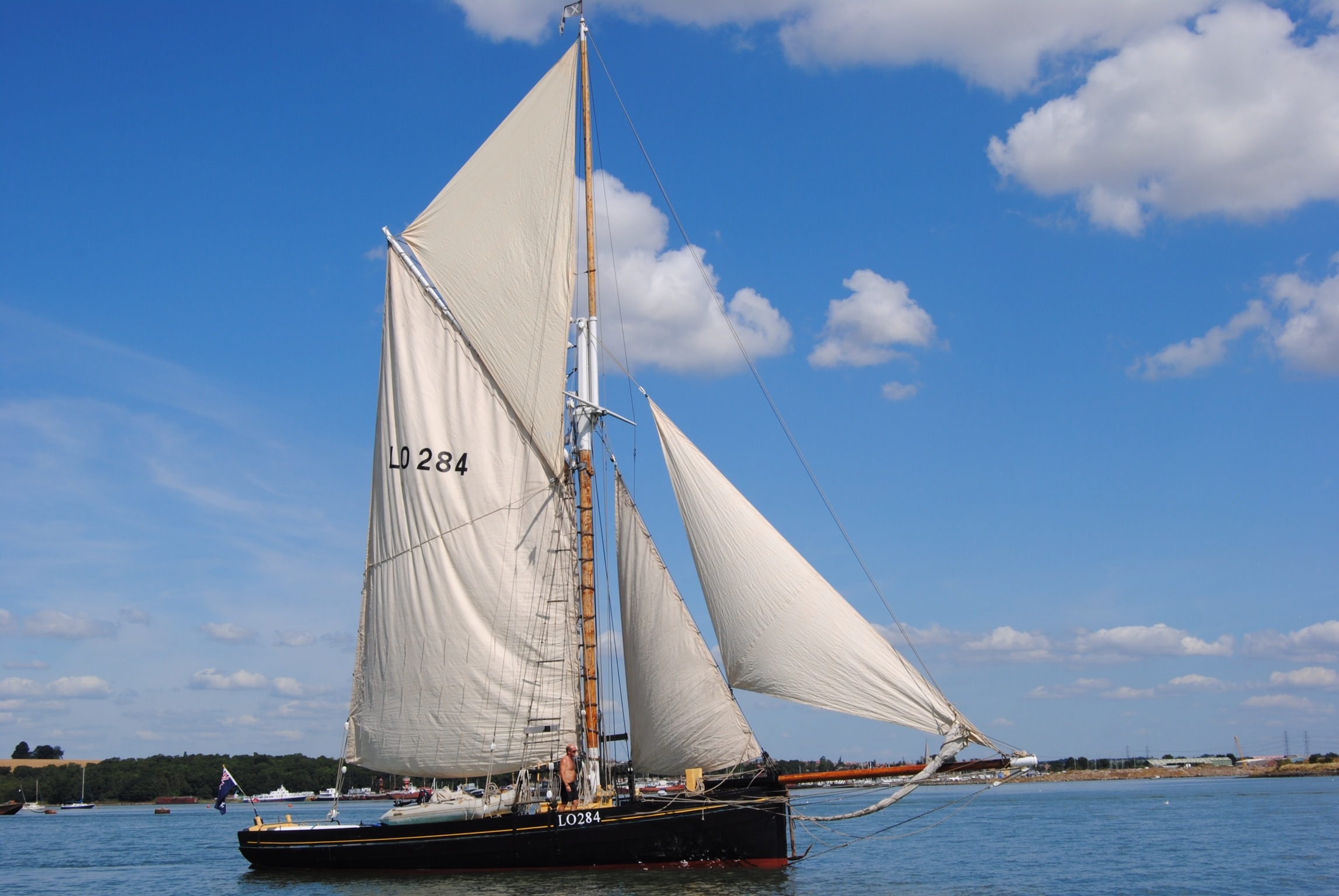
The bawley Doris (LO284) built by John Cann of Harwich in 1909

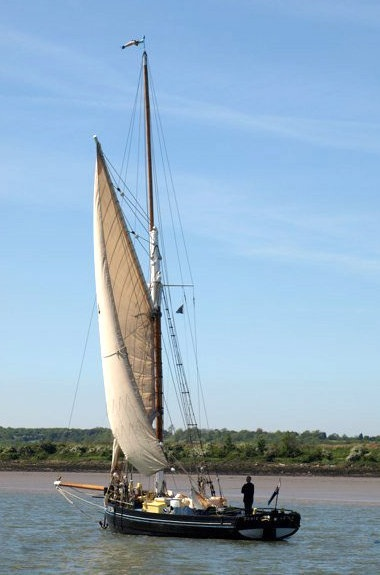
Doris again at Leigh-on-Sea
