= James Stuart (artist) =

Irish surgeon and medical official (1802–1842)

- Born: c. 1802; Ireland
- Died: 26 May 1842; Lake Innes House, Port Macquarie, Colony of New South Wales
- Occupations: Colonial assistant surgeon; artist

James Stuart (c. 1802 – 26 May 1842) was an Irish colonial assistant surgeon and artist of natural history based in the Colony of New South Wales and Norfolk Island.

== Family ==
James Stuart was born c. 1802 in Ireland to Thomas Stuart. Through his father, Stuart was the paternal nephew of Charles Stuart and was the potential grandson of the Irish politician Thomas Smyth. Stuart was one of 8 siblings and was the older brother of the army officer and diplomat Robert Stuart.

Stuart was the uncle of the diplomat and merchant William Horwood Stuart, the footballers Robert Stuart King and Charles King.

== Medical career ==
Stuart arrived in Australia in June 1834 and remained there until his death eight years later. In a letter to his sister Margaret, he recounted his journey "by the ship Jessie from Liverpool, which place we left in December 1833 and after encountering very stormy weather we were obliged to put into Falmouth. We left the latter place in February and after a fine passage we put into Talbot Bay at the beautiful Town of the Cape of Good Hope. From this we sailed to Hobart Town and thence to Sydney, nothing remarkable occurring on the passage except that we were sometimes in danger from the drunkenness and consequent incapacity of our Captain".

He served as colonial assistant surgeon in New South Wales and Norfolk Island. He took charge of the sick who arrived at Sydney on board the emigrant ship Minerva on 24 January 1838. Of the 198 steerage passengers, 86 contracted typhus, 14 of whom died during the passage.

From 1838 to 1840 Stuart was assistant surgeon on Norfolk Island, and by 1841 he was the acting medical officer in charge of the North Head Quarantine Station in Sydney.

== Illustrations ==
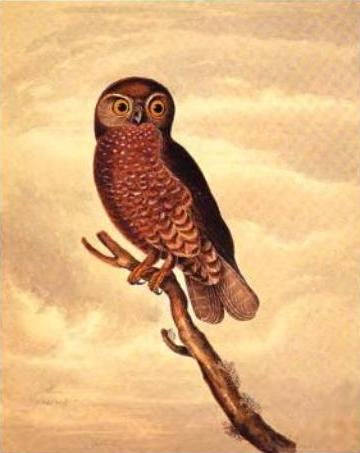
A Norfolk boobook (Stuart, 1839).

Stuart was a keen natural historian and illustrated many species of mammals, birds, insects, fish and plants during his time in Australia.

Many of the drawings were bequeathed to William Sharp Macleay and later given to the Linnean Society of New South Wales. They are now held by the New South Wales state archives and the Mitchell Library.

== Death and legacy ==
On 26 May 1842 Stuart died in Lake Innes House, Port Macquarie, Colony of New South Wales (present-day, Australia.

Two earlier bouts of typhus, presumably contracted from incoming disease-ridden ships, may have hastened his death.

William Sharp Macleay named the brown antechinus (Antechinus stuartii) after him in 1841.
