= James King (priest) =

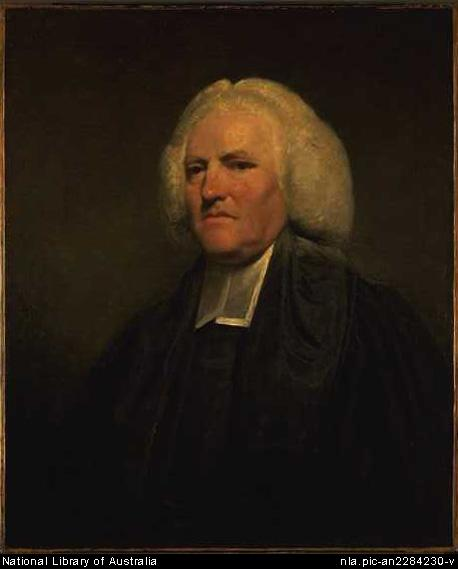
1781 portrait by Joshua Reynolds

James King (1715–1795) was a Canon of Windsor from 1774 to 1776 and Dean of Raphoe from 1776 to 1795.

== Family and early career ==
He was the only surviving son of Thomas King, of Kirkby Malham, Yorkshire, where the family had lived since Rev. Robert King had arrived there as minister in 1573, in the aftermath of the Rising of the North. He attended Ripon Grammar School with his cousin, Fletcher Norton, and then accompanied Norton to St John’s College, Cambridge, where they matriculated in the summer of 1734. He took his B.A. in 1738 and was ordained to a curacy at Hamerton, Huntingdonshire. Two years later he was ordained priest and the following year took his M.A. and moved to another curacy at Barrow upon Soar in Leicestershire. In 1743 he was appointed by Sir Nathaniel Curzon to the perpetual curacy of St Mary Magdalene's Church, Clitheroe, Lancashire. In 1744 he married his cousin, Anne Walker, of Hungerhill, Yorkshire, and they had a family of five sons and one daughter. At Clitheroe he was known as the "keeper of the football" since, on winter Sundays, he held a football in safe keeping, to prevent the game starting until after Evensong, at which point he would kick it from the church gates.

== Later career ==
In 1770 Fletcher Norton, now a successful lawyer, was elected Speaker of the House of Commons and invited King to be his chaplain and, two years later, to take up the post of vicar of St Mary’s and Holy Trinity in Guildford. In 1774 King resigned his Guildford living when he was appointed to the third stall in St George's Chapel, Windsor Castle, and to the rectory of Dunsfold. In 1776 he exchanged these appointments for the deanery of Raphoe in Ireland, a position that he held until his death.

By this time, his family were intimate with Edmund Burke and King was instrumental in keeping Burke in touch with Irish affairs in the run up to the Catholic Relief Acts of 1778 and 1791 and in the appointment of Lord Fitzwilliam as Lord Lieutenant of Ireland in August 1794. He shared Burke’s long time hope for Catholic emancipation in Ireland, which was dashed by Fitzwilliam’s recall in February 1795, shortly before King’s death

His second son, Captain James King, was a friend and companion of Captain James Cook in his last voyage round the world. His third son, Walker King, was Bishop of Rochester and literary executor of Edmund Burke. His fourth son, Edward King, was Vice-Chancellor of the County Palatine of Lancaster. His youngest son, John King, was Under-Secretary of State at the Home Department from 1792 to 1806 and Secretary to the Treasury in Lord Grenville's administration in 1806.

== Legacy ==
George Vancouver served under King's son on the Discovery during the third voyage of Captain Cook. He named features of British Columbia after the family: King Island, Dean Channel and Raphoe Point.

In 1967, King's portrait, painted by Sir Joshua Reynolds in 1781, was sold (with a portrait of his son, James, by John Webber) to the National Library of Australia in Canberra by his descendant, Edward Raleigh King, of Los Angeles. A portrait of King's wife, Ann, painted by James Northcote in 1789, was sold by the same descendant to the Huntington Library in Los Angeles.
