= South Park Street Cemetery =

Cemetery of Kolkata

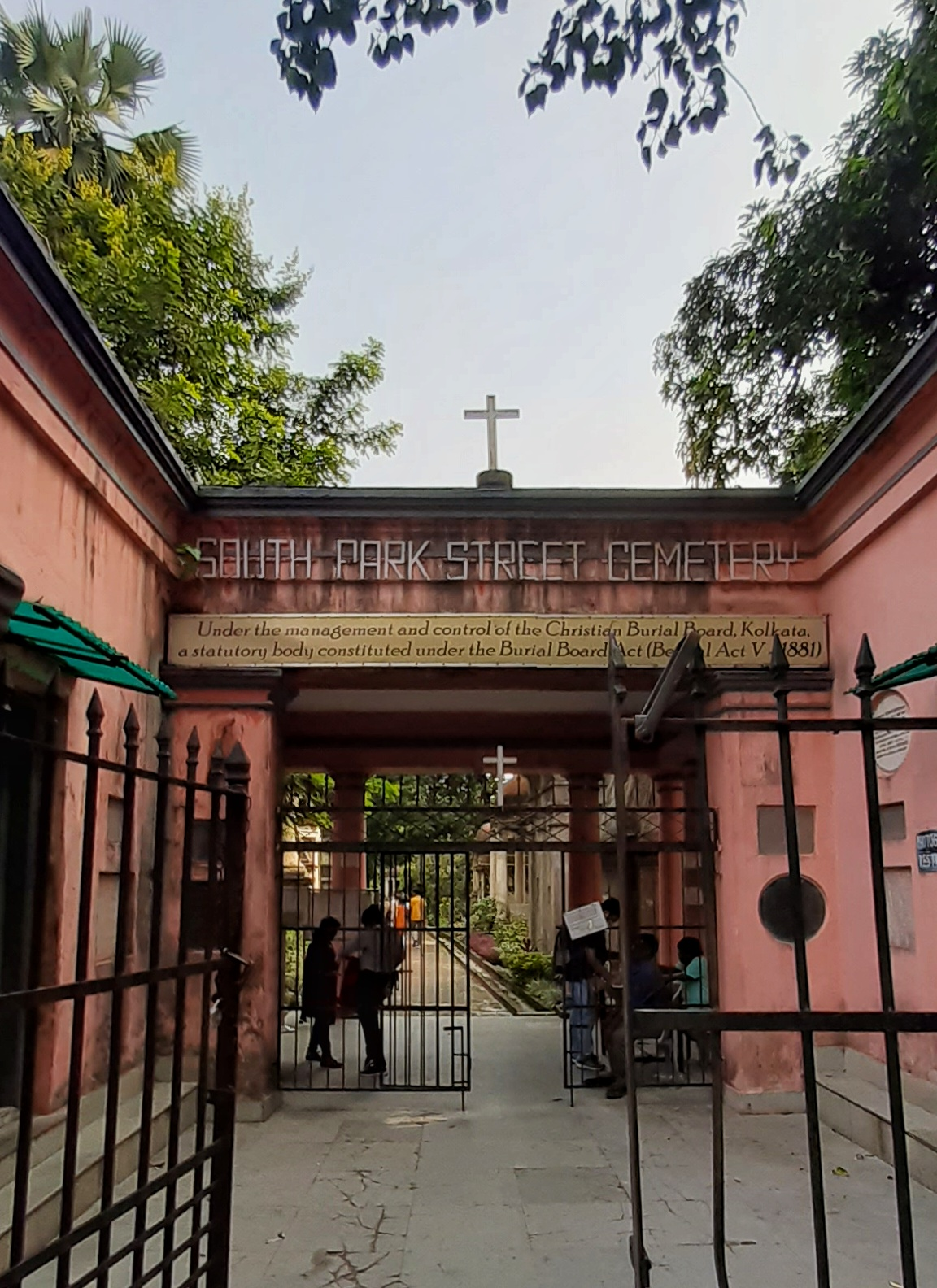
- South Park Street Cemetery main entrance
- Interactive map of South Park Street Cemetery

Details
- Established: 1767; 259 years ago
- Location: Park Street, Kolkata
- Country: India
- Coordinates: 22°32′47″N 88°21′37″E
- Type: Historic
- Owned by: Christian Burial Board, Kolkata

South Park Street Cemetery, is formerly known as the 'Great Christian Burial Ground'. The cemetery houses numerous graves and monuments belonging to British soldiers, administrators, and their families. It is also the final resting place of several prominent personalities, including Henry Louis Vivian Derozio and Sir William Jones. It is located on Mother Teresa Sarani (also known as Park Street), Central Kolkata, India.

== History ==
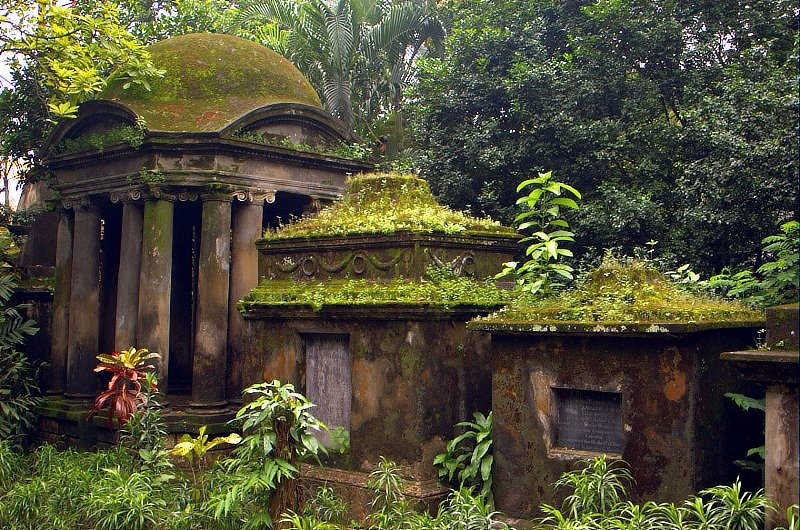
Graves and memorials at the South Park Street Cemetery

The burial ground, along with a new road leading to it, known as the Burial Ground Road, was built in 1767. The cemetery and the road were later renamed Park Street after a private deer park established by Sir Elijah Impey. The burials continued in the 1830s,

After the independence of India, the Park Street cemeteries were decided to be leveled off, as funding for the colonial civil cemeteries were withdrawn. This decision met with resistance from Anglo-Indian citizens of Calcutta. In 1953, the North Park Street Cemetery was decided to be demolished, and the income obtained by leasing the land was used to upkeep the South Park Street Cemetery. In the late 1970s, the cemetery came under the purview of the Association for the Preservation of Historical Cemeteries in India (APHCI) and the Christian Burial Board.

In 1984, Apeejay Trust attempted to demolish the cemetery in order to build an arts center, which was later stopped by an intervention from the Calcutta High Court. Nevertheless, substantial damage had already been done by then, and many graves were lost. The grave of Charles Stuart was destroyed (and was later restored) and the demolition of Derozio's grave had been initiated. In the early 2000s, a restoration project was launched to conserve the cemetery's heritage and prevent its further deterioration.

== Notable tombs ==
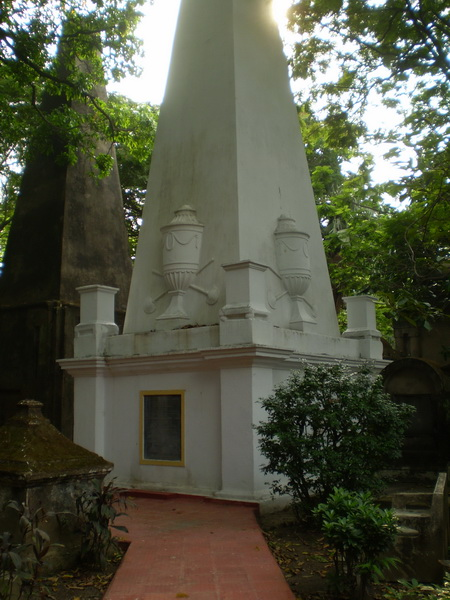
The tomb of Sir William Jones

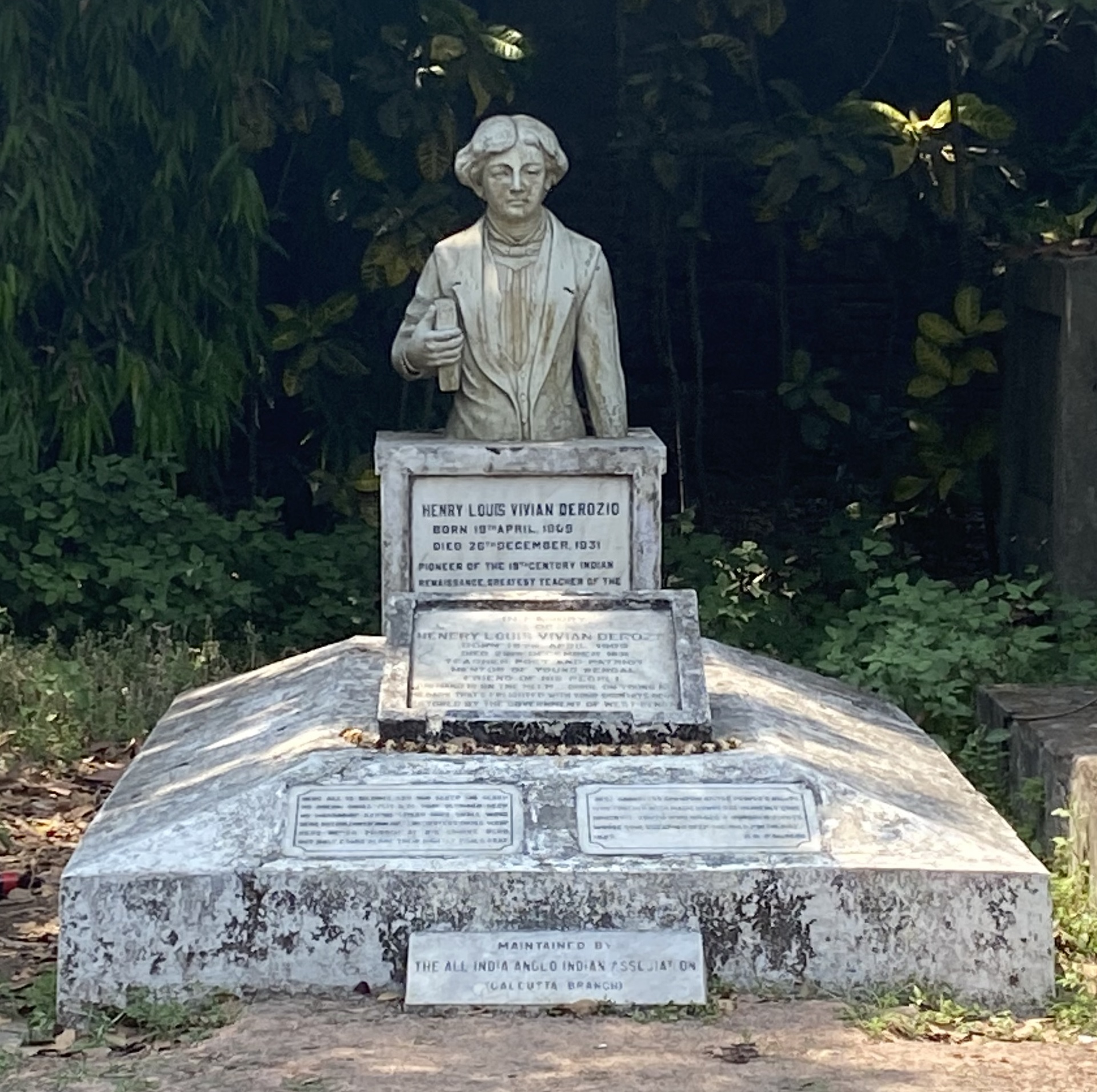
The Grave of Henry Louis Vivian Derozio

- Henry Louis Vivian Derozio (1809–1831), teacher and poet, pioneer of the Young Bengal movement
- Sir William Jones (1746–1794), philologist and scholar, founder of the Asiatic Society
- Lieutenant-General Sir John Clavering (c.1722–1777), army officer and diplomat
- Augustus Cleveland (1754-1784), colonial administrator
- Captain Edward Cooke (1772–1799), Royal Navy officer
- George Bogle (1746–1781), diplomat
- Colonel Robert Kyd (1746–1793), founder of the Indian Botanic Garden
- Lieutenant-Colonel Colin Mackenzie (1754–1821), Surveyor General of India
- Lieutenant-Colonel Valentine Blacker (1778-1826), Surveyor General of India
- Sir John Hadley D'Oyly, 6th Baronet (1754–1818), politician
- Major-General Charles Stuart (1758–1828), army officer and Indophile, popularly known as “Hindoo Stuart”
- Walter Landor Dickens, son of English novelist Charles Dickens. He was buried initially in Bhowanipore war cemetery, and the tombstone was later moved here in 1987.
- Grave no. 363 of an unknown woman (d. 1825) whose epitaph reads “A virtuous mother”.

== Architecture ==
The cemetery is considered to be an important example of colonial-era architecture, with its Gothic-style tombs and monuments, mixed with the rich flavor of the Greek, Egyptian, and Indo-Saracenic styles. In certain instances, elements from Hindu architecture and Islamic tombs have also been adopted. Many of the monuments in the cemetery are adorned with intricate carvings, sculptures, and epitaphs. The structures are primarily constructed of sandstone, marble, and bricks, and feature a variety of shapes and sizes, ranging from simple headstones to grand mausoleums.

== Gallery ==
South Park Street Cemetery

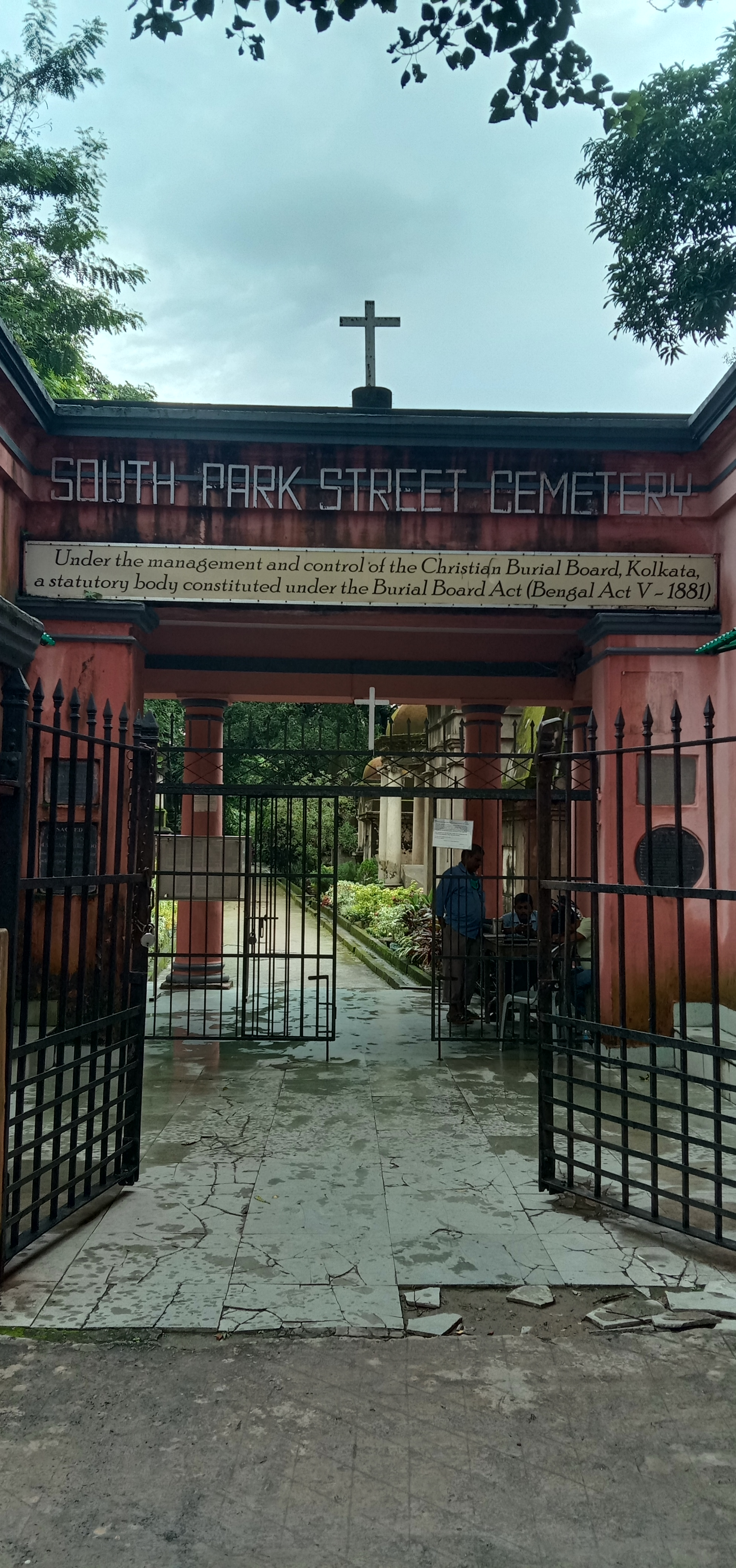
Main gate

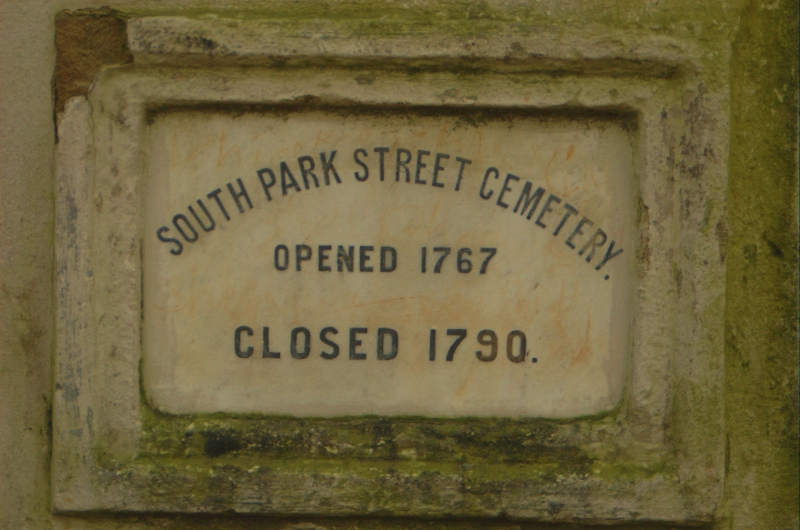
The marble plaque which reads: "South Park Street Cemetery, opened 1767, closed 1790"

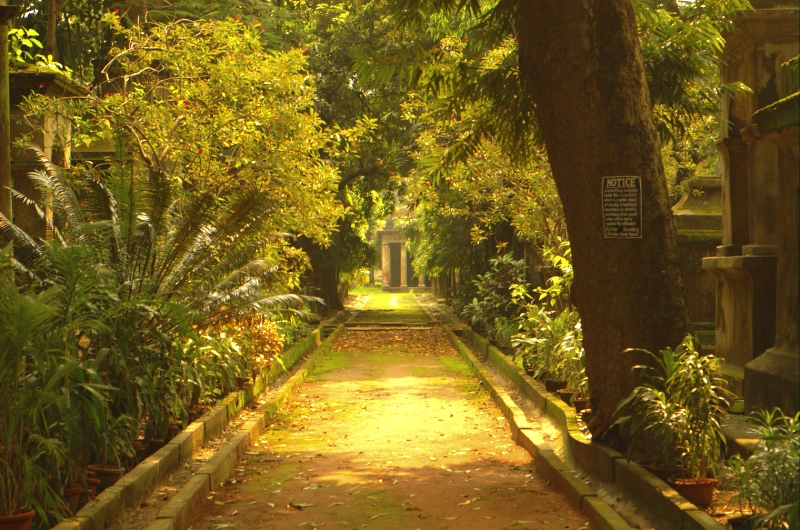
The pavilions inside the cemetery

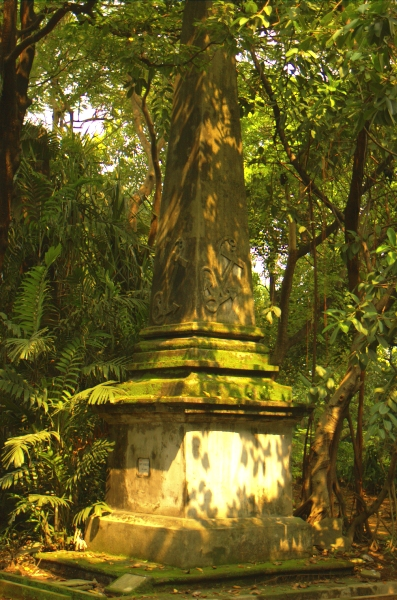
A tomb inside the cemetery

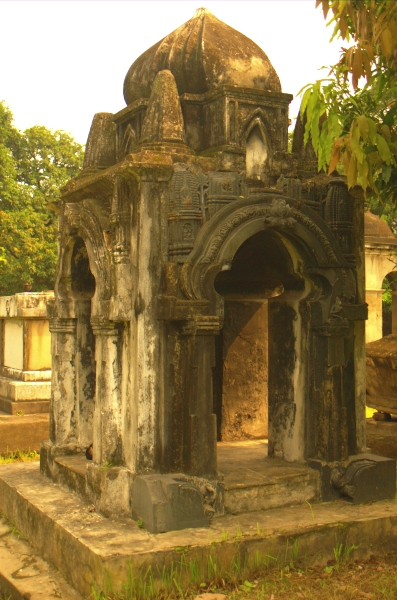
The tomb of Charles Stuart, known as "Hindoo Stuart"

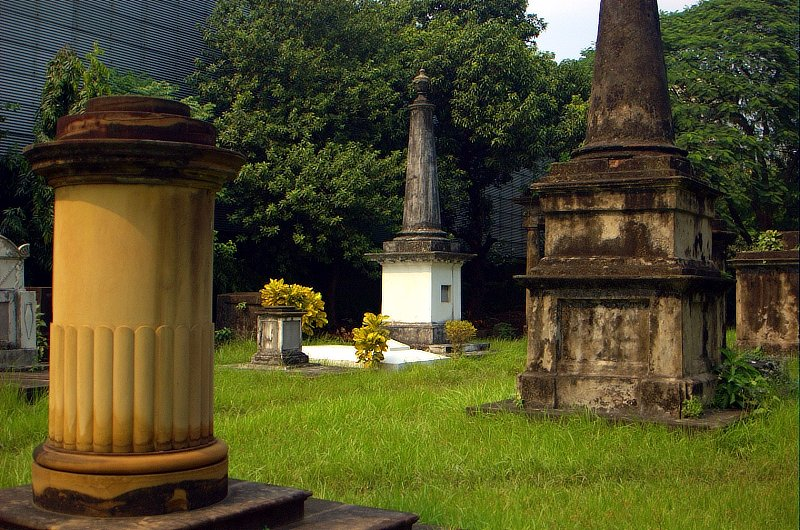
The tombs inside the cemetery

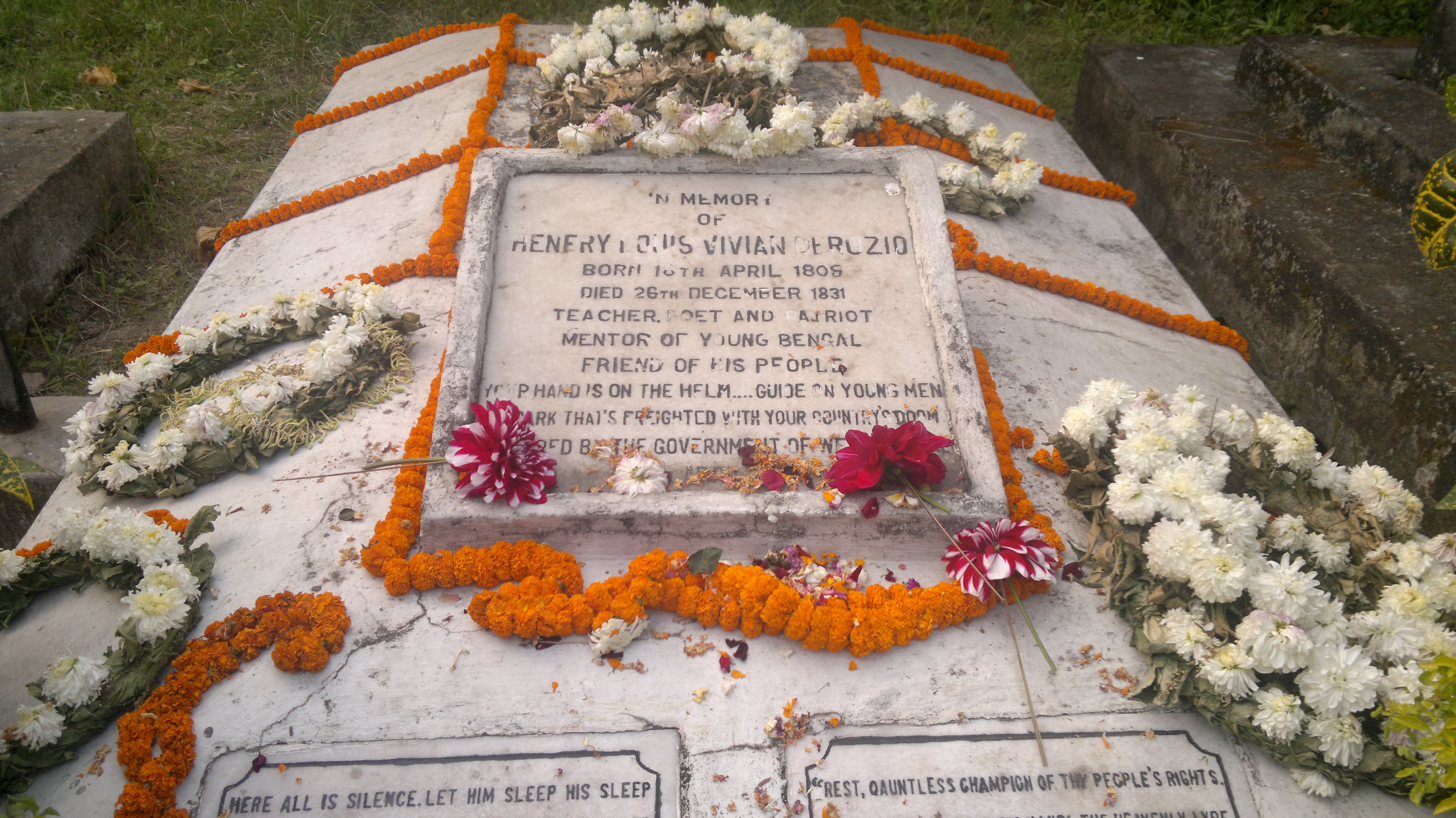
Tomb of Sir Henry Vivian Derozio
