= Open city (disambiguation) =

An open city is a city that is declared demilitarized during a war, entitling it to immunity from attack under international law.

Open City may also refer to:

- OpenCity, a free open-source game
- Open City, an online magazine operated by the Asian American Writers' Workshop
- Open City, the company which published RealTime, an Australian arts magazine
- Open City (film), a 2008 South Korean film
- Open City (magazine), a New York City-based magazine
- Open City (newspaper), a defunct Los Angeles underground newspaper
- Open City (novel), a 2012 novel by Teju Cole

== See also ==
- Rome, Open City, a 1945 Roberto Rossellini film
