= Walker King (priest) =

Archdeacon of Rochester (1798–1859)

Walker King (born Marylebone 24 May 1798 – died Stone, Kent 20 March 1859) was Archdeacon of Rochester from 6 July 1827 until his death.

The son of Walker King, Bishop of Rochester, he was educated at Oriel College, Oxford and served as Vicar of Holy Trinity Church, Dartford, and Rector of Stone, Kent. His son was Bishop of Lincoln.
