= St Clement's Church, Leigh-on-Sea =

Coordinates: 51°32′29″N 0°39′15″E

St Clement’s Church, Leigh-on-Sea
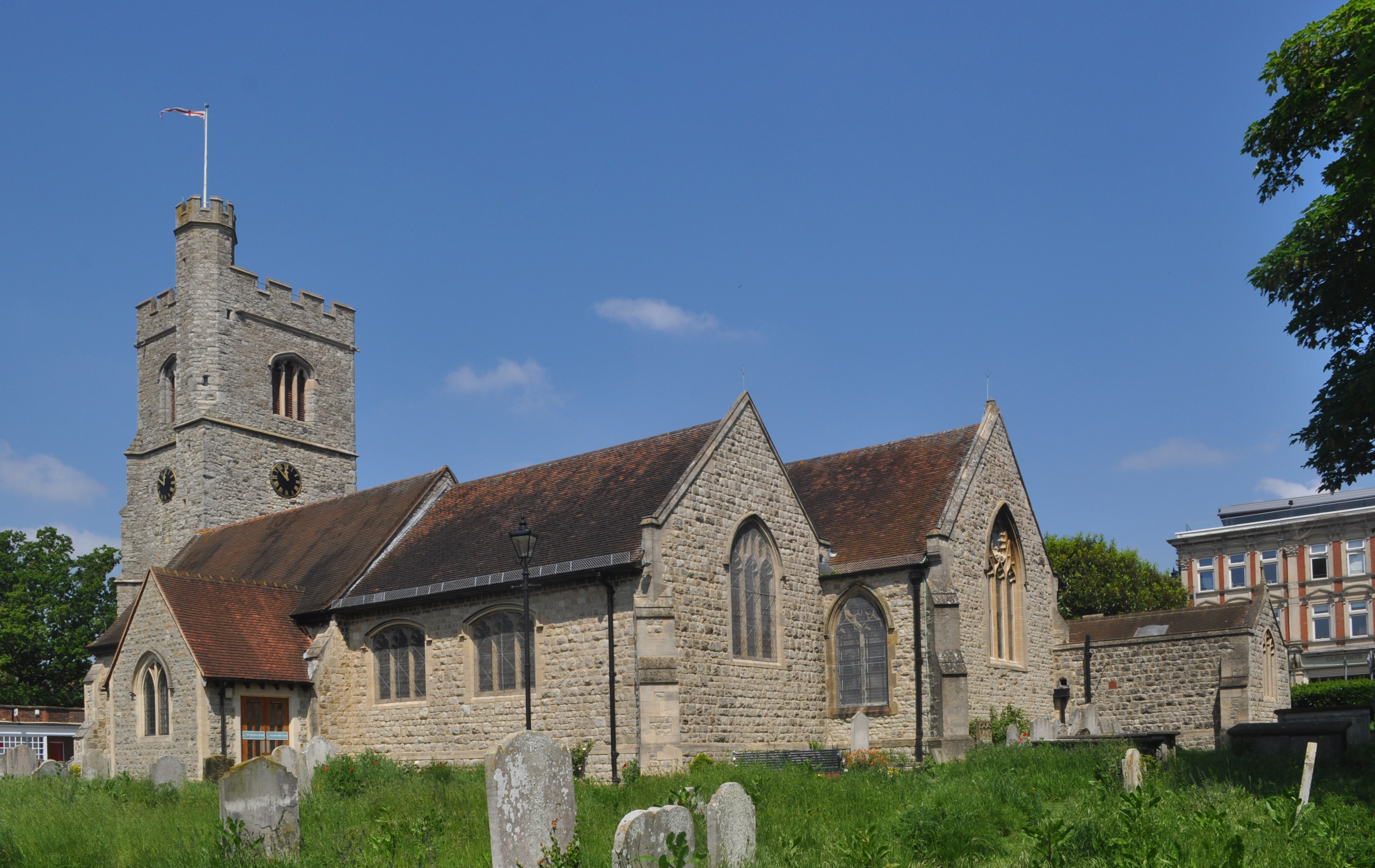
- St Clement’s Church, Leigh-on-Sea
- Location: Leigh-on-Sea, Essex
- Country: England
- Denomination: Church of England
- Churchmanship: Anglo-Catholic
- Website: Parish website

History
- Status: Active

Architecture
- Functional status: Parish church
- Heritage designation: Grade II* listed
- Designated: 23 November 1951
- Architect(s): C. F. Haywood, Ernest Geldart, Sir Charles Nicholson

Administration
- Diocese: Diocese of Chelmsford
- Archdeaconry: Archdeaconry of Southend
- Deanery: Hadleigh
- Parish: Leigh-on-Sea

St Clement's Church is a parish church affiliated with the Church of England in Leigh-on-Sea, Essex. It is a Grade II* listed building dedicated to Saint Clement of Rome, a 1st-century martyr and patron saint of mariners.

== History ==
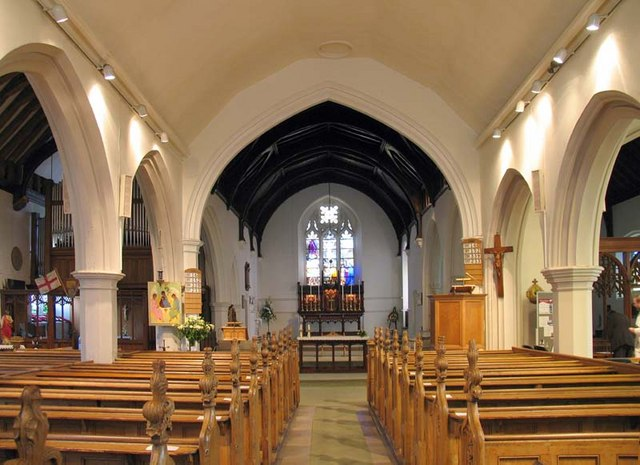
St Clement's Church chancel and nave.

The church, with its 80-foot west tower, sits in a prominent position on a hilltop overlooking the town harbour, and was traditionally an important landmark along the Thames Estuary. It was rebuilt using Kentish ragstone and flint rubble in the late 15th or early 16th on the site of a previous church, possibly dating back to the 13th century. The 14th-century chancel may also have survived the rebuilding, along with a pre-Reformation piscina near the altar. A brick porch was added in the Tudor period.

At various times since then, the church has been altered or extended, mostly notably between 1837 and 1840 under the rector, Rev. Robert Eden. In 1872 the chancel was extended eastwards by the architect C. F. Haywood, and the south aisle was added by Ernest Geldart in 1897 as the population of Leigh-on-Sea continued to grow. The lady chapel, designed in 1913 by Sir Charles Nicholson, was added as a memorial to Rt. Rev. Edward King, a former Bishop of Lincoln and uncle of the rector at the time, Rev. Canon Robert Stuart King. King had succeeded his father as rector, and between them they served the parish for over 90 years.

The church contains a number of stained glass windows, including work by Frederick Preedy, Franz Mayer & Co. and James Powell and Sons. The chancel reredos and lady chapel screen were designed by Geldart and the war memorial by Nicholson. The 15th century font was originally at St Swithin's Church in Norwich.

The tomb chest of Mary Haddock, who named the Captain Haddock character in The Adventures of Tintin series, and the tomb chest of her father William Goodlad, the admiral of the English whaling fleet, were grade II listed in 2024 by Historic England, as was a third tomb, erected in 1609, to Mary Ellis, who is said to have lived to 119 years old.

== Present day ==
The parish of Leigh-on-Sea is in the Archdeaconry of Southend of the Diocese of Chelmsford. St Clement's Church stands in the Anglo-Catholic tradition of the Church of England and holds several services each week.

== Leigh Rectory ==
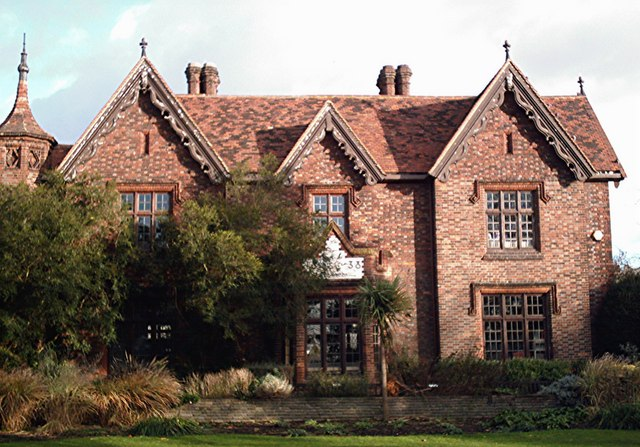
Leigh Rectory, now Leigh Library.

Leigh Rectory was commissioned by Rev. Robert Eden after he became rector in 1837. Located on Broadway, it was completed in 1838, replacing an older rectory erected under Rev. John Davey Hodge. As well as the construction of the rectory building and gardens on a 6-acre site, the work involved the creation of Rectory Grove as a public right of way, replacing a cliff-top path called Chess Lane.

The building now serves as the town library but is only one-quarter of its original size, the rest having been demolished after it was acquired by Southend Corporation.

== Rectors ==
The earliest name on the list of rectors at St Clement's Church dates from 1248 Other early rectors include Rev. John Sym (c. 1581–1638), a Scottish-born Calvinist who was the author of Lifes Preservative Against Self-Killing (1637).

The following have served as rector of Leigh-on-Sea since the Restoration:

- 1661: Rev. John Fflower
- 1667: Rev. William Secker
- 1681: Rev. William Thompson
- 1699: Rev. Dr. Alexander Leask
- 1701: Rev. Francis Fordyce
- 1726: Rev. Roger Price
- 1762: Rev. Dr. William Parker
- 1763: Rev. Henry Willes
- 1777: Rev. Matthew Hodge
- 1793: Rev. John Davey Hodge
- 1808: Rev. Edward Newton Walter
- 1837: Rev. Robert Eden, later Bishop of Moray, Ross and Caithness
- 1852: Rev. Christopher Robert Harrison
- 1855: Rev. Frederick William Murray
- 1859: Rev. Canon Walker King
- 1892: Rev. Canon Robert Stuart King
- 1950: Rev. John Head
- 1973: Rev. Raymond Smith
- 1986: Rev. Stephen Jones
- 2001: Rev. Kenneth Havey
- 2014: Rev. Clive Hillman
- 2024 - present: Rev. Myles Owen
