= James King (Royal Navy officer) =

Royal Navy officer (1750–1784)

Captain James King FRS
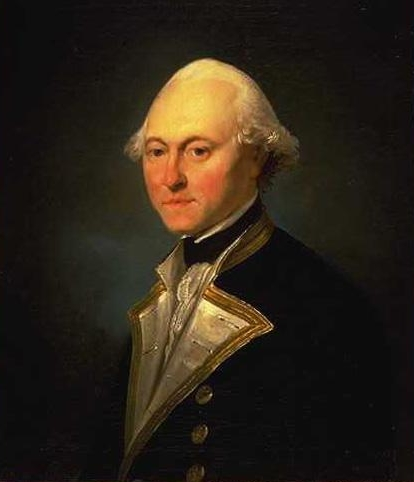
- King in 1782
- Born: 1750; Clitheroe, Lancashire, Great Britain
- Died: 16 November 1784 (aged 34); Nice, France
- Burial place: Nice, France
- Military career
- Allegiance: Kingdom of Great Britain
- Branch: Royal Navy
- Service years: 1762–1784
- Rank: Post captain
- Commands: HMS Discovery; HMS Crocodile; HMS Resistance
- Conflicts: American War of Independence

Captain James King FRS (1750 – 16 November 1784) was an officer of the Royal Navy. He served under James Cook on his last voyage around the world, specialising in taking important astronomical readings using a sextant. After Cook died he helped lead the ships on the remainder of their course, also completing Cook's account of the voyage. He continued his career in the Navy, reaching the rank of post-captain, commanding several ships and serving in the American War of Independence.

== Early life ==
King was born in Clitheroe, Lancashire, in 1750, the son of James King, who was at that time curate of St Mary Magdalene, Clitheroe. According to the parish registers young James King was baptised on 13 July 1750, presumably shortly after his birth. At an early age King entered Clitheroe Royal Grammar School, where he remained until he was 12 years old.

== The Navy ==
King entered the navy on 19 November 1762 under the patronage of his kinsman William Norton, serving under him first in HMS Assistance as an able seaman, although in fact he was treated as a junior officer, and then as a midshipman in the William and Mary. After further service as an able seaman or midshipman in HMS Gibraltar and HMS Liverpool, King joined HMS Guernsey, Captain James Chads, on 15 March 1768 as an able seaman for service on the Newfoundland Station under Hugh Palliser, a commodore and friend and patron of James Cook, but there is no indication that Cook and King met at this time. It has been said that King served aboard HMS Alarm in the Mediterranean under Captain John Jervis but there is no evidence of this.

Having passed for lieutenant on 7 March 1769, King was promoted to this rank on 10 January 1771, serving in several ships before being placed on half pay in May 1773. He was then granted leave to go abroad on his private affairs for one year, visiting Paris before joining his elder brother Thomas in Auxerre. This was followed by a period with his brother Walker King at Corpus Christi College, Oxford, where he was introduced to Thomas Hornsby, a priest and Savilian Professor of Astronomy, by his father's first cousin, Fletcher Norton, 1st Baron Grantley, Speaker of the House of Commons and member of the Board of Longitude, who recommended him for Cook's third voyage.

== Service on Captain Cook's third voyage, 1776-1780 ==
King joined HMS Resolution as second lieutenant, sharing the duties of astronomer with Cook, taking astronomical observations on board by sextant and with Larcum Kendall's timekeeper K1, to establish the Resolution's position at sea and on shore by sextant or by astronomical quadrant to establish the geographical position of salient points during the course of Cook's surveys. Thus King's geographical positions were an important contribution to the accuracy of the various surveys carried out during the voyage and his use of the early chronometers helped prove their use at sea for calculation of longitude.

During the return voyage, the Resolution spent several months in Hawaii, during which time the Hawaiian monarch Kalaniʻōpuʻu became very fond of King, perhaps thinking King was Cook's own son, and tried to entice him to desert, with the aim of adopting him and making him a de facto Hawaiian prince. King refused the offer, but Kalaniʻōpuʻu insisted, pressing the point with Cook to allow King to stay. Cook refused, noting how important King was to their mission, but dissembled, saying he could bring King back the following year. The event occurred just days before Cook was killed.

Following the death of Cook, King remained in the Resolution but on the death of Charles Clerke, Cook's successor, King was appointed to command HMS Discovery, the Resolution's consort, remaining in her for the rest of the voyage. After his return to England King was very much involved in the publication of the official account of Cook's third voyage, writing the third volume at Woodstock, near Oxford, where his brother Thomas was rector of St Mary Magdalene. But shortly after his return King was promoted Post-captain and appointed commander of HMS Crocodile in the English Channel.

== Later life ==
Then towards the end of 1781 King was appointed commander of the 40-gun HMS Resistance and escorted a fleet of merchantmen to the West Indies. He captured a French frigate, La Coquette, off Turks Island before returning to England at the end of the American Revolutionary War in 1783 with his health much impaired. King then returned to Woodstock to continue to work on documenting Cook's third voyage. After the publication of the three-volume account of the voyage, advancing tuberculosis drove him to Nice, accompanied by his friends James Trevenen, who had served with him in the Resolution and Discovery, and Captain William Young, who had served with him in the Guernsey, where he died on 16 November 1784 at the age of 34, although the memorial tablet in Woodstock parish church states erroneously that he died in his 32nd year. He was made a Fellow of the Royal Society and in 1782 in recognition of his astronomical observations during Cook's third voyage he was also made an honorary L.L.D. Trinity College, Dublin, after donating his collection of Pacific artefacts to the college.

King Island in British Columbia was named in 1793 by George Vancouver, in honour of the family of Captain James King, under whom Vancouver had served as a midshipman on the Discovery during the latter part of the third voyage of James Cook.

== Bibliography ==
- Sides, Hampton (2024). The Wide Wide Sea: Imperial Ambition, First Contact, and the Fateful Final Voyage of Captain James Cook. Doubleday. ISBN 9780385544764.
