= Charles Stuart (East India Company officer) =

Irish East India Company general

- Born: c. 1757–1758; Dublin or Galway, Ireland
- Died: 31 March 1828; Calcutta, British India
- Burial place: South Park Street Cemetery, Calcutta
- Relatives: Thomas Smyth (alleged father); Robert Stuart (nephew); James Stuart (nephew); Robert King (great-nephew)
- Military career
- Allegiance: British Empire; British India
- Rank: Major General
- Nickname: Hindoo Stuart

Charles Stuart (c. 1757–1758 – 31 March 1828), known by the nickname Hindoo Stuart, was an Irish officer in the East India Company Army, known for being one of a few officers to embrace Hindu culture. He also wrote books and several newspaper articles extolling Hindu culture and tradition and urging its adoption by Europeans settled in India, and deploring the attitudes and activities of the Utilitarians and missionaries who deprecated Indian culture.

== Background and family ==
Stuart was born in either 1757 or 1758 in Dublin or Galway. Stuart was potentially one of four illegitimate children of the Irish politician Thomas Smyth.

His nephews included the diplomat Robert Stuart and the naturalist and surgeon James Stuart. The clergyman and footballer Robert King was his great-nephew.

Little is known of his early life, but his later writings demonstrate that he may have had a classical education, learning Latin and poetry.

== In India ==
At the age of 19, Stuart left for India, where he remained for the rest of his life. He served in the army of the East India Company and starting as a cadet, he rose through the ranks. By 1803 he was a Lieutenant-Colonel, although there are no records of him participating in any of the Company's major battles.

In 1798, he writes his first known tract, called Observations and Remarks on the Dress, Discipline, Etc. of the Military, published anonymously. In it, he argues that the army should learn from Indians and adopt aspects of Indian dress and weaponry, saying, "Perhaps we have too long persisted in many inconvenient and unbecoming modes, because they are European- not reflecting, how naturally manners change with climes."

Stuart enthusiastically embraced Hindu culture and championed the same in his writings and discourse, which earned him the nickname Hindoo Stuart. V. C. P. Hodson's biography of Stuart mentions that he "had studied the language, manners, and customs of the natives of this country with so much enthusiasm, his intimacy with them ... obtained for him the name of Hindoo Stuart".

Stuart took to Hinduism both in its religious aspects and as a way of daily life. He adopted many Hindu customs and routines of daily life, including bathing in the Ganges at Calcutta every morning. He had been addressed as "Pandit Stuart" by William Linnaeus Gardner, who mentioned that Stuart performed pooja regularly, "avoided the sight of beef" and had even attended the Kumbh Mela.

He amassed a collection of Hindu deities and icons of worship. Archie Baron says, in his book An India Affair:

"It was far easier to break into Muslim society than the exclusive and mysterious world of brahminical Hinduism which makes 'Hindoo Stuart' a rarity even among White Moghuls... His Hinduism was on open display to the whole of Calcutta. As far as one can tell, this does not seem to have set back his career".

He quickly took to wearing Indian clothes, and this became his normal garb when off the parade ground. He encouraged his Indian sepoys to wear full moustaches in the Indian style on parade. His commander-in-chief "ticked him off" due to his partiality towards sepoys sporting "Rajput moustaches or brightly coloured caste marks on their foreheads". Declaring Indian garments best suited to the weather of India, he actively promoted their adoption by Europeans settled in India. He wrote newspaper articles on this subject frequently ("frequent and vigorous" contributions to the daily Calcutta Telegraph in the year 1800) and strongly encouraged European ladies in India to adopt the sari.

Stuart published his letters extolling the virtues of "elegant, simple, sensible, and sensual" Indian saris vis-a-vis "the prodigious structural engineering Europeon (sic) women strapped themselves into, in order to hold their bellies in, project their breasts out and allow their dresses to balloon grandly up and over towards the floor" along with some replies by "outraged" white women in a "deliciously silly volume" entitled The Ladies Monitor, Being A Series of Letters First published in Bengal on the Subject of Female Apparel Tending to Favour a regulated adoption of Indian Costume And a rejection of Superfluous Vesture By the Ladies of this country With Incidental remarks on Hindoo Beauty, Whale-Bone Stays, Iron Busks, Indian Corsets, Man-Milliners, Idle Bachelors, Hair-Powder, Waiting Maids, And Footmen. Some of the reasons he cites for European women to give up iron busks are: Firstly wearing iron busks makes women highly susceptible to lightning strikes (exhorting them with sentences such as "This is no laughing matter ladies for I am absolutely serious"). Secondly, by discarding iron busks from their wardrobes, European women would immensely enhance the supply of iron in Bengal for farmers who desperately need new wagon wheels.

In 1804, Stuart leaves for the British Isles, returning to India in 1809. During this period, his pay goes from almost £2000 a year to only 20 shillings a day, an amount which stopped altogether from the end of 1806.

In his book Vindication of the Hindoos (1808), Stuart criticised the work of European missionaries in India, claiming that: "Hinduism little needs the meliorating hand of Christianity to render its votaries a sufficiently correct and moral people for all the useful purposes of a civilised society." In this book. Stuart defends Hinduism from assaults by missionaries explaining: "Wherever I look around me, in the vast ocean of Hindu mythology, I discover Piety... Morality... and as far as I can rely on my judgement, it appears the most complete and ample system of Moral Allegory that the world has ever produced." Throughout this book Stuart, warns of the dangers of the "obnoxious" missionaries and of attempts to convert Indians to Christianity, a process he describes as "impolitic, inexpedient, dangerous, unwise and insane". He asks "if their religion is insulted what confidence can we repose in the fidelity of our Hindu soldiers?" presaging, it is said, some of the causes of the Mutiny of 1857.

Upon his return to India in 1809, Stuart begins once more to rise through the ranks of the East India Company, becoming Colonel in 1811 and Major-General in 1814.

During his lifetime, Stuart amassed a large collection of Indian, South Asian, Indonesian, Australian and New Zealand objects, including statues, weaponry, armour, furniture, and books in his home on Wood Street in Chowringhee, Kolkata. This was opened to the public, although no contemporaries record visiting it. The highlight of the collection was hundreds of Hindu, Buddhist and Jain sculptures from around India. Some of these objects may have been gotten by illicit means- in 1810, the Asiatic Society of Bengal received a donation of two inscriptions from Bhubaneswar from a "General Stewart" which were later found to have been cut from working temples. These were later returned.

== Legacy ==
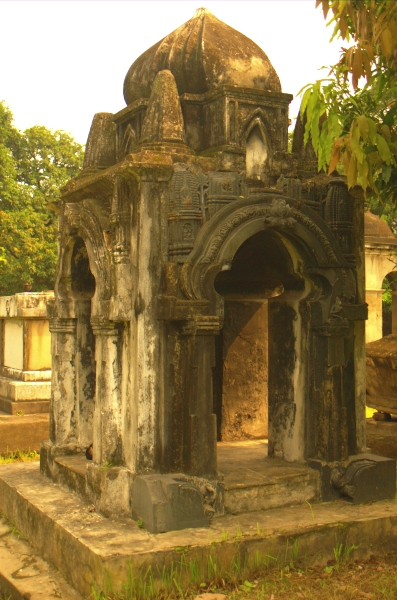
Tomb of Charles Stuart at the South Park Street Cemetery in Kolkata.

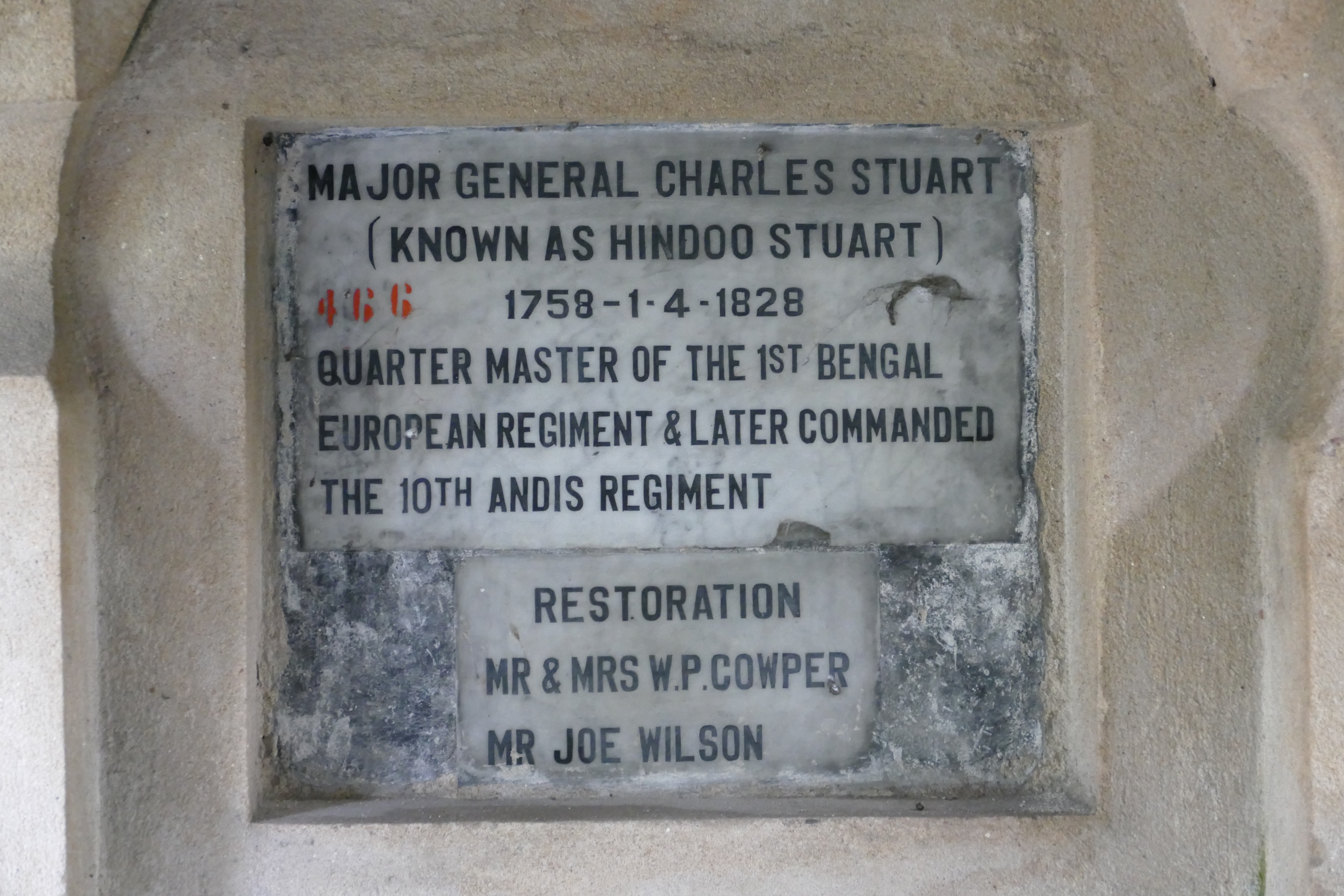
Epitaph of Stuart at the South Park Street Cemetery in Kolkata

Though Stuart often spoke of his conversion to Hinduism he had not entirely rejected Christian doctrines as he held the Hindu deity Krishna to be the Spirit of God who descends upon earth for the benefit of mankind which he believed was "not very inconsistent with Christianity" and "he was content to be buried in an Anglican cemetery, albeit along with his favourite idols".

Stuart died on 31 March 1828 and was buried with his deities at the South Park Street Cemetery in Calcutta, in a tomb which took the form of a Hindu temple. In his will, he leaves most of his estate to his Irish siblings, with smaller amounts to his Indian servants.

Upon Stuart's death, his collection of antiquities was sold off at Christie's auction house in London. Most of it was bought by J. Bridge, and upon his death it was donated to the British Museum as part of the Bridge Collection. In 2018, Indian news site Rediff.com contacted the British Museum to ask about the return of one piece of the collection, a sandstone sculpture of the Hindu deity Harihara. They responded that "We feel there is a huge public benefit to visitors in displaying the whole world under one roof. The strength of the museum's collection is its breadth and depth, which allows visitors to compare and contrast cultures and understand our interconnectivity. [...] This is because we share, in a wider geographical and temporal context, the history and culture of South Asia not only with our international visitors, but also the UK's South Asian Diaspora."

He is mentioned in William Dalrymple's book White Mughals (2002).

== Published works ==
- Stuart, Charles (1798). Observations and remarks on the dress, discipline, etc. of the military. By a Bengal Officer. Calcutta.
- Stuart, Charles (1808). Vindication of the Hindoos from the aspersions of the Reverend Claudius Buchanan, M.A.: with a refutation of the arguments exhibited in his memoir, on the expediency of an ecclesiastical establishment for British India, and the ultimate civilization of the natives, by their conversion to Christianity: also, remarks on an address from the missionaries in Bengal to the natives of India, condemning their errors, and inviting them to become Christians : the whole tending to evince the excellence of the moral system of the Hindoos, and the danger of interfering with their customs or religion: by a Bengal officer. London: R. and J. Rodwell.
- Stuart, Charles (1808). A Vindication of the Hindoos: Part the Second, in Reply to the Observations of The Christian Observer, of Mr. Fuller, Secretary to the Baptist Missionary Society, and of His Anonymous Friend: with Some Remarks on a Sermon Preached at Oxford by the Rev. Dr. Barrow, on the Expediency of Introducing Christianity Among the Natives of India. London: sold.
- Stuart, Charles (1809). The Ladies' Monitor: Being a Series of Letters, First Published in Bengal, on the Subject of Female Apparel, Tending to Favour a Regulated Adoption of Indian Costume, and a Rejection of Superfluous Vesture, by the Ladies of this Country ... London.
