= Leigh-on-Sea =

Town in Essex, England

Coordinates: 51.5425°N 0.6535°E

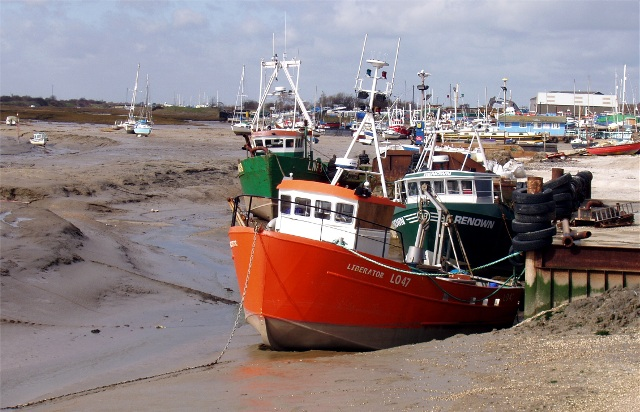
- The Old Leigh waterfront at low tide, with cockle boats

- Location within Essex
- Interactive map of Leigh-on-Sea
- Population: 22,568 (Parish, 2021)
- OS grid reference: TQ841859
- Civil parish: Leigh-on-Sea
- Unitary authority: Southend-on-Sea
- Ceremonial county: Essex
- Region: East
- Country: England
- Sovereign state: United Kingdom
- Post town: LEIGH-ON-SEA
- Postcode district: SS9
- Dialling code: 01702
- Police: Essex
- Fire: Essex
- Ambulance: East of England
- UK Parliament: Southend West and Leigh

Leigh-on-Sea ( /ˌliː-/), commonly referred to simply as Leigh, is a town and civil parish within the city of Southend-on-Sea, located in the ceremonial county of Essex, England. At the 2021 census the parish had a population of 22,568.

== Geography ==
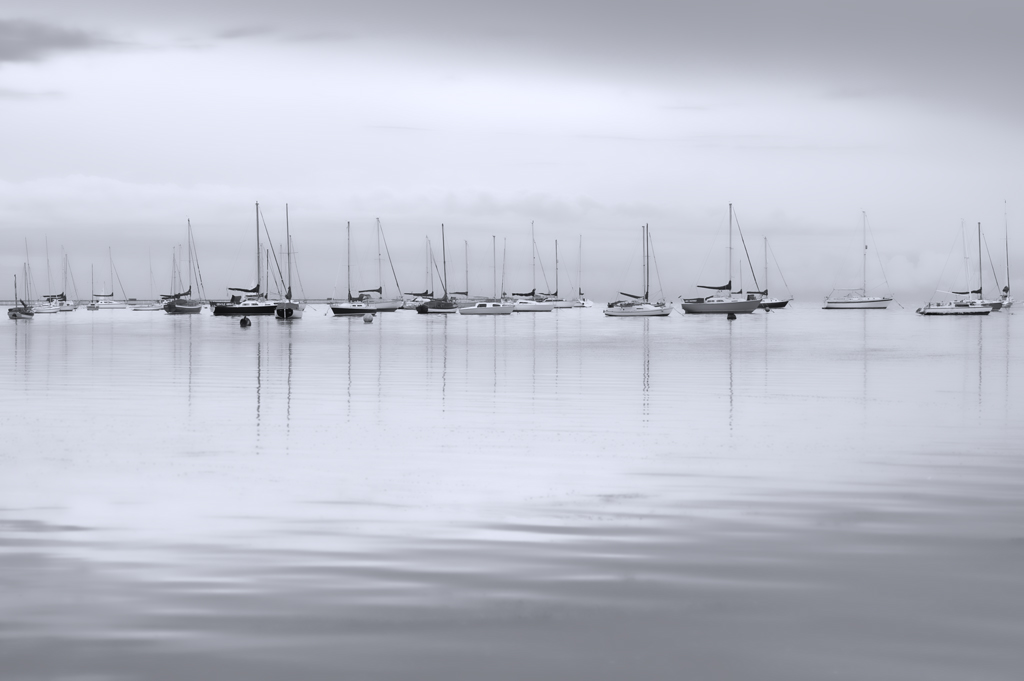
A calm Old Leigh morning

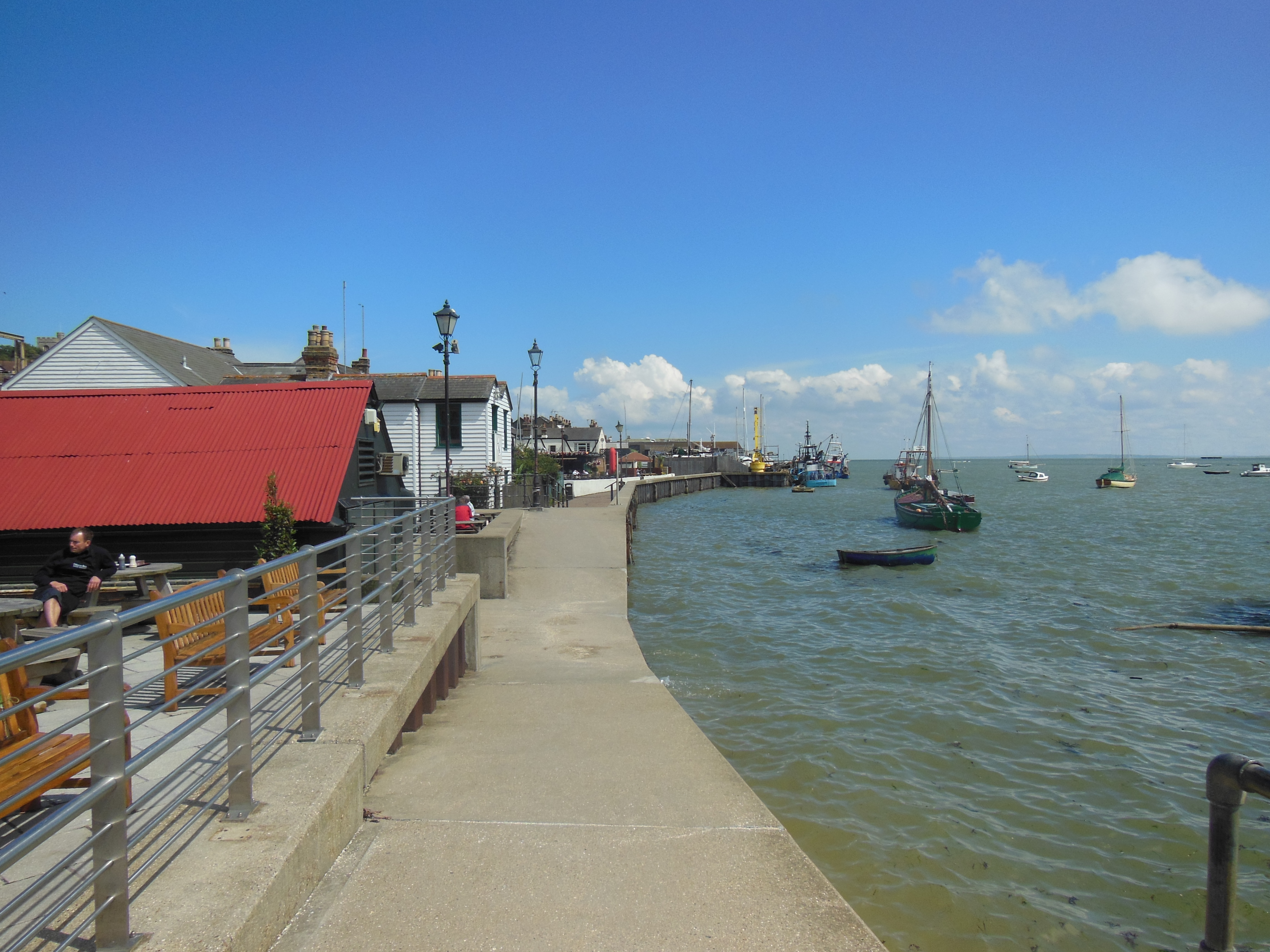
The Old Leigh waterfront at high tide. The green boat, Endeavour was one of six cockle boats that was acquired to be one of the "little ships" in the Dunkirk evacuation.

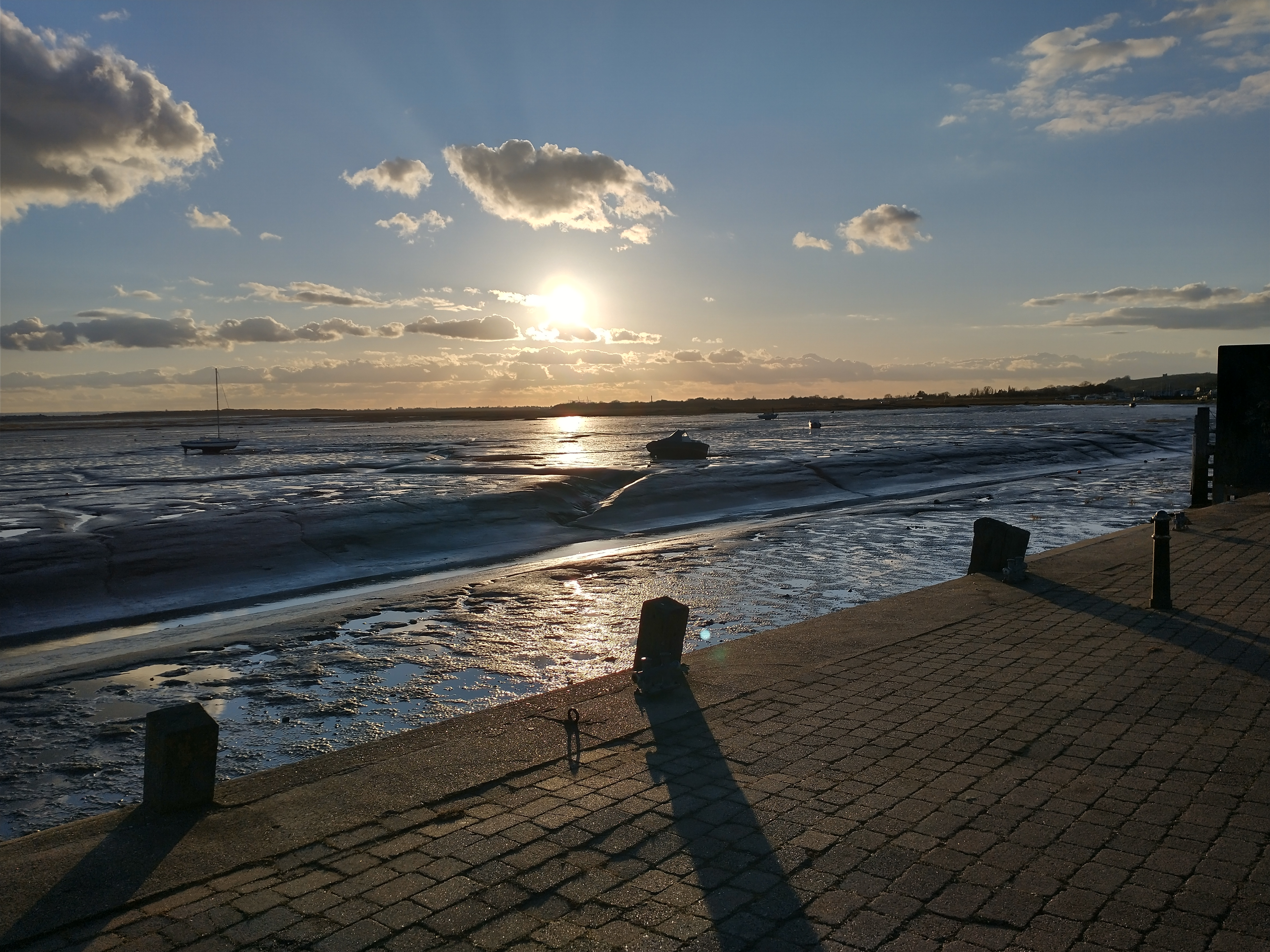
View across the Thames Estuary at low tide near sunset

Leigh-on-Sea is on the northern side of the Thames Estuary, a few miles from the open waters of the North Sea to the east, and a similar distance from the Kent coast to the south. The coastal environs of the town feature a nature reserve at Two Tree Island and a centrally located beach adjacent to Bell Wharf. At low tide Leigh's foreshore has a wide expanse of mud flats and creeks, extending offshore towards the deep water channel of the Thames (Yantlet Channel). Leigh is 40 miles (65 kilometres) from central London via road and rail networks and is part of the London commuter belt.

== History ==
=== Origins ===
Archaeological finds of pottery and coins from Romano-British era in the locality suggest early settlement. From at least the Saxon period a hilltop clearing amidst the woodland that covered much of the surrounding area (the Rochford Hundred) of Essex came to be known as Leigh (Lee in Anglo-Saxon).

A place of minor economic importance at the time of the Norman Conquest, a reference to Leigh (Legra) appears in the Domesday Book survey of 1086 where it lists a population of 9, in the ownership of Ranulf Peverel in the Rochford Hundred.

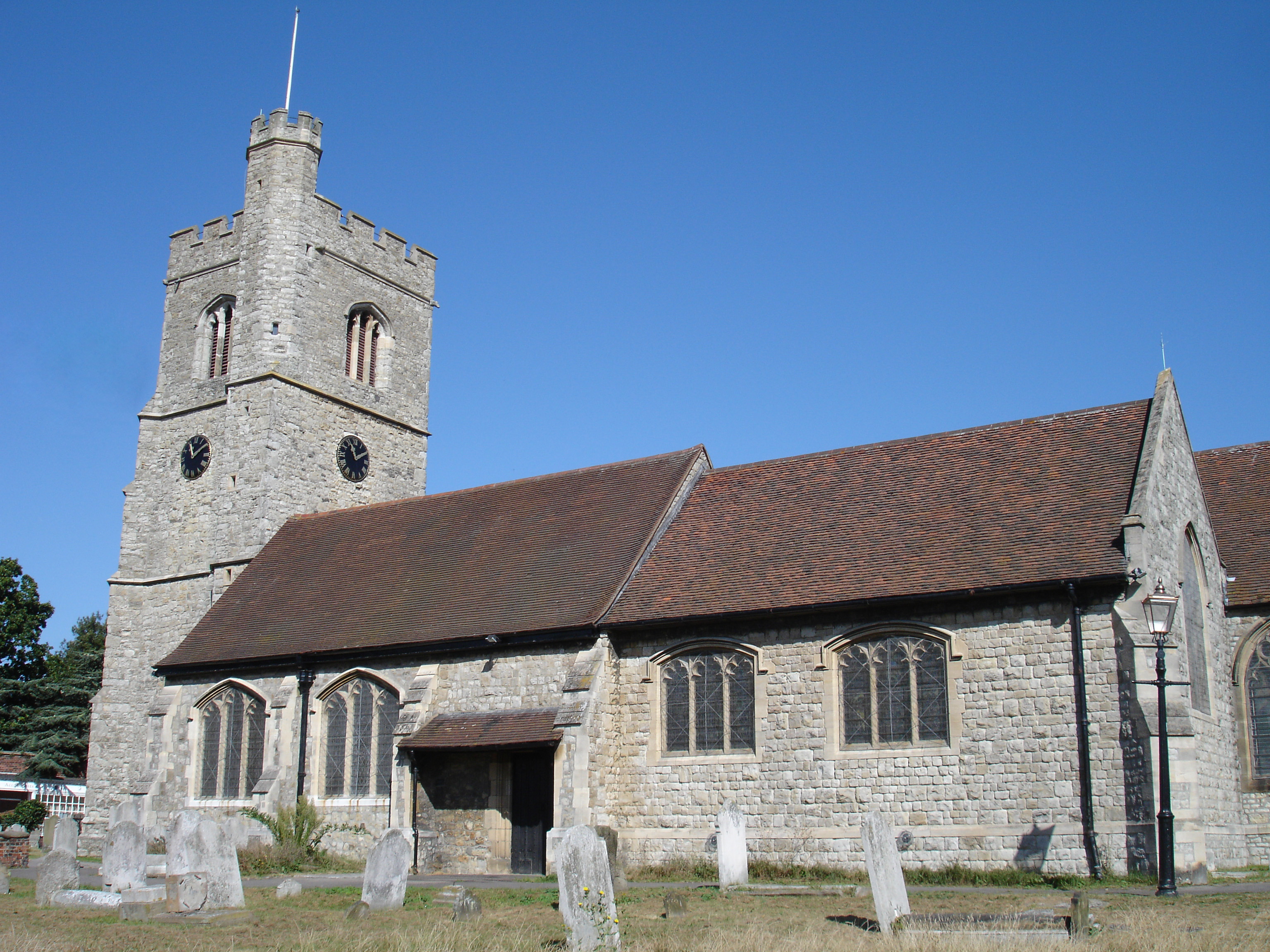
St Clement's Church, Leigh-on-Sea

St Clement's Church was rebuilt in the late 15th century or early 16th century, although the list of rectors dates back 1248. The fabric of the church is of Kentish ragstone and flint rubble, with a Tudor porch constructed of red brick. The mediaeval structure of the church was added to and altered during the 19th and early 20th centuries. The chancel was extended at the east end in 1872 by C. F. Haywood; Ernest Geldart added the south aisle in 1897, and there were a number of alterations made by Sir Charles Nicholson in 1913 and 1919. The tower at the west end was a prominent landmark for shipping on the Thames Estuary, and the building contains a good selection of stained glass dating from between the 18th and 20th centuries. The building is Grade II* listed by Historic England, and a key factor for this rating was the sympathetic nature of the 19th and 20th century additions.

Leigh Hall, a medieval manor house for the parish that was demolished in 1907, was once situated near the ancient eastern manorial boundary of Leigh and Prittlewell.

Robert Eden, who became rector of Leigh in 1837, demolished the previous rectory and commissioned a large new one, which was completed in 1838. One quarter of the building remains today as Leigh Library, as the other wings of the building were demolished by Southend Corporation when they acquired the building and the surrounding land. The rectory and grounds occupied a 6-acre (2.5-hectare) site, and the work carried out by Eden included the construction of Rectory Grove as a public right of way, which replaced an existing cliff-top path called Chess Lane. Leigh Library was designated as a listed building at Grade II in 1974.

=== 'Old Leigh' ===
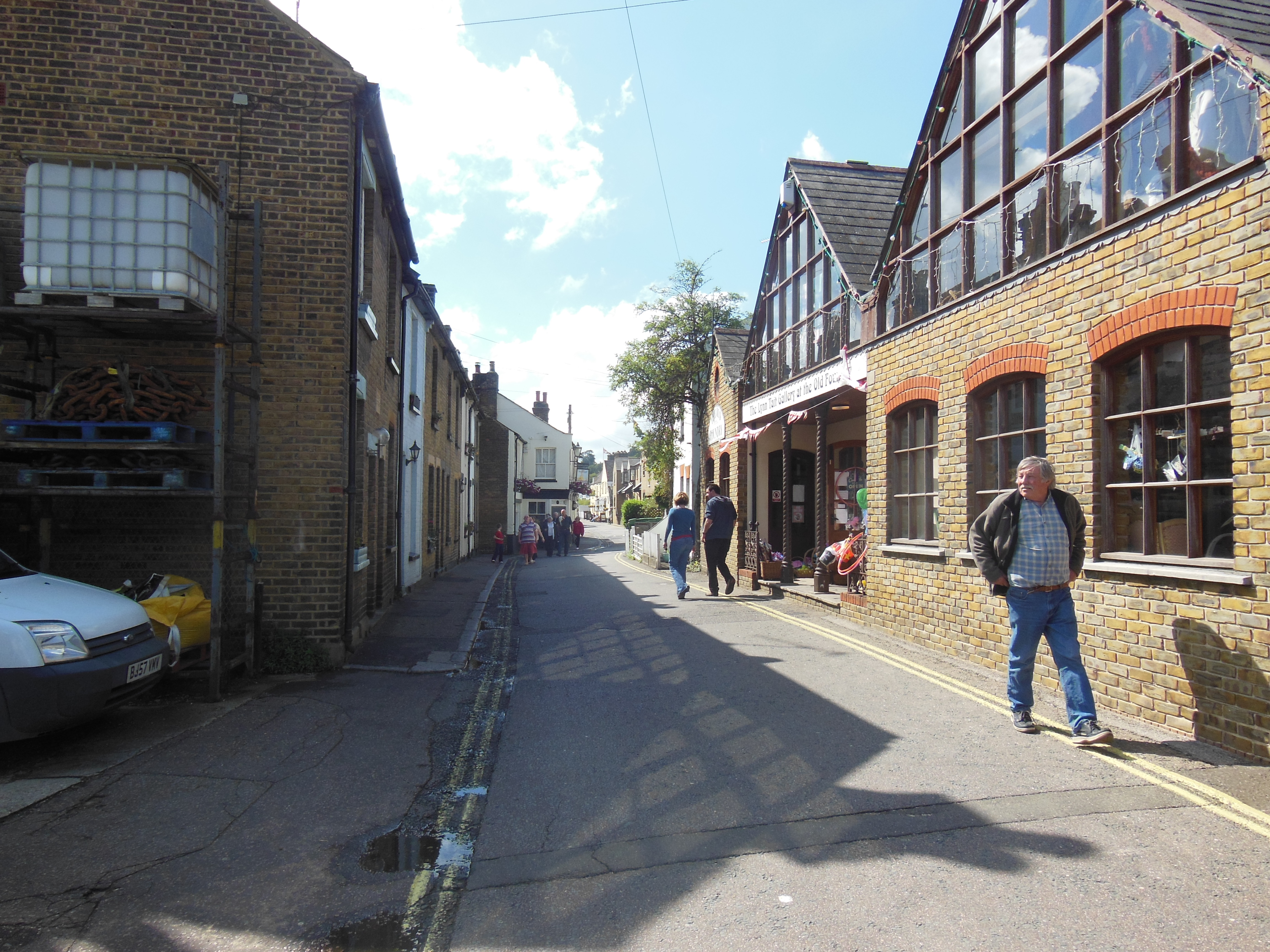
The High Street in Old Leigh

In the 11th century Leigh was a marginal community of homesteads. The Domesday Book of 1086 records 'five smallholders above the water who do not hold land', who were probably engaged in fishing thus giving Leigh a claim to nearly a thousand years of activity in the fishing industry.

The main seafood catch from Leigh fishing boats has always been shellfish and whitebait. Many of the local trawlers were at one time bawleys, and two of Old Leigh's pubs – the Peter Boat and Ye Olde Smack – owe their names to types of local fishing boat.

The riverside settlement of 'Old Leigh', or 'The Old Town', is historically significant; it was once on the primary shipping route to London. From the Middle Ages until the turn of the 20th century, Old Leigh hosted the settlement's market square, and high street (known as Leigh Strand). Elizabethan historian William Camden (1551–1623) described Leigh as "a proper fine little towne and verie full of stout and adventurous sailers". By the 1740s however, Leigh's deep water access had become silted up (as attested to by John Wesley) and the village was in decline as an anchorage and port of call.

=== Modern era ===
Broadway developed between the 1870s and the 1920s from a residential street to a commercial parade of shopfronts, as the town began to expand. During the 1920s, Broadway was extended further west with the demolition of a large manor house, Black House/Leigh House (built 1620).

In 1983 Leigh gained its own paper, Leigh Times, and in 1996 gained its own Town Council.

During the 1990s and the early 21st century Leigh-on-Sea went through more change: the growing dominance of out-of-town, 24-hour supermarkets and retail parks, as well as the arrival and popularity of retail online shopping, meant that much local business had to reinvent itself, either as venues for socialising, or to offer niche services and products to cater for the town's changing demographic.

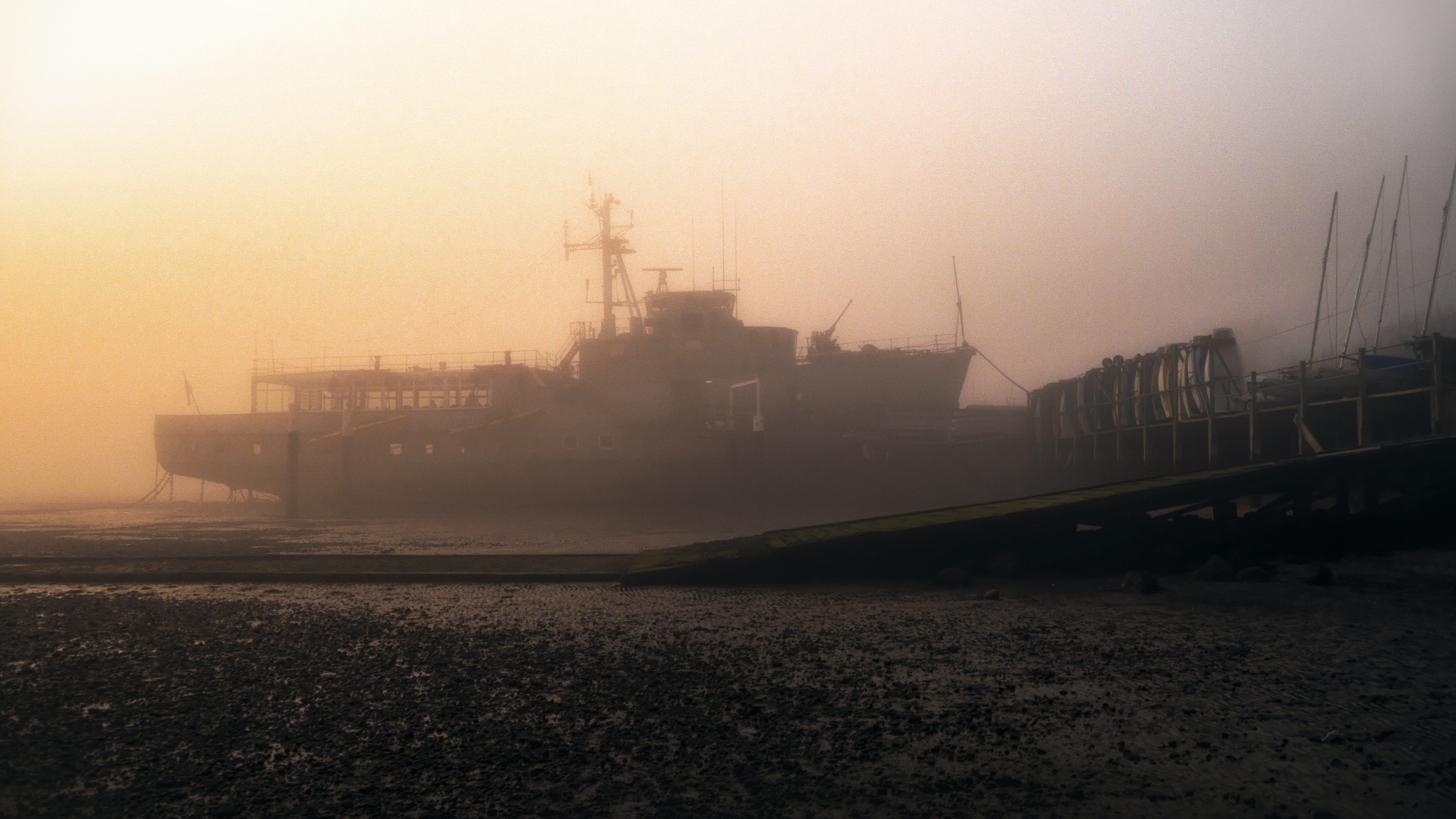
A foggy winter morning in Leigh-On-Sea

Leigh-on-Sea has frequently been cited as one of the best places to live in the UK, owing to factors such as its proximity to London, nearby outstanding Westcliff and Southend grammar schools, good access to sports and arts activities, multiple opportunities to develop skills, and a strong sense of belonging and community spirit. A 2018 survey by Rightmove found that Leigh-on-Sea was the place in the UK where people were happiest living.

On 15 October 2021, Sir David Amess, the local Member of Parliament, was murdered at a constituency surgery being held in Belfairs Methodist Church in the town. Southend was granted city status as a memorial to Amess in 2022.

== Transport ==
Leigh-on-Sea is served by Leigh-on-Sea railway station on the London, Tilbury and Southend line. The railway station is situated near the western end of Old Leigh marina. Built in 1934, it replaced the original 1855 station, which still exist and are currently used by Leigh Sailing Club. Regular, daily bus services run between Southend-on-Sea, Benfleet, Canvey Island, Basildon, Rayleigh and Chelmsford. Scheduled flights to national and European destinations operate out of nearby London Southend Airport.

== Governance ==
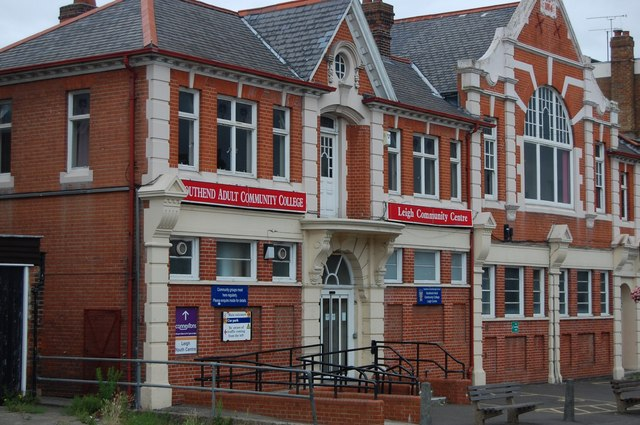
Leigh Community Centre on Elm Road, completed in 1912 as a fire station and offices for the old Leigh-on-Sea Urban District Council

There are two tiers of local government covering Leigh-on-Sea, at parish (town) and unitary authority level: Leigh-on-Sea Town Council and Southend-on-Sea City Council. The town council is based at the Leigh Community Centre at 71–73 Elm Road.

For national elections, Leigh forms part of the Southend West and Leigh constituency, represented by David Burton-Sampson of the Labour Party.

=== Administrative history ===
Leigh was an ancient parish in the Rochford Hundred of Essex. When elected parish and district councils were established in 1894, Leigh was given a parish council and included in the Rochford Rural District.

In 1897, the parish of Leigh was removed from the rural district and converted into its own urban district. Whereas the parish was just called Leigh, the urban district created in 1897 was officially called Leigh-on-Sea. The urban district council built itself a combined headquarters and fire station on Elm Road, which was completed in 1912. Leigh-on-Sea Urban District was abolished in 1913 and its area absorbed into the borough of Southend-on-Sea.

Leigh has been administered as part of Southend-on-Sea since 1913. In 1995 a new civil parish of Leigh-on-Sea was created to provide an additional tier of local government for the area. The new parish council adopted the name Leigh-on-Sea Town Council.

== Festivals and activities ==
Several annual events have become well established, including Leigh Regatta, Leigh Folk Festival and The Leigh Art Trail. The regatta is held over one weekend in September.

== Museums and galleries ==
Leigh Heritage Centre is located in the Old Smithy and serves as a museum for Old Leigh. It is run by the Leigh Society, who have also opened the next-door Plumbs Cottage, a restored and substantially rebuilt 1850s fisherman's cottage.

Old Leigh Art Studios is a commercial gallery with artists studios. It was established by the artist Sheila Appleton and potter Richard Baxter in 1991. They have since been joined by painter Ian Smith and ceramicist Julie O’Sullivan. The studios participate in the annual Leigh Art Trail.

== Notable people ==
- John Barber (1919–2004), former Finance Director of Ford of Europe & managing director of British Leyland.
- Lee Brilleaux, musician
- Phil Cornwell, actor, comedian and impressionist
- Stephen Cottrell, Archbishop of York since 2020, born in Leigh-on-Sea
- Tina Cousins, singer
- Robert Daws, actor
- Robert Eden, rector of Leigh-on-Sea
- John Fowles, author
- Phill Jupitus, comedian, who moved to Leigh in 2000
- Robert King, footballer and rector of Leigh-on-Sea from 1892 to 1950
- David Lloyd, tennis player and businessman
- Martyn Lucking, Olympic shot putter and anti-drug campaigner
- John Lloyd, tennis player
- Marie Macarte, equestrian performer
- Helen Mirren, actress, born in Hammersmith and brought up in Leigh-on-Sea
- Peggy Mount, actress, born in Leigh-on-Sea on 2 May 1915.
- Julian Parkhill, geneticist, working with pathogens
- Vivian Stanshall, artist and musician
- Alister Watson, mathematician and alleged member of the Cambridge spy ring
- Rebecca West, author, lived at Marine Parade between 1917 and 1919.
- Michael Wilding, actor.
- Peter Sallis, actor, briefly lived as a resident, before and during World War II
- Jack Chesher, historian and author of London: A Guide for Curious Wanderers.
