= Claude Wilson =

English footballer and cricketer

Claude William Wilson (12 May 1858 – 29 June 1881) was an English amateur footballer who played in the 1880 FA Cup Final for Oxford University and made two appearances for England.

== Career ==
=== Education ===
Wilson was born in Banbury, Oxfordshire, and educated at Brighton College, where he played for the college football team in 1876 and 1877, being captain in the latter year. He then went up to Exeter College, Oxford, where he won blues for football in 1879, 1880 and 1881.

=== Football career ===
Wilson was called into the England team for their first-ever meeting with Wales. The match was played at the Kennington Oval on 18 January 1879 in a blizzard. Due to the atrocious snowfall both captains agreed to play halves of only 30 minutes each. The poor attendance (reports range from 85 to 300) was also attributed to the weather. Some sources suggest that William Clegg turned up 20 minutes late for the game. Clegg, a solicitor, was working late on a case (the trial of Charles Peace, the Banner Cross murderer) and was unable to leave Sheffield for London on the Friday night. The next morning, the southbound train with Clegg on it, was delayed by heavy snow. The match started without Clegg and England played with ten men until he arrived. Despite this, England won the match by two goals to one, with Herbert Whitfeld and Thomas Sorby scoring for England.

In 1880, he was part of the Oxford University team that reached the FA Cup Final, where they met the previous year's losing finalists, Clapham Rovers. This was the university's fourth appearance in the Cup Final since the Cup was inaugurated in 1872, and, having "conquered much-fancied Nottingham Forest in the semi-final" were favourites to take the trophy. In the event, the Rovers defence were able to keep the university forwards at bay, and with Wilson and his fellow full-back Robert King tiring towards the end of the second half, and the prospect of extra time imminent, Francis Sparks "made a clever run down the wing, crossed to the waiting Clopton Lloyd-Jones who had the simple task of slotting the ball between the Oxford goalposts to secure a one-goal lead." This was the last appearance in an FA Cup Final for both teams.

His second England call-up came for the match against Scotland on 12 March 1881, in which England went down to a "humiliating" 6–1 defeat, with Scotland's goals including a hat-trick from John Smith and two from George Ker.

Wilson also played for the Old Brightonians and represented Sussex. He was described by Charles Alcock in his 1882 "Football Annual" as "a splendid back; strong kick; very fast and active; his unexpected demise, in June, was deeply regretted by all who knew him".

=== Cricket career ===
Wilson also played cricket at first-class level. He played in one match for the University against the Gentlemen of England in June 1881, when he scored 51 in the university's second innings in a drawn match.

Immediately after this match, he played for Surrey against Gloucestershire. In this match, in which he was the wicketkeeper, he was dismissed lbw to W. G. Grace, who led his team to a victory by 8 wickets.

== Death ==
In June 1881, he caught sunstroke during a cricket match and subsequently died at Betchworth, Surrey, on 29 June.

== Honours ==
Oxford University

- FA Cup runners-up: 1880

== See also ==
- List of fatal accidents in cricket
