= Percival Parr =

English footballer

Personal information
- Full name: Percival Chase Parr
- Date of birth: 2 December 1859
- Place of birth: Bickley, Bromley, Kent
- Date of death: 3 September 1912
- Place of death: Widmore, Bromley, Kent
- Position: Goalkeeper

Senior career*
Years	Team	Apps	(Gls)
- Oxford University

International career
1882	England	1	(0)
- * Club domestic league appearances and goals

Percival Chase Parr (2 December 1859 – 3 September 1912) was an English barrister and footballer who earned one cap for the national team in 1882. Parr played club football usually as goalkeeper but later as centre-forward for Oxford University, taking part in the 1880 FA Cup Final.

== Early life ==
Parr was born at Bickley, near Bromley in Kent, the fourth son of General Thomas Chase Parr. He was educated at Winchester College and New College, Oxford, graduating as B.A. in 1883.

== Football career ==
Parr had played in the Winchester football XI in 1877, and was an Oxford football Blue in each year of 1880 to 1882, captaining his team in the latter year. C.W. Alcock described him as "a splendid goalkeeper, very cool and full of pluck" though he also appeared for England as centre-forward in his one international game, against Wales at Wrexham in 1882, scoring a goal. He kept goal in his first two Varsity matches, but captained his team as centre in the third.

At the FA Cup Final for Oxford against Clapham Rovers on 10 April 1880 at Kennington Oval, he kept goal successfully until, just six minutes before call of time, Clopton Lloyd-Jones scored the match's only goal, let in through a weak mis-kick from Oxford teammate Charles King, for Rovers.

Parr also played for Swifts, where as centre he scored the hat-trick of goals against Upton Park in a second round FA Cup tie replay in 1882, as well as old boy club Old Wykehamists. He also played in representative matches for West Kent and Kent county.

He was a member of the Football Association committee in 1881.

== Cricket career ==
Percival Parr
Cricket information
- Batting: Right-handed
- Bowling: Right-arm fast
- Role: Bowler

Domestic team information
- Years: Team
- 1880: Gentlemen of Kent
- Only FC: 5 August 1880 Gentlemen of Kent v Gentlemen of England
- Source: CricketArchive, 9 April 2025

Parr was also a cricketer, playing in the Winchester College XI in 1877 and 1878 and made one first-class cricket appearance for the Gentlemen of Kent in 1880. He played cricket whilst at Oxford, although he did not play for the university team, and for a range of club teams, including I Zingari. Primarily a bowler, in his only first-class match, a Canterbury Cricket Week fixture against a Gentlemen of England team, he took a single wicket.

== Career outside sport ==
Parr was a barrister, called to the bar at the Inner Temple in 1885, who later branched out into publishing. He was partner in the publishing firm of W.H. Allen & Company, and editor of magazines National Observer from 1894 and Ladies' Field. He died at his last home, Molescroft, at Widmore, Bromley, in 1912 aged 52.
