= Bertram Rogers =

English footballer (1860–1953)

Personal information
- Full name: Bertram Mitford Heron Rogers
- Date of birth: 25 August 1860
- Place of birth: Oxford
- Date of death: 10 February 1953 (aged 92)
- Place of death: Oxford
- Position: Half-back

Senior career*
| Years | Team | Apps | (Gls) |
| 1880 | North Oxford | | |
| 1880–81 | Oxford University | | |
- * Club domestic league appearances and goals

Bertram Mitford Heron Rogers (25 August 1860 – 10 February 1953) was an English footballer who played in the 1880 FA Cup Final.

== Early life ==
Rogers was the second son of Thorold Rogers and was born at 4 Wellington Place in Oxford. He attended the School of Art in Oxford and Magdalen College School in Oxford, before going up to Westminster School. He represented Westminster at cricket, averaging 10 with the bat over 15 innings in 1877.

In 1876, Rogers discovered the body of his older brother, Henry, who had hanged himself, at the family home in Oxford, and gave extensive evidence at the inquest.

Rogers went up to Exeter College, Oxford in January 1880, and took his Bachelor of Arts in 1883.

== Football career ==
His first known football match was for the North Oxford club against Newbury in February 1880, as a forward; although Westminster was known as a footballing nursery, he never represented the school.

However Rogers was a late bloomer, as his appearance for North Oxford led to him being chosen the following month for the Oxford University side as a half-back in the 1879–80 FA Cup quarter-final tie with the Royal Engineers; by coincidence, the captain at the start of the season had been another Rogers (Percy John Mackarness), but he was no relation. Rogers' first three competitive matches came inside a week - the original tie with the Sappers, the replay after the original match was drawn, and, in between, the Varsity match against Cambridge. He played as half-back in all three matches, which were all played at the Kennington Oval. Oxford beat the Sappers in the replay, but lost the Varsity.

Rogers kept his place in the win over Nottingham Forest in the semi-final, and, in the final against Clapham Rovers, "greatly distinguished" himself, but the Rovers clinched the game with a late goal.

Rogers only appears in two more matches, a 4–0 win over Maidenhead in October 1880, and again on the losing side in the Varsity in February 1881.

== Personal life ==
Rogers became a doctor of medicine, living in Clifton, Bristol, and on 2 October 1891 married Agnes Fletcher at Carfax. The couple had two daughters.

He was a member of the Royal College of Surgeons and a licenciate of the Royal College of Physicians, and joined the Royal Army Medical Corps, being appointed Lieutenant in 1908. By 1921 he was a lieutenant-colonel and was made an Officer of the Order of the Hospital of St John of Jerusalem in October 1927.

He was an author of a number of medical papers, and edited a handbook to Bristol for the British Association in 1898, contributing a chapter on meteorology.

He returned to Oxford in retirement, where he died on 10 February 1953, with his daughters being granted probate; his estate was worth over £27,800.
