= Francis Phillips (footballer) =

English footballer

Personal information
- Full name: Francis Angelo Theodore Phillips
- Date of birth: 3 August 1857
- Place of birth: Notting Hill, England
- Date of death: 15 February 1936 (aged 78)
- Place of death: Eastbourne, England
- Position: Half-back

Senior career*
Years	Team	Apps	(Gls)
1880	Oxford University		
- * Club domestic league appearances and goals

Francis Angelo Theodore Phillips (3 August 1857 – 15 February 1936) was an English footballer who played in the 1880 FA Cup Final.

== Early life ==
Phillips was born in Notting Hill, London, in 1857, the son of Major-General George Phillips and Sophia, née Haultain.

He was educated at Winchester College, an early adopter of association football, starting on a scholarship in 1869, and received a silver medal for academic performance in 1876. He passed the entrance exam for the University of Oxford in 1875, being accepted by Balliol College, but he did not matriculate until 1878, when he was 21. He did not graduate, but passed the Indian Civil Service examinations in the same year, and was transferred before taking his final University exams.

== Football career ==
Phillips played for the Winchester first six under the school's own code in 1873, and made his competitive debut in association football as one of the two half-backs for the Oxford University side which beat Birmingham Cricket & Football Club in the second round in the 1879–80 FA Cup. His next three appearances came in a single week in March; two quarter-final ties against the Royal Engineers and, in between, the Varsity match against Cambridge - the Dark Blues won the Cup replay, the Light Blues the Varsity.

Phillips' crossing was a feature of Oxford's surprise win over Nottingham Forest in the semi-final, and, in the final against Clapham Rovers, he came "within an ace" of opening the scoring from a free-kick, but the Rovers clinched the game with a late goal.

== Post-football career ==
The Cup final was his last match of any note as his Civil Service role required him to go to India, arriving there in November 1880. He served as the assistant commissioner, and personal assistant to the Chief Commissioner, in Central Provinces. He rose to Commissioner rank, and served briefly as Chief Commissioner in March 1907. He retired to Eastbourne in 1908.

== Personal life ==
Phillips married Catherine Robbins in Eastbourne on 27 December 1890. The couple had two children; a son, Harold, who died in infancy, and a daughter, Violet, both children being born in India.

Phillips died in 1936 at the Hyde Gardens nursing home in Eastbourne.
