= John Eyre (cricketer, born 1859) =

English cricketer and solicitor

Personal information
- Full name: John Eyre
- Born: 29 October 1859; Shaw, Berkshire, England
- Died: 24 November 1941 (aged 82); Bayswater, London, England
- Batting: Unknown

Domestic team information
- Years: Team
- 1887: Marylebone Cricket Club

Career statistics
Competition	First-class
Matches	1
Runs scored	9
Batting average	9.00
100s/50s	–/–
Top score	9
Catches/stumpings	–/–
- Source: Cricinfo, 15 August 2021

John Eyre OBE (29 October 1859 — 24 November 1941) was an English first-class cricketer and footballer.

The son of Richard Eyre, he was born at Shaw House in Berkshire in October 1859. He was educated at Winchester College, before going up to Keble College, Oxford. He later changed college, transferring to Christ Church.

== First-class cricket ==
Eyre later made a single appearance in first-class cricket for the Marylebone Cricket Club (MCC), captained by W. G. Grace, against Cambridge University at Lord's in 1887. Batting once in the match, he was dismissed for 9 runs by Francis Ford in the MCC first innings, with the MCC winning the match by 10 wickets.

== Football ==
Eyre also played football for Winchester School and Oxford University. For the latter he was a Blue in 1879 and 1880, and appeared as centre-forward in their losing team at the 1880 FA Cup Final when they lost to Clapham Rovers. He played representative county football for Berkshire.

== Career outside sport ==
By profession Eyre was a land agent. He also served as a justice of peace and member of Buckinghamshire County Council and sat on several hospital boards, his civic services earning him honour as Officer of the Order of the British Empire.

== Personal life ==
He married Lady Evelyn Alice Curzon in April 1896, the daughter of Richard Curzon-Howe, 3rd Earl Howe. For some years after the First World War the couple lived in Switzerland. Eyre died at his Cleveland Square home in Bayswater in November 1941.
