= Aaqil Rizan =

Sri Lankan footballer

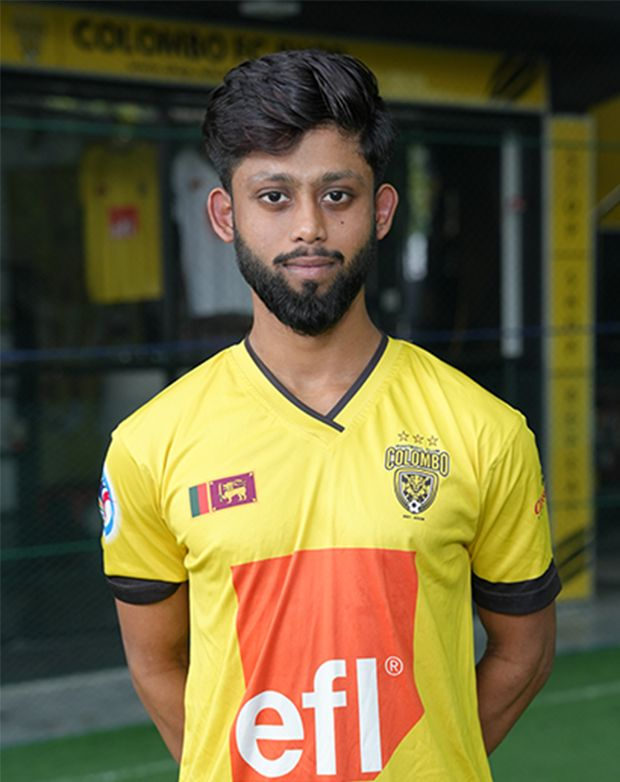
- Aaqil playing for Colombo FC

Personal information
- Full name: Mohamed Rizan Mohamed Aaqil
- Date of birth: 5 February 2003 (age 23)
- Place of birth: Colombo, Sri Lanka
- Height: 1.78 m (5 ft 10 in)
- Position: Forward

Team information
- Current team: Negeri Sembilan FC
- Number: 30

Youth career
- 2018–2020: Dubai City FC

Senior career*
Years	Team	Apps	(Gls)
2021–2023	Java Lane SC	1	(1)
2023–2025	Colombo FC	1	(3)
2025–2026	Negeri Sembilan FC		

International career
2025–	Sri Lanka		
- * Club domestic league appearances and goals

Aaqil Rizan (born 5 February 2003) is a Sri Lankan professional footballer who plays as a forward for Malaysian club Negeri Sembilan FC.

== Personal life ==
Outside football, Aaqil is involved in the family business LCY. In February 2021, he was involved in an LCY initiative that provided health-support packages to former Sri Lankan football players.

Aaqil Rizan is also in the fashion and apparel industry. He is one of the owners of Legacy LDN, a clothing brand based in the UK. In May 2025.

In 2026, Aaqil had declined commercial endorsement and image-rights licensing opportunities from betting companies because of his faith. He said that he did not want his name, likeness, or image used to promote gambling activities.

=== Family background ===
Aaqil Rizan is the son of Mohamed Rizan Jeffrey, a Sri Lankan businessman involved in economic policy advocacy and the domestic apparel industry. Jeffrey serves as the Policy and Reforms Chairman of the Ceylon United Business Alliance (CUBA).

Through his involvement with CUBA, Jeffrey has participated in public discussions concerning economic reforms, government taxation policies, import competition and the challenges faced by domestic manufacturers. His advocacy has focused particularly enterprise (SMEs), including businesses operating within Sri Lanka's apparel and manufacturing sectors.

In November 2026, Jeffrey publicly raised concerns regarding the potential effects of the 2027 national budget on SMEs, including taxation, electricity costs and the absence of targeted government incentives. He has also advocated for measures to support domestic apparel manufacturers and address competition from imported clothing.

== Club career ==
Aaqil began his career with Dubai City FC Youth in 2018. He returned to Sri Lanka and went on to represent Java Lane SC during the 2021–2023 season During his two seasons with the club, he competed in the Sri Lanka Champions League and the City League Cup, establishing himself as one of the team’s attacking options before transferring to Colombo FC. where he wore the number 27 shirt. During his time at Colombo FC, he scored a hat-trick in a 3–1 victory over Defenders FC in the Sri Lanka Super League, with goals in the 9th, 46th and 80th minutes..He later moved to Malaysian club Negeri Sembilan FC. He made his debut for Negeri Sembilan FC against Sabah FC, becoming the first Sri Lankan footballer to represent the club.

== Honours ==
Aaqil was featured among the most notable football players born in Colombo on Landsholdskortet. He appeared alongside several other footballers associated with the Colombo city, including Jack Butler, Kasun Jayasuriya, Charles Eastlake Smith and Mohamed Aakib. The listing included Aaqil among top nine documented footballers born in Colombo.
