= Arthur Savage =

Arthur Savage may refer to:

- A. H. Savage (Arthur Henry Patrick Savage, 1850–1905), 19th century footballer
- Arthur Craig Savage (1870–1931), American politician in Iowa
- Arthur William Savage (1857–1938), late 19th century gun designer, and inventor of radial tires
