= Francis Crowdy =

English footballer

Personal information
- Full name: Francis Demainbray Crowdy
- Date of birth: 17 September 1857
- Place of birth: Donnington, Berkshire
- Date of death: 12 February 1939 (aged 81)
- Place of death: Exeter, Devon
- Position: Forward

Youth career
- 1873–77: Westminster School

Senior career*
| Years | Team | Apps | (Gls) |
| 1877–80 | Oxford University | | |
| 1881–84 | Old Westminsters | | |
- * Club domestic league appearances and goals

Francis Demainbray Crowdy (17 September 1857 - 12 February 1939) was an English medical doctor and footballer who played in the 1880 FA Cup final for Oxford University.

== Early life ==
Crowdy was the son of Alfred, a solicitor from Berkshire. The family moved to Torquay in the mid-1860s.

He was educated at Westminster School, an early adopter of association football laws, and appeared in the school's Christmas play (Andria by the Roman comedian Terence) in 1875. He had an aptitude for athletics, winning the school's high jump contest in 1874 with a clearance of 5', and second in the pole vault with a height of 8'1".

He went up to Oriel College, Oxford in 1877, reading Mechanics and Physics & Chemistry, and took a "sportsman's" third. He became a doctor of medicine in 1885.

== Football career ==
Crowdy first played football for his school in 1873, and one particular highlight was his scoring one of the school's goals in a 2–2 draw with the Wanderers in 1875.

He first played for Oxford University as a forward in the 1877 Varsity Match, which Oxford won 1–0. His first FA Cup match came in the fourth round second replay match with the Royal Engineers in the 1877–78 competition; he scored one of the university's two goals, taking advantage of the ball spilling out of a scrimmage, but the Sappers won 4–2.

He did not feature at all in the 1878–79 FA Cup, but was a regular in the 1879–80 FA Cup; it was his shot, in the semi-final against Nottingham Forest, which was parried into the path of George Childs for Childs to score the only goal of the game. He "greatly distinguish[ed]" himself in the final against Clapham Rovers, but Oxford went down 1–0.

After leaving university he continued to play football, usually on the left-wing or in the centre of the forward line, for the Old Westminsters. His last match of any note was in the 3–2 defeat to the Old Carthusians in the 1882–83 FA Cup third round, in which he had the role of captain.

== Medical career ==
Dr Crowdy was a member of the British Medical Association for 37 years; he originally practised at St Thomas' Hospital in London, and spent 30 years in practice in Torquay, never mentioning his association football career to his colleagues, and instead enjoying cricket as a recreation.

== Personal life ==
He married Florence Saunders on 8 April 1896 at St Mary's Church in Marylebone. The couple had two sons and two daughters. Dr Crowdy died in Exeter on 12 February 1939, survived by his widow and three of his children.
