= Felix Barry =

English footballer

Personal information
- Full name: Felix Barry
- Date of birth: October 1858
- Place of birth: Leytonstone, Essex, England
- Date of death: 23 December 1933 (aged 75)
- Place of death: St Andrews, Scotland
- Position: Forward

Senior career*
Years	Team	Apps	(Gls)
1872–1874	Forest School		
1877–1879	Old Foresters		
1879–1881	Clapham Rovers		
- * Club domestic league appearances and goals

Felix Barry (October 1858 – 23 December 1933) was an English amateur footballer who played for Clapham Rovers in its 1880 FA Cup Final win.

== Career ==
He was baptised in Leytonstone on 29 September 1858, son of Charles Ainslie Barry and Edith Bird.

He attended the Forest School, Walthamstow, which was one of the great centres for learning association football, and played for the Forest School F.C. for the first time in the 1872–73 season; his first game for the school side against an "external" club was in a defeat against Woodford Wells in February 1873, when he was 14 years old.

He does not appear to have made any reported appearances between November 1874 and October 1877, when he scored twice for his "old boy" club - the Old Foresters - in a win over Maidenhead. He duly made his FA Cup debut in December 1877; his first tie was a defeat to Oxford University. He did however have the consolation of being chosen to play for the Football Association against the Sheffield Football Association the following week, as one of the two centre-forwards.

He continued with the Old Foresters in 1878–79, but for the 1879–80 season he started playing for Clapham Rovers. He played from the second round of the FA Cup onwards, scoring twice in the third round hammering of Pilgrims, and played in the final victory against Oxford University, although his impact against a sound University defence was limited.

He continued playing for the Rovers the following season, and was one of four players to score a hat-trick in the club's 15–0 first round victory over Finchley, the visitors handicapped by only having 9 players. He added a string to his bow by acting as referee for the tie between Weybridge Swallows and Upton Park.

He scored twice more for the Rovers in the thrilling 5–4 win over Upton Park in the fourth round, but did not play in the quarter-final defeat to the Old Carthusians, a re-jig of the forward line seeing winger Henry Wace moved to the centre to accommodate Charles Wollaston on the right, and he did not play another FA Cup tie afterwards.

His final match for Clapham Rovers seems to have been against his old school in November 1881, and he played for the Stock Exchange side against Lloyd's of London in their annual match in 1882, captained by his former Clapham Rovers team-mate Vincent Weston, with three other Rovers players on the pitch. However, with professionalism on the rise, he seems to have given up the game; one sign of the shift in the centre of gravity of the game was appearing in a Rovers side which lost 7–1 at the Kennington Oval in February 1881 to Blackburn Rovers.

He was known as a prodigious dribbler, but with a tendency to hold onto the ball for too long, going over "a great deal of unnecessary ground by dribbling from side to side". He was also successful in athletic sprints, his specialist distance being the 120 yards.

== Personal life ==
A stockjobber at the time of his first marriage (to Annie Maria Duke) in 1884, he had one daughter by his first marriage, Aletta Barry. After his first wife died, he married again in 1921 (to Margaret Amy Rae, at All Souls Church, Langham Place), and died on 23 December 1933, by which time he was living in St Andrews. He left a fortune of £5,903 15/5 to his wodow.

== Honours ==
Clapham Rovers

- FA Cup winner: 1880
