= Reginald Heygate (footballer) =

English footballer

The Rev. Reginald Heygate
Personal information
- Full name: Reginald Thomas Heygate
- Date of birth: 17 January 1858
- Place of birth: Leigh-on-Sea
- Date of death: 11 March 1947 (aged 89)
- Place of death: Cheltenham
- Position: Forward

Youth career
- 1876: Lancing College

Senior career*
| Years | Team | Apps | (Gls) |
| 1877–81 | Oxford University | | |
- * Club domestic league appearances and goals

Reginald Thomas Heygate (7 January 1858 - 1 March 1947) was an association footballer and Church of England vicar, who played in the 1880 FA Cup final.

== Early life ==
He was the fifth son of William and Maria Elizabeth Heygate; William was the assistant curate of Leigh-on-Sea.

He was educated at Lancing College, one of the first schools to teach association football, and was captain of the school side against former pupils in 1876. He went up to Keble College, Oxford in 1877, and graduated in 1881.

== Football career ==
He quickly made the Oxford University first XI, making his debut in the 1877–78 FA Cup first round win over Herts Rangers at the Parks. His first goal for the university came in a defeat to the Wanderers at the Kennington Oval in a friendly in December that year, and his first in competitive football came at the same venue in the third round win over Clapham Rovers. He was however injured for the semi-final against the Royal Engineers, which went to two replays before the Sappers won through.

He did not represent the university at all in 1878–79, although he did represent his college side, and was considered a substitute when included in the XI for the first round replay against Great Marlow in the 1879–80 FA Cup, which Oxford won 1–0. However he kept his place, scoring in the second round against the Birmingham Club, and creating the winning goal against Maidenhead in the third round thanks to his throw-in causing defensive chaos, a tie for which he was captain. He retained the captaincy for the remainder of the competition, including the final, in which Clapham Rovers got revenge for its defeat in 1877–78, beating Oxford with a late winner.

He captained the Oxford side in the Varsity match against Cambridge University in 1880 and 1881, but was on the losing side both times. He also came close to representing England, being one of the reserves for the 1881 international match against Scotland.

However, his final association match was for the university against the Old Westminsters in March 1881, as he did not keep his association football career going after graduation. Instead he turned to the rugby union code, playing as a forward for Leeds Parish Church from 1882 to 1884, and even played in a trial match to select players for the Yorkshire representative side in October 1883.

== Personal life ==
He became the curate of Leeds in 1882, and after holding ecclesiastical positions (including a spell in St John's, Newfoundland), was made vicar of Honley, near Huddersfield, in 1893. He was twice offered colonial bishopris (in Colombo and Bermuda).

In the 20th century, he moved to Lincolnshire, holding a vicarage in Boston from 1905 to 1916, before becoming Rector of Tetbury from 1916 to 1923, when he retired to Staunton in Herefordshire. He was also made a canon of Lincoln Cathedral in 1909.

He married Mary Archibald, the daughter of Sir Adams Archibald, the governor of Nova Scotia, on 29 July 1890 in Carshalton. The couple did not have children. Heygate died on 1 March 1947, survived by Mary, leaving her an estate of £4,184.
