= Gus Kennedy =

English cricketer

Personal information
- Full name: Augustus Damian John Kennedy
- Born: 10 August 1990 (age 36); London, England
- Batting: Right-handed
- Role: Wicket-keeper

Domestic team information
- Years: Team
- 2010–2012: Cambridge University
- 2013–2014: Oxford University

Career statistics
Competition	First-class
Matches	5
Runs scored	341
Batting average	56.83
100s/50s	–/3
Top score	91*
Catches/stumpings	12/–
- Source: Cricinfo, 5 July 2020

Augustus 'Gus' Damian John Kennedy (born 10 August 1990) is an English former first-class cricketer.

Kennedy was born in London, but spent much of his youth in Australia where he was educated at Christ Church Grammar School in Perth. He returned to England in his teens, where he attended Magdalen College School, Oxford. From there, he went up to Corpus Christi College, Cambridge to read economics. While studying at Cambridge, he played first-class cricket for Cambridge University from 2010–12, making three appearances in The University Match against Oxford. He scored 158 runs in his three matches for Cambridge, averaging 39.50 and with a high score of 61. He was secretary of Cambridge University Cricket Club in 2010–11 and played field hockey, gaining a Cambridge blue.

From Cambridge he proceeded to study for his masters at Wycliffe Hall, Oxford. While studying at Oxford, he made two first-class appearances for Oxford University in The University Matches of 2013 and 2014, scoring 183 runs with two half centuries and a high score of 91 not out. He gained two Oxford blues in field hockey.
