= George Childs =

English footballer

The Rev. Reginald Heygate
Personal information
- Full name: Reginald Thomas Heygate
- Date of birth: 11 August 1857
- Place of birth: Nympton St George, Devon
- Date of death: 4 March 1909 (aged 51)
- Place of death: Upper Clapton, London
- Position: Forward

Youth career
- 1872–76: Forest School, Walthamstow

Senior career*
Years	Team	Apps	(Gls)
1876–80	Oxford University		
1880–81	Swifts		
1881–82	Old Foresters		
- * Club domestic league appearances and goals

George Borlase Childs (11 August 1857 - 4 March 1909) was a Church of England vicar and association footballer who played in the 1880 FA Cup final.

== Early life ==
Childs was the third son of Thomas Cave Childs, a clergyman from Nympton St George. He was educated at Forest School, one of the earliest and most fervent hotbeds of the association game, and represented the school side in matches against adult sides from 1872.

In 1876 he went up to Magdalen College, Oxford on a demyship, and received his Bachelor of Arts in 1880.

== Football career ==
Forest School entered the FA Cup for the first time in 1875–76, and Childs captained the side in its first round tie with Oxford University, played at the Kennington Oval, which the university side won 6–0. He also played for the Essex representative side in a 1–1 draw against Surrey, also at the Oval, in February 1876.

Having gone up to Oxford, he did not break into the university first XI until the 1878–79 season, and was in "rare form" in the first round of the 1878–79 FA Cup hammering of Wednesbury Strollers, although he did not score. He did however score twice in Oxford's second round win over the Royal Engineers.

Childs played in every round of the 1879–80 FA Cup, switching from his usual right-side to the left-side of the forward line for the 1–0 win over Maidenhead in the fourth round, and he captained the side in the semi-final against the Royal Engineers. He also scored the winning goal in the semi-final against Nottingham Forest, following up a Francis Crowdy shot which had only been parried. However Oxford lost the final 1–0 to Clapham Rovers, Childs twice coming close to scoring, one shot going just wide and another being well saved by Reginald Birkett.

As he graduated in 1880, he was no longer eligible to play for Oxford University, and joined the Swifts of Slough for the 1880–81 FA Cup, playing as a left- and right-sided forward in each of the Birds' two ties. In the 1881–82 FA Cup he played for the Old Foresters in their quarter-final replay defeat to Great Marlow at the Swifts' Dolphin Ground; it was his final recorded match.

== Representative matches ==
He came close to representing England in international football; he was selected to play as a right-sided forward on 1 March 1879 fixture against Scotland at the Kennington Oval, but the match was postponed due to frost, and he was not chosen for the re-arranged fixture, replaced by Arthur Goodyer. He did however represent the London Football Association against the Birmingham Football Association in the "mini-international" in February 1880, played before a crowd of 10,000 at the Aston Lower Grounds; Childs scored the opening goal of the match, but the Birmingham FA ran out 5–2 winners.

He obtained his blue by playing in the Varsity match in 1879 and 1880, both of which Cambridge University won - Oxford was particularly unlucky in the timing of the latter as the match fell between the original semi-final and replay against the Royal Engineers in the Cup.

== Post-football career ==
He was ordained in 1881, and was curate of St. Mary-the-less, Lambeth, and York Town, Surrey, until 1885. He performed missionary work in Canada from 1886 to 1890. In 1891, after his return to England, he was appointed as secretary for the Society for the Propagation of the Gospel in the dioceses of Lichfield and Chester. He was curate of Christ Church, Reading, Berkshire, in 1896–97, of Holy Trinity, East Finchley, from 1897 to 1900, and of St. Paul, Haringey, in 1901–2.

He died on 4 March 1909, at Brook House, Upper Clapton; he had been living in Deal, Kent at the time. His estate was left to his younger brother Charles.
