= Clopton Lloyd-Jones =

English footballer

Clopton Allen Lloyd-Jones (12 November 1858 – 7 March 1918) was an English businessman and amateur sportsman, best known for football and cricket. He played for the Clapham Rovers when they won the FA Cup in 1880 and was selected, but did not play, for Wales as an international.

== Early life ==
He was born in Hanwood, Shropshire, the younger son of Charles Lloyd Jones (1828–1901), who was known as the squire of Hanwood, about three miles from Shrewsbury. Like his father, his name was not hyphenated on his birth certificate; while commonly named as Lloyd-Jones in newspaper reports, he was also at other times named as C.A.L. Jones, rarely Clopton Jones.

He studied at Trent College, where he was being reported as Lloyd-Jones by the time he left in 1875. He was one of two senior pupils who passed "Satisfied" at the Cambridge University Local Examinations of Christmas 1874 but he did not enter university.

== Football career ==
=== School ===
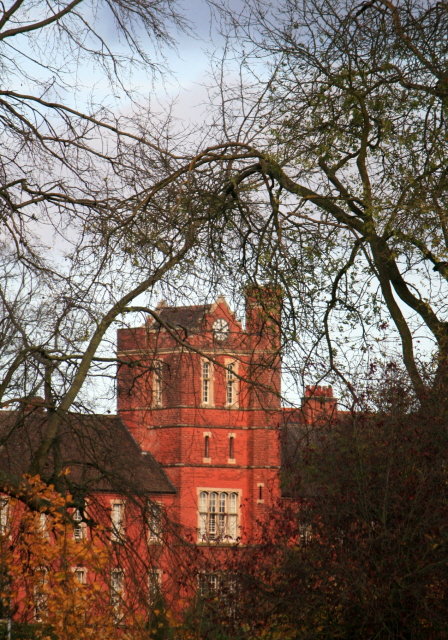
View of Trent College where he was educated.

Lloyd-Jones had been in the football XI at Trent College where he played against Nottingham Forest and was described as an outstanding player on the field. He also won two athletics cups at the school sports in 1875. He was described in the Trent College Magazine that year as "A wonderful goal getter, being fast, and able to kick in any position".

=== In London ===
After leaving Trent and arriving in London he played for; St Mary's, Peckham, for which he was reported appearing in 1876 against the 1st Surrey Rifles at Camberwell, scoring the first of his team's three goals; Southill Park (1877–78); the Pilgrims of Tottenham in a match against the Ramblers in 1879; Clapham Rovers (1879–84); the Wanderers against Oxford University in December 1880, when he scored the first and last of his side's three winning goals, the third "kicked well with his left foot on to the goal post, off which it glanced through"; and the Corinthians in their opening season (in a single match against Westminster School, 1882).

He played, without scoring, in representative inter-city association matches for London against Sheffield (13 November 1878) at Bramall Lane; Birmingham at Kennington Oval (27 November 1880), and Aston Lower Grounds (5 February 1881); Edinburgh at the Oval (30 December 1882); Glasgow at Hampden Park (20 January 1883); Birmingham at Aston (17 February 1883); the combined Oxford and Cambridge Universities at the Oval (24 March 1883); Nottinghamshire at the Oval (3 November 1883), and Glasgow at the Oval (13 December 1883).

Lloyd-Jones captained a 'fairly strong' scratch team called The Casuals against Westminster School in November 1880, winning 3–2. His team was drawn from Clapham Rovers, Pilgrims, Royal Engineers, Swifts and Hawks, as well as including two players whose clubs were not noted.

He appeared with Clapham Rovers in the first two seasons of the London Senior Cup, scoring the first of three winning goals to one against Old Etonians in round one in October 1882, and in the next season when he appeared through to the replayed losing fifth round against Upton Park, the ultimate winner of the Cup's final, in 1883.

He appeared at county level in 1883 for Middlesex versus Essex, scoring one of his side's two goals to three, and versus Norfolk when he scored the first of his team's five winning goals, as well as for Surrey against Nottinghamshire, scoring one goal to seven.

=== F.A. Cup competitions ===
He had played for Southill Park, in losing first-round ties of the F.A. Cup against Cambridge University in 1877 and the Old Harrovians in 1878 captaining his team in the latter match.

He joined Clapham Rovers in time for the start of the 1879–80 season and took part in all the ties up to the Final. He appeared without scoring against Romford in the first round, scored two out of his team's four goals against Pilgrims, and two of their four goals against South Norwood in the third. In the fifth round, in February 1880 at Kennington Oval, against the Cup's then holders, Old Etonians (who had beaten Clapham Rovers in the previous Cup Final), he scored the only goal of the match, in the first half.

He returned to the Oval on 10 April, when as the inside-forward or winger he scored the only goal when Clapham Rovers won the Cup Final against Oxford University to deserve fully his description in the Football Annual for that year as 'A very neat dribbler and dangerous shot at goal; was invaluable in the Cup Ties.' In the first half, he attempted to score twice, with a shot from the left which glanced off a goalpost, and a centre kick downfield which was saved by the Oxford goalkeeper Percival Parr. In the second half, six minutes before the close of time, the deadlock was broken when his teammate Francis Sparks conducted the ball to within "about six yards of the University goal". Although Oxford's Charles King attempted to stop the ball with a weak mis-kick, Lloyd-Jones, "who had followed well up shot it between the posts. This feat quite 'brought down the house.'" According to The Field magazine's report, there was "vociferous cheering, throwing up of hats, and other demonstrations of delight from their supporters." At the game's end, Lloyd-Jones, and his team captain Robert Ogilvie, were specially cheered by the crowd. At 21 years and 150 days Lloyd-Jones was the 'baby' of his team and the youngest Cup Final scorer in the event's then history.

He appeared for the Rovers in FA Cup ties for three further seasons. In the 1880–81 season, he scored one of his team's 15 goals to nil against Finchley in the first round. Early in the fourth round tie against Upton Park (12 February 1881) he was injured. He recovered to appear, without scoring, in their losing fifth-round tie against Old Carthusians. He did not play at all during the 1881–82 season.

In that of 1882–83 he scored one of his team's seven goals against Hanover United in second round (2 December 1882) and appeared in the third round against Windsor Home Park in the third (6 January 1883). In the fifth round, as in 1881, he appeared with his team against Old Carthusians again, scoring one of four goals to five, again on losing side. In his last London soccer season of 1883–84, he appeared in the second round against Rochester and in the losing third round against Swifts.

=== In Shropshire ===
After returning to Shropshire, Lloyd-Jones played with Pontesbury's village football club in 1884, then towards the end of that year joined up with Shrewsbury Castle Blues, playing mainly at inside-right. He made a reappearance in and for Pontesbury in February 1885 when they played at home to a visiting Llanfyllin (Montgomeryshire) team, scoring the only goal in the match.

Already known as 'the crack forward of the Clapham Rovers', his joining the Castle Blues was welcomed in the words of a football commentator writing in The Wellington Journal and Shrewsbury News: "To any of my readers who would wish to see football, I would give the advice, 'See him play'. Some may perhaps consider his play a little selfish and that he does not pass enough, but that may be when he has not players by his side on whom he can depend, or who are anything of his own calibre."

The Castle Blues had become holders of the Shropshire Senior Cup (then known as the County Cup) earlier in 1884, but Lloyd-Jones was unable to successfully add goals in further cup competitions the Castle Blues played. He played with them in the semi-final against St George's (near Wellington) in February 1885, but they lost without him scoring. The next season (1885–86) he was in a losing second round tie for the Birmingham Challenge Cup against Wolverhampton Wanderers at Shrewsbury when the Blues lost 0–5, although he attempted to head a goal, in November 1885. He also appeared in a replayed but losing first round tie for the Shropshire Senior Cup against Wellington Town, and the replayed and losing third round of the Welsh Cup against Newtown (Montgomeryshire) in January 1886, his last reported appearance in a match for the club.

The Blues disbanded voluntarily at the end of the latter season after some other members were found guilty of violent and dangerous play (at matches where he was not present) and Lloyd-Jones ended his active football career. He continued to play on occasions in scratch teams formed by Old Salopians to play the current pupil teams at Shrewsbury School, his last reported match being in March 1887.

He made one county appearance for Shropshire, against Denbighshire at Wrexham in January 1885, but muddy conditions made scoring impossible and it ended indecisively although an opponent attempted a late score judged two minutes out of time.

He was selected for Wales v England 1884–85 but unavailable. His selection for the Wales national team came about because his parents were Welsh and Castle Blues were affiliated to the Wales and Border Counties F.A.

In 1889 and 1890 he was on the committee of the Shropshire Amateur F.A. as one of Shrewsbury's representatives. In the former year he was also a member of the executive committee of the Shropshire Mayor's Charity Cup Association.

== Other sports ==
Again from his days at Trent College, he was also a keen cricketer. He had played for the Stock exchange XI and for Clapham Rovers who also ran a cricket section as well as fielding association and rugby football teams. He later played at county level for Herefordshire in 1886–89, Shropshire in 1887–89 and Radnorshire in 1888. At Shrewsbury area club level he played for Abbey Foregate, Pontesbury, Montgomery and Shrewsbury CC. He did not appear in 'first-class' matches, and he has not been found to have scored more than 40 runs, in a match for Pontesbury against Condover's CC in 1886.

In 1892 Lloyd-Jones entered a fancy dress ball held by Shrewsbury Amateur Dramatic Society under the name of Clopton Jones and in the character of a member of 'Clapham Rovers C.C.'

The month after his Cup final appearance he won two events, the mile and quarter-mile handicap races, at Clapham Rovers' annual athletic sports. He appeared at their sports again in 1883, when he won the obstacle race, came second in the 250 yards hurdle race, and third in the mile and the 120 yards handicaps, and entered but did not win four running events in 1884.

He also enjoyed fishing and shooting.

Lloyd-Jones became a full member of the Severnside Bowling Club, Shrewsbury, in 1899 and was a player until 1916, winning the club's major annual trophy, the Allcroft Vase, and being runner-up for another, the Greene Challenge Cup, in 1911 He was on the committee 1901–14 and was elected a life member in 1912. He also became involved with the Pengwern Boat Club, Shrewsbury, from 1885 though not as a competitive rower. He was on the club's committee at various times between 1888 and 1906 and was Deputy-Captain in 1896. In 1894 he was the starter at the club's annual athletics meeting.

He became a familiar sight in general Shrewsbury sporting circles and was involved as organising committee member, judge or more frequently starter at various local athletics events including the Whit Monday Fete between 1890 and 1908; starter (and in 1913 judge) at the annual Shropshire Constabulary Sports held from 1897, and those held on various commemorative occasions.

== Personal life and death ==
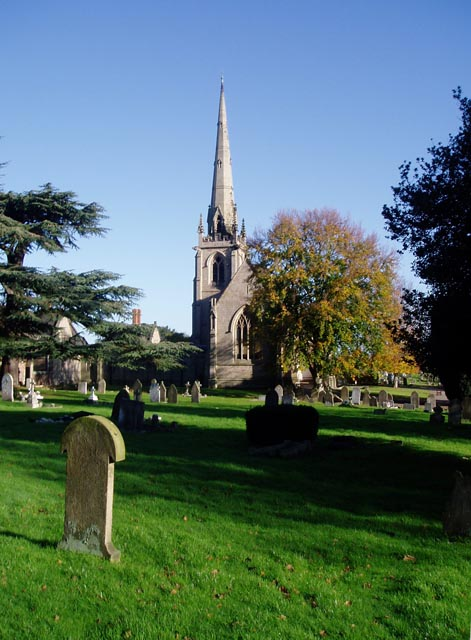
Shrewsbury Cemetery where he is buried (his gravestone not shown).

Lloyd-Jones worked in London as an indigo broker (lodging in Hetherington Road, Clapham, in the 1881 census) but during 1884 returned to Shropshire and later moved into Shrewsbury where he set up as a commission agent, i.e. a bookmaker (1891, 1901 and 1911 census).

Lloyd-Jones married on 30 October 1894, at St Chad's Church, Shrewsbury, Sarah Emma Catherine (also known as Lily), daughter of Robert Everall, a Shrewsbury builder. The couple had four children who survived him. Lloyd-Jones died on 7 March 1918, aged 59, at his last home, Montreux, Belle Vue Gardens in Shrewsbury, after what was described as 'a long and painful illness', from cancer of the bladder. He was buried on 9 March in Shrewsbury's General Cemetery in Longden Road where, more recently in 2002, the Football League's all-time leading goalscorer, Arthur Rowley, was also buried. His headstone, in section 147, bears the Italian motto Godi tu che vinci – a translation of this being "Enjoy, you who win".

== Honours ==
Clapham Rovers

- 1880 FA Cup Final: winner

At an auction in Bristol in 2008, his gold Cup winner's medal was sold for £4,200 by a descendant.
