= 15th Cruiser Squadron =

- Active: 1940–1946
- Country: United Kingdom
- Allegiance: British Empire
- Branch: Royal Navy
- Engagements: Battle of Crete; First Battle of Sirte; Second Battle of Sirte; Operation Vigorous

Commanders
- Notable commanders: Rear-Admiral Sir Philip L. Vian

The 15th Cruiser Squadron, also known as Force K, was a formation of cruisers of the British Royal Navy from 1940 to 1946.

== History ==
The squadron was formed in May 1940 and was assigned to the Home Fleet. In 1941 it was transferred to the Mediterranean Fleet where it remained for the duration of World War II. In May 1941 it served in the Battle of Crete, with its ships dispersed into several different Forces. For the duration of the battle, Rear Admiral Edward L. S. King was given command of Force C, which comprised a mixture of cruisers and destroyers. On 17 December 1941 the squadron was involved in the First Battle of Sirte against the Regia Marina (Italian Navy). On 22 March 1942 the squadron was involved in the Second Battle of Sirte against the Italian Fleet. Between 12 and 16 June 1942 it took part in Operation Vigorous. From 22 January to 5 June 1944 the squadron provided support during the Battle of Anzio. In June 1946 it was re-designated the 1st Cruiser Squadron.

== Commodore/Rear/Vice-Admiral Commanding ==
Included:

	Rank	Flag	Name	Term	Notes
Commodore/Rear/Vice-Admiral Commanding, 15th Cruiser Squadron
1	Vice-Admiral	Vice-Admiral - Royal Navy	Edward L. S. King	July 1940 – October 1941	Served as Rear-Admiral until 30 May 1941
2	Rear-Admiral	Rear-Admiral - Royal Navy	Sir Philip L. Vian	October 1941 – September 1942	
3	Rear-Admiral	Rear-Admiral - Royal Navy	Arthur J. Power	September 1942 – May 1943	
4	Rear-Admiral	Rear-Admiral - Royal Navy	Cecil H.J. Harcourt	May 1943 – January 1944	
5	Rear-Admiral	Rear-Admiral - Royal Navy	John M. Mansfield	January 1944 – March 1945	
6	Commodore		Maurice J. Mansergh	March 1945 – January 1946	
7	Rear-Admiral	Rear-Admiral - Royal Navy	Harold R.G. Kinahan	January–June 1946	
