= A. H. Savage =

English footballer

A. H. Savage was an English amateur footballer. He made one appearance for England in 1876 as a goalkeeper, and also played for the original Crystal Palace club. His identity is not definitively known; most football researchers now identify him as Arthur Henry Patrick Savage (18 October 1850 – 15 August 1905), but there are other contenders.

== Identity ==
Football historians have always had difficulty identifying the precise name and details of A.H. Savage who played for the original Crystal Palace club and played for England against Scotland in the fifth international between the countries in March 1876.

The three main contenders are:

Alfred Henry Savage, born in Reading in 1854;
Arthur Harold Savage, of the English & Oriental Hotel in Penang, who died in Penang on 4 August 1930;
Arthur Henry Patrick Savage, born in Sydney, Australia on 18 October 1850.

Even though no contemporary match reports refer to the player as A.H.P. Savage, most researchers now favour the latter.

== Football career ==
Little is known about his club career, although he was a Crystal Palace player at the time of the international, and he later played representative football for Surrey. Match reports described him as "big and red-bearded" and commented on his "terrific kick that was well used to set up attacks". Unfortunately, "defensively (he) was prone to being in the wrong place at the wrong time", thus contributing to England's defeat.

His sole international appearance came against Scotland at Hamilton Crescent, Partick on 4 March 1876. According to Philip Gibbons, at this time "the England side tended to be chosen on availability rather than skill alone." England struggled throughout the game, which saw the home team run out winners by three goals to nil.

== Photograph ==
In May 2008, a photograph of the 1876 England team was discovered in the archives of the Derby City Council Local Studies Library. Edgar Field had sent the photograph to the Derbyshire Football Express, and the picture was used in an article published on the 50th anniversary of the match. This picture came to light in May and is believed to be the earliest known picture of an England football team.

== See also ==
- List of England international footballers born outside England
