= Edward Ram =

English footballer and architect (1859–1946)

Edward Albert Ram FRIBA (24 April 1858 – 27 January 1946) was an English footballer for Clapham Rovers and prominent architect in Hong Kong during his days in early 20th century. He helped Clapham Rovers to win the 1880 FA Cup Final. From 1885 to 1927, he served as an architect in Hong Kong and formed "Denison, Ram & Gibbs". The works done by the firm were Matilda Hospital 1906, "Old Halls, the University of Hong Kong" 1913 to 1915, the Helena May main building 1916 and Repulse Bay Hotel 1920 etc.

== Early life ==
Ram was born in Hammersmith, Middlesex, to James Ram, a private tutor, and Charlotte Ram (née Gurner).

== Football career ==
Ram was one of the players of Clapham Rovers during the 1880 FA Cup Final against Oxford University A.F.C. According to the record, he was 21 and an architectural student at that time.

== Architect ==
"Denison & Ram" was founded by Albert Denison (MICE, Authorized Architect 1903-1927) and Edward Albert Ram (- 1946, FRIBA 1897, Authorized Architect 1903–1927) in 1897. Ram commenced practice in 1885 and then came to Hong Kong. He worked in Sharp & Co. in 1893. Later on, Lawrence Gibbs (MICE, Authorized Architect, 1903–1927) joined the firm to form "Denison, Ram & Gibbs" before 1902. Ram left in 1927 and practiced in Kensington until his retirement. The name of the firm became unchanged until the business ceased in 1933. The works done by the firm were Matilda Hospital 1906, Eliot and May Halls at the University of Hong Kong 1913 to 1915, Helena May 1916, Repulse Bay Hotel 1920, and the clubhouses of the Hong Kong Golf Club, including, the Happy Valley Club House 1896, the Deep Water Bay Club House 1899 and the Fanling Club House 1911 to 1914. It was said that Edward Albert Ram was a keen golfer and designed for the Club entirely on voluntary basis.
