= Crooked Billet, Penge =

Public house in London

The Crooked Billet, Penge
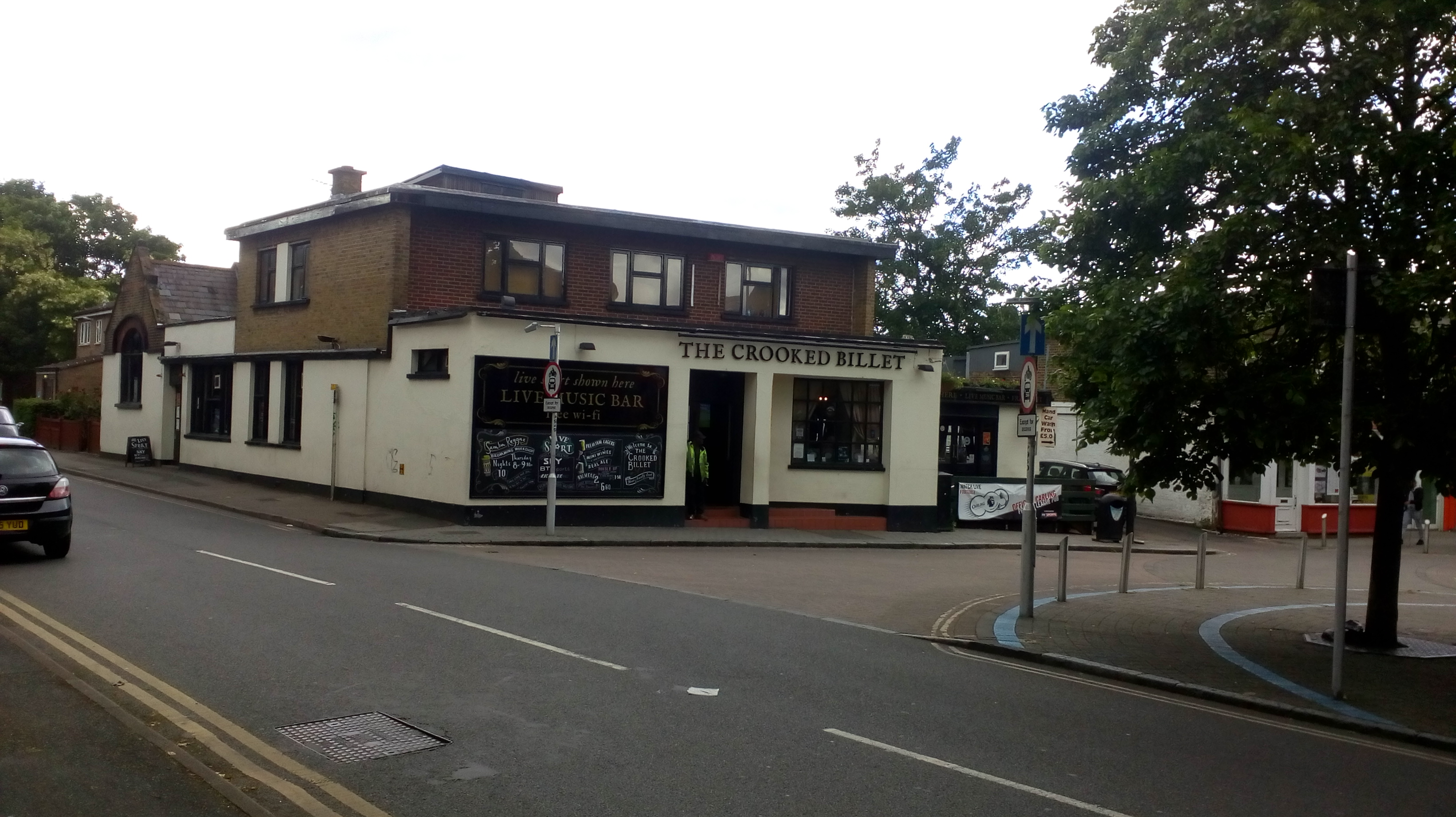
- The Crooked Billet
- Interactive map of the The Crooked Billet, Penge area

General information
- Location: 99 High Street, Penge, London SE20 7DT, London, England
- Coordinates: 51.41599°N 0.05317°W

The Crooked Billet is a public house at 99 High Street, Penge, London SE20 7DT. It was built in 1827 and is the oldest pub in Penge. It is part of the Craft Union Pub Company.

== Background ==
The name 'Penge' originates from the Celtic word ‘penceat’ which means ‘edge of wood’ in the Brittonic languages. There appears to be Celts living here for many years on what was a luscious common with medieval woodland.

== History ==
The Crooked Billet was constructed in 1827, rebuilt in 1840 and then extended in 1925.

Outside the original double-fronted house was an ancient oak tree and a wooden seat where locals sat and talked. It became a popular meeting place for many decades to come. Coaches used to stop at the old inn on their way to London to change or refresh the horses, with the coachdriver and passengers stocking up on food and home-brewed ale.

Legend has it that as the hamlet was so heavily wooded, a sign had to be placed on the main road to guide the traveller to the overnight shelter. This sign was a bent or knotted branch and the ‘crooked billet’ led to the pub's name. The building was badly damaged during the Second World War which meant the top floor had to be removed and rebuilt in the 1950s.

== In literature ==
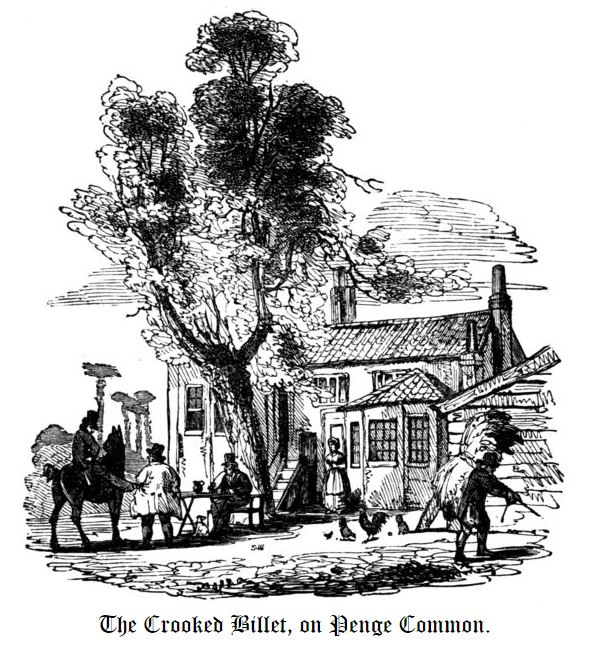
The Crooked Billet, as seen by Hone in 1827

William Hone was an English writer, satirist and bookseller. He wrote about a visit to the pub in 1827. He and a friend ate eggs, bacon and spinach from the pub garden. They sat in a comfortable parlour, with a bow-window view of Penge Common. He said the house affords as good accommodation for man and horse as can be found in any retired spot so near London. His friend sketched an illustration of the pub.

== Sport ==
A field behind the Crooked Billet pub was where the first Crystal Palace FC played their home games between 1864 and 1866 after their pitch in Crystal Palace Park became unavailable.

England's second football captain and second oldest player, Alexander Morten, played on the ground for the club and probably enjoyed some ales in the pub afterwards.

Football Association administrator Charles W. Alcock, who devised the FA Cup and international football, played on the field for the Wanderers F.C.

The Crooked Billet Ground also hosted cricket with Penge United playing matches there between 1856 and 1858. Sydenham Albion Cricket Club was using the field as their home ground in 1865. After the opening match of their season, "a very excellent lunch was provided on the ground by Mr Matthews, of the Crooked Billet Tavern, Penge."
