= Harold Brougham =

English footballer

Personal information
- Full name: Harold De Vaux Brougham
- Date of birth: 17 August 1858
- Place of birth: Liverpool, Lancashire, England
- Date of death: 26 March 1930 (aged 71)
- Place of death: Ryde, England
- Position: Forward

Senior career*
Years	Team	Apps	(Gls)
1877–1879	Barnes		
1879–1880	Clapham Rovers		
1880–1881	Wanderers		
- * Club domestic league appearances and goals

Harold De Vaux Brougham (17 August 1858 – 26 March 1930) was an English amateur footballer who played for Clapham Rovers in its 1880 FA Cup Final win.

== Career ==
Brougham was born in West Derby, Liverpool, in 1858, the son of James Rigg Brougham (a nephew of Henry Brougham, 1st Baron Brougham and Vaux) and Isabella Eliza Cropper. He was educated in Carshalton and at Malvern College.

He represented Malvern College in the annual association football match against Malvern Town for the first time in 1875, His first known match for a "senior" club was for Barnes F.C., against, ironically, Clapham Rovers in October 1877. He played in at least 8 matches for Barnes in the 1877–78 season, including the club's three FA Cup ties that season, as a right-sided forward. He also played for Barnes in 1878–79, creating one of the goals in the 3–2 win over Upton Park in the second round of the 1878–79 FA Cup with an accurate by-line cross to Johnstone.

Barnes scratched from the 1879–80 FA Cup without playing its first round tie with the Old Etonians, which proved a blessing in disguise for Brougham. As he was not Cup-tied, he was eligible to play for Clapham Rovers in the 1880 FA Cup final; the Rovers had not been able to find a consistent partner for Arthur Stanley on the wing, trying three different players in the Cup run, and Brougham made his debut for Rovers in a preparatory match against Upton Park the week before the final. Brougham duly took his place in the final line-up, his main contribution to the win being a hard shot that went just over the bar.

The match was his second, and final, game for Rovers, and his final Cup tie. His final match of any note was for the Wanderers against Oxford University in December 1880, and he seems to have bowed out of the game at the end of the year, after appearing in the annual Christmas match for the Old Malvernians against the current pupils.

== Career outside football ==
Like his father, Brougham was a barrister, who specialized in bankruptcy law; he often represented bankrupts and insolvents as trustee-in-bankruptcy. From 1906 to 1920 he was a senior official receiver.

He married Elizabeth Dorothea Puckle on 14 August 1894 in Long Wittenham and they had one son, Thomas.

He died on 26 March 1930, in Ryde, Isle of Wight, leaving an estate of £3,575 7/9 to his widow.

== Honours ==
Clapham Rovers

- FA Cup winner: 1880
