= Charles King (footballer) =

English schoolmaster and footballer

Charles James Stuart King (2 June 1860 – 28 April 1928) was an English schoolmaster and footballer.

== Early life ==
King was the fifth son of Rev. Walker King (1827–1892), Rector of Leigh-on-Sea from 1859 to 1892, and Juliana Stuart (1825–1897). His brother Robert succeeded their father as Rector of Leigh-on-Sea and was also a footballer.

On his father's side, many of his relatives were prominent clergymen, including his uncle, Rt. Rev. Edward King, Bishop of Lincoln, his grandfather, Ven. Walker King, Archdeacon of Rochester, and his great-grandfather, Rt. Rev. Walker King, Bishop of Rochester. On his mother's side, his relatives included the diplomat Robert Stuart, the artist James Stuart and the Indian Army officer Charles "Hindoo" Stuart.

King attended Felsted School from 1871 to 1878, where he was captain of the Cricket XI from 1874 to 1876 and captain of the Football XI in 1877. He later studied at Hertford College, Oxford, obtaining his B.A. degree in 1883.

== Career ==
Whilst at Oxford, King was a member of the Football XI, achieving a 'Blue' against Cambridge in 1881 and 1882. He represented the team in the 1880 FA Cup Final, where a weak mis-kick from King let in Clopton Lloyd-Jones to score the only goal of the match for Clapham Rovers.

He also played for Upton Park and in representative matches for Essex and London.

King later served as headmaster of a preparatory school.

== Personal life ==
In 1888, King was married to Violet Maud Hankin. They spent the early years of their marriage in Windom, Minnesota, where their three sons were born:

- Edward Leigh Stuart King (1889–1971), a naval officer.
- Sir Charles John Stuart King (1890–1967), an army officer.
- Sir Geoffrey Stuart King (1894–1981), a civil servant.

King died in Chardstock, Devon, in 1928 aged 67.
