= Vincent Weston =

English footballer

Vincent Edward Weston
- Born: October 1855; Kingston-upon-Thames, England
- Died: 12 December 1937 (aged 82); Shanklin, Isle of Wight
- Occupation(s): Footballer, stock dealer

Vincent Weston (October 1855 – 12 December 1937) was an English footballer and rower from the late 19th century who won the FA Cup in 1880 as a half-back for Clapham Rovers.

== Early life ==
Weston was born in Kingston-upon-Thames, London, in October 1855, the fifth son of John Weston (1817–1887) and his wife Augusta Ellen née Wood (1817–1891). His father was a merchant and financial agent.

== Rowing ==
Vincent and his four brothers, including fellow footballer Percy, were members of the London Rowing Club; being small in stature, they made perfect coxes, and "Little" Vincent was competing internationally before he was a teenager. His greatest honour as a cox was steering a London RC foursome to victory in the Stewards' Challenge Cup at Henley four times between 1868 and 1872.

== Football ==
Weston's first appearance on the football field was for Barnes - a football club associated with a rowing club - alongside two of his brothers in October 1871, against Westminster School. The following month he played for Barnes against the Civil Service in the first round of the first FA Cup.

He played 11 more times for Barnes in the FA Cup from 1872–73 to 1878–79, usually as a half-back, including in Barnes' surprise draw with Wanderers in 1877–78, being "especially notable for his accurate kicking".

For the 1879–80 FA Cup he switched allegiance to Clapham Rovers, and his first match in the competition for his new club was a 7–0 win over Romford, Weston being picked out for his conspicuous play. He played in every round, and in the final (against Oxford University) Weston - who "played admirably" - made a key defensive clearance when the match was still scoreless.

He continued to play for Rovers in the following year's competition, becoming something of a dead-ball specialist, tasked with corners and free-kicks. His final game in the competition came in a defeat to the Old Etonians in a first-round replay in 1881–82. His last recorded football appearance was captaining the Stock Exchange side against Lloyd's of London in their annual match in 1882; his former Clapham Rovers team-mate Robert Ogilvie captained the opposition.

Although he never picked up an International cap, he did represent the Football Association several times in representative matches in 1879–80.

== Later life ==
Weston became a stock dealer, in partnership with his nephew Spencer Weston. He married Edith Fanny Clara Colnaghi, who pre-deceased him, in early 1911.

Weston died in Shanklin on the Isle of Wight in December 1937, leaving assets of £422 2/- to Alan Tremlett, another Stock Exchange member.

== Honours ==
Clapham Rovers

- FA Cup winner: 1880

== Bibliography ==
- Collett, Mike (2003). The Complete Record of the FA Cup. Sports Books. ISBN 1-899807-19-5.
- Mitchell, Andy (2012). First Elevens: The Birth of International Football. Andy Mitchell Media. ISBN 978-1475206845.
