= 1880 FA Cup final =

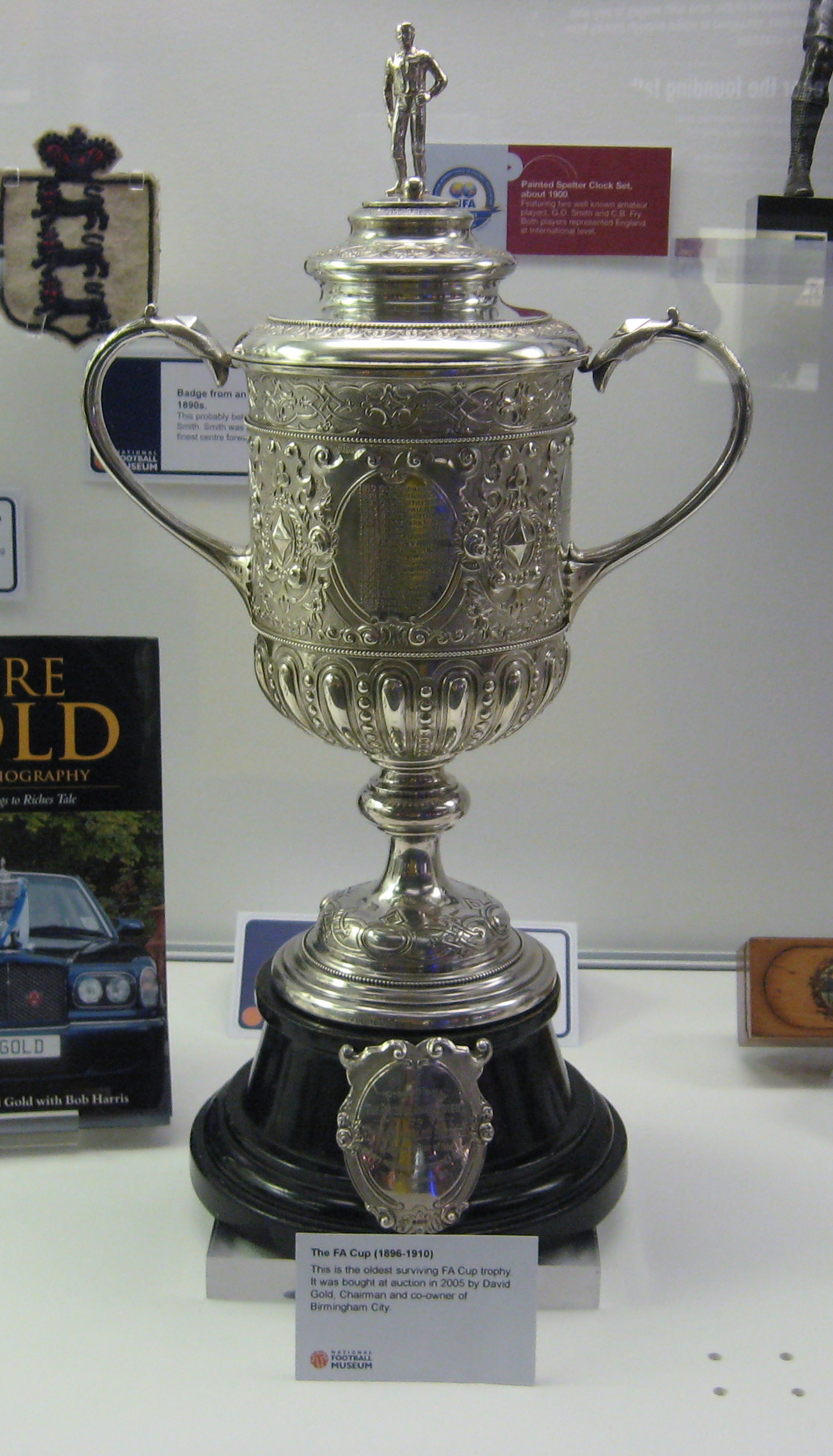
- Event: 1879–80 FA Cup
Clapham Rovers	Oxford University
1	0
- Date: 10 April 1880
- Venue: Kennington Oval, London
- Referee: Major Francis Marindin

The 1880 FA Cup final was contested by Clapham Rovers and Oxford University at the Kennington Oval. Clapham Rovers won 1–0, the only goal being scored by Clopton Lloyd-Jones.

== Overview ==
=== Weather ===
At the start of the match, a strong and cold north-easterly wind blew into the faces of the Oxford team and the wind neutralised many of their kicks but it eased considerably after half-time.

=== Scoring ===
In the first half, Clopton Lloyd-Jones attempted to score twice, with a shot from the left which glanced off a goalpost, and a centre kick downfield which was saved by the Oxford goalkeeper Percival Parr. The ball hit the Oxford crossbar with a shot from Edward Ram and Harold Brougham shot just over the same bar.

In the second half, six minutes before the close of time, the deadlock was broken when Francis Sparks conducted the ball to within "about six yards of the University goal". Although Oxford's Charles King attempted to stop the ball with a weak mis-kick, Lloyd-Jones, "who had followed well up shot it between the posts. This feat quite 'brought down the house.'" According to The Field magazine's report, there was "vociferous cheering, throwing up of hats, and other demonstrations of delight from their supporters." At the game's end, Lloyd-Jones, and his team captain Robert Ogilvie, were specially cheered by the crowd. At 21 years and 150 days Lloyd-Jones was the 'baby' of his team and the youngest Cup Final scorer to date.

== Match details ==
10 April 1880

Clapham Rovers	1–0	Oxford University
Lloyd-Jones 84'	Report

Kennington Oval, London
Attendance: 6,000
Referee: Major Marindin

C. Rovers	O. University

GK	(England) Reginald Birkett
DF	(England) Robert Ogilvie
DF	(England) Edgar Field
MF	(England) Vincent Weston
MF	(England) Norman Bailey
FW	(England) Arthur J. Stanley
FW	(England) Harold Brougham
FW	(England) Francis Sparks
FW	(England) Felix Barry
FW	(England) Edward Ram
FW	(Wales) Clopton Lloyd-Jones

GK	(England) Percival Parr
DF	(England) Claude Wilson
DF	(England) Charles James Stuart King
MF	(England) Francis Phillips
MF	(England) Bertram Rogers
FW	(England) Reginald Heygate
FW	(England) George Childs
FW	(England) John Eyre
FW	(England) Francis Crowdy
FW	(England) Evelyn Hill
FW	(England) John Lubbock

== In fiction ==
This match was subject of a spoof anecdote, written in 2006 by journalist John Walsh as a guest editor of a charity issue of The Independent in a list of five "least successful guest-star interventions in history", in which Oscar Wilde was a guest player on the Oxford team, but demurred from a chance to score at the last minute. The anecdotes are purely comedy fiction. Wilde was known for a disdain of 'manly sports' (apart from occasional boxing at university).
