= Charles King (British Army officer) =

American-born British engineer and army officer

Lieutenant-General Sir Charles King KBE CB
- Born: 13 October 1890; Windom, Minnesota, United States
- Died: 7 January 1967 (aged 76)
- Relatives: Charles King (father); Admiral Edward King (brother); Sir Geoffrey King (brother)
- Military career
- Allegiance: United Kingdom
- Branch: British Army
- Service years: 1910–1946
- Rank: Lieutenant-General
- Conflicts: First World War; Third Anglo-Afghan War; Second World War
- Awards: Knight Commander of the Order of the British Empire; Companion of the Order of the Bath; Mentioned in Despatches (2)

Lieutenant-General Sir Charles John Stuart King, KBE, CB (13 October 1890 – 7 January 1967) was a British Army officer and engineer.

== Family and education ==
King was the second son of Charles James Stuart King, a schoolmaster and footballer, and Violet Maud Hankin. He was the brother of Edward Leigh Stuart King and Sir Geoffrey Stuart King.

Born in Windom, Minnesota, United States to British parents, King went to England where he was educated at Felsted School from 1904 and 1908. He was captain of both the Football XI and the Hockey XI in 1908. He later attended the Royal Military Academy in Woolwich, passing out first in 1910 with the Sword of Honour and earning the Pollock Medal. He also studied at the Royal School of Military Engineering in Chatham.

In 1920 King married Kathleen Margaret Rudd and had three sons, all of whom also attended Felsted School:

- Rev. John Michael Stuart King (1922–2003), Vicar of Hibaldstow
- Lt. Col. Simon Charles Stuart King (1924–2002), army officer and schoolmaster
- Richard Anthony Stuart King (d. 1998)

== Military career ==
In 1910 King began his army career after receiving a commission in the Royal Engineers. He served in India throughout the First World War and in the Third Anglo-Afghan War. In 1929 he became Chief Instructor in military engineering and geometrical drawing at the Royal Military Academy in Woolwich before returning to India in 1932 with the Royal Engineers. After the Quetta earthquake in 1935, King was appointed Deputy Engineer, then Chief Engineer, to oversee the reconstruction work. He was appointed a Commander of the Order of the British Empire in the 1939 Birthday Honours for his work in Quetta.

Following the outbreak of the Second World War, King joined the British Expeditionary Force in France as Deputy Chief Engineer (1939–1940). In 1941 he was Chief Engineer for Home Defences before being appointed to the newly created post of Engineer-in-Chief at the War Office (1941–1944), where his responsibilities included work on the Bolero plan. He was appointed a Companion of the Order of the Bath in the 1943 New Year Honours. He became the Prime Minister's personal representative to the South East Asia Command in 1944 and, in the 1945 Birthday Honours, he was knighted as a Knight Commander of the Order of the British Empire.

King retired from the army in 1946 with the honorary rank of lieutenant-general. From 1946 to 1953 he was Colonel Commandant of the Royal Engineers.

== Bibliography ==
- Smart, Nick (2005). Biographical Dictionary of British Generals of the Second World War. Barnesley: Pen & Sword. ISBN 1844150496.
