= Edward King (Royal Navy officer, born 1889) =

British naval officer

Admiral Edward King CB MVO
- Born: 22 February 1889; Windom, Minnesota, United States
- Died: 8 May 1971 (aged 82)
- Relatives: Charles King (father); Lieutenant General Sir Charles King (brother); Sir Geoffrey King (brother)
- Military career
- Allegiance: United Kingdom
- Branch: Royal Navy
- Service years: 1901–1944
- Rank: Admiral
- Commands: 15th Cruiser Squadron (1940–41); HMS Despatch (1937–38); HMS Queen Elizabeth (1936–37); HMS Coventry (1930–31)
- Conflicts: First World War; Second World War
- Awards: Companion of the Order of the Bath; Member of the Royal Victorian Order

Admiral Edward Leigh Stuart King, CB, MVO (22 February 1889 – 8 May 1971) was a senior officer in the Royal Navy.

== Family and education ==
King was the eldest son of Charles James Stuart King, a schoolmaster and footballer, and Violet Maud Hankin. He was the brother of Sir Charles John Stuart King and Sir Geoffrey Stuart King.

He was born in Windom, Minnesota, United States to British parents.

== Naval career ==
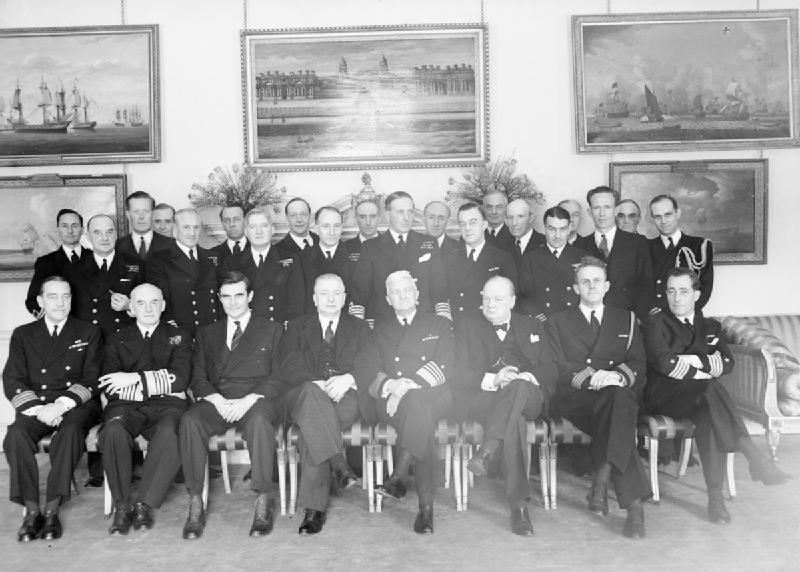
Lords Commissioners of the Admiralty during the Second World War. King is standing, eighth from the left.

King began his Royal Navy career on 15 May 1901. He was awarded the Beaufort and Wharton testimonials in 1909 and the Ronnald Megaw memorial prize for 1909–1910. Having been promoted to the rank of lieutenant-commander in 1916, he succeeded Sidney Bailey as gunnery officer of HMS Erin. At the end of the First World War he became gunnery officer of HMS Warspite and was promoted to the rank of commander in 1919.

In 1936 King was appointed to command HMS Queen Elizabeth and oversaw the start of its refit the following year. He then commanded HMS Despatch from 1937 to 1938 and became a rear-admiral in 1938. During the Second World War, he commanded the 15th Cruiser Squadron from July 1940 to October 1941, when it saw action during the Battle of Crete in May 1941. He was also a Lord Commissioner of Admiralty and Assistant Chief of the Naval Staff (U boat and Trade) from 1941 to 1942.

King became a vice admiral in 1941. Following his initial retirement in 1944, he was made an admiral in 1944 and retired again in 1946.

King was appointed a Companion of the Order of the Bath and a Member of the Royal Victorian Order in recognition of his naval service.
