= Max Rostal =

Austrian-Hungarian violist (1905–1991)

- Born: 7 July 1905; Teschen, Austria-Hungary
- Died: 6 August 1991 (aged 86); Bern, Switzerland
- Occupations: Classical violinist and violist

Max Rostal (7 July 1905 – 6 August 1991) was a violinist and a violist. He was Austrian-born, but later took British citizenship.

== Biography ==
Max Rostal was born in Cieszyn to a Jewish merchant family. As a child prodigy, he started studying the violin at the age of 5, and played in front of Emperor Franz Josef I in 1913.

He studied with Carl Flesch. He also studied theory and composition with Emil Bohnke and Matyás Seiber. He won the Mendelssohn Scholarship in 1925. In 1930–33 he taught at the Berlin Hochschule, from 1944 to 1958 at the Guildhall School of Music, and then at the Musikhochschule Köln (1957–82) and the Conservatory in Bern (1957–85). His pupils included Yfrah Neaman, Igor Ozim, Edith Peinemann, Bryan Fairfax, Lars Anders Tomter, Desmond Cecil, Gert Crafoord and members of the Amadeus Quartet.

In 1945, in honour of Flesch, he co-founded what was later known as the Carl Flesch International Violin Competition with Edric Cundell.

Rostal played a wide variety of music, but was a particular champion of contemporary works such as Béla Bartók's Violin Concerto No. 2. He made a number of recordings. Rostal premiered Alan Bush's Violin Concerto of 1946–8 in 1949. He was the dedicatee of Benjamin Frankel's first solo violin sonata (1942), and he also made the premiere recording. He commissioned the violin concerto by Bernard Stevens in 1943.

Rostal played in a piano trio with Heinz Schröter (piano) and Gaspar Cassadó (cello), who was replaced in 1967 by Siegfried Palm. He edited a number of works for Schott Music, and also produced piano reductions.

Rostal's daughter Sybil B. G. Eysenck became a psychologist and is the widow of the personality psychologist Hans Eysenck, with whom she collaborated. Rostal died on 6 August 1991 in Bern, Switzerland.

== Discography ==
- Benjamin Frankel: Sonata No. 1 for solo violin, Op. 13 (1942) on Decca K 1178
- Frederick Delius: Violin Sonata No. 2, Sir Edward Elgar: Violin Sonata, and Sir William Walton: Violin Sonata (1954 recordings, released 1955-7 on LP on Westminster), reissued on the Testament UK label, SBT1319 (2003).
- Maurice Ravel: Sonate fur Violine und Klavier, Marcel Mihalovici: 2.Sonate fur Violine und Klavier op.45 Deutsche Grammophon SLPM 138 016, 1959.
- Violin concertos by Béla Bartók (No. 2), Alban Berg, Bernard Stevens, and Dmitri Shostakovich (No. 1) recorded between 1948 and 1962, released on CD on Symposium Records, UK
- Franz Schubert: Fantasie in C major, D.934, Robert Schumann: Sonata A minor, Op. 105, Claude Debussy: Sonata, Igor Stravinsky: Duo Concertant, Symposium Records, UK
- Johann Sebastian Bach: Sonata in E minor (arranged by Howard Ferguson), Heinrich Ignaz Franz von Biber: Passacaglia, Giuseppe Tartini: Concerto in G minor, Sonata The Devil's Trill, Ludwig van Beethoven: Romances No. 1 and 2, Symposium Records, UK
- Franz Schubert: 3 Sonatas, Op. 137, No. 1-3, Rondo in B minor, Op. 70, D. 895, Sonata in A major, Op. 162, D. 574, Symposium Records, UK

== Media ==
- European Archive Copyright free LP recording of Beethoven's Kreutzer sonata by Max Rostal (violin) and Franz Osborn (piano) at the European Archive (for non-American viewers only).

== Bibliography ==
=== Books ===
- Rostal, Max (1985). Beethoven: The Sonatas for Piano and Violin: thoughts on their interpretation. Horace and Anna Rosenberg, translators, foreword by the Amadeus Quartet. With a Pianist's Postscript by Günter Ludwig and a History of Performance Practice by Paul Rolland. London: Toccata Press. ISBN 0-907689-06-X.
- Rostal, Max, Ludwig van Beethoven: Die Sonaten für Violine und Klavier, Gedanken zu ihrer Interpretation, Mit einem Nachtrag aus pianistischer Sicht von Günter Ludwig, R.Piper & Co. Verlag, Munich, 1981
- Rostal, Max, Handbuch zum Geigenspiel, unter Mitarbeit von Berta Volmer, Müller & Schade publishing house, Bern, 1993
- Rostal, Max, Violin – Schlüssel – Erlebnisse, Erinnerungen, Mit einem autobiografischen Text von Leo Rostal, Ries & Erler, Berlin, 2007

=== Editions ===
- Heinrich Ignaz Franz von Biber: Passacaglia für Violine allein, London 1951, Bern 1984
- Johann Sebastian Bach: Sonaten und Partiten, Leipzig 1982
- Wolfgang Amadeus Mozart: Violinkonzert KV 218, Mainz 1967
- Wolfgang Amadeus Mozart: Violinkonzert KV 219, Mainz 1961
- Wolfgang Amadeus Mozart: Adagio KV 261, Mainz 1964
- Wolfgang Amadeus Mozart: Rondo KV 373, Mainz 1975
- Ludwig van Beethoven: Sonaten, München 1978
- Ludwig van Beethoven: Romanzen Nr. 1 and 2, Mainz
- Ludwig van Beethoven: Violinkonzert, Mainz 1971
- Franz Schubert: Rondo A-dur, Mainz 1964
- Peter Tchaikowsky: Konzert für Violine und Orchester, Mainz 1973
- Carl Maria von Weber: Rondo Brillant op. 62, Berlin 1930/1985
- Carl Flesch: Das Skalensystem, Berlin 1987
- Jacob Dont: Etüden und Capricen op. 35, Mainz 1971
- Pierre Rode: 24 Capricen, Mainz 1974
- Henryk Wieniawski: L'École moderne op. 10, Bern 1991

=== Compositions ===
- Max Rostal: Studie in Quinten, für Violine mit Klavierbegleitung, 1955
- Max Rostal: Studie in Quarten, für Violine mit Klavierbegleitung, 1957

== See also ==
- List of émigré composers in Britain
