= Crystal Palace F.C. (1861) =

Crystal Palace
- Full name: Crystal Palace Football Club
- Nickname: The Palatians
- Founded: 1861
- Dissolved: 1876; 150 years ago
- Ground: Crystal Palace Park Cricket Ground and Crooked Billet, Penge
Home colours

Crystal Palace F.C. was a short-lived amateur football club formed in 1861, who contributed to the development of association football during its formative years. They were founder members of the Football Association in 1863, and competed in the first ever FA Cup competition in 1871–72.

The club disbanded around 1876, its last entry listing was shown in the 1875 Football Annual edition. The current professional Crystal Palace F.C. claims to be a continuation of the amateur club, after two club historians asserted a direct lineage based on the ownership of the Crystal Palace Company. The Football Association subsequently rejected this claim following a detailed review by the National Football Museum.

== History ==
=== Formation ===
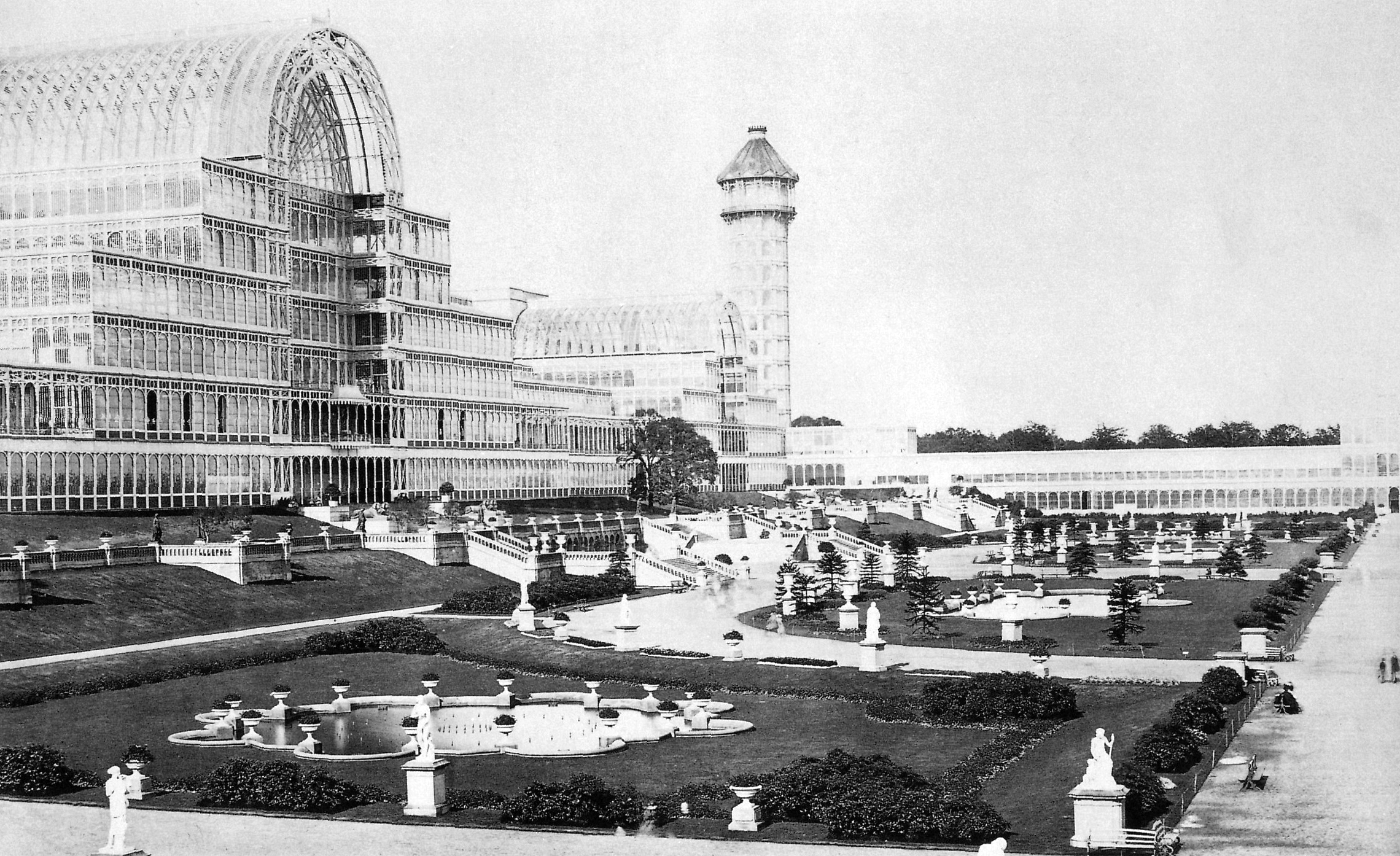
The Crystal Palace Exhibition building in 1854 at its new location in Sydenham Hill. The football club played here in two spells in the Crystal Palace Park.

In 1854, Queen Victoria opened the new Crystal Palace Exhibition building in South London near to Sydenham Hill. The building had gained fame in 1851 when it housed the Great Exhibition in Hyde Park, London. The Crystal Palace Park, which surrounded the site of the exhibition building, officially opened in 1856, and incorporated various sports facilities including a cricket ground used by the Crystal Palace Cricket Club founded in 1857. The first Crystal Palace football club was formed here in 1861, and many of its original players were members of the cricket club.

=== Grounds ===
The football club initially played in Crystal Palace Park using the cricket field. The first game recorded as being played at the Crystal Palace was on 5 April 1862 against Forest Football Club (who later became Wanderers F.C.). For the 1864–65 and 1865–66 seasons, the club moved and played on a field behind the Crooked Billet, Penge. However, the following season they were homeless, and only three games can be found recorded in the sporting press. A match report from December 1867 states that the club "last year appeared likely to become extinct, in consequence of the loss of their ground at Penge and the seeming impossibility of obtaining another to suit them." The same report states that the club would make "a fresh start… on part of the Crystal Palace Park Cricket Ground." The final game played at the Crystal Palace was against Reigate Priory F.C. on 9 January 1875. All the games for the remainder of the season and in 1875–76 were played away from home.

=== Players ===
The Football Annuals between 1868 and 1875 record the club as having between 60 and 70 members. The players were typically wealthy upper-middle-class businessmen, who had the leisure time to participate in sport.

Douglas Allport played for the club over fourteen seasons and in that time acted as club captain, treasurer, secretary and FA representative. Walter Cutbill (1843–1915) and Arthur Cutbill (1847–1929) were prominent members and both former pupils at Forest School, which was a leading school in the early development of the game.

Walter Dorling (1855–1925), the stepbrother of Isabella Beeton, played for the club between 1872 and 1875. Another player, Penge-born George Rutland Barrington Fleet (1853–1922), stage name Rutland Barrington, was later to gain fame as a star of Gilbert and Sullivan productions. Francis Luscombe (1849–1926), who captained England at rugby, played for the club between 1869 and 1871.

Committee member and goalkeeper, Croydon-born wine merchant James Turner (1839–1922) became the second treasurer of the Football Association after its formation, and various Palace players were influential committee-members of the FA during its formative decade.

When international football commenced in 1870 and 1872, players from Crystal Palace featured in both the unofficial and official versions of the first-ever international games.

Four players appeared for the England national team in full internationals against Scotland between 1872 and 1876:

- Charles Chenery (forward) (3 caps) – the earliest known contemporaneous international football diarist. Chenery maintained a diary between 1 January 1874 and 19 June 1875. The entries cover football and cricket games including his final England game against Scotland in 1874. He was the only England player to appear in the first three internationals.
- Alexander Morten (goalkeeper) (1 cap) – the oldest player ever to make a debut for England (aged 41).
- Arthur Savage (goalkeeper) (1 cap)
- Charles Eastlake Smith (forward) (1 cap)

=== Support of Association Rules ===
The club became founder members of the Football Association in 1863, and along with Wanderers F.C., Barnes F.C. and the N.N. Club, were described by Charles W. Alcock as being the four clubs who formed ‘the backbone of the Association game’ in its early years. Delegates of the club attended every AGM of the FA for its first crucial decade, during which time the Laws of the Game began to evolve. In 1867, just six delegates attended the AGM, including Crystal Palace's representative Walter Cutbill who opposed the adoption of two major Sheffield Rules laws. Proposals to adopt rouges (secondary goals either side of the main goal) and the abolition of the offside rule were both defeated.

=== Creation of the FA Cup ===
At the FA Committee meeting held on 16 October 1871 to discuss the creation of the FA Cup competition, the Crystal Palace captain and secretary Douglas Allport (1838–1915), proposed the formation of a committee to draw up the rules required for the competition. He was also part of the delegation which selected and purchased the trophy.

Palace competed in the first ever FA Cup competition in 1871–72, reaching the semi-final stage, where they lost to the Royal Engineers after a replay. This was technically the first FA Cup replay, as rule 8 of the competition allowed both teams to go through in the event of a draw, and Palace had taken advantage of that rule after draws with Hitchin F.C. and Wanderers F.C. - the latter tie after playing an innovative 2-1-7 formation, with two full-backs to cope with the extra threat from Wanderers, rather than the traditional 1-1-8 or new 1-2-7 formations. The club also played in the FA Cup over the next four seasons, but never reached as far again.

=== Demise of the club ===
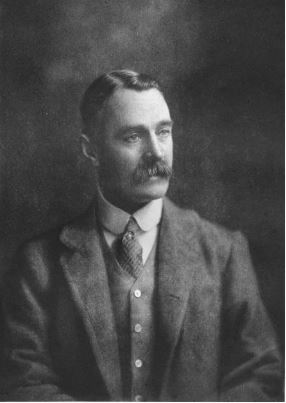
William Broderick Cloete played in Crystal Palace's final recorded match on 18 December 1875 at Barnes F.C.

After the club's last recorded home game at the Crystal Palace on 9 January 1875, a 5–0 victory over Reigate Priory F.C., sixteen away games followed, including the final recorded match against Barnes F.C. on 18 December 1875. A fixture arranged for 4 March 1876, against Westminster School at Vincent Square, did not take place because of "the inability of the Palatians to raise a team."

Until the end of the 1875–76 season, players were still showing Crystal Palace as their club of origin for representative matches, but the following season club captain Charles Eastlake Smith was appearing for Wanderers F.C.

It was the loss of a ground for a second time that resulted in the club being disbanded in 1876. There was a failed attempt to restart the club in January 1883. A team playing under the name "Crystal Palace Rovers" competed against Pilgrims F.C. in Walthamstow. The Athletic News match report stated that this was an attempt to revive "the past glories of the old Crystal Palace Club which, in its day, was one of the strongest metropolitan societies, but eventually came to grief owing to a misunderstanding with the Palace authorities about their ground."

== Link to present-day club ==
The current professional Crystal Palace F.C. claims to be a continuation of the original club, after two club historians asserted a direct lineage based on the alleged ownership of the Crystal Palace Company. This has led to claims that Crystal Palace should be recognised as the oldest professional football club in the world in existence today. However, this claim has been disputed by other football historians, and was also rejected by the Football Association after a detailed review by the National Football Museum. The FA told The Times in April 2022: "Amongst those historians, the broad consensus is that there is not a clear, substantial and continuous link from the Crystal Palace club founded in 1861 to that founded in 1905. Therefore, we will continue to recognise both the 1861 and 1905 foundation dates of the clubs named Crystal Palace." On its website, the FA states the Crystal Palace club present when the FA was formed on 26 October 1863 "has no connection with the present Premier League club."

== Colours ==
The club gave its colours as blue and white jerseys, with dark blue knickerbockers and stockings. Although there is no record of the jersey pattern, the usual design in this era was narrow hoops, unless otherwise stated.

== Records ==
- FA Cup
  - Semi-finals: 1871–72
