= Daniel Sandford (journalist) =

English TV journalist

Daniel Sandford is an English TV journalist.

== Early life and education ==
Sandford was born in 1965–66 in Oxford. His family moved to Ethiopia when he was aged 3 and he received his primary education there at the English School, which had been founded by his grandmother some 20 years earlier. The family returned to the UK after the 1974 Ethiopian revolution and he received his secondary education at Magdalen College School, an independent school for boys in Oxford, and sang as a chorister in the choir of Magdalen College, Oxford. He studied physics and electronics at the University of Southampton, graduating in 1988.

== Career ==
From January 1989 to May 1998, Sandford worked at ITN, where his roles included that of Home Affairs Producer, Africa Producer and General Reporter.

In 1998 he joined the BBC, acting as Home Affairs Producer and Health Correspondent. In 2002 he became Home Affairs Correspondent. He reported on the terrorist attacks in London in July 2005, and the airline "liquid bomb plot" of August 2006.

== Personal life ==
He is married to Caro Kriel, the former head of international news for Sky News.
