= Wayne Masterson =

Wayne Masterson PhD (1960–1991) was a British scientist who made a breakthrough in research into sleeping sickness. Masterson won a scholarship to Magdalen College School and later was an undergraduate at Magdalen College, Oxford studying biology. His main area of interest became insects and his doctoral thesis at Cambridge University was on the life cycle of the tsetse fly. He was then awarded a post-doctorate research position at the Johns Hopkins University where he made a breakthrough in synthesis of the trypanosome that carries sleeping sickness in the tsetse fly.

In 1989, Masterson was diagnosed with melanoma. Despite attempts at treatment the cancer had spread to his bowel and lungs leading to his eventual death.
