= Francis Sparks =

English footballer

Personal information
- Full name: Francis John Sparks
- Date of birth: 4 July 1855
- Place of birth: North Benfleet, England
- Date of death: 13 February 1934 (aged 78)
- Place of death: Romford, England
- Position: Forward

Senior career*
Years	Team	Apps	(Gls)
1873	St Albans Pilgrims		
- Brondesbury
1876–1878	Upton Park		
- Hertfordshire Rangers
- Clapham Rovers
- Wanderers
- Windsor

International career
1879–1880	England	3	(3)
- * Club domestic league appearances and goals

Francis John Sparks (4 July 1855 – 13 February 1934) was an English amateur footballer, who played as a forward. He won the FA Cup in 1880 with Clapham Rovers and made three appearances for England, scoring three goals and being appointed captain.

== Early life ==
Sparks was born in Billericay, Essex, and educated at King's School, Rochester between 1870-1874.

== Career ==
Sparks, who had played in his school's football XI between 1872 and 1874, also played for St Albans Pilgrims in 1873. He switched to join Brondesbury later that year for the rest of the season, and was part of the team defeated 5–0 by eventual finalists Royal Engineers in the FA Cup first round in October.

Between 1876 and 1878 he played for Upton Park before joining Hertfordshire Rangers. His first England appearance came against Scotland on 5 April 1879. The match was played at the Kennington Oval and had originally been scheduled for 1 April but was postponed because of heavy snowfall. At half time, England were 4–1 down to the Scots. Charlie Bambridge scored early in the second half and his teammates had levelled the score by the 75th minute. With less than ten minutes remaining, the Scots scored what they thought was the winning goal but the referee disallowed it as offside. The English forwards then raced upfield with Bambridge scoring the winning goal, thus enabling England to claim their first victory over the Scots since 1873 in what was described as "the most exciting England and Scotland game to date".

Sparks then joined Clapham Rovers, helping them to reach the final of the 1880 FA Cup. In the final against Oxford University Sparks was involved in the winning goal; with the prospect of extra time imminent, Sparks "made a clever run down the wing, crossed to the waiting Clopton Lloyd-Jones who had the simple task of slotting the ball between the Oxford goalposts to secure a one-goal lead." This was last appearance in an FA Cup Final for both teams.

In the month before the Cup Final, Sparks had made his last two international appearances. On 13 March he again played in the match against Scotland, this time played at Hampden Park, Glasgow. The match ended in a 5–4 victory for the Scots (the most goals England have ever scored in a game and lost). Sparks scored England's third goal, with two of England's goals coming from Charlie Bambridge, whereas Scotland's scorers included a hat-trick from George Ker. His Clapham teammate, Norman Bailey also played in this match, at half back.

Sparks' final England appearance came away to Wales on 15 March, when he was appointed team captain. Six players made their England debut in this match which England won 3–2 with two goals scored by Sparks. Tom Brindle, who also scored, had to leave the game in the second half due to injury, and England played on with ten men.

Sparks later represented Essex and London, and was a member of the Football Association Committee from 1878 to 1880. He also played cricket in the King's School XI and for Hertfordshire. He was also a member of the Wanderers club.

== Life outside sport ==
Sparks entered work as clerk in a City of London merchant's office in 1874, but by 1901 he was a "coal traveller" (or sales representative) based in Dover.

He married in September 1884. He died on 13 February 1934 aged 78.

== Honours ==
Clapham Rovers

- FA Cup winner: 1880

== International goals ==
Scores and results list England's goal tally first.

#	Date	Venue	Opponent	Score	Result	Competition
1	13 March 1880	Hampden Park, Glasgow	Scotland	3–5	4–5	Friendly
2	15 March 1880	Racecourse Ground, Wrexham	Wales	2–0	3–2	Friendly
3	15 March 1880	Racecourse Ground, Wrexham	Wales	3–0	3–2	Friendly
