= Richard Geaves =

Mexican footballer (1854-1935)

Personal information
- Full name: Richard Lyon Geaves
- Date of birth: 6 May 1854
- Place of birth: Mexico City, Mexico
- Date of death: 21 March 1935 (aged 80)
- Place of death: Yateley, Hampshire
- Position: Outside left

Senior career*
Years	Team	Apps	(Gls)
- Clapham Rovers
- Old Harrovians

International career
1875	England	1	(0)
- * Club domestic league appearances and goals

Richard Lyon Geaves (6 May 1854 – 21 March 1935) was a footballer who made one appearance for England in an international against Scotland, playing as England's outside left on 6 March 1875.

He was born in Mexico. He attended multiple schools, including Harrow School, and attended Gonville and Caius College, Cambridge. He played for Clapham Rovers and Old Harrovians, joined the 14th Prince of Wales Yorkshire Regiment and became their captain six years later before he left them in 1881. He was the first Mexico-born player to represent England.

== See also ==
- List of England international footballers born outside England
