= List of England international footballers born outside England =

This is a list of England international footballers who were born outside England. For the purposes of international football the football world governing body, FIFA, considers England, Scotland, Wales and Northern Ireland to be distinct and individual countries who share a common nationality. Players born in countries other than England may qualify for the England team through English parents or grandparents, or through residency in England or holding British citizenship. The Crown dependencies, which for footballing purposes come under the purview of the Football Association of England, have provided two players to the England football team.

Players are listed below by birthplace and played for the full England team.

== Australia ==
- Tony Dorigo
- Arthur Savage (Identity disputed)

== Belgium ==
- William Bryant

== Canada ==
- Owen Hargreaves
- Edward Hagarty Parry
- Fikayo Tomori

== France ==
=== French Guiana ===
- Cyrille Regis

== Guernsey ==
- Matt Le Tissier
- Alex Scott

== India ==
=== British India ===
- Claude Ashton
- Alfred Goodwyn
- Elphinstone Jackson
- William Kenyon-Slaney
- William Lindsay
- Stuart Macrae
- James F. M. Prinsep
- Alf Quantrill

== Ivory Coast ==
- Marc Guéhi
- Wilfried Zaha (later played for Ivory Coast)

== Jamaica ==
- Luther Blissett
- John Barnes
- Raheem Sterling

== Jersey ==
- Graeme Le Saux

== Mauritius ==
- Herbert Rawson

== Mexico ==
- Richard Geaves

== Nigeria ==
- John Salako

== Scotland ==
- John Bain

== Sierra Leone ==
- Nathaniel Chalobah
- Trevoh Chalobah

== Singapore ==
- Terry Butcher
- Basil Patchitt

== South Africa ==
- Gordon Hodgson
- Frank Osborne
- Reg Osborne
- Bill Perry
- William Rawson
- Brian Stein
- Colin Viljoen

== Sri Lanka ==
=== British Ceylon ===
- Charles Eastlake Smith

== Wales ==
- Frederick Green
- Rob Jones

== See also ==
- Australia players born in England
- Republic of Ireland players born in England
- Scotland players born in England
- United States players born in England
- Wales players born in England
