= Geoffrey King (civil servant) =

British civil servant (1894–1981)

Sir Geoffrey Stuart King, KCB, KBE, MC (1894–1981) was a British civil servant.

== Family and education ==
King was the third and youngest son of Charles James Stuart King, a schoolmaster and footballer, and Violet Maud Hankin. He was the brother of Edward Leigh Stuart King and Sir Charles John Stuart King.

Born in Windom, Minnesota, United States to British parents, he was educated at Felsted School from 1908 to 1910.

In 1920 King married Eileen May Tuke and had four sons.

== Career ==
After leaving school, King became articled to a solicitor in Chard, Somerset. During the First World War he served with the West Somerset Yeomanry in France and was awarded the Military Cross in 1919.

King then joined the Treasury Solicitor's Department. In 1929 served on the secretariat for the Conference on the Operation of Dominion Legislation and Merchant Shipping Legislation, held prior to the 1930 Imperial Conference, and in 1930 he was a delegate to the League of Nations Codification Conference, held in The Hague.

In 1944 King became Secretary of the Unemployment Assistance Board and in 1948 he was appointed Deputy Secretary of the Ministry of National Insurance.

King was the author of The Ministry of Pensions and National Insurance (1958) and Caravanning Complete (1980).

== Recognition ==
King was awarded the Military Cross in the 1919 Birthday Honours, and appointed a Companion of the Order of the Bath in the 1943 Birthday Honours, a Knight Commander of the Order of the British Empire in the 1946 Birthday Honours and a Knight Commander of the Order of the Bath in the 1953 New Year Honours.
