= Desmond Cecil =

Desmond Cecil, CMG (born 19 October 1941) is a Swiss violinist, British diplomat (CMG); civil nuclear adviser to the UK, Russian and French Governments, and pro bono European Arts Charity trustee/supporter.

== Early life and education ==
He studied at Headington County Primary School, Magdalen College School, Oxford, The Queen’s College, Oxford (MA), violin/viola with Prof. Max Rostal in Bern, Switzerland and Sascha Lasserson in London, oboe with Prof. Joy Boughton in London.

== Career ==
From 1965-70 he worked as a professional violinist/oboist in Switzerland, including as leader of the Neuchâtel Printemps Orchestra and violin professor at the Herzogenbuchsee State Academy. A fluent multi-linguist, from 1970-95 he was a British senior diplomat, with postings in Bonn, Geneva (Press), and Vienna (Chargé) for the Foreign and Commonwealth Office. Here, he was promoted to under-secretary level and was awarded the CMG by Her Majesty Queen Elizabeth II. From 1995 he worked in the civil nuclear industry, including as Senior Advisor to British Nuclear Fuels (now known as Great British Energy – Nuclear) on nuclear environment projects in Russia, for which he was formally thanked by the Russian government, Senior Vice-President/Expert Chair to Areva (France), and on the Board of the UK Nuclear Industry Association.

From 1995 – present he has worked pro bono for arts charities, including the Council of the Royal Philharmonic Society, the Trust/Council of the London Philharmonic Orchestra, the Board of Voices for Hospices, the Queen’s College Oxford Development Committee, chairing the UK Friends of the Leipzig Mendelssohn Foundation, and as International Representative of the Gstaad Menuhin Festival (formerly known as the Menuhin Festival Gstaad). Former Chairman and Trustee of the Athenaeum Club, London.

== Books published ==
- A Violin by Antonio Stradivari 1724 (self-published monograph)
- The Wandering Civil Servant of Stradivarius

== Honours ==
- 1995 Companion of the Most Distinguished Order of St. Michael & St. George (CMG)
- 2001 Official Congratulation from Russian Ministry of Atomic Energy
- 2012 Distinguished Friend of Oxford University Award
