= Magdalen College School, Oxford =

Public school in Oxford, Oxfordshire, England

Magdalen College School

Location
- Cowley Place; Oxford, Oxfordshire, OX4 1DZ; England; 51.74903°N 1.24429°W

Information
- Other name: MCS
- Type: Private day school
- Motto: Latin: Sicut Lilium (Like the Lily)
- Religious affiliation: Church of England
- Established: 1480; 546 years ago
- Founder: William Waynflete
- Local authority: Oxfordshire County Council
- Department for Education URN: 123311 Tables
- Master: Helen Pike
- Gender: Boys; Mixed (sixth form)
- Age range: 7–18
- Enrolment: 897 (2018)
- Capacity: 930
- Houses: Callender; Chavasse; Leicester; Maltby; Walker-Dunn; Wilkinson-Blagden
- Colours: Black and red
- Publication: The Lily; The Waynflete Post; Views From The Bridge (Junior School)
- Yearbook: The Lily
- Alumni: Old Waynfletes (OWs)
- Website: www.mcsoxford.org
- "Magdalen College School, registered charity no. 295785". Charity Commission for England and Wales.

Magdalen College School (MCS) is a private day school in the British public school tradition located in Oxford, England, for boys aged seven to eighteen and for girls in the sixth form (i.e. ages sixteen to eighteen). It was founded by William Waynflete in 1480 as part of Magdalen College, Oxford.

The school is run by a headmaster, who, since the foundation of the school has had the title of "the Master" and is controlled by a Board of Governors, who appoint the Master. It has both a senior school and a junior school. The Senior School has six houses, names after old attendees of the school who died in the first or second world wars. Each house is headed by a housemaster selected from the senior members of the teaching staff, of whom there are about 160. There are also six houses in the Junior School.

The school was named Independent School of the Year by The Sunday Times in 2004, and 2008, being the first boys' school to attain this accolade twice.

== History ==
=== Early history ===
The School was founded by William Waynflete as a department of Magdalen College, to teach the sixteen boy choristers of the college, who sang in the college's chapel, as well as other local children of high academic achievement. The first certain evidence of the school's existence dates to 1480, although the beginnings of the school are probably at least as early as 1478. Since then, it has grown in size from about thirty boys to over 850 children.

Over its history, the school occupied various parts of the present-day Magdalen College, firstly the low hall south of the Chapel of the Hospital of St. John the Baptist, which before the establishment of Magdalen College by William Waynflete had occupied the present site. This building, replaced by the 15th-century college buildings, stood roughly between the present-day porters' lodge and the Great Tower.

=== Grant-aided status ===
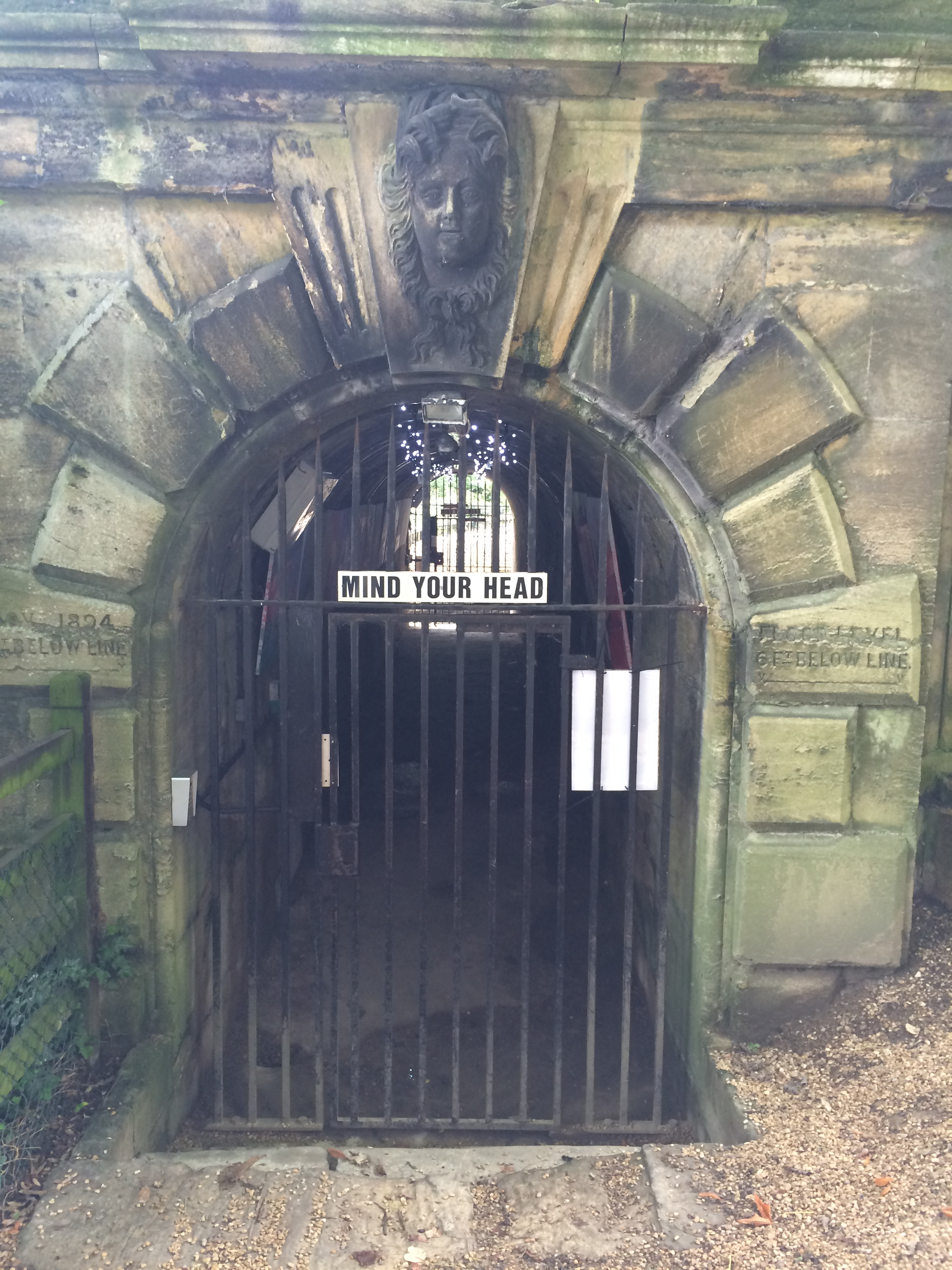
Choristers' tunnel under Magdalen Bridge, running from Magdalen College School to the Waynflete Building of Magdalen College.

After the First World War, the school opted into the arrangements of the Education (Administrative Provisions) Act 1907, and as a grant-aided secondary school had to guarantee a quarter of its places as free scholarships for boys from public elementary schools. Of this decision, Stanier, a former Master and the author of the school history, writes:

To allow the School to develop into another rich man's Public School would have been to betray a heritage and a tradition. Magdalen School had never been a school of rich men's sons, and genuine democracy had flourished in it, not only through the conscious efforts of such Masters as Millard, Ogle, and Sherwood, but also through the peculiar nature of Oxford.

The origins of the present-day school site begin in the late 19th century, when the school was occupying part of the college grounds alongside Longwall Street. It was slowly relocated by a few hundred feet, over Magdalen Bridge, onto the present site on Cowley Place began under the tenure of W. E. Sherwood in 1891 when, after an outbreak of scarlet fever in the old boarding house on the corner of Longwall Street and the High Street (ascribed partly to the dilapidated state of the building and in particular to the drainage) plans for a new school house were laid out. The new building on the Plain, which forms the modern-day School House, was first used in September 1894 when boarders at the school moved into it.

At that time, teaching still took place on the Longwall Street site. Boarders thus had a short daily walk over Magdalen Bridge to the college. The choristers still today make this short daily journey, but using a tunnel under Magdalen Bridge to avoid crossing the busy road.

The school continued to grow during the early 20th century, and by 1925, there were about 170 students.

=== Migration to Cowley Place ===
In 1928, increased pressure on the Magdalen College buildings on Longwall Street caused the migration of the entire school over Magdalen Bridge. Plans were made for new buildings designed by Giles Gilbert Scott, but this period was marked by uncertainty for the school, as in 1926 the College statute referring to the School had been altered. "Where before it had ordained that the College should always maintain the School, it now ran, 'So long as the grammar school of the College in Oxford is maintained....". As a result, temporary classrooms were built along Cowley Place, most of which are still standing today.

The buildings that the school had used on Longwall Street underwent a change of use or were redeveloped, and now form part of the College buildings: the School's original 'Big School' became the present-day "New Library" of the college, and the former school playground turned into the college's Longwall Quad.

A new school chapel was added to the 1928 buildings at the Milham Ford end, paid for by Old Boys, and was furnished with stained glass from the original chapel on Longwall Street, portraits of former Masters, Ushers, and Old Waynfletes (men educated at the school), and with an old organ built by Binns of Bramley, near Leeds. Choir stalls later donated by the Old Waynfletes and carved by Stanley Fisher completed the building, until it was eventually transformed into a Library when the present-day Big School building was opened in 1966. The stalls from the chapel of 1929 are now in the 'altar' section of the new Big School.

=== Second World War and "Bricks for wood" ===
By 1938, the school's buildings had become too small. They had always been of a timber construction, never designed for longevity. This was the topic of the 1938 Commemoration speech given by Dr John Johnson, in which a "Bricks for wood" appeal was made to nineteen other donors, to be matched by Dr Johnson in raising a total of £20,000 to rejuvenate the fabric of the school. Whilst £8,000 was promised by the end of the year, the outbreak of the Second World War curtailed any further fundraising or large-scale building for its duration.

Under the mastership of Kennard Davis, the period of the war was marked by an increase in the school's numbers, caused in part by the relative safety of the city of Oxford, while the Officers' Training Corps, precursor to the present-day Combined Cadet Force, "played its part in the defence of Oxford against possible enemy parachutists and fifth-columnists, guarding the river banks at night with fixed bayonets!". By 1949, the school had about 400 pupils. At the end of the war, the Education Act 1944 saw the school opt to become a direct grant grammar school, continuing its long-standing tradition of open education.

After the War, the school took over buildings on the site of the present-day Hard Courts and Music Department, built for civil defence, including several air raid shelters and huts, as well as buildings formerly belonging to the defunct Milham Ford School; these formed part of an expanded school which by now had several hundred pupils. A building campaign in the 1950s represented the first wave of a gradual expansion and enlargement of the school, commencing in 1951 with a five-building concrete block, and more significantly, between 1955 and 1957, the construction of the three-storey teaching block which is near the modern Colin Sanders building.

In the late 1950s, the school faced another threat: a new road was proposed, to ease traffic flow, which would have straddled both the school fields and the site of the boarding house. This plan was never set into motion, and in 1957 the school built new laboratories, on the Plain roundabout end of the site, now housing both science and Design & Technology facilities. In 1959, a movement began towards constructing the present-day Big School building, which was designed by Booth, Ledeboer, and Pinckheard and eventually opened in 1966. The new building was hexagonal, with a stage and orchestra pit at one end and an altar (given by Magdalen College) in a chapel area at the other, as well as an acoustic-panelled ceiling and a cluster of lighting.

With the opening of the new Big School, the old Big School became the school's gymnasium. With the stage removed, the floor replaced, a wall removed to connect the hall with the adjoining classroom, and with the addition of wallbars and gym apparatus, this 'temporary' building began a new phase in its long history.

=== Independence ===
By the late 1960s, the school's status as a direct grant scheme member came under threat as sweeping changes were made to the then Tripartite System. By 1976, the school was no longer a direct grant school, the Governors having opted to become fully independent.

With the demolition of the 1929 library, the ground floor open areas of the Colin Sanders building now house the Basil Blackwell library.

On 20 March 2007, David Brunton, head of media studies and English teacher at the school, was found dead at the base of St Mary the Virgin Church tower in Radcliffe Square, Oxford. His death was recorded as accidental. A bursary was set up by pupils, parents and staff in his memory.

In 2010, the school admitted girls in the sixth form for the first time, and continues to offer coeducation in the final two years (Years 12 and 13).

== Pupils' houses ==
=== House names ===
There are six houses at Magdalen, named after former prefects who died in the two World Wars. Each house is associated with a colour. They are:

House	Named after:	Colour	Died in	Notes
Callender	John Clement Callender	Emerald Green	WW1	
Chavasse	Captain Noel Godfrey Chavasse, VC and Bar, MC	Dark blue	WW1	Captain Chavasse is one of only three men ever to be awarded VC & Bar.
Leicester	Donovan Nicholas Leicester	Purple	WW1	
Maltby	Charles Robert Crighton Maltby	Light blue	WW1	
Walker-Dunn	Geoffrey Walker and Bruce Dunn	Red	WW2	
Wilkinson-Blagden	Frank D. Wilkinson MC and Maurice Bernard Blagden	Yellow	WW1	

== Sport ==
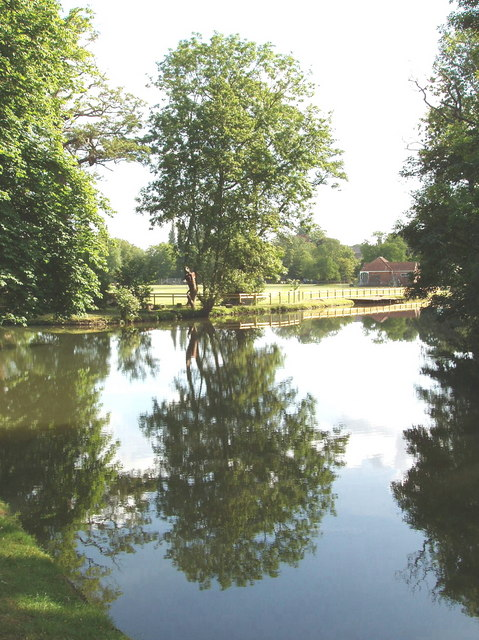
View across the River Cherwell towards Magdalen College School's playing field

School Field, an island in the River Cherwell originally leased from Christ Church in 1893, and connected by 'willow-pattern' bridges to the School House rose gardens, provides space for field sports such as cricket, rugby and football, as well as lawn tennis. The field was levelled for sports in 1907, and the present pavilion was originally constructed in 1913.

== Kingball ==
Kingball is a game played at Magdalen. The tradition, unique to the school, may have derived from Fives, for which a court was in use at the school at least as early as 1871, but the rules are more similar to the modern games of four square and Dirty Nine Square. Although to some extent the rules are passed down from year to year, every new year that takes up the game usually adopts its own rules as well. The game has been actively played during breaktimes among pupils using four courts, painted by the school. The game is still played every day at the school.

== Music ==
The Director of Music is Jon Cullen and the Assistant Director of Music is Sabrina Shortland. The school has three organs (one electric action in the school hall known as 'Big School', two digital in rehearsal rooms) and a dedicated 'Music School'. Many instruments are taught and ensembles catering to a wide variety of tastes and styles operate on a weekly basis, performing regularly. Some pupils are part of the National Youth Orchestra and National Youth Choirs of Great Britain and the school awards scholarships to dedicated and talented musicians.

The school still serves its foundational role as the school for the Choristers of Magdalen College, Oxford.

== Other schools of that name ==
Waynflete's original foundation also included a Magdalen College School at Wainfleet, Lincolnshire, which closed in 1933, and a still extant Magdalen College School at Brackley, Northamptonshire.

== Notable masters ==
- Cardinal Wolsey – Henry VIII's closest adviser
- John Sherry – Master, 1534-1540
- Charles Edward Brownrigg – Master, 1900-1930; previously Usher 1888-1900, Chairman and Host to HMC in 1907.
- Timothy Hands — Master, 2008-2016

== Notable staff ==
- Colin Hannaford – former mathematics teacher, author and educational reformist

== Notable alumni ==
Former pupils are called Old Waynfletes (OWs) after the founder.

Roughly in chronological order:

- St Thomas More – Roman Catholic martyr
- William Tyndale – translator of the Bible into English
- John Foxe – Protestant martyrologist
- Basil Blackwell – bookseller; the Library was named in his honour
- Edgeworth David – geologist, discoverer of major Australian coalfield, Antarctic explorer
- Frank Arthur Bellamy – astronomer and philatelist
- Richard Olaf Winstedt – authority on Malayan history
- Noel Chavasse VC & Bar – the most highly decorated soldier in British history.
- Henry John Stedman Cotton – Chief Commissioner of Assam; Cotton College, Guwahati is named after him
- George Bonner – King's Remembrancer, legal scholar and Senior Master of the High Court of Justice
- Haldane Campbell Stewart – organist, cricketer and composer
- Ivor Novello – singer/songwriter and actor
- Ivo Rigby – Chief Justice of Hong Kong
- Stewart Pether - cricketer
- Desmond Cecil - British diplomat (CMG), civil nuclear adviser
- John Caird – director of Les Misérables
- Christopher Peacocke – philosopher
- Nigel Starmer-Smith – BBC rugby correspondent
- Jim Rosenthal – TV sports commentator
- Adam Lively – contemporary novelist
- Martin Jones – concert pianist
- Will Wyatt - television executive
- Tim Hunt – Nobel Prize recipient and scientist
- Rick Fenn – rock guitarist, member of 10cc
- Wayne Masterson – scientist
- Guy Browning – humorous writer and film director.
- Charles Lonsdale – British Ambassador to Armenia
- Sam Mendes – Oscar-winning film and stage director.
- Misha Glenny – BBC Eastern Europe correspondent
- Rob Leslie-Carter – engineer
- Ben Goldacre – journalist
- Daniel Sandford – BBC News Home Affairs Correspondent
- Kenneth G. Wilson – Nobel Prize winner and scientist
- John Kasmin – Art dealer who promoted David Hockney
- Alexander Aris – elder son of Nobel Prize-winning democracy and human rights campaigner Aung San Suu Kyi and Michael Aris
- Julian Opie – modern artist
- Jeremy R. Knowles – Professor of Chemistry and Biochemistry at Harvard University
- Jonathan Bailey – actor
- Yannis Philippakis – frontman of the band Foals
- Oli Steadman – bassist for the band Stornoway
- Jon Briggs – television and radio presenter
- Lawrence Booth (cricket writer) - editor of Wisden Cricketers' Almanack
- Tom Scriven – Cricketer
- Omid Scobie – journalist and writer
- Martin Reynolds – Principal Private Secretary to the Prime Minister
- Roland Fleming – scientist
- Bertram Rogers — FA Cup finalist in 1880 for Oxford University A.F.C.

== Bibliography ==
Several books have been written about the school, including:

- 2019: Bebbington, David. Goodbye Shirley: The Wartime Letters of an Oxford Schoolboy 1939-1947. [Grosvenor House Publishing]. ISBN 978-1-78623-493-3
- 2016: Brockliss, Lawrence. Magdalen College School. [Shire Publications].
- 2014: Bebbington, David. Mister Brownrigg's Boys: Magdalen College School and The Great War. London: [Pen and Sword Books]. ISBN 978-1-78346-299-5.
- 1988: Orme, Nicholas Education in Early Tudor England: Magdalen College Oxford and its School, 1480–1540 [Magdalen College].
- 1980: Clarke, D. L. L. Magdalen School: Five Hundred Years on [Blackwell].
- 1977: Hey, Colin Magdalen Schooldays 1917–1924 [Senecio].
- 1940: Stanier, R. S. Magdalen School [first edition, Clarendon Press, 1940; second edition Blackwell, 1958].

Two novels are acknowledged to be set in the school:

- The novel North by long-serving former Head of English Brian Martin (Macmillan New Writing, 2006) is widely acknowledged to be set in the school, although it is not mentioned by name. Many of the school's teaching staff who served in the early-to-mid-2000s are only thinly disguised when they crop up as central characters in the novel, although despite rumours to the contrary the titular pupil "North" appears to be a fictional compound of several old boys (part of plot concerns his love affair with a teacher).
- Another novel which is clearly based on a fictional version of the school is The Singing Time by Maida Stanier, wife of a former Master (Michael Joseph, 1975).

== See also ==
- List of the oldest schools in the United Kingdom
