= Norman Bailey (footballer) =

English footballer (1857–1923)

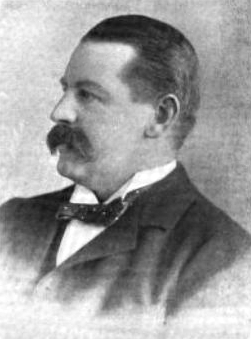
- In The Sketch, 13 February 1901
- Born: Norman Coles Bailey; 23 July 1857; Streatham, London, England
- Died: 13 January 1923 (aged 65); Cowley, London, England
- Education: Westminster School
- Occupations: Footballer, solicitor

Norman Coles Bailey (23 July 1857 – 13 January 1923) was an English footballer from the late 19th century who made 19 appearances for England playing at half back.

== Playing career ==
Bailey was born in Streatham and was educated at Westminster School, whom he represented at football. He subsequently played for the Old Westminsters, Clapham Rovers, Wanderers, Swifts and Corinthian, as well as earning representative honours for Surrey and London. At his peak he was described as "a very safe half-back, with plenty of dash and judgement; he has both strength and pace and never misses his kick".

He was a member of the Clapham Rovers team that reached the FA Cup final twice, losing 1–0 to Old Etonians in 1879, and going on to win the cup in 1880 with a 1–0 win over Oxford University at The Kennington Oval.

He made 19 appearances (scoring once) for the England national football team between 1878 and 1887 (and was thus the first player to make more than ten appearances for his country) and captained England fifteen times.

== After football ==
He was a solicitor by profession, qualifying in 1880, and served on The FA Committee between 1882 and 1884, becoming vice-president from 1887 to 1890.

He died at Cowley, Middlesex on 13 January 1923.

== Honours ==
Clapham Rovers

- FA Cup winner: 1880
- FA Cup finalist: 1879
