= Edgar Field =

English footballer

Personal information
- Full name: Edgar Field
- Date of birth: 29 July 1854
- Place of birth: Wallingford, Berkshire, England
- Date of death: 11 January 1934 (aged 79)
- Place of death: Derby, England
- Position: Full back

Senior career*
Years	Team	Apps	(Gls)
- Reading
–1880	Clapham Rovers		

International career
1876–1881	England	2	(0)
- * Club domestic league appearances and goals

Edgar Field (29 July 1854 – 11 January 1934) was an English amateur footballer who helped Clapham Rovers win the FA Cup in 1880. He made two appearances for England as a full back.

== Career ==
Field was born in Wallingford, then in Berkshire, and attended Lancing College where he played in the school team, before leaving to play for Reading during the mid-1870s. He later joined Clapham Rovers before his first international match; he also represented Berkshire and Buckinghamshire.

He made his international debut against Scotland at Hamilton Crescent, Partick on 4 March 1876. According to Philip Gibbons, "the England side tended to be chosen on availability rather than skill alone." England struggled throughout the game, which saw the home team run out winners by three goals to nil.

He was a member of the Clapham Rovers team that reached the FA Cup final twice, losing 1–0 to Old Etonians in 1879, and going on to win the cup in 1880 with a 1–0 win over Oxford University at The Kennington Oval.

His second and final cap came five years after his first, also against Scotland on 12 March 1881. Although most reports credit John Smith with a hat-trick, at least two sources say Field scored an own goal. If he did, he was the first player to do so in an England match. England went down to a "humiliating" 6–1 defeat.

== Career outside football ==
Field was described as a wine merchant in Wallingford at the 1891 Census, but he was a Chartered Accountant by profession. He practised initially in London, ultimately moving to Derby in 1913 just prior to the First World War. He joined the land agents Messrs Shaw and Fuller of College Place, Derby, where one of the partners Mr. Fuller was his brother-in-law. Field died at his home in Derby on 11 January 1934, aged 79.

In May 2008, a photograph of the 1876 England team was discovered in the archives of the Derby City Council Local Studies Library. Field had sent the photograph to the Derbyshire Football Express, and the picture was used in an article published on the 50th anniversary of the match. This is believed to be the earliest known picture of an England football team.

== Honours ==
Clapham Rovers

- FA Cup winner: 1880
- FA Cup finalist: 1879
