= Charles Eastlake Smith =

English footballer (1850–1917)

Personal information
- Full name: Charles Eastlake Smith
- Date of birth: 4 October 1850
- Place of birth: Colombo, Ceylon
- Date of death: 10 January 1917 (aged 66)
- Place of death: Bromley, England
- Position: Forward

Senior career*
Years	Team	Apps	(Gls)
1869–1876	Crystal Palace		
- Wanderers

International career
1876	England	1	(0)
- * Club domestic league appearances and goals

Charles Eastlake Smith (1850 – 10 January 1917) was an English amateur footballer who played for the first Crystal Palace and England. By profession, he was an insurance clerk.

== Early life and education ==
Smith was born in Colombo, Ceylon in 1850, son of James Smith and Matilda, daughter of the physician Edward Rigby. The Smiths lived at 18, Falkner Square, Liverpool, later moving to 21, Longton Grove, Lewisham, Kent (now counted as part of southeast London). His father James had been born in Scotland and was an East Indian Merchant. He was educated at Rossall School in Lancashire and played in the school football XI in 1869 and 1870 being captain in his final year. Smith suffered from some degree of deafness; his mother's eldest sister, the author and literary critic Elizabeth, Lady Eastlake, refers to him in some letters to others as "my dear deaf Charlie" and "my dear deaf Chas Eastlake Smith".

== Football ==
Smith played for the original Crystal Palace and later Wanderers as a forward; in 1876 he won an international cap when he played for England against Scotland.

Smith served on the Football Association committee in 1875 and 1876.

== Family ==
In 1880 Smith married Lizzie E., daughter of George P. Cooper, of Lethen Grange, Sydenham, Kent. Smith's aunt, Lady Eastlake, wrote of her in 1880 "yesterday my dear deaf Chas Eastlake Smith (Matilda's 2nd son) married a good girl with sufficient fortune." They had a son, Claude Eastlake Smith, and a daughter, Gladys Shirley Eastlake Smith, who became a tennis player and was an Olympic gold medalist in 1908.

Smith was the cousin of fellow England international, Gilbert Smith.

Smith compiled and edited after his aunt Elizabeth, Lady Eastlake's death the Journals and Correspondence of Lady Eastlake from her notebooks and letters. After her death, Smith came into possession of a bust of his aunt by the sculptor William Theed, but as of 2009 "its present whereabouts are unknown".

Smith died in Bromley, London on 10 January 1917.

== See also ==
- List of England international footballers born outside England
