= Robert Ogilvie =

English footballer

Robert Andrew Muter Macindoe Ogilvie (20 October 1852 – 7 March 1938) was an English footballer who made one appearance as a defender for England in 1874, and was a member of the Clapham Rovers team that won the 1880 FA Cup Final.

== Football career ==
Ogilvie was born at 7 Doughty Street, Mecklenburgh Square, London, and was educated at Brentwood School before joining Upton Park in 1871. After two years with Upton Park, he joined Clapham Rovers in 1873.

He made his solitary England appearance on 7 March 1874 against Scotland, playing as a defender. After "a most competitive game", Scotland won 2–1, with Robert Kingsford scoring England's goal in the 22nd minute before the Scots scored twice.

He was captain of the Clapham Rovers team that reached the FA Cup final twice, losing 1–0 to Old Etonians in 1879, going on to win the cup in 1880 with a 1–0 win over Oxford University at The Kennington Oval.

Ogilvie served on the F.A. committee between 1874 and 1881 and again between 1884 and 1886. He was also the referee for the match between England and Scotland played at the Kennington Oval on 3 March 1877. England lost the match 3–1; this was England's first defeat on 'home soil'.

== Professional career ==
In his professional life, Ogilvie was a member of Lloyd's of London, becoming chairman of the Institute of Lloyd's Underwriters from 1910 to 1911. He worked as an underwriter for the Alliance Assurance Company until 1914.

Throughout World War I, he served with the War Risks department.

Ogilvie died on 7 March 1938 aged 85 at Golf Cottage, St John's, Woking, Surrey. He also at the time had a home at 18 Sheffield Terrace, Campden Hill, London.

== Honours ==
Clapham Rovers

- FA Cup winner: 1880
- FA Cup finalist: 1879
