= Clapham Rovers F.C. =

English sports organisation

Clapham Rovers
- Full name: Clapham Rovers Football Club
- Nickname: Rovers
- Founded: 10 August 1869
- Dissolved: 1914
- Ground: Clapham Common, Tooting Bec Common, Wandsworth Common
Home colours	Away colours

Clapham Rovers was a leading English sports organisation in the two dominant codes of football, association football and rugby union. It was founded in 1869 and was a prominent club in the late 19th century, but was dissolved in 1914 amid World War I. The club played variously on Clapham Common, Tooting Bec Common, and Wandsworth Common and wore a cerise and French-grey kit.

== History ==
The club was formed on 10 August 1869 by a meeting arranged by W. E. Rawlinson, who, on the formation of the club, was elected honorary secretary. At this first meeting, it was agreed to play under both codes, with association rules to be played one week, and rugby the next. This peculiar feature in the constitution of the club obtained for the club the sobriquet of the "Hybrid Club". The first match was played on 25 September 1869, against the Wanderers, at that time arguably the strongest association club. Despite the prowess of their opponents the Rovers won 1–0. The Rovers were equally successful under rugby rules, and such was their gathering reputation by January 1870, they had sufficient membership to enable the club to play two matches every Saturday, one under each code. At the close of the 1870 season, only two matches had been lost, one under each rule, and in both instances, the return match was won, (under rugby rules, with the Marlborough Nomads; under association, with Charterhouse School).

Clapham Rovers were one of the fifteen teams to play in the first edition of the FA Cup, in 1871–72. The first ever FA Cup goal was scored by Clapham Rovers' Jarvis Kenrick, in a 3–0 victory over Upton Park on 11 November 1871.

=== Association football ===
Rovers' greatest achievement was winning the FA Cup in 1879–80 with a 1–0 win over Oxford University at Kennington Oval. Their team in the 1880 FA Cup Final was:

Reginald Birkett, Robert Ogilvie, Edgar Field, Vincent Weston, Norman Bailey, Arthur Stanley, Harold Brougham, Francis Sparks, Felix Barry, Edward Ram, Clopton Lloyd-Jones.

Lloyd-Jones (the youngest player in the side) scored the only goal of the game.

The previous year, Clapham Rovers had also reached the final but lost 1–0 to Old Etonians. In this match, Clapham Rovers' James Prinsep set a record for being the youngest player in an FA Cup Final, at 17 years and 245 days, a record that held until 2004 when it was broken by Millwall's Curtis Weston.

Clapham Rovers were also one of ten founder members of the Surrey County Football Association, in 1877. The club however remained amateur after the legalization of professionalism in 1885, and so fell into obscurity; its last FA Cup appearance was a 6–0 first round defeat to the Old Brightonians in the first round in 1886–87. The club's fall from grace was so sudden that it never even reached the final of the Surrey Senior Cup, first played for in 1882–83.

=== Rugby union ===
The club's strength in rugby was borne out by their record: from 1870 to 1881 the club played 151 Rugby games, winning 80, losing 30, and drawing 41. During the 1870s they fielded a team that had four internationals: R. H. Birkett (who was captain), his brother, Louis Birkett, and the Bryden brothers. Additionally, Crampton and Walker were well-regarded forwards and Clapham was known to have "the strongest combination of the time behind the scrummage". The club was reckoned to be the first to have introduced passing into the rugby game.

On 26 January 1871, 32 members representing twenty-one London and suburban football clubs that followed Rugby School rules (Wasps were invited but failed to attend) assembled at the Pall Mall Restaurant in Regent Street. E.C. Holmes, captain of the Richmond Club assumed the presidency. It was resolved unanimously that the formation of a Rugby Football Society was desirable and thus the Rugby Football Union was formed. A president, a secretary and treasurer, and a committee of thirteen were elected, to whom was entrusted the drawing-up of the laws of the game upon the basis of the code in use at Rugby School. R. H. Birkett represented The Rovers and was one of the thirteen original committee members.

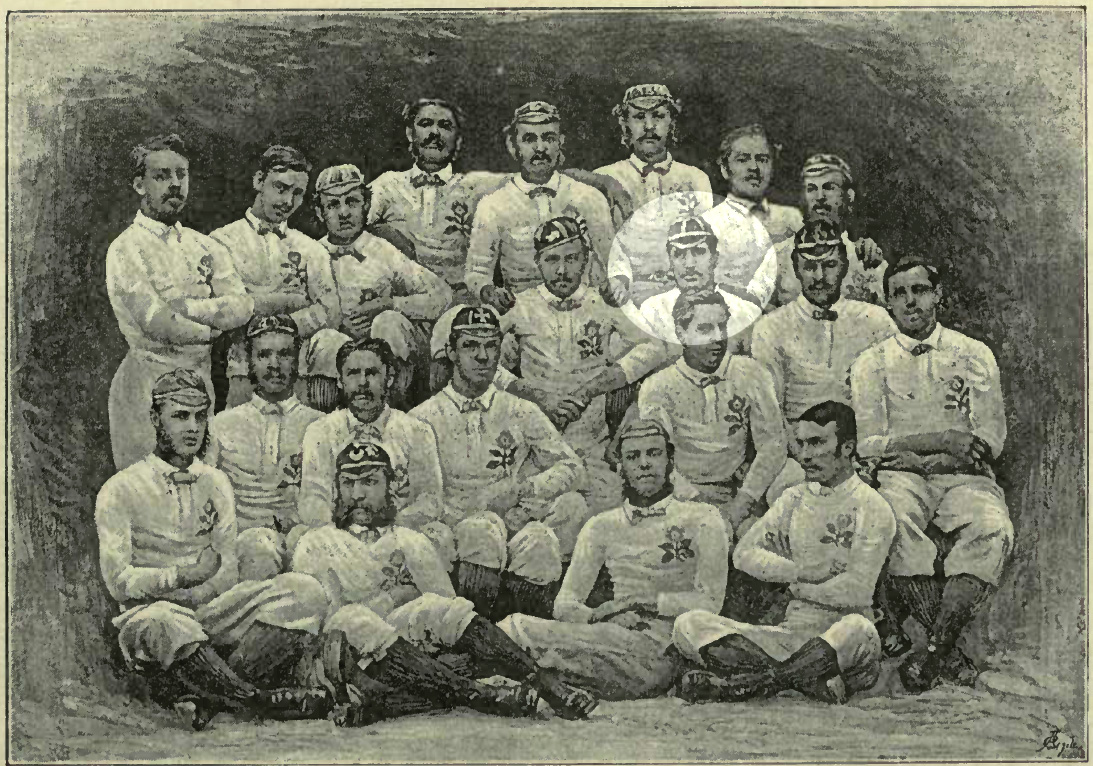
1871 England squad with Rovers player R. H. Birkett highlighted

The first international rugby match was played between Scotland and England in 1871 and The Rovers provided R. H. Birkett. In this match he scored England's first ever try.

When the club played one of the strongest and most well established clubs, Richmond, for the first time on 21 October 1871, they won the match by 1 goal and 2 tries. At the end of the 1870–71 season the club moved from Clapham Common, to a field at Balham, where they continued to play till 1876, when they moved to Wandsworth, where they were still playing in 1892.

=== Dissolution ===
The club survived until 1914 and their last recorded match was a 2–1 win over the Royal Military College at Sandhurst on 14 February 1914. The club announced that it was ceasing activities for the duration of World War I and never re-emerged when hostilities ended in 1918. The club lost three players during the war and Captain Begg who was the driving force behind the club was injured.

== Colours ==
The club played in cerise and French grey halves; Louis Birkett suggested the combination, having been taken by them on a dress worn by one of his sisters.

== International players ==
=== Association football ===
Eight Clapham Rovers players played for England between 1874 and 1887, who were as follows (caps in brackets):

- Norman Bailey (19 caps)
- Reginald Birkett (1 cap)
- Walter Buchanan (1 cap)
- Edgar Field (2 caps)
- Richard Geaves (1 cap)
- Robert Ogilvie (1 cap)
- James Prinsep (1 cap)
- Francis Sparks (2 caps)

The following players represented "England" in the representative matches played between 1870 and 1872:

- T.S. Baker (1 match)
- Jarvis Kenrick (1 match)
- Alexander Nash (1 match)
- R.S.F. Walker (3 matches, 4 goals)

=== Rugby football ===
- R. H. Birkett (first capped 1871)
- Henry Bryden (first capped 1874)
- L. H. Birkett (first capped 1875)
- Charles Bryden (2 caps, 1875 and 1877))

== See also ==
- Clapham Common Club (C.C.C.)
- Football in London
- List of football clubs in England
- Rugby union in London
- List of rugby union clubs in England
