= The English Game =

2020 British historical drama series

- Genre: Historical drama
- Created by: Julian Fellowes; Tony Charles; Oliver Cotton
- Written by: Julian Fellowes; Tony Charles; Oliver Cotton; Ben Vanstone; Gabbie Asher; Sam Hoare; Geoff Bussetil
- Directed by: Birgitte Stærmose; Tim Fywell
- Starring: Edward Holcroft; Kevin Guthrie; Charlotte Hope; Niamh Walsh; Craig Parkinson; James Harkness; Ben Batt
- Composer: Harry Escott
- Country of origin: United Kingdom
- Original language: English
- No. of episodes: 6

Production
- Executive producers: Julian Fellowes; Rory Aitken; Eleanor Moran; Ben Pugh; Ben Vanstone
- Producer: Rhonda Smith
- Production location: England
- Running time: 43–55 minutes
- Production company: 42

Original release
- Network: Netflix
- Release: 20 March 2020

The English Game is a British historical sports six-part television drama about the origins of association football in England. Developed by Julian Fellowes for Netflix, the six-part series was released on 20 March 2020. While the series is set primarily in Lancashire, it was filmed in Yorkshire.

== Premise ==
In the 1870s, football in the United Kingdom was a sport for the wealthy. A working-class star and his upper-class counterpart come together to change the game forever.

== Cast ==
=== Main ===
- Edward Holcroft as Arthur Kinnaird
- Kevin Guthrie as Fergus Suter
- Charlotte Hope as Margaret Alma Kinnaird
- Niamh Walsh as Martha Almond
- Craig Parkinson as James Walsh
- James Harkness as Jimmy Love

=== Supporting ===
- Ben Batt as John Cartwright
- Gerard Kearns as Tommy Marshall
- Henry Lloyd-Hughes as Alfred Lyttelton
- Kerrie Hayes as Doris Platt
- Joncie Elmore as Ted Stokes
- Mary Higgins as Ada Hornby
- Sam Keeley as Smalley
- Harry Michell as Monkey Hornby
- Philip Hill-Pearson as Tom Hindle

=== Recurring ===
- Daniel Ings as Francis Marindin
- Kate Phillips as Laura Lyttelton
- Kelly Price as Lydia Cartwright
- Anthony Andrews as Lord Kinnaird
- Sylvestra Le Touzel as Lady Kinnaird
- Sammy Hayman as Davy Burns
- Lara Peake as Betsy Cronshaw
- John Askew as Jack Hunter
- Michael Nardone as Douglas Suter
- Eilidh Fisher as Moira Suter
- Kate Dickie as Aileen Suter

== Episodes ==
No.	Title	Directed by	Written by	Original release date
1	"Episode 1"	Birgitte Stærmose	Julian Fellowes, Tony Charles, Oliver Cotton & Ben Vanstone	20 March 2020
Arthur Kinnaird is captain and star player of the Old Etonians, an upper class football team. Their opponents in the 1879 FA Cup Quarter finals are Darwen FC, a working class factory team. James Walsh, the owner of Darwen FC and the associated mill decides to secretly pay two Scottish players, Fergus "Fergie" Suter and James "Jimmy" Love to join his team in a bid to secure the FA Cup (which at the time is exclusively for amateurs). At halftime the Old Etonians lead 5-1, however after Suter is appointed as captain during the interval, Darwen recover with a progressive adjustment (spreading out their formation and focusing on passing) to draw 5 all. The Old Etonians, who also happen to be FA Board members, decide that since extra time was not previously agreed to then the Quarter final will be replayed instead. The mill has financial issues and townsfolk pitch in to help pay for the trip. The replay is handily won by Old Etonians who focus more on shutting down Suter and Love rather than playing their own game. Darwen FC are greeted positively for their efforts by the town.
2	"Episode 2"	Birgitte Stærmose	Julian Fellowes & Ben Vanstone	20 March 2020
Suter meets with Walsh and persuades him to change some football strategies. Stokes, a team member, goes to Kinnaird’s bank to ask for a loan. Some Darwen mill workers talk about strike as a result of a prior 5 per cent wage cut. The Cotton Guild imposes another 10 per cent wage cut. Darwen workers walk out. The team refuses to train or play in matches while on strike. Suter fails to persuade Walsh to go against the guild. Workers go to the guild to demand a 5 per cent wage cut and fewer hours to help fight the oversupply that has caused the price of goods to fall. The guild refuses. Workers riot. Kinnaird is saved from the riot by Stokes. Against Kinnaird’s wishes, Stokes goes in his place to warn Colonel Jackson (the guild leader) that the mob is coming for him. Police show up and arrest Stokes and kill his dog. Stokes is put on trial and sentenced to 15 years in prison. Kinnaird testifies on behalf of Stokes and saves him from prison and gives him his loan. Walsh agrees to the 5 per cent wage cut and to work five days a week if the team plays their upcoming match. While waiting on the team at the match, Suter is approached by the manager of Blackburn FC and is offered £100 upfront and a £6 weekly wage increase. Suter turns him down as the team arrive to play.
3	"Episode 3"	Birgitte Stærmose	Julian Fellowes & Gabbie Asher	20 March 2020
Suter goes home to Glasgow to visit his poor family and drunken, abusive father who tries to shame Suter for being paid to play. Kinnaird and his wife continue to mourn the loss of her pregnancy six months earlier. Once back in Lancashire, Suter meets with Cartwright, the Blackburn FC manager and accepts his offer but needs a few days to make it right with Jimmy, Walsh and the Darwen team. After practice with the Etonians, teammates talk about the “epidemic” of working-class teams joining the Football Association. While the gentleman scoff at the conditions of the working poor, Kinnaird comes to their defence. The Darwen team are out celebrating Jimmy’s stag party. Mr. Walsh tells Suter that he’s proud of his decision to bring Suter on to the team. Suter thanks him but doesn’t mention the deal with Blackburn. Clearly drunk, Suter gets in a fight with another Blackburn player recently hired from Partick when he compares Suter to his drunken father. The following day, at the match between Darwen and St Luke’s, Suter arrives late and plays terribly. Darwen lose 3-0 and are out of the FA Cup. Suter storms off the pitch. At home, Suter tells Doris about the deal with Blackburn and says that he will tell Jimmy after the wedding. Jimmy practises his vows and Doris overhears. At the wedding, Jimmy tells all that he finally feels like he has a home in Darwen. As Suter begins his best man’s speech, he is interrupted by a teammate who reads a Blackburn ad about Suter joining the team, shocking everyone.
4	"Episode 4"	Tim Fywell	Julian Fellowes & Sam Hoare	20 March 2020
At the Darwen mill, Walsh shames Suter for his choice to leave. Suter tries to persuade Jimmy to come with him. Jimmy refuses, saying that Darwen is his team and his family now. Cartwright shows Suter the new facilities and stands. He shows off new teammates, including Jack Hunter from Sheffield, and tells Suter he is assembling a team of the best players north of Eton. Cartwright asks Walsh for his discretion regarding Suter’s professionalism and offers him £100, and a share of receipts from next week's Blackburn versus Darwen exhibition match. After being seen talking familiarly with Mr Cartwright (with whom she previously had a child), Martha is fired from her job at the Cotton Master’s club. Mr Cartwright offers her money to help but Martha refuses, saying she needs to find her own way. At the Blackburn v Druids match, Suter struggles to mesh with his new teammates. Hunter is hailed the hero. Suter talks with Jimmy, who calls him a Judas. Suter tells Jimmy that he is trying to get his family away from his father. Suter again asks Jimmy to join Blackburn. Later, Jimmy stands up for Suter against the Darwen team and tells them he is joining Blackburn. On the way to the match between the Old Etonians and Preston, the Etonians discuss how football is becoming a booming business and is no longer just a game. The FA President complains that if it continues, only the richest teams will win and is planning to watch the exhibition match between Darwen and Blackburn to find evidence to expel them from the FA cup. The match between Darwen and Blackburn is rough and Jimmy’s leg is badly broken by a tackle and the blood loss threatens both his life and his leg.
5	"Episode 5"	Tim Fywell	Julian Fellowes & Geoff Bussetil	20 March 2020
Jimmy is told he will never play football again. Cartwright tells the Blackburn team that a portion of the match proceeds will go to help Jimmy’s recovery. Cartwright asks Suter how Martha and her daughter are doing after her job loss. After Cartwright tells his wife about the affair, she goes to Martha’s house and offers to care for her daughter, Jenie. Martha refuses. Martha tells Suter about Cartwright and Jenie. Martha goes back to talk with Mrs Cartwright and apologises for the affair with her husband. Suter and Martha kiss. Tommy, the player who injured Jimmy, visits to apologise. Suter arrives and tells Jimmy the team will support him financially and they are struggling to replace him. Later, Suter pushes Jimmy in a cart to the pub to cheer him up. Darwen teammates start to reconcile with Suter. Stokes talks about his business success making football kits. Doris asks after a job for Jimmy. Kinnaird has a falling out with his friend over the true reason behind missing the quarter-final match. After some tense discussions with his father about his football career, Kinnaird uses his football contacts to help save a vital investment. Kinnaird debates the merits of paying players with the Etonians. The Lancashire teams band together to beat the elite teams. Mr. Walsh pressures Tommy to join Blackburn to replace Jimmy. Cartwright offers Suter the captainship (and a bonus) if they make it to the final. Mrs Cartwright offers Martha a job at Brockshall and says she can bring Jenie. Two days later the FA Board meets without Kinnaird and discuss expelling Darwen and Blackburn from the cup.
6	"Episode 6"	Tim Fywell	Julian Fellowes & Ben Vanstone	20 March 2020
The FA Board votes to expel Blackburn. Kinnaird is furious. Later Kinnaird has it out with his friends about their betrayal. Walsh, now the head of the Lancashire FA, holds a meeting to figure out how to fight the ban. Suter offers to talk to Kinnaird. Walsh gives Suter a new suit so that he will fit in with the elite. Suter discusses the merits of professional players. Suter argues that the elites' banning of professionals is not fair because they are not working all day to put food on the table. They both agree they play for the love of the game. At the Board meeting Suter argues in favour of letting Blackburn play. The Board stands by their decision to ban Blackburn from the cup. Walsh tells him the Lancashire FA and most other county FAs will withdraw from the FA Cup and form a new association, with Kinnaird as its president. Kinnaird argues that the working-class teams will overwhelm the elite teams unless they include the working class, and persuades the Board to let Blackburn play. At the match, the 1883 FA Cup Final, the Etonians are playing well but in a very physical way. The score is 0-0 at half-time. One of the Etonian players is injured but they agree to keep playing anyway. Suter scores with a header from Tommy's pass. In the last moments of the match, Kinnaird scores on a breakaway. The teams agree to extra time. Suter sits out a player to make the match fair and gives the players a rousing pep talk. He scores the winning goal and lifts the cup to overwhelming cheers. In 1885, the FA officially allows professional players and an amateur team never wins the cup again. Kinnaird becomes the FA President and serves for 33 years until his death in 1923.

== Production ==
In April 2018, it was announced Downton Abbey creator Julian Fellowes would write and executive produce his first Netflix series. Birgitte Stærmose and Tim Fywell are directing, Rory Aitken, Eleanor Moran and Ben Pugh of 42 are executive producing, and Ben Vanstone is co-executive producing.

The cast was announced in May 2019 as production began in England, mostly in the North.

The epilogue reads: "In 1885 the FA changed their rules to allow professional players. An amateur team never won the FA Cup again. Arthur Kinnaird became President of the FA, serving 33 years until his death in 1923. Fergus Suter and Jimmy Love are recognised as pioneers of the modern game, which now has over four billion fans across the world."

== Historical accuracy ==
Fergus "Fergie" Suter and James "Jimmy" Love joined Darwen separately, with the former joining second in 1878 – Suter was a stonemason, not a mill worker, and would not have come to Darwen to work in a mill. Jimmy Love did not join Darwen to be a paid player, but in fact fled his home in Glasgow when a warrant was put out for his arrest over debts he owed. There is no evidence that he ever joined a Blackburn team permanently, though he did appear for Blackburn Rovers in a friendly against Darwen in 1879. His footballing career was ended in 1880, though not because of a bad tackle but instead as he was recruited into the Royal Marines. Three years later he died of enteric fever while garrisoned with them in Egypt.

A recurring storyline in the series is Arthur Kinnaird's failure to have a child and the resulting effects that it has, particularly on his wife who sees child-raising as her raison d'être. In reality, Arthur and his wife had no such problems. They had their first child in 1876, several years before the start of the show, and went on to have another six children over the following quarter of a century, most of whom survived childhood. Alma Kinnaird is shown as having a miscarriage in the second episode, which – though not specified – must have taken place in late 1879. This could not have happened as Alma in fact gave birth to the couple's second child in August of that year.

=== Football ===
After the first couple of episodes the exact dates of events is not explicitly mentioned, though it is suggested that the entire series takes place over just over one season, with Suter winning the cup with Blackburn the year after he joined Darwen. In fact Suter did not win the FA Cup until his sixth season in Lancashire.

At the time, Blackburn had two teams: Blackburn Olympic and Blackburn Rovers. The English Game appears to merge the two sides, with the club only ever referred to as "Blackburn Football Club" or just "Blackburn" and shown playing in maroon shirts – both Blackburn Olympic and Blackburn Rovers instead played in a combination of blue and white. The maroon colour may have been chosen to differentiate Blackburn from the Old Etonians, who are always shown wearing Eton blue shirts. Blackburn Olympic were the first club of working-class background to win the FA Cup, triumphing in the 1882–83 season. Of the two teams, Suter in fact joined Blackburn Rovers, with whom he lost the 1882 FA Cup Final 1-0 against the Old Etonians before winning the cup three times in succession later in the decade.

The matches depicted in the show most closely resemble Blackburn Olympic's 1883 victory. Old Etonians' and Blackburn Olympics' matches in the quarter-finals, semis and the final are all referenced accurately except for Old Etonians' quarter-final where they in fact played Hendon. Darwen are shown as being eliminated from the competition by Derby St Luke's but the Derby club did not actually participate in the FA Cup until the 1884–85 season, and the two sides never met in a competitive fixture.

The first episode depicts Darwen playing just one replay against the Old Etonians in the 1878–79 FA Cup and losing. In fact, Darwen took the Old Etonians to two replays – after the first match was drawn 5–5, the first replay finished 2–2 before Old Etonians finally beat them at the third attempt by a score of 6–2.

== Release ==
A trailer was released on 5 March 2020.

== Reception ==
The review aggregator website Rotten Tomatoes reported a 55% approval rating based on 20 critic reviews, with an average rating of 5.5/10. On Metacritic, the series has a weighted average score of 62 out of 100, based on four critics, indicating "generally favorable" reviews.
