= Jimmy Love (footballer) =

Scottish footballer

Personal information
- Full name: James Love
- Date of birth: 17 March 1858
- Place of birth: Glasgow, Scotland
- Date of death: 27 September 1882 (aged 24)
- Place of death: Ismailia, Egypt

Senior career*
Years	Team	Apps	(Gls)
- Partick
1878–1879	Darwen		
- * Club domestic league appearances and goals

James Love (17 March 1858 – 27 September 1882) was a Scottish footballer who is acknowledged as one of the first professional football players in England, having played for Darwen in the late 1870s. He was a native of Glasgow and played for Partick before moving to England to play for Darwen. He died in 1882 whilst serving in the British military in Egypt.

== Early life ==
Love was born in Gushetfaulds Cottage in Glasgow in 1858. He set himself up as a street-cleaning contractor in Partick but got into financial difficulties and in October 1878, his two horses and his equipment, including a street-sweeping machine, were sold off at a public warrant sale. Shortly afterwards he was summoned to the Glasgow bankruptcy court but he failed to show up and the court postponed the case for a month.

On 21 November 1878, he again failed to appear and the local Sheriff issued a warrant for his arrest. It was never served as he had left Scotland and moved to Darwen.

== Football ==
Whilst working, Love initially played for Partick (not the same club as the modern Partick Thistle) and had already visited Lancashire with Partick in the 1878 New Year. In summer 1878 he joined Lancashire club Darwen, arriving before fellow Partick player Fergus Suter.

He scored twice against Eagley in the 1878–79 FA Cup second round and scored two more in the third round victory over Remnants at the Oval, and was in top form when Darwen faced Old Etonians in the famous 5–5 draw on 13 February 1879 where he scored twice in second half comeback from a 5–1 deficit. He was an integral part of the team that season, with the club playing a benefit match for Love and Suter in April 1879. Early the next season he played three times for Darwen, but after the defeat of Haslingden in the Lancashire Cup on 25 October, he disappeared from the team.

The following month he played in a friendly for local rivals Blackburn Rovers. His only other official appearance was in what is thought to be his final football match, on 10 January 1880 for the village side in Haslingden.

== Royal Marines career ==
In February 1880 he signed up for the Royal Marines in Liverpool. By 1881 he was a corporal. In 1882 the Marines were called into action and Love was posted to Egypt during the occupation of Alexandria which followed the Anglo-Egyptian War. Whilst in Egypt he fell ill with enteric fever and died in the military hospital in Ismailia. He is commemorated on the memorial in Tel-el-Kebir cemetery. His family were in 1883 sent a campaign medal recognising his service. He is also commemorated on a Royal Marine memorial in Rochester Cathedral.

== Portrayals ==
Love is one of the characters in the Netflix mini-series The English Game (2020), played by James Harkness.
