= Unity FC =

Unity FC may refer to:

- Unity FC (Canada), a Canadian soccer team
- Unity FC (Ghana), a Ghanaian football team
- Unity FC (England), a defunct English football team
