= 1878–79 FA Cup =

1878–79 FA Cup (8th edition)
Tournament details
- Country: England
- Dates: 19 October 1878; 29 March 1879
- Teams: 43

Final positions
- Champions: Old Etonians A.F.C. (1st title)
- Runners-up: Clapham Rovers F.C.
- Semifinalists: Nottingham Forest F.C.

Tournament statistics
- Matches played: 42
- Goals scored: 179 (4.26 per match)
- Top goal scorer(s): Harry Goodhart (Old Etonians A.F.C.) (8 goals)

The 1878–79 Football Association Challenge Cup was the eighth staging of the FA Cup, England's oldest football tournament. Forty-three teams entered, although five of the forty-three never played a match.

The Quarter final matches between the Old Etonians and Darwen are depicted in Julian Fellowes's drama series, The English Game:

" Arthur Kinnaird is captain and star player for the Old Etonians. Their opponents in the 1879 FA Cup Quarter finals are Darwen, a working class factory team. James Walsh, the owner of Darwen FC and the associated mill decides to secretly pay two Scottish players, Fergus "Fergie" Suter and James "Jimmy" Love to join his team in a bid to secure the FA Cup (which at the time is exclusively for amateurs). The Old Etonians, who also happen to be FA Board members, decide that since extra time was not previously agreed to then the Quarter final will be replayed instead. The mill has financial issues and townsfolk pitch in to help pay for the trip. The replay is handily won by Old Etonians who focus more on shutting down Suter and Love rather than playing their own game. "

== Calendar ==
| Round | Date | Fixtures | | | | | Clubs | New entries this round |
| Round | Date | Original | Plays | Replays | Walkovers | Byes | Clubs | New entries this round |
|---|---|---|---|---|---|---|---|---|
| First round | 19 October - 16 November 1878 | 21 | 16 | 2 | 6 | 1 | 43 → 22 | 42 |
| Second round | 4 December 1878 - 4 January 1879 | 11 | 11 | 1 | 0 | 0 | 22 → 11 | 1 |
| Third round | 11 January - 6 February 1879 | 5 | 5 | 0 | 0 | 1 | 11 → 6 | none |
| Fourth round | 13 February - 15 March 1879 | 3 | 3 | 2 | 0 | 0 | 6 → 3 | none |
| Semi-finals | 22 March 1879 | 1 | 1 | 0 | 0 | 1 | 3 → 2 | none |
| Final | 29 March 1879 | 1 | 1 | 0 | 0 | 0 | 2 → 1 | none |

== First round ==
| 19 October 1878 | Barnes F.C. | 1–1 | Maidenhead F.C. | Barnes Green, Barnes |
| | Dorling | | Tilley |

| 28 October 1878 | Sheffield F.C. | 1–1 | Grantham F.C. | Bramall Lane, Sheffield |
| | Thomas Sorby | | Hutchinson |

| 30 October 1878 | Upton Park F.C. | 5–0 | Saffron Walden Town F.C. | West Ham Park, West Ham |
| | Mitchell; J. Hunter; W. Williams; Unknown |

| 2 November 1878 | Forest School F.C. | 7–2 | Rochester F.C. | The Common, Walthamstow |
| | Unknown | | Unknown |

| 2 November 1878 | Old Harrovians A.F.C. | 8–0 | Southill Park F.C. | Harrow School Grounds, Harrow on the Hill |
| | Howell; Lowis; Edward Prior; Colbeck; Hadow |

| 2 November 1878 | Oxford University A.F.C. | 7–0 | Wednesbury Strollers F.C. | The Parks, Oxford |
| | Unknown |

| 2 November 1878 | Romford F.C. | 3–1 | Ramblers F.C. | Unidentified, Romford |
| | Barnes; Lyon; Thirlwell | | Andrews |

| 9 November 1878 | Cambridge University A.F.C. | 2–0 | Hertfordshire Rangers F.C. | Parker's Piece, Cambridge |
| | Harvey; Wild |

| 9 November 1878 | Brentwood F.C. | 1–3 | Pilgrims F.C. | County Cricket Ground , Brentwood |
| | Sparham | | Mott; Grieve |

| 9 November 1878 | Grey Friars F.C. | 2–1 | Great Marlow F.C. | The Old Spotted Dog Ground, Upton |
| | Unknown | | Unknown |

| 9 November 1878 | Reading F.C. | 1–0 | Hendon F.C. | Reading Cricket Ground, Reading |
| | Holbrook |

| 9 November 1878 | Royal Engineers A.F.C. | 3–0 | Old Foresters F.C. | Chatham Lines, Chatham |
| | Unknown |

| 9 November 1878 | Swifts F.C. | 2–1 | Hawks F.C. | Dolphin Ground, Slough |
| | William Bambridge; Turner | | Ram |

| 9 November 1878 | Wanderers F.C. | 2–7 | Old Etonians A.F.C. | The Oval, Kennington, London |
| | Jarvis Kenrick; Unknown | | Novelli; Calvert; Harry Goodhart; Alfred Lyttelton; Sedgwick; Unknown |

| 16 November 1878 | Notts County F.C. | 1–3 | Nottingham Forest F.C. | Trent Bridge, West Bridgford |
| | Owen | | John Turner 5'; Arthur Goodyer; Arthur Smith |

| ?? November 1878 | Runnymede F.C. | draw | Panthers F.C. | Railway Inn, Egham |

| Clapham Rovers F.C. | w/o | Finchley F.C. |

| Darwen F.C. | w/o | Birch F.C. |

| Minerva F.C. | w/o | 105th Regiment F.C. |

| Remnants F.C. | w/o | Unity F.C. |

| South Norwood F.C. | w/o | Leyton F.C. |

| Eagley F.C. | bye |

=== Replays ===
| 9 November 1878 | Maidenhead F.C. | 0–4 | Barnes F.C. | York Road, Maidenhead |
| | | | Wylie; Chamberlain; H.A. Hudson |

| 16 November 1878 | Grantham F.C. | 1–3 | Sheffield F.C. | London Road Ground, Grantham |
| | Britten | | J. Barber; J. Willey |

| Panthers F.C. | w/o | Runnymede F.C. |

== Second round ==
| 4 December 1878 | Cambridge University A.F.C. | 3–0 | South Norwood F.C. | Parker's Piece, Cambridge |
| | Jarvis; Martin; Wild |

| 7 December 1878 | Clapham Rovers F.C. | 10–1 | Forest School F.C. | Wandsworth Common, Wandsworth |
| | Payne; Stanley Scott; Edgar Smith; Giles; Edward Growse; Arthur Stanley; Unknown | | Shaw |

| 7 December 1878 | Darwen F.C. | 0–0 | Eagley F.C. | Barley Bank, Darwen |

| 7 December 1878 | Grey Friars F.C. | 0–3 | Minerva F.C. | The Old Spotted Dog Ground, Upton |
| | | | Bain; Hearn; Turner |

| 7 December 1878 | Oxford University A.F.C. | 4–0 | Royal Engineers A.F.C. | The Parks, Oxford |
| | George Childs; Mulholland; Page |

| 18 December 1878 | Reading F.C. | 0–1 | Old Etonians A.F.C. | Reading Cricket Ground, Reading |
| | | | Unknown |

| 21 December 1878 | Nottingham Forest F.C. | 2–0 | Sheffield F.C. | Forest Recreation Ground, Nottingham |
| | H. Moss 55' (o.g.); Arthur Smith 85' |

| 21 December 1878 | Old Harrovians A.F.C. | 3–0 | Panthers F.C. | Harrow School Grounds, Harrow on the Hill |
| | Prior; Unknown |

| 21 December 1878 | Remnants F.C. | 6–2 | Pilgrims F.C. | Aldin House, Slough |
| | Edward Parry; Edward Hawtrey; Lionel Keyser | | Grieve; Wohgeluth |

| 21 December 1878 | Swifts F.C. | 3–1 | Romford F.C. | Dolphin Ground, Slough |
| | Charlie Bambridge; Parry | | Lyon |

| 4 January 1879 | Barnes F.C. | 3–2 (a.e.t.) | Upton Park F.C. | Barnes Green, Barnes |
| | Johnstone; Chamberlain | | Segar Bastard; J. Hunter |

=== Replay ===
| 21 December 1878 | Darwen F.C. | 4–1 | Eagley F.C. | Barley Bank, Darwen |
| | Jimmy Love; Gledhill; Marshall | | Sarples |

== Third round ==
| 11 January 1879 | Old Etonians A.F.C. | 5–2 | Minerva F.C. | The Meadows, Eton |
| | Julian Sturgis; Harry Goodhart | | Thompson; Ware |

| 28 January 1879 | Old Harrovians A.F.C. | 0–2 | Nottingham Forest F.C. | Harrow School Grounds, Harrow on the Hill |
| | | | Sam Widdowson 15'; A.W. Welch 80' (o.g.) |

| 30 January 1879 | Remnants F.C. | 2–3 (a.e.t.) | Darwen F.C. | Aldin House, Slough |
| | Edward Hawtrey | | Jimmy Love; Thomas Bury |

| 6 February 1879 | Clapham Rovers F.C. | 1–0 (a.e.t.) | Cambridge University A.F.C. | Wandsworth Common, Wandsworth |
| | Edward Growse |

| 6 February 1879 | Oxford University A.F.C. | 2–1 | Barnes F.C. | The Parks, Oxford |
| | Blaine; Unknown | | Dorling |

| Swifts F.C. | bye |

== Fourth round ==
| 13 February 1879 | Old Etonians A.F.C. | 5–5 | Darwen F.C. | The Oval, Kennington, London |
| | Harry Goodhart; Edward Christian (footballer)Edward Christian; Herbert Whitfeld | | Jimmy Love; Unknown |

| 25 February 1879 | Nottingham Forest F.C. | 2–1 | Oxford University A.F.C. | Forest Recreation Ground, Nottingham |
| | Arthur Goodyer; Arthur Smith | | Blaine |

| 8 March 1879 | Clapham Rovers F.C. | 8–1 | Swifts F.C. | Wandsworth Common, Wandsworth |
| | Norman Bailey; Stanley Scott; (Frederick o Stanley) Rawson; Arthur Stanley; Unknown (o.g.) | | Bain |

=== Replays ===
| 8 March 1879 | Darwen F.C. | 2–2 | Old Etonians A.F.C. | The Oval, Kennington, London |
| | William Kirkham; Thomas Bury | | Charles Clerke; Herbert Whitfeld |

| 15 March 1879 | Old Etonians A.F.C. | 6–2 | Darwen F.C. | The Oval, Kennington, London |
| | Harry Goodhart; Sedgwick; Charles Clerke; Herbert Whitfeld | | Marshall; Fergie Suter |

== Semi finals ==
| 22 March 1879 | Old Etonians A.F.C. | 2–1 | Nottingham Forest F.C. | The Oval, Kennington, London |
| | Herbert Whitfeld; Charles Clerke | | J. Bishop 55' | Attendance: 700 |

| Clapham Rovers F.C. | bye |

== Final ==
| 29 March 1879 | Old Etonians A.F.C. | 1–0 | Clapham Rovers F.C. | The Oval, Kennington, London |
| | Charles Clerke 59' | | | Attendance: 5000; Referee: Charles Alcock |

== See also ==
- FA Cup
- FA Cup Final
