= Cecil Keith-Falconer =

English footballer (1860–1899)

Personal information
- Full name: Cecil Edward Keith-Falconer
- Date of birth: 10 October 1860
- Place of birth: Horsham, Sussex, England
- Date of death: November 1899 (aged 39)
- Place of death: Hopetown, Northern Cape, Cape Colony
- Position: Forward

Senior career*
Years	Team	Apps	(Gls)
1877–1880	Swifts		
1879	Clapham Rovers		
1879–1880	Old Carthusians		
- * Club domestic league appearances and goals

Cecil Edward Keith-Falconer DSO (10 October 1860 – November 1899) was an English amateur footballer who played for Clapham Rovers in the 1879 FA Cup Final.

== Football career ==
Keith-Falconer was the son of the Hon. Charles Keith-Falconer and grandson of the 7th Earl of Kintore. He was educated at Charterhouse School, which was one of the earlier pioneers of the association game; he was good enough at the Charterhouse code to play as a forward for the prestigious Seven in the annual match against the Eleven.

His earliest association match of any note came for the Swifts in March 1877, against his own school, albeit this was due to him being one of four Carthusians to switch sides after the Swifts turned up to the school short-handed. Nevertheless, he made enough of an impression to play for the Swifts in the 1877–78 season while still also playing for Charterhouse.

He played his first competitive football in the 1878–79 FA Cup, for Clapham Rovers, on the left-wing. His first such match was in the fourth round, for the Rovers against, ironically, the Swifts, for whom he had played two weeks before the Cup tie. The Rovers won with ease after E. H. Bambridge had to retire hurt after 10 minutes.

This result put the Rovers into the Cup final, as a lopsided draw meant the Old Etonians and Nottingham Forest were the only other teams remaining, and Keith-Falconer retained his place for the final, albeit moved to centre-forward. The opponents, the Old Etonians, were slight favourites, and justified that verdict with a 1–0 win, the Rovers seemingly tiring sooner in the second half.

For the 1879–80 FA Cup, the lure of the school was too strong, and he played for the Old Carthusians, which was now entering the competition, although he only took part in two further Cup ties - a win at Acton in the first round in 1879–80 and a win over Dreadnought in the second round in 1880–81, providing the cross for the first goal in the latter.

He also continued playing for the Swifts, his last appearance for them coming in the first round of the first Berks & Bucks Senior Cup, in a 1–0 win over the Remnants. His final recorded match was for the Old Carthusians against the Old Westminsters at Vincent Square in December 1880, scoring once in a 2–1 win. By the 1881–82 FA Cup Keith-Falconer had stepped back to being the nominated umpire for the Old Carthusians.

== Military career ==
Keith-Falconer was commissioned into the Northumberland Fusiliers in January 1883. From 1887 to 1890 he was aide-de-camp to Sir Henry Loch, originally when he was Governor of Victoria and latterly in Cape Colony. He served in the Sudan campaign in the 1890s and, after attending the Staff College, Camberley from 1894 to 1895, was promoted to lieutenant colonel in 1898.

He was killed near the start of the Second Boer War, when on a reconnaissance mission near Belmont in November 1899. He had married Georgina Blagrave in London six months before.
