= Rob Williams (British screenwriter) =

British screenwriter and producer

- Occupations: Screenwriter, television producer
- Known for: The Victim; Chasing Shadows; Suspicion; The Witness

Rob Williams is a British screenwriter and producer, best known for the BBC1 crime drama The Victim.

== Career ==
Prior to his career in screenwriting, Williams worked in publishing. In 2008, he was awarded a place on the BBC Writer's Academy, a programme designed to train new writers for their long running television series. He went on to write for all four of the BBC's popular continuing dramas: Doctors, EastEnders, Casualty and its spinoff, Holby City. Williams also wrote episodes of Killing Eve, The Man in the High Castle and DCI Banks.

In 2014, ITV broadcast Williams' thriller Chasing Shadows. The series follows a missing persons unit, and stars Reece Shearsmith as Sean Stone, a detective Sergeant, and Alex Kingston. The series of four episodes concluded on 25 September 2014.

In 2019, his four-part thriller miniseries The Victim, produced by STV Studios, was broadcast on BBC One. It starred Kelly Macdonald, James Harkness and John Hannah, in a story about a murdered child's mother going on trial for inciting murder after she is accused of posting online the new identity and address of the man she believes murdered her son. Williams teamed again with STV on prison drama Screw, which broadcast on Channel 4 in January 2022. Williams was the showrunner of Suspicion, which streamed on Apple TV+ on 4 February 2022. It is based on the Israeli series False Flag.

In 2026, he created, wrote and executive produced three-part true crime miniseries The Witness, which was premiered on Netflix. It is based on a memoir Letting Go by Alex Hanscombe, whose mother Rachel Nickell was murdered on 15 July 1992.
