= Frederick L. Rawson =

English footballer and religious figure

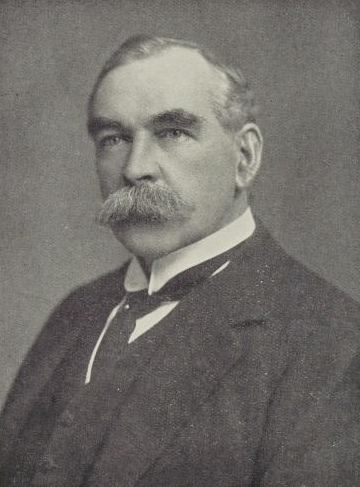

Personal information
- Full name: Frederick Lawrence Rawson
- Date of birth: 27 July 1859
- Place of birth: the High Seas
- Date of death: 10 November 1923 (aged 64)
- Place of death: New York City
- Position: Winger

Youth career
- 1874–1876: Westminster School

Senior career*
Years	Team	Apps	(Gls)
1875–1880	Clapham Rovers		
1876–1877	Runnymede		
- * Club domestic league appearances and goals

Frederick Lawrence Rawson (27 July 1859 – 10 November 1923) was an English engineer, spiritual healer and footballer who played in the 1879 FA Cup final. He was influential in the New Thought movement and was the founder of the Society for Spreading the Knowledge of True Prayer.

== Early life ==
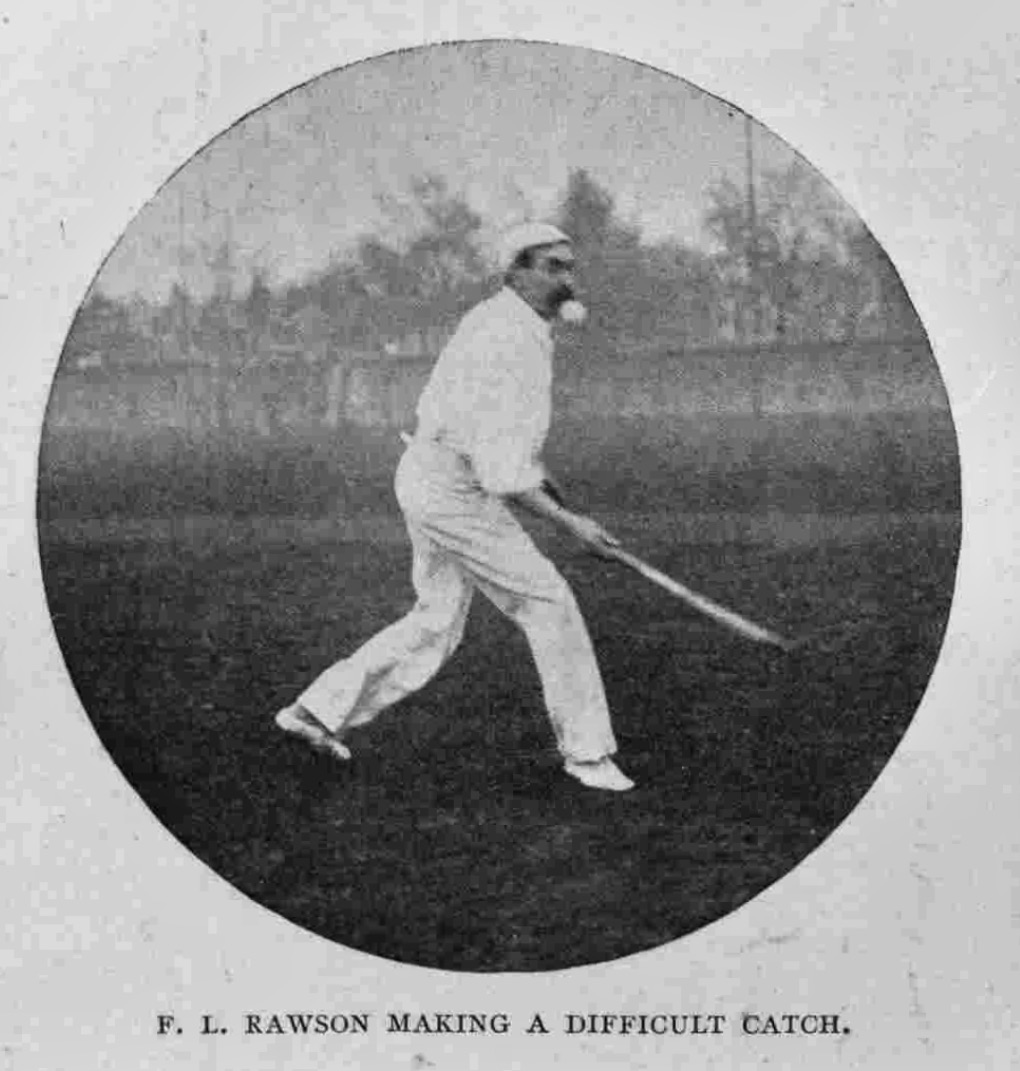
Frederick Rawson playing vigoro for Surrey, Illustrated London News, 8 November 1902

Rawson was the son of government official Sir Rawson Rawson, and was born at sea, near the Cape of Good Hope, in 1859. Two of his brothers, William and Herbert, played in the 1874 FA Cup final, on opposing sides.

He attended Westminster School, which played a dribbling code of football akin to association. He represented the school XI in association matches in 1874–75 and 1875–76; he scored in a 5–0 hammering of Upton Park in October 1875, and in a creditable 3–2 defeat to the Wanderers the following month.

== Sporting career ==
While still at school, Rawson became a member of the Clapham Rovers football club, although his first match as a member was against the Rovers - the Barnes club turned up for a friendly in October 1875 short-handed, and Rawson was one of two Rovers members who played for the visitors as substitutes. His chief position was as a right-winger, and was described as "a useful wing player" who "middles well".

His first competitive match for the Rovers was in the first round of the 1876–77 FA Cup, in which Rovers beat Reigate Priory 5–0 at home. That appearance was a one-off, Rawson also playing for the Runnymede club that season, but he was a more regular player in 1877–78, and scored his first Cup goal in a 3–2 defeat to Oxford University at the third round stage at the Kennington Oval that season with a left-footed strike.

He only played twice in the 1878–79 FA Cup, in the 8–1 demolition of Swifts (helped by Ernest Bambridge of Swifts being carried off early in the game), at the final 6 stage, and in the final, against the Old Etonians. Despite his "play[ing] up vigorously" the Light Blues won 1–0.

The final was Rawson's final Cup tie; his final recorded match was as centre-forward for Rovers against Upton Park in a tune-up match for the 1880 FA Cup final as regular player Felix Barry was unavailable.

His sporting attentions turned to lawn tennis, and he entered the Wimbledon tennis championships in the 1880s. He only won one singles match, in the second round in 1888, after his opponent retired hurt (albeit Rawson was 2 sets to love up at the time); he lost in the quarter-final to William Taylor. His greatest success was winning the London Athletic Club tournament in 1881; his opponent in the final, G.S. Murray-Hill, was a quarter-finalist at Wimbledon that year.

He also represented Surrey in the new sport of vigoro in 1902.

== Engineering career ==
Rawson was trained in engineering in Birkenhead, and developed a number of electronic devices, including those in relation to floodlighting sporting fields, electric omnibuses, and small lights to assist with medical operations. He also acted as helmsman on the first airship test for the War Office.

In 1881 he started the firm of Woodhouse and Rawson (electric light contractors) with occasional tennis partner Otway Woodhouse.

In 1905, he started a company with the aim of extracting gold from seawater; he attributed the failure of the project to a Japanese earthquake.

== Prayer ==
On his retirement from business, Rawson claimed to have developed a prayer technique, set out in a book, Life Understood from a Scientific & Religious Point of View and the Practical Method of Destroying Sin, Disease & Death, published in 1912. He claimed his techniques saved the lives of thousands of soldiers in the First World War by "dematerializing bullets" amidst other miracles.

In 1916, he opened a "prayer shop" on Regent Street where he offered his services to pray for sick people for a fee. He claimed he could allay the suffering of wounded prisoners in Germany. He employed staff including clerks and typists. His shop received thousands of letters every week until it closed in January 1917 after being raided by the police and all his documents were removed to Scotland Yard.

He prophesied the end of the world for 3 December 1917 (in a pamphlet he sold for 2 shillings), and, despite the failure of this particular prediction, founded the Society for Spreading the Knowledge of True Prayer in 1918; he earned £1,000 per time for advising soldiers on how to save their lives through prayer.

In 1922, Rawson moved his prayer business to Paris but returned after a few months to Portland Place in London. In 1923, it was reported that the Society for Spreading the Knowledge of True Prayer maintained offices in seventeen cities in the United States.

== Personal life ==
Rawson lived in Epsom in Surrey. He married Evelyn Trevelyan Cazalet in St Mary Abbott's in Kensington on 18 February 1890, and the couple had two sons, Ronald and Wyatt. He died of pneumonia in the Hotel Astor on 10 November 1923 in New York, when on an American tour.

== Selected publications ==
- How to Protect Our Soldiers: The Practical Utilisation of the Power of God by Right Thinking (PDF). London: The Crystal Press. 1916.
- Life Understood: From A Scientific And Religious Point Of View And The Practical Method Of Destroying Sin Disease And Death. London: The Society For Spreading The Knowledge Of True Prayer. 1947.
