= The Witness (2026 TV series) =

British television series

- Release poster
- Genre: True crime
- Created by: Rob Williams
- Based on: Letting Go by Alex Hanscombe
- Written by: Rob Williams
- Directed by: Alex Winckler
- Starring: Jordan Bolger; Jahsaiah Williams; Max Fincham; Kerry Godliman
- Music by: Oliver Coates
- Original language: English
- No. of episodes: 3

Production
- Executive producers: Rob Williams; Sarah Brown; John Yorke
- Producer: Alison Sterling
- Cinematography: Michael Filocamo
- Editor: Steven Worsley
- Running time: 47–57 minutes
- Production company: STV Studios

Original release
- Network: Netflix
- Release: 4 June 2026

The Witness is a television true crime miniseries retelling of the 1992 killing of Rachel Nickell and the aftermath for her husband and son. The series is based on a memoir Letting Go by Alex Hanscombe. It premiered on Netflix on 4 June 2026 and received positive reviews from critics.

== Cast ==
=== Main ===
- Jordan Bolger as André Hanscombe

=== Supporting ===
- Max Fincham as Alex Hanscombe
  - Jahsaiah Williams as Young Alex
- Kerry Godliman as Grandma June
- Eleanor Williams as Rachel Nickell
- Neil Maskell as DI Keith Pedder
- Kevin Eldon as DCI Mick Wickerson
- Mark Stanley as DS Ivan Agnew
- Jon Pointing as DC Nick Sparshatt
- James Dryden as DC Paul Miller
- James Bradshaw as DCI Tony Nash
- Claire Rushbrook as Dr Jean Harris-Hendriks
- Paul Chahidi as Professor Paul Britton
- Oliver Devoti as Detective Jackaman
- Tom Ashley as Philip Tandy
- Sean Gilder as DCS Nicholas Campbell
- Matt Green as Dr. Richard Shephard
- Tony Aitken as Michael Murray
- Adam Howden as DC Grant Johnson
- Jamie Bisping as Colin Stagg
- Katharine Pearson as Samantha Bisset
- Holly Hawgood as Lizzie James
- Hunter Moore as Jazmine Bisset
- Ben Cartwright as DS Micky Banks
- Steve Stamp as Robert Napper
- Jack Shalloo as DI John Pearse

== Production ==
The series is written and created by Rob Williams and produced by STV Studios. The director is Alex Winckler, with Alison Sterling as producer. Rob Williams is also an executive producer alongside Sarah Brown and John Yorke. It was announced by Netflix in December 2024.

It has a cast led by Jordan Bolger as the widower Andre with Jahsaiah Williams and Max Fincham as Alex, the child witness to his mother's murder. Alex and André Hanscombe acted as consultants on the series. The cast also includes Neil Maskell, Kevin Eldon, Jon Pointing, Kerry Godliman, Paul Chahidi, Claire Rushbrook and Mark Stanley.

== Episodes ==
No.	Title	Directed by	Written by	Original release date
1	"Episode 1"	Alex Winckler	Rob Williams	4 June 2026
2	"Episode 2"	Alex Winckler	Rob Williams	4 June 2026
3	"Episode 3"	Alex Winckler	Rob Williams	4 June 2026

== Release ==
The series was released on Netflix on 4 June 2026.

== Reception ==
The review aggregator website Rotten Tomatoes reported a 100% approval rating, based on 13 critic reviews with an average rating of 7.3/10. Metacritic, which uses a weighted average, assigned the series a score of 72 out of 100, based on five critics, indicating "generally favorable" reviews.
