= Thomas Marshall (footballer, born 1858) =

English footballer

Personal information
- Full name: Thomas Marshall
- Date of birth: 12 September 1858
- Place of birth: Withnell, England
- Date of death: 29 April 1917 (aged 58)
- Place of death: Blackburn, England
- Position: Outside right

Senior career*
Years	Team	Apps	(Gls)
1878–1886	Darwen		
1886	Blackburn Olympic		

International career
1880–1881	England	2	(0)
- * Club domestic league appearances and goals

Thomas Marshall (12 September 1858 – 29 April 1917) was an English professional footballer who played as an outside-right for Darwen in the 1870s and 1880s and made two appearances for England, both against Wales.

== Football career ==
Marshall was born in the village of Withnell, approximately midway between Chorley, Blackburn and Darwen. After playing junior football in Lancashire, he joined Darwen in 1878. Described as "a speedy winger with an accurate passing ability", he was selected for the second international match against Wales, played at Wrexham's Racecourse Ground on 15 March 1880. The match ended in a 3–2 victory for the English, with two goals from Francis Sparks and the other from Marshall's Darwen teammate, Thomas Brindle (although some sources credit this as an own goal by the Welsh goalkeeper, Harry Hibbott).

Marshall retained his place for the next international, a return against Wales, played at Alexandra Meadows, Blackburn on 26 February 1881, where he lined up alongside another Darwen player, Thurston Rostron. With a "lucky" goal from Jack Vaughan, Wales secured their first victory over England at the third attempt.

Marshall remained at Darwen until 1886, before retiring after a very short spell with Blackburn Olympic, where he was re-united with his former Darwen and England colleague, Thomas Brindle.

== Career outside football ==
By trade, Marshall worked in a cotton mill. In the 1881 census, Marshall was listed as a cotton loomer, living in Duckworth Street, Darwen. He died on 29 April 1917, aged 58.

== Screen portrayal ==
In the character name Tommy Marshall, Marshall is portrayed by Gerard Kearns in the Netflix television miniseries, The English Game (2020).
