= 1879 FA Cup final =

- Event: 1878–79 FA Cup
Old Etonians	Clapham Rovers
1	0
- Date: 29 March 1879
- Venue: Kennington Oval, London

The 1879 FA Cup final was contested by Old Etonians and Clapham Rovers at the Kennington Oval in London. Old Etonians won by 1–0, the only goal scored by Charles Clerke.

== Summary ==
Although Clapham dominated the early stages of the final, with Norman Bailey having two attempts on target, Herbert Whitfeld continued to run at the Clapham defenders with little assistance from his colleagues. After a goalless first-half, the only goal of the game came after 59 minutes, when Charles Clerke scored from close range following a run from Harry Goodhart. The old Etonians thus claimed the cup for the first time in what was considered to be "the poorest FA Cup Final to date".

== Match details ==
29 March 1879

Old Etonians	1–0	Clapham Rovers
Clerke 59'

Kennington Oval, London

Old Etonians	C. Rovers

Old Etonians:
GK	(England) John Purvis Hawtrey
DF	(England) Edward Christian
DF	(England) Lindsay Bury
MF	(Scotland) Hon. Arthur Kinnaird (C)
MF	(England) Edgar Lubbock
FW	(England) Charles Clerke
FW	(England) Norman Pares
FW	(England) Harry Goodhart
FW	(England) Herbert Whitfeld
FW	(England) John Chevallier
FW	(England) Mark Beaufoy

Clapham Rovers:
GK	(England) Reginald Birkett
DF	(England) Robert Ogilvie
DF	(England) Edgar Field
MF	(England) Norman Bailey
MF	(England) James Prinsep
FW	(England) Frederick Rawson
FW	(England) Arthur J. Stanley
FW	(England) Stanley Scott
FW	(England) Herbert Bevington
FW	(England) Edward Growse
FW	(England) Cecil Keith-Falconer
