= Malcolm Sutherland =

English footballer

Personal information
- Position: Inside forward

Senior career*
Years	Team	Apps	(Gls)
1892–1894	Darwen	51	(19)
1894–1895	Burnley	1	(0)
Total		52	(19)
- * Club domestic league appearances and goals

Malcolm Sutherland was an English professional footballer who played as an inside forward.
