= Suspicion (2022 TV series) =

2022 thriller television series

- Promotional poster
- Genre: Drama; Espionage; Mystery thriller
- Created by: Rob Williams
- Based on: False Flag by Maria Feldman & Amit Cohen
- Directed by: Chris Long
- Starring: Kunal Nayyar; Georgina Campbell; Elyes Gabel; Elizabeth Henstridge; Angel Coulby; Lydia West; Clare Perkins; Noah Emmerich; Uma Thurman; Tom Rhys Harries; Robert Glenister; Jennifer Ehle; Gerran Howell; Karl Johnson
- Composer: Gilad Benamram
- Country of origin: United Kingdom
- Original language: English
- No. of seasons: 1
- No. of episodes: 8

Production
- Executive producers: Rob Williams; Chris Long; Howard Burch; Avi Nir; Anna Winger; Liat Benasuly
- Running time: 44–50 minutes
- Production company: Keshet UK

Original release
- Network: Apple TV+
- Release: 4 February – 18 March 2022

Suspicion is a British thriller television series based on the Israeli series False Flag. Set in London and New York City, the series premiered on Apple TV+ on 4 February 2022. It received generally mixed reviews from critics. The series was cancelled after one season.

== Premise ==
Five people – three men and two women – have their lives turned upside down after being identified by London police as suspects in the kidnapping and subsequent disappearance of American media mogul Katherine Newman's son Leonardo.

== Cast ==
=== Main ===
- Kunal Nayyar as Aadesh Chopra, a cybersecurity technician
- Georgina Campbell as Natalie Thompson, a tax consultancy finance manager
- Elyes Gabel as Sean Tilson, a mysterious ex-military operative
- Elizabeth Henstridge as Tara McAllister, a psychology research fellow at Oxford University
- Angel Coulby as Vanessa Okoye, a senior NCA investigator and former RMP officer
- Tom Rhys Harries as Eddie Walker, a wealthy history student at Oxford University
- Robert Glenister as Martin Copeland, the COO of Cooper-Newman Public Relations
- Lydia West as Monique Thompson, an NYU student and Natalie’s younger sister
- Clare Perkins as Lydia Thompson, Natalie and Monique's mother
- Gerran Howell as Leonardo 'Leo' Newman, an Oxford University student and Katherine’s son
- Karl Johnson as Eric Cresswell, a former professor of mathematics and climate modelling at Cambrook University
- Jennifer Ehle as Amy, the CEO of International Oil and Petroleum Energy
- Noah Emmerich as Scott Anderson, an FBI Violent Crimes and Major Offenders (VCMO) special agent assisting the NCA
- Uma Thurman as Katherine Newman, the CEO of Cooper-Newman Public Relations and nominee for Ambassador to the United Kingdom

=== Supporting ===
- Ross McCall as Owen Neilssen, an FBI supervisory special agent and Anderson’s boss
- Mandip Gill as Sonia Chopra, a teaching assistant and Aadesh’s wife
- Parth Thakerar as Shiv Kapoor, Sonia’s brother
- Faraz Ayub as Ajay Kapoor, Sonia’s brother
- Kulvinder Ghir as Rakesh Kapoor, Sonia’s father
- Ben Bailey Smith as Joe Gibson, a lawyer and Natalie’s fiance
- Martin Savage as Reuben Carson, Okyoe’s superior at the NCA
- Ian McElhinney as Sean’s Northern Irish grandfather
- Dominic Tighe as Steve McAllister, Tara's estranged husband
- Bijan Daneshmand as Masoud Ghorbani, a counterfeiter

== Episodes ==
No.	Title	Directed by	Written by	Original release date
1	"Persons of Interest"	Chris Long	Rob Williams	February 4, 2022
Leo Newman, son of communications mogul and ambassadorial nominee Katherine Newman, is kidnapped from the Park Madison Hotel in Midtown Manhattan by perpetrators wearing masks of the British Royal family. CCTV footage of the kidnapping is uploaded and goes viral online. FBI special agent Scott Anderson is assigned as the lead investigator, and meets with Newman. The NYPD flags four British citizens who were in New York at the time as suspects. Three of them, bride-to-be and finance manager Natalie Thompson, dissatisfied IT technician Aadesh Chopra and Oxford University lecturer Tara McAllister, are arrested back in the United Kingdom and placed in the custody of National Crime Agency senior investigator Vanessa Okoye. Sean Tilson, a man carrying several passports, disguises himself and escapes being arrested by the PSNI after landing in Belfast from New York.
2	"Room for Doubt"	Chris Long	Rob Williams	February 4, 2022
The three suspects stayed at the Park Madison Hotel the same time as Sean. Natalie for a hen night with her NYU student sister Monique, Aadesh to be interviewed by Cooper-Newman, and Tara begrudgingly at Cooper-Newman’s charity conference on behalf of Oxford to thank them for funding. All three deny involvement, or knowledge of Sean Tilson when questioned. Monique hides a large sum of cash and takes a burner phone she finds in Natalie’s bag. Okoye mentions Tara’s past questioning of Newman funding and Leo being admitted to Oxford. Anderson joins Oykoe and accuses Aadesh of hacking hotel CCTV, Natalie of funding the kidnapping and Tara of organising. Sean retrieves money and a handgun from his grandfather's house in Bangor, clandestinely sails to Merseyside and steals a car, killing two people in the process. Without enough evidence to charge, Okoye releases the three under close surveillance. A ransom video of Leo is broadcast to the Senate Judiciary Committee, demanding Newman “tell the truth” or he will be killed.
3	"Strangers"	Stefan Schwartz	Terry Cafolla	February 11, 2022
Sean’s involvement in the kidnapping is released to the press by the FBI. He arrives in London, revealed to have been texting Natalie’s burner. Confronted by Monique, Natalie confesses she embezzled over £400k from Nemus Group, a client who demanded she pay back double, with New York being the final cash drop. Monique is extracted by NCA officers before she can return the money to Sean directly. Natalie is re-arrested after she transfers funds to a Cayman Islands account. Anderson tells her Cooper-Newman are majority shareholders in Nemus. Aadesh is confronted by conspiracy theorists at work and becomes alienated from his wife and in-laws, and Tara is suspended from work. Okoye has Natalie agree to meet Sean the following day to exchange the money, and Natalie declines legal representation from her solicitor fiancé. Eddie Walker, an Oxford student, is identified as a fifth suspect, having drunk near the Park Madison Hotel bar mere hours before the kidnapping.
4	"The Devil You Know"	Stefan Schwartz	Megan Gallagher	February 18, 2022
Eddie is also released under surveillance after denying involvement or knowing Leo. He finds Aadesh after seeing the conspiracy videos online, and suggests they locate Natalie and Tara to go public together and proclaim their innocence. At the meeting Sean tries to kill Natalie and escapes capture by NCA firearms officers. He is stabbed while meeting a contact, Brolin, for new identity documents, who he kills. Anderson reports the failure to Newman, who decides to address the kidnappers in a public broadcast. She confesses the fundraising that secured her ambassadorial nomination failed to disclose money came from a source under economic sanctions. The kidnappers intercept the press conference screens, saying she still has not told the truth and demand she reveal what Eric Cresswell, a disgraced former scientist, knows. Natalie is released on bail. Tara, Natalie, Monique, Aadesh and Eddie are kidnapped by an armed rendition team, who take them to an airstrip demanding Leo’s whereabouts. They are rescued by Sean, but Monique is killed in the gunfight.
5	"What Does a Kidnapper Look Like?"	Stefan Schwartz	Nick Leather	February 25, 2022
Sean drives the group to a property Brolin was assigned to visit. He tells them he isn’t involved with Leo's kidnap, that they’re each other's best chance of discovering who is framing them. Sean tells Natalie he was simply hired as a collector for Nemus, unaware of their Cooper-Newman links. Tara confesses she started an anonymous campaign against Leo Newman, stopping after her daughter was briefly kidnapped as a warning. Aadesh accesses Brolin’s laptop and discovers emails with Martin Copeland, the COO of Cooper-Newman. Aadesh confesses he hacked the company to offer his services as a consultant, and found a secret email server. All appearances seem Copeland is behind the kidnap and implicated the group, possibly as revenge for Newman naming Leo not him as her successor. Sean plans to confront Copeland in New York. He allows the others to accompany him when Natalie offers the remaining money in her offshore account to finance the trip. Eddie messages someone via a secret phone.
6	"Be the Gray Man"	Chris Long	Terry Cafolla	March 4, 2022
The kidnappers hack every Cooper-Newman client, mounting worldwide pressure and an online campaign for her to tell the truth. Newman meets with longtime client and International Oil and Petroleum (IOP) Energy CEO Amy, where the two discuss how Cresswell’s knowledge can never become public. Monique’s body is found by Okoye and Anderson, with the scene professionally scrubbed. The group travels to London to change their appearances and obtain fake passports from Sean’s contact Masoud. He becomes suspicious when Eddie speaks Farsi, and convinces Tara to make the trip as an example to her daughter. Okoye reveals to Anderson that Eddie is actually an undercover NCA officer named Liam McKenna. Aadesh is identified on CCTV at Stansted Airport. Deducing they will all be travelling, the FBI reluctantly allows the group to enter the US so they can be further tracked. After arriving in New York City, Sean secretly meets with Copeland alone, and confirms things are all set.
7	"Questions of Trust"	Chris Long	Nick Leather	March 11, 2022
Cresswell approaches the police in Gloucestershire, saying someone is trying to kill him. Aadesh overhears Eddie reporting to the NCA, but he lies and tells him he works for Newman. Owen Neilssen, Anderson’s boss, questions Newman about Copeland’s links with the UK suspects. At a Brooklyn warehouse, Sean demands Aadesh contact Copeland via the same secret server to meet them. He kills two assassins sent by Copeland, following their meeting the previous evening. After using their phone to tell Copeland that everyone including him is dead, he offers to take the group to Copeland so they can finally get answers. Sean pays someone to drive his van to the FBI New York Field Office as a distraction, allowing them to travel to the Park Madison Hotel undetected. Newman arranges a televised interview, which reveals that Cooper-Newman helped IOP bury an accurate climate change report commissioned by Cresswell in 1995. The group kidnaps Copeland at the hotel, where he admits sending the rendition team to kill them as potential threats to the company. Sean demands his money. Before Copeland reveals the truth about Leo’s kidnapping, Natalie shoots him dead as revenge for Monique.
8	"Unmasked"	Chris Long	Megan Gallagher	March 18, 2022
Sean flees the hotel separate from the group. The kidnappers, still unsatisfied, broadcast footage of Leo with a countdown in Times Square. The group are confronted by Leo and his friends at gunpoint, who orchestrated the kidnapping and #TellTheTruth campaign with Tara, who is revealed to be Cresswell’s daughter Evie. They all wanted his mother to confess her actions in the coverup, and frame Natalie, Aadesh and Sean, who the public already believe are guilty. Eddie draws a pistol and disarms Leo, shooting his computer which cuts the Times Square feed. Sean returns and injures Eddie, then takes Leo. Newman further confesses and apologises on livestream how Cooper-Newman orchestrated a disinformation campaign to discredit Cresswell and protect their clients interests, contributing significantly to modern climate change denial and fake news culture. Leo is “found” in a nearby basement by the police after Newman pays Sean $1 million, which he plans to use for a new identity given his professional reputation is ruined. He warns her if she double crosses him he will kill Leo for good. Natalie is arrested for killing Copeland, but Tara and Aadesh escape. Reunited with Leo, Newman indicates she knows he arranged the kidnapping.

== Production ==
=== Development ===
In July 2019, Apple TV+ announced the development of an English-language version of award-winning Israeli thriller False Flag, created by Maria Feldman and Amit Cohen, with Keshet International, the distribution and production arm of Keshet Media Group, the same company behind the original Hebrew-language series. In March 2020, Apple ordered an eight-part series to be produced by Keshet's British production arm, Keshet UK, and directed by Chris Long, with Rob Williams serving as showrunner. Both also executive produced along with Howard Burch, Avi Nir, Anna Winger, Maria Feldman, Amit Cohen and Liat Benasuly. The show was cancelled by Apple TV+ in July 2023.

=== Casting ===
Along with the series order in March 2020, Uma Thurman was cast to star in Suspicion, with Kunal Nayyar, Noah Emmerich, Georgina Campbell, Elyes Gabel, Elizabeth Henstridge, and Angel Coulby also joining the cast. In November 2020, it was reported that Tom Rhys Harries had joined the cast.

=== Filming ===
As of March 2020, production had reportedly begun in the United Kingdom on Suspicion, but had to be suspended due the COVID-19 pandemic. In September 2020, Apple was reportedly preparing to restart filming in England, with filming confirmed to have started in November 2020 in Brixham. Filming also occurred in New York City in May 2021, with several cast members being seen on set in Central Park, Washington Square Park, and the Upper East Side. Season one concluded filming on May 18, 2021.

=== Release ===
The eight-part series premiered with two episodes being released on Apple TV+ on Friday, 4 February 2022, with the remaining six episodes airing every Friday thereafter. In 2025, the series was re-released on ITVX in the UK.

== Reception ==
On the review aggregator website Rotten Tomatoes, 48% of 29 critics' reviews are positive, with an average rating of 6.20/10. The website's consensus reads: "While this espionage thriller achieves a genuine atmosphere of paranoia, it is dogged by the Suspicion that star Uma Thurman is being wasted on a shallow mystery."

The Hollywood Reporter's Angie Han writes, "Suspicion is broadly competent, in that the dialogue is serviceable, the performances unobjectionable (though those watching for Thurman should be warned she’s barely in it at all), the narrative easy enough to follow." Barbara Ellen of The Observer said the drama was "undone by erratic drama and nonsensical themes". The Wall Street Journal's Dorothy Rabinowitz was more complimentary, dubbing it "ambitious".
