= Chasing Shadows (TV series) =

2014 British TV series

- Genre: Crime thriller
- Created by: Rob Williams
- Written by: Rob Williams
- Directed by: Christopher Menaul; Jim O'Hanlon
- Starring: Reece Shearsmith; Alex Kingston; Noel Clarke; Don Warrington; Adjoa Andoh
- Theme music composer: Samuel Sim
- Composer: Samuel Sim
- Country of origin: United Kingdom
- Original language: English
- No. of series: 1
- No. of episodes: 4

Production
- Executive producer: Francis Hopkinson
- Producer: Rob Bullock
- Cinematography: Tony Slater-Ling
- Running time: 45 minutes (w/out advertisements)
- Production company: ITV Studios

Original release
- Network: ITV
- Release: 4 September – 25 September 2014

Chasing Shadows is a British crime drama produced by ITV, first aired on 4 September 2014. The series follows the work of a missing persons unit, and stars Reece Shearsmith as protagonist Sean Stone, a detective sergeant, and Alex Kingston, as advisor Ruth Hattersley. The series of four episodes concluded on 25 September 2014. On 7 April 2016, the series was made available to view on the ITV Hub.

== Plot ==
DS Sean Stone is intense and socially awkward, a misfit who is happier dealing with data rather than people. His lack of people skills and forthright honesty make him some powerful enemies in the force, and he finds himself exiled to the Missing Persons Bureau. Sean's new caseload is overwhelming - up to 300,000 people go missing in the UK each year - but his brilliant mind turns out to be perfectly adapted to his new role. Where others see a hopeless, ever-growing sea of lost faces, Sean spots patterns that lead to victims... and their killers. Ruth Hattersley is the analyst from the Missing Persons Bureau tasked with working alongside Sean. She puts people first - a born connector able to get on with anyone, but Sean pushes even her patience to breaking point. DCI Pryor has ambitions and a clear plan for rising up the ranks, but all this is jeopardised when DS Stone becomes his responsibility.

== Cast ==
- Reece Shearsmith as DS Sean Stone, a detective sergeant with undiagnosed autism assigned to the Missing Persons Bureau
- Alex Kingston as Ruth Hattersley, a data analyst for the Bureau
- Noel Clarke as DCI Carl Prior, Stone's superior officer
- Don Warrington as Chief Supt. Harley Drayton, the commander of the Missing Persons Bureau
- Adjoa Andoh as Angela Bale, one of Ruth's colleagues
- Alfie Field as Bryan Hattersley, Ruth's son
- Lynda Baron as Maggie Hattersley, Ruth's mother
- Doug Allen as DI Gary Scanlon, Pryor's second-in-command
- Myriam Acharki as Adele Rivera, Stone's housekeeper

== Episodes ==
No.	Title	Directed by	Written by	Original release date	UK viewers (millions)
1	"Only Connect: Part One"	Christopher Menaul	Rob Williams	4 September 2014	3.85
After criticising police procedure in the aftermath of a murderer's capture, awkward and unorthodox DS Sean Stone is permanently seconded to the Missing Persons Bureau with analyst Ruth Hattersley. The case of a vanished 16-year-old girl soon has him back out in the field, and looking into a spate of teen suicides after discovering the teen had links to a suicide forum, he believes he has discovered a serial killer preying on vulnerable youngsters.
2	"Only Connect: Part Two"	Christopher Menaul	Rob Williams	11 September 2014	3.20
After criticising police procedure in the aftermath of a murderer's capture, awkward and unorthodox DS Sean Stone is permanently seconded to the Missing Persons Bureau with analyst Ruth Hattersley. The case of a vanished 16-year-old girl soon has him back out in the field, and looking into a spate of teen suicides after discovering the teen had links to a suicide forum, he believes he has discovered a serial killer preying on vulnerable youngsters.
3	"Off Radar: Part One"	Jim O'Hanlon	Rob Williams	18 September 2014	3.18
DS Stone looks into the case of Stephen Eli, a lawyer and single father who fits none of the five most common categories of missing persons. Serial killer Leonard Vance, incarcerated in a psychiatric hospital, is a new suspect when Sean spots a connection with the killer's two victims. Vance later confesses, but fails to guide police to Eli's body and later dies from cardiac arrest. Sean starts to believe that somebody else is responsible for not only Eli's death, but also the other murders supposedly committed by Vance, and finds a pattern with all supposed three victims.
4	"Off Radar: Part Two"	Jim O'Hanlon	Rob Williams	25 September 2014	3.26
DS Stone looks into the case of Stephen Eli, a lawyer and single father who fits none of the five most common categories of missing persons. Serial killer Leonard Vance, incarcerated in a psychiatric hospital, is a new suspect when Sean spots a connection with the killer's two victims. Vance later confesses, but fails to guide police to Eli's body and later dies from cardiac arrest. Sean starts to believe that somebody else is responsible for not only Eli's death, but also the other murders supposedly committed by Vance, and finds a pattern with all supposed three victims.
