= Alan Stewart (cinematographer) =

Scottish cinematographer

Alan Stewart (born 1960) is a Scottish cinematographer.

== Life and career ==
Born in Comrie, Perth and Kinross, Stewart first served as a tea boy for the camera crew of various productions before gaining work as a clapper loader, focus puller, and eventually a camera operator, working under the likes of Ellen Kuras and Seamus McGarvey.

Stewart relocated to England in the mid-1990s, and in 1998, alongside Peter Middleton, was nominated for a BAFTA television award for his work on the BBC limited series Holding On.

He would work in the camera department on film and television projects like Band of Brothers, Into the Woods, Ready Player One and Mary Poppins Returns.

Stewart began working with director Guy Ritchie in the camera department for movies like Sherlock Holmes, A Game of Shadows and King Arthur: Legend of the Sword, before making his big break as director of photography on Disney's Aladdin.

== Filmography ==
=== Feature film ===
Year	Title	Director	Notes
2019	Aladdin	Guy Ritchie	
2019	The Gentlemen	Guy Ritchie	
2021	Tom & Jerry	Tim Story	
2021	Wrath of Man	Guy Ritchie	
2023	Operation Fortune: Ruse de Guerre	Guy Ritchie	
2024	The Union	Julian Farino	

=== Television ===
Year	Title	Notes
2004	Murder City	1 episode
2005	The Rotters' Club	Miniseries
2005	The Quatermass Experiment	Television film
