= Edward Growse =

English footballer

Personal information
- Full name: Edward Frederic Growse
- Date of birth: 8 July 1860
- Place of birth: Brentwood, Essex
- Date of death: 10 November 1905 (aged 45)
- Place of death: Red Sea
- Position: Utility player

Youth career
- 1873–1878: Charterhouse School

Senior career*
| Years | Team | Apps | (Gls) |
| 1877–1880 | Clapham Rovers | | |
| 1877–1881 | Brentwood | | |
| 1879–1881 | Old Carthusians | | |
- * Club domestic league appearances and goals

Edward Frederic Growse (8 July 1860 - 10 November 1905) was a footballer and civil servant who played in the 1879 FA Cup final.

== Early life ==
Growse was born in Brentwood, Essex, the son of a doctor, and went up to Charterhouse School in 1872. He was a significant success on the sporting field. He played in the cricket XI every year from 1875 to 1878, being captain for the last two seasons, and won the Athletic Challenge Cup in 1878. Charterhouse was also an early powerhouse in football, and Growse played for the school's football XI in from 1874 to 1878, again taking the captaincy in the last year.

He went up to Balliol College, Oxford in 1878, and collected a Blue in athletics, being runner-up in the inter-varsity 440 yards in 1880 and 1881 - in the latter year it required a world record from Reginald Macaulay to beat him.

== Football career ==
Curiously, he never represented the Oxford University A.F.C. in competitive football, but did act as umpire for the O.U.A.F.C. on occasion. Before he went up to Oxford, he had played against the university in the 1877–78 FA Cup as full-back for the Clapham Rovers - he had previously played against the Rovers for Charterhouse School and the Cup tie was his début in the Cup.

He also played for the new Brentwood side as half-back in the 1877–78 season, two of his brothers also being regulars for Brentwood; Growse occasionally played for Brentwood until early 1881.

He scored his first goal in the second round of the 1878–79 FA Cup, in a 10–1 rout of Forest School, by which time he had moved to centre-forward. More crucially he scored the only goal of the quarter-final tie against Cambridge University, in extra-time, by allowing an Arthur Stanley cross-shot to bounce off his knee under the tape. He remained one of the two centre-forwards for the rest of the competition, but was on the losing side in the final, the Rovers losing to the Old Etonians; Growse was considered the only Rovers forward "up to the mark".

For the 1879–80 season, he pledged his loyalty to the new Old Carthusians club, but the luck of the draw was against them, and the O.C.s lost against the Wanderers at their favoured Kennington Oval in the second round. It was unfortunate timing for Growse as Clapham Rovers won the competition for the only time. He did at least have the consolation of earning representative honours for the London Football Association, scoring in the London FA's defeat at the Birmingham Football Association in 1880.

The Carthusians went on to win the competition in 1880–81, but Growse again missed out on a winner's medal. His last game came in the 2–0 win at the Royal Engineers in the fourth round, playing on the left side of the forward line. He was not included against his former Clapham Rovers team-mates in the quarter-final and never regained his place. This was probably due to clashes with athletic competition - the semi-final was two days after the University of Oxford annual athletics competition, in which Growse came joint second in the quarter-mile, and the Cup final was two days after the Varsity athletics.

There were evidently no hard feelings, as his final appearance at a football match was as the Carthusians' nominated umpire for a match against Notts County when on leave in February 1882.

== Cricket career ==
From 1877 to 1881, Growse played six matches for the Essex County Cricket Club, the first (as opening bat against the M.C.C.) when he was still at school. His highest score was 64, against Felsted School in 1880, and, although not a specialist bowler, he took two wickets against Tooting Wanderers Cricket Club in 1880. He did return to cricket during a decade later for a handful of matches for the Old Carthusians XI.

== Post-football and personal life ==
His football career ended abruptly as he was recruited into the Indian Civil Service and sent to Bengal in 1881. He worked most of his life in India, with a family home in Cheltenham, and married Emily Ouseley in 1883. The couple had one son, Hugh, who also went to Charterhouse and joined the South Wales Borderers in 1905.

He died in the Red Sea on 10 November 1905, while returning to England. He was survived by his widow and son.
