= Edward Christian (footballer) =

English footballer (1858–1934)

Personal information
- Date of birth: 14 September 1858
- Place of birth: Malvern, England
- Date of death: 3 April 1934 (aged 75)
- Position: Full back

Senior career*
Years	Team	Apps	(Gls)
- Old Etonians

International career
1879	England	1	(0)
- * Club domestic league appearances and goals

Edward Christian (14 September 1858 – 3 April 1934) was an English amateur footballer who earned one cap for the national team against Scotland in 1879. He played in the full back position.

He was on the winning side for Old Etonians against Clapham Rovers in the 1879 FA Cup Final at Kennington Oval.

== Early life and education ==
Christian was born at Malvern, Worcestershire and educated at Twyford School, near Winchester, Hampshire, Eton College, and Trinity College, Cambridge, where he graduated B.A. in 1881.

== Football and Other Sports ==
Christian was a full-back, praised by C.W. Alcock as "a fine back kicking well with either foot". He had played for Eton and Cambridge University (but never in Varsity matches which would have qualified him as a 'Blue'). In addition to the F.A. Cup competition of 1878–79, he played in the following season of 1879–80, only to find himself on the losing side against Clapham Rovers in the quarter final, again at the Oval. His playing career was short lived because of his early business career abroad.

He also played cricket and was a member of the M.C.C. While abroad he was a prominent member of the Colombo Jockey Club.

== Business career ==
Christian was based in Ceylon (now Sri Lanka) from 1881, returning permanently to England in 1904. He was a member of the firm of Messrs H.M. Robertson and Company of Colombo; a director of Pundaloga Tea Company of Colombo, and director of the Bengal and North Western Railway Company of India.

== Family and later life ==
Christian settled at Otterbourne House, in the village of Otterbourne where he was lord of the manor, near Winchester. He was a frequent prize-winner at local agricultural shows. He was still living at Otterbourne when he died at Wimpole Street, Marylebone, London, on 3 April 1934, aged seventy-five. He had made a considerable fortune in Ceylon and left an estate worth £240,665.
