= The Victim (2019 TV series) =

2019 miniseries

- Written by: Rob Williams
- Directed by: Niall McCormick
- Starring: Kelly Macdonald; James Harkness; John Hannah; Karla Crome; John Scougall; Isis Hainsworth; Andrew Rothney; Pooky Quesnel; Chloe Pirrie; Joanne Thomson; Ramon Tikaram; Cal MacAninch; Nicholas Nunn; Tom Mannion; Georgie Glen; Allison McKenzie
- Country of origin: Scotland
- Original languages: English, Scots
- No. of series: 1
- No. of episodes: 4

Production
- Production company: STV Studios

Original release
- Network: BBC One
- Release: 8 April – 11 April 2019

The Victim is a four-part Scottish thriller miniseries starring Kelly Macdonald, James Harkness, John Hannah and John Scougall. The series was produced by STV Studios and first broadcast on BBC One television in April 2019. The series was shot on location in Edinburgh, Glasgow, Port Glasgow and Largs.

== Plot ==
Bereaved mother Anna Dean, whose young son was murdered by an older boy 14 years prior, goes on trial for inciting murder after she is accused of posting online the new identity and address of the man she believes murdered her son: Craig Myers. Myers, a husband and father, was violently beaten and has had his reputation tarnished. The series revolves around the trial of the case, alongside its consequences for Myers' family and Dean's search to unmask the true identity of her son's killer.

== Cast ==
- Kelly Macdonald as Anna Dean
- James Harkness as Craig Myers
- John Hannah as DI Stephen Grover
- Karla Crome as Rebecca Myers
- John Scougall as Tom Carpenter
- Jamie Sives as Lenny Dean
- Isis Hainsworth as Louise Graham
- Andrew Rothney as Danny Callaghan
- Pooky Quesnel as Mo Buckley
- Chloe Pirrie as Ella Mackie
- Joanne Thomson as DS Lisa Harvey
- Ramon Tikaram as Solomon Mishra
- Cal MacAninch as Christian Graham
- Nicholas Nunn as William Napier
- Tom Mannion as Gerry Tythe
- Georgie Glen as Judge
- Allison McKenzie as Cathy
- Zahar Burlakov as Ben Dean

== Episodes ==
No.	Episode	Directed by	Written by	Original release date	UK viewers (millions)
1	Episode 1	Niall MacCormick	Rob Williams	8 April 2019	7.38
Fourteen years after her 9-year-old son Liam Graham was brutally murdered, Scottish nurse Anna Dean continues to feel hatred towards his then teenage killer, Eddie J. Turner. Craig Myers, a 28-year-old bus driver, is nearly beaten to death at his home in Inverclyde after an anonymous online post identifies him as Eddie J. Turner, the teenage murderer who killed Liam. The post included his photo, address and a message: "Don't let evil live." Anna is outraged that Turner never had to explain his crimes and spent just seven years in juvenile detention before being released with a new identity. She is accused of posting the comment and arrested for attempted murder for inciting violence against Myers. DI Stephen Grover, who was falsely accused of a crime himself, relates to Craig and feels responsible to see Anna face punishment for her actions.
2	Episode 2	Niall MacCormick	Rob Williams	9 April 2019	6.46
Craig recovers from his assault, but lingering suspicions remain about his identity, causing strain with his wife, Rebecca. He denies he is Turner, but is reluctant to reveal details of his past. He receives hate mail and a brick is thrown through their window. Suffering from PTSD from the attack, he persuades his boss to sack him from his job. In court, he does not reveal details about his childhood except to say he was neglected and in and out of care. The police tell Anna that Craig is not Turner, though they are also blocked from knowing Turner's new identity. She continues to pursue the case with her private investigator, Margaret "Mo" Buckley, who has contacts with former prison guards, despite the apprehension of her family, particularly her daughter, Louise, a law student. At trial in the Scottish capital of Edinburgh, Anna's attorney challenges Craig and his memory of the attack to cast doubt on whether the assailant was acting for another reason. Craig snaps at Anna when she asks for his identity to be proved.
3	Episode 3	Niall MacCormick	Rob Williams	10 April 2019	5.88
Anna gets her day in court, where she admits to being glad that Craig had been attacked because of her belief that he is Turner. Although Craig tries to persuade his wife and daughter to stay at home, after their daughter's teddy bear is burned and nailed to a fence, Rebecca decides to move out with their daughter. DI Grover suspects William, a troubled drug addict who is treated by Anna at the clinic, as the perpetrator in the attack against Craig. He interviews him without permission of the investigation. After the jury retires to begin deliberating their verdict, Anna is devastated when Liam's grave is defaced, with Turner's initials spray painted with yellow paint, and finds that the defacer was her other son, Ben, who feels neglected. Lenny, Anna's new husband, berates Anna that her anger and hate is leading her away from her family. Danny, Louise's boyfriend, acts oddly when introduced to Gerry Tythe, the detective in Liam's case. Gerry warns Louise that not only did Danny serve time in prison, he was the one who discovered Liam's body, and only reported it after several hours. Danny seeks out Ben and tell him he has to go. Anna meets with her ex-husband, Christian, an alcoholic who was just released from jail. She tells him, she lied on the stand and that she wants Turner dead, and that he meets frequently at a certain cafe with his social worker. Mo is startled to spot Tom Carpenter, Craig's loyal best friend, with the social worker.
4	Episode 4	Niall MacCormick	Rob Williams	11 April 2019	6.25
Mo informs Anna that Craig is not Turner and that they have ruined an innocent man's life, even refusing to reveal Tom as the person meeting the social worker. In court, the jury finds Anna guilty, but on a lesser charge of assault to danger life; she remains out on bail until sentencing. Louise confronts Danny and tells him to stay away from her family. DI Grover is suspended after William is admitted to hospital after a suicide attempt. William confesses to Anna that he attacked Craig. Anna meets with Craig to apologise. After a tearful Anna begs his forgiveness, Craig reveals he is in fact Eddie J. Turner. As she stumbles out in shock, Christian texts her that Turner is at the cafe. She is able to stop him before he can attack Tom with a knife. Grover goes to meet Craig to find out the result of the meeting and departs furiously with betrayal when he confesses to being Turner. Eddie then admits to Rebecca his real identity and that Tom was his cellmate; although he says he wants to renew his relationship with his wife and daughter with his identity known to them, she walks away, although a brief glance from her as he confirms his love for her leaves hope to the possibility that she might consider otherwise. Anna discovers that Eddie has left his phone number in her purse and decides to call him, seeking answers as to what happened to Liam, against her husband's advice. She meets him at the spot where he killed Liam, under a bridge. He confesses that back in 2003, he had been sitting at the spot self-harming when Liam walked by. Liam, who could see Eddie bleeding, told him that his mum was a nurse and could help him. Eddie asked Liam to leave him alone, but when he did not, he stabbed him fatally in a fit of rage. He apologises to Anna, telling her that he continues to live with crushing guilt as a result of his actions. Christian appears and intends to kill Eddie with a knife. As Eddie accepts his fate, Anna, feeling a slight pity for Eddie, suddenly stands between Christian and Eddie. As Christian stares dumbfounded, she says: "He wanted to be big", referring simultaneously to Liam, who said, "I want to be big" in an old video that Anna often watched. As Christian's expression softens with sadness, a tearful Anna stands defiant as a remorseful Eddie exhales. The end screen quote text... "Out beyond ideas of wrongdoing and rightdoing, there is a field. I'll meet you there." -- Rumi

== Production ==
In an interview with RadioTimes.com, screenwriter Rob Williams, who had previously volunteered to teach in prisons, said, “What has become really clear to me is that there is always a story behind every crime, from the seemingly trivial to the biggest crimes... We look for the black and the white, not least because the law demands black and white, it demands a goodie and a baddie and a villain and a hero. Life’s not like that, it seems to me and when you dig into the reasons behind crimes, all sorts of crimes, they’re always just far more nuanced and fascinating as a result of going beyond the surface”.

== Broadcast ==
The series was first broadcast on BBC One at 9pm from Monday to Thursday, 8 to 11 April 2019.

== Reception ==
The series has an 90% rating on Rotten Tomatoes. It was well received by critics, one of whom pointed to plot similarities with real life cases involving child murderers such as the murder of James Bulger.
