= Tom and Jerry (2021 American film) =

2021 film by Tim Story

- Release poster
- Directed by: Tim Story
- Written by: Kevin Costello
- Based on: Tom and Jerry by William Hanna; Joseph Barbera
- Produced by: Chris DeFaria
- Starring: Chloë Grace Moretz; Michael Peña; Colin Jost; Rob Delaney; Ken Jeong
- Cinematography: Alan Stewart
- Edited by: Peter S. Elliot
- Music by: Christopher Lennertz
- Production companies: Warner Animation Group; The Story Company; Turner Entertainment Co.
- Distributed by: Warner Bros. Pictures
- Release date: February 26, 2021 (United States)
- Running time: 101 minutes
- Country: United States
- Language: English
- Budget: $50–79 million
- Box office: $136 million

Tom and Jerry, released as Tom & Jerry: The Movie in some territories, is a 2021 American comedy film based on the cartoon characters Tom and Jerry created by William Hanna and Joseph Barbera. Produced by Warner Animation Group, it is the second theatrical film based on the characters, following Tom and Jerry: The Movie (1992). Directed by Tim Story and written by Kevin Costello, the live-action animated film stars Chloë Grace Moretz, Michael Peña, Colin Jost, Rob Delaney and Ken Jeong.

After years of languishing in development hell, including a live-action film in 2009 and an animated film in 2015, a live-action/animated hybrid film was announced in 2018 with Story attached as director. Filming took place at Warner Bros. Studios, Leavesden from July to September 2019. Christopher Lennertz composed the film's score.

Tom and Jerry was theatrically released by Warner Bros. Pictures in the United States on February 26, 2021, alongside a one-month streaming release on HBO Max. The film received generally negative reviews from critics, but was a moderate financial success and grossed $136 million worldwide on a $50‒79 million production budget.

== Plot ==
A cat named Tom, who dreams of being a jazz pianist, moves to Manhattan and busks in Central Park, while a brown mouse named Jerry is in search of a new home. After Tom's piano is destroyed in an altercation, and Tom is exposed as a fraud and a regular cat playing the piano by the residents in Central Park all because of Jerry's antics, he chases Jerry, but accidentally tackles a young woman named Kayla Forester, causing her to lose her job. Down on her luck, Kayla wants to prove her talents and looks for a position at the city's fanciest hotel, the Royal Gate, where Jerry moves in and Tom fails to break in. Kayla, with a stolen resume, is hired to help plan a high-profile wedding and gets a tour of the hotel, while Jerry's usual antics involve stealing food and items to ramp up his new home, and Tom plans more strategies to enter the hotel and capture Jerry.

Local celebrities Preeta Mehta and her fiancé Ben are greeted, as they arrive, along with their pets bulldog Spike and cat Toots. All, except for Spike, are unaware of Jerry stealing from Preeta's handbag. As the couple and their pets are escorted to their room, Jerry's presence is revealed, which puts the wedding and the hotel at risk. Kayla offers to catch Jerry, but fails and realizes that he will be hard to catch. After many failed attempts, Tom successfully enters the hotel, and his ensuing chase after Jerry wrecks a hotel room. Due to noise complaints, Kayla comes to check and befriends Tom, due to their shared goal of catching Jerry. The hotel's owner and general manager Mr. Dubros hires Tom to exterminate Jerry, while Tom and Kayla's boss Terence threatens to fire them if Tom cannot catch Jerry.

After more failed attempts, Tom designs an elaborate mouse trap that gets Jerry out of the hotel. Meanwhile, Kayla helps with the wedding plans and learns that Preeta's engagement ring is missing. Jerry returns, to clash with Tom on the piano, and reveals to Kayla that he had Preeta's ring and agrees to give it back to her in exchange for letting him live in the hotel. Before Kayla can agree, Terence returns from walking Spike and notices Tom looking for Jerry hiding in Kayla's coat pocket, creating a scene that causes Spike, Tom, and Jerry's chase to destroy the lobby. Terence is suspended, while Kayla is promoted to event manager, for returning Preeta's ring. Kayla tells Tom and Jerry that they will have to get along and spend the next day bonding if they want to stay in the hotel, to which they reluctantly agree.

While Kayla takes care of the hotel and manages the wedding with the crew, Tom and Jerry explore the city, but are imprisoned at a pound, after inadvertently committing fan interference at a baseball game. A vengeful Terence separately visits Tom and Jerry and feeds them lies about what they said about each other behind their backs, leading to another duel at the ceremony that throws the wedding into chaos and destroys the rest of the hotel. After Kayla comes clean and leaves in disgrace, Terence evicts Tom, and Preeta renounces the wedding. Realizing that it is their fault, Tom and Jerry put their differences aside, and convince Kayla and the hotel crew, including a skeptical Terence, to salvage the wedding. The pair lure Preeta and Toots to Central Park, where the wedding is held.

Kayla promises to Preeta that Tom and Jerry have atoned for their behavior, and Ben apologizes to Preeta for his extensive expenses, in light of impressing her father. Kayla and the stolen resume's owner reconcile with each other and get jobs at the hotel, while Tom finally becomes a jazz pianist and plays the piano for Toots, with Jerry joining the party until a mishap causes them to fight again. In a post-credit scene, Ben receives a bill for both weddings.

== Cast ==
- Chloë Grace Moretz as Kayla Forester
- Michael Peña as Terence Mendoza
- Colin Jost as Ben
- Rob Delaney as Mr. Henry Dubros
- Pallavi Sharda as Preeta Mehta
- Jordan Bolger as Cameron
- Patsy Ferran as Joy
- Ken Jeong as Chef Jackie
- Paolo Bonolis as a wedding guest
- Ozuna as Assistant hotel staff

=== Voice and animated cast ===
- Tom (credited as Thomas D. Cat), an animated blue/gray bicolor cat
  - He does not have a speaking role, but T-Pain provides his singing voice, with archived vocals from William Hanna, and additional vocals by Kaiji Tang.
- Jerry (credited as Jerome A. Mouse), an animated brown house mouse
  - He does not have a speaking role, but his vocals are provided by André Sogliuzzo.
- Bobby Cannavale as Spike, Ben's gray American bulldog
- Nicky Jam as Butch, a black cat who leads an alley cat gang:
  - Joey Wells as Lightning
  - Harry Ratchford as Topsy
  - Na'im Lynn as Meathead
  - Spank Horton as Ash
- Lil Rel Howery as Tom's shoulder angel and shoulder devil
- Utkarsh Ambudkar as Real Estate Rat
- Tim Story as Pigeon Announcer
- Jeff Bergman as Droopy (uncredited)
- Kaiji Tang as Tiger (uncredited)
- Kaiji Tang and André Sogliuzzo as additional voices

Other Tom and Jerry characters who appear in non-speaking roles include Toots, Preeta's shy beige cat and love interest for Tom, Goldie, the Royal Gate Hotel's goldfish, and Clyde, a large cat in Butch's gang.

== Production ==
=== Prior efforts ===
On January 22, 2009, Warner Bros. Pictures announced plans for a new Tom and Jerry theatrical film, as a live-action/CGI hybrid film produced by Dan Lin with a script written by Eric Gravning, following the success of Alvin and the Chipmunks (2007). It would have followed Tom and Jerry's origins over a Chicago backdrop, where they reluctantly work together to get back home.

On April 6, 2015, plans shifted to a CGI-animated film produced by Warner Animation Group, with a script written by Bryan Schulz and Cornelius Uliano, who co-wrote The Peanuts Movie (2015) with Craig Schulz. It was about a young family who moves into a New England country house inhabited by Jerry and adopts Tom to get rid of him. The duo would team up to protect the family and their house from an outside threat, and learn the meaning of family and friendship. Cate Adams and Jesse Ehrman, who remains an executive producer on the final film, were set to oversee it.

=== Development and writing ===
On October 15, 2018, Variety reported that Tim Story was set to direct a Tom and Jerry film described as a "live-action/animated hybrid," with filming set to begin in 2019. Story was in discussions with Warner Bros. executives about what he was interested in directing after finishing Shaft (2019) for New Line Cinema; when Tom and Jerry was brought up, he "immediately mentioned his admiration for the characters and how he'd love tackling that property." Story said he "could immediately rattle off my favorite episodes off the top of my head. I knew exactly which versions and which situations would work for a modern movie," and said a Tom and Jerry film was his "dream project" to helm. The film pays homage to many Tom and Jerry shorts, including Mouse Trouble (1944), Mouse in Manhattan (1945) and The Cat Concerto (1947).

In August 2021, Sonic the Hedgehog (2020) screenwriter Patrick Casey revealed that he was in discussions with the studio regarding the film, but ultimately parted ways due to creative differences. Casey stated he was adamant that "[although] you can have some human characters and they can have some stuff going on […] they cannot be the protagonists," and claimed that "[wasn't] what [the producers] wanted to hear." The final screenplay was written by Kevin Costello, marking his solo screenwriting debut after previously co-writing Brigsby Bear (2017). The film is set in New York City with a fancy hotel as the primary location; Costello explained that this provided "a much bigger canvas". Producer Chris DeFaria explained that the choice of location was because "there's just a lot of stuff you can break in a really fancy hotel, and a lot of people there who don't want to see a mouse or a cat, much less the two of them pursuing each other through the lobby."

Story was against the idea of making Tom and Jerry speak, believing that their charm largely comes from their silent behavior. Besides the original shorts, he also cited the films of Charlie Chaplin as an influence on how to direct nonverbal storytelling. He compared Tom and Jerry's relationship to a sibling rivalry. DeFaria described Tom and Jerry as "deep, committed rivals, but like brothers and sisters, they're both the most important people in each other's lives. Though I promise they would never admit it!" Story also hoped the film would appeal to longtime fans and a new generation of audiences: "Fingers crossed, if they [William Hanna and Joseph Barbera] are looking from above, they'll be proud of what we made".

Working on Tom and Jerry was a hugely exciting and intimidating experience. There's a reason these characters are still so popular, 81 years later, all over the world, and I wanted to be extremely careful to honor that. Tom and Jerry had to be themselves—look like themselves, not talk like themselves and, obviously, engage in absurd, gleeful, over-the-top cartoon violence. I had so much fun going through the old shorts, trying to break everything down on a character level, and finding ways to recontextualize classic elements in a way that felt nostalgic but new.

— Kevin Costello, in an interview to The Writing Studio

=== Casting ===
In March 2019, it was reported that Zoey Deutch and Olivia Cooke were frontrunners for the lead live-action role of Kayla, "who teams up with Tom to stop the pesky Jerry from ruining an important event for herself". Additionally, Jennifer Lawrence, Camila Cabello, Yara Shahidi, Kelly Marie Tran, Becky G, Isabela Moner, Kathryn Love Newton, Maisie Williams and Olivia Holt were all in consideration for the role. In April, Chloë Grace Moretz was in final negotiations to star in the film. Moretz described Kayla as "a lot like Jerry" and as "a girl who gunned for what she wanted to achieve but realizes that time and honesty is what will prevail in the end", as well as "a total goofball", the latter aspect allowing her to "lean into who [she is] in real life". She felt that the film "really does harken back to the Tom and Jerry we love".

Later that month, in March 2019, it was reported that Peter Dinklage was considered for the role of Terrance, Kayla's boss and the human antagonist of the film. In May 2019, Michael Peña joined the cast in the role Dinklage was eyed for. Colin Jost, Ken Jeong, Rob Delaney, Jordan Bolger and Pallavi Sharda were added to the cast in July. Patsy Ferran was revealed to be part of the cast in September 2019. According to Story, "Everybody was starting with a shared knowledge of these characters and kind of got what the movie should be". In November 2020, Nicky Jam and Lil Rel Howery revealed that they have been cast in the film in voice roles. On December 2, 2020, Jam revealed that he will be the voice of Butch Cat in the film.

=== Filming and production design ===
Principal photography began in July 2019 at Warner Bros. Studios, Leavesden in Hertfordshire, England, and wrapped in September of that same year. The film was shot by cinematographer Alan Stewart, on the Sony VENICE cinema cameras and Panavision Primo 70 and Primo Artiste Lenses. Animators were present during filming, allowing cast members to improvise, while puppeteers handled figures of the animated characters that were designed to match their exact size, which helped the filmmakers with framing and helped the animators with lighting and other cues. The film's cinematography was inspired by the 1945 short Mouse in Manhattan, as Story aimed "to recreate the sense [of scale]."

Wanting the set design and visuals to be "in keeping with the original cartoons", production designer James Hambidge, along with Story and Stewart, aimed for a "bright, poppy and upbeat" look over the typical "dark" look of a Hollywood film. Film colorist John Daro color graded the film using Baselight's Base Grade operator and Curves, to help it achieve the "bright, vibrant and colourful" look of the original cartoons.

That movie [Who Framed Roger Rabbit] was one of our main inspirations. We made it hard on ourselves because we wanted a lot of interaction between the animated characters and the live-action world. We wanted to engage fully with the environment. What's fun about doing hybrid movies is trying to connect the tones, since animated characters have a different set of rules to live by. For example, they can't die and there are certain things they can do that can't be carried out in the human world. We had to make sure those two sets of rules co-existed.

— Tim Story, in an interview to Animation Magazine

=== Visual effects and animation ===
Both visual effects and animation services were provided by Framestore. The original shorts were cited as reference material, as well as films like Who Framed Roger Rabbit (1988) and Mary Poppins (1964). Uli Meyer, a lead animator on Who Framed Roger Rabbit, was given credit as the "Head of Character Animation/Sketchviz" on the film. Animation work was done remotely during the pandemic, with the filmmakers doing creative exploration on certain shots, and finalizing material through production groups.

Around 120 animators worked on the film across Framestore's locations in London and Montreal, with "the goal [of being] true to the 3D medium while maintaining the look and spirit of the 2D cartoons from the '40s and '50s". Compared to other live-action/animated hybrids, Story did not want to adapt the characters into realistic CGI models, and instead sought to "make these characters look like the original material." DeFaria also emphasized the importance of retaining the characters' two-dimensional look and feel, saying "Tom and Jerry are really cute; their designs were really an achievement in animation—the purity of form, how expressive they can be." Visual effects supervisor Frazer Churchill stated that the team sought to include many objects that the characters utilized in the shorts.

According to animation director Michael Eames, the team "looked for a balance where we could lean heavily into the original 2D style but still allow the 3D form of the characters to work seamlessly with real-world, often moving, cameras." To achieve this, a draw-over phase guided by a team of 2D artists was integrated, with character poses and expressions drawn over rough edits. This helped the 3D animators sculpt exaggerated character shapes that were difficult to achieve previously. The team also "developed new rigs that enabled us to squash, stretch and totally deform the characters," as well as a tool that generated outlines onto the characters. Story explained that while the final shots evoked "a vintage 2D look," using 3D computer-animated models was a comparatively faster process than implementing genuine traditional animation.

=== Music ===
On July 22, 2020, it was announced that Tim Story's recurring collaborator and music composer, Christopher Lennertz will compose the film's score. The album was released by WaterTower Music on February 12, having 30 tracks.

== Release ==
=== Theatrical and streaming ===
Tom and Jerry was released in the United States on February 26, 2021, by Warner Bros. Pictures, in theaters and for a month streaming on HBO Max. The movie coincidentally released on Tex Avery's birthdate; the movie has cameos of one of Avery's characters, Droopy, in an animal shelter and on a Joker parody billboard. It is the first film to officially debut the new Warner Animation Group logo to match with the new shield that Warner Bros. debuted in November 2019. It was previously scheduled to be released on April 16, 2021, then on December 23, 2020, and then delayed to March 5, 2021, due to the COVID-19 pandemic, before moving up a week in order to avoid competition with Disney's Raya and the Last Dragon. Samba TV estimated that 1.2 million U.S. households streamed the film over its opening weekend on HBO Max. By the end of its first month, the film was watched in over 2.6 million U.S. households.

On March 8, 2021, some HBO Max viewers who attempted to watch the film were accidentally shown Zack Snyder's Justice League, a movie which was supposed to release 10 days later. HBO Max quickly fixed the issue within two hours.

=== Marketing ===
On September 1, 2020, it was announced that Australian toy company Moose Toys made a deal with Warner Bros. to make merchandise for the film.

On October 28, 2020, it was announced that an animatronic float of the titular duo will appear in the 94th Macy's Thanksgiving Day Parade, to promote the film.

On February 20, 2021, Warner Bros. released two new shorts onto HBO Max titled Tom and Jerry Special Shorts to honor the 81st anniversary of Tom and Jerry, as well as to promote the film. The shorts were removed a month later for unknown reasons, but were brought back on July 8, 2021. The film's writer, Kevin Costello, praised the shorts.

On March 6, 2021, Rob Delaney had been the star guest Announcer for Ant & Dec's Saturday Night Takeaway, whereas the titular characters made an appearance themselves with Tom Jones.

=== Home media ===
The film was available for rent on April 16, while Warner Bros. Home Entertainment released it on DVD, Blu-ray, and digital on May 18, 2021.

== Reception ==
=== Box office ===
Tom and Jerry grossed $46.5 million in the United States and Canada, and $90 million in other territories, for a worldwide total of $136.5 million.

In the United States and Canada, the film grossed $4 million from 2,479 theaters on its first day of release. It went on to debut to $14.1 million, the second-best opening weekend of the pandemic behind Warner Bros.'s December release Wonder Woman 1984 ($16.7 million). The opening weekend audiences were 51% female and 46% under the age of 17, while 35% was Hispanic, 33% Caucasian, 21% African American, and 11% Asian. David Gross, who runs the movie consulting firm Franchise Entertainment Research, said of the figure: "With half of theaters still closed, the pandemic still a threat, and Tom and Jerry available at home, this is a very good opening." In its second weekend the film grossed $6.6 million and in its third made $4 million, finishing second behind newcomer Raya and the Last Dragon both times.

The film was initially released in seven international markets, grossing $1.45 million; Singapore led with $457,000. By its second weekend of international release the film was playing in 16 markets, including debuting at number one in Brazil ($746,000) and Mexico ($395,000).

=== Critical response ===
On Rotten Tomatoes the film has an approval rating of 29% based on 130 reviews, with an average rating of 4.7/10. The site's critics consensus reads, "It isn't the worst of the long-squabbling duo's feature-length adventures, but Tom & Jerry is disappointingly short on the anarchic spirit of their classic shorts." On Metacritic, the film a has weighted average score of 32 out of 100 based on 20 critics, indicating "generally unfavorable reviews". Audiences polled by CinemaScore gave the film an average grade of "A−" on an A+ to F scale, while PostTrak reported 79% of audience members gave it a positive score, with 60% saying they would recommend it.

The Hollywood Reporter's John DeFore said that audiences should just "rewatch Roger Rabbit instead" and wrote: "Tim Story's Tom & Jerry is five to ten minutes of action that might have worked in one of the cartoon duo's shorts, surrounded by an inordinate amount of unimaginative, unfunny human-based conflict." Kevin Maher of The Times gave the film a score of 1 out of 5 stars, writing: "nothing will prepare you for the tone-deaf nature of this live-action abomination that inserts our cartoon protagonists, Who Framed Roger Rabbit-style, into a crass Manhattan misadventure about a celebrity wedding gone awry." Clarisse Loughrey of The Independent gave the film a score of 1 out of 5 stars, describing it as "the cinematic equivalent of a sausage casing stuffed with mystery meat."

Benjamin Lee of The Guardian gave the film a score of 2 out of 5 stars, writing: "While there's little to truly loathe in Fantastic Four and Ride Along director Tim Story's frantic new take on Tom & Jerry, there's also an equal lack of anything to truly love; this is a serviceable, if entirely forgettable attempt to relaunch an old property for a new audience." Writing for RogerEbert.com, Brian Tallerico gave the film one out of four stars, declaring it "[a] depressing affair" and "[a] soulless product, one that will fail equally for adults who grew up on Tom and Jerry, and their kids who have never heard of these characters." Alonso Duralde of The Wrap called the film "frustratingly unfunny" and "a lazy way for a studio to capitalize on some famous characters it happens to own."

Conversely, Matt Fowler of IGN gave the film a score of 6/10, and wrote: "Tom & Jerry is a sufficient family offering with a cool cast, a sparkling soundtrack, and occasional fun. It's too bad that Tom and Jerry often feel like afterthoughts in their own film and that there wasn't much more for them to do other than serve the story of others." Charlotte O'Sullivan of the Evening Standard gave the film a score of 3 out of 5 stars, and wrote: "Ignore catty reviews that present this caper as soulless. Though horribly flawed, its internal organs are in the right place." Peter Debruge of Variety was also positive on the film and said: "Truth be told, the movie's a pretty faithful extension of the frenemies' long-running feud — basically, the two cannot peacefully coexist under the same roof — and as such, we should be grateful to director Tim Story (Shaft) and screenwriter Kevin Costello (Brigsby Bear) for not dropping a two-ton anvil on our nostalgia, the way so many big-studio toonsploitation projects have in recent years."

=== Accolades ===
Year	Award	Category	Recipient	Result	Ref.
2021	Alliance of Women Film Journalists	Time Waster Remake or Sequel Award	Tom and Jerry	Nominated	
2021	Alliance of Women Film Journalists	She Deserves a New Agent Award	Chloë Grace Moretz	Nominated	
2021	People's Choice Awards	Favorite Family Movie	Tom and Jerry	Nominated	
2022	Golden Raspberry Awards	Worst Prequel, Remake, Rip-off or Sequel	Tom and Jerry	Nominated	
2022	Golden Raspberry Awards	Worst Screen Combo	Tom & Jerry (aka Itchy & Scratchy)	Nominated	
2022	Kids' Choice Awards	Favorite Movie	Tom and Jerry	Nominated	

The film was also nominated for the "Best VFX in Feature Film" award, at the 2021 Australian Effects & Animation Festival.

== Television spin-off ==
Tom and Jerry in New York is an HBO Max original animated series produced by Warner Bros. Animation (outsourced by Renegade Animation, the team behind the 2014 Cartoon Network TV series The Tom and Jerry Show) that is a follow-up to the film, which follows Tom and Jerry as new residents of the Royal Gate Hotel, with their usual antics and mayhem to follow them all over the hotel, across Manhattan, New York City and going beyond. It was released on July 1, 2021.

== Notes ==
- Text was copied from Tom and Jerry (2021 film) at Tom&Jerry Wiki, which is released under a Creative Commons Attribution-Share Alike 2.0 (Unported) (CC-BY-SA 3.0) license.
