= Jordan Bolger =

English actor

- Born: Radford, England, UK
- Education: Tring Park School for the Performing Arts
- Occupation: Actor
- Years active: 2014–present

Jordan Bolger is an English actor. He has performed in television, notably in Peaky Blinders, The 100, The Book of Boba Fett, This Town, and The Witness (2026). In film, he is known for side roles in Tom & Jerry and The Woman King.

== Early life and education ==
Bolger was born in Radford, Coventry, England, to a Jamaican father and English mother, and has a brother Daniell. He was brought up by his single mother Liz, who is a gym instructor. He did taekwondo and kickboxing as a youth.

He trained as a dancer at the Tring Park School for the Performing Arts.

== Career ==
Originally intending to be a professional dancer, Bolger injured himself at a dancing audition and decided to audition as an actor instead.

His first acting role was as Isaiah Jesus in the British period crime drama television series Peaky Blinders. He made 13 appearances in the show from 2014 to 2017, before exiting the show due to clashing schedules. In 2018, he appeared on the post-apocalyptic science fiction drama The 100, cast as Miles Ezekial Shaw.

In 2021, he made his Hollywood debut in a side role in the comedy film Tom & Jerry. In 2022, he was cast as the recurring character Skad in the Star Wars spinoff television series The Book of Boba Fett. He appeared in a supporting role, Malik, in the 2022 film The Woman King.

== Filmography ==
=== Film ===
Year	Title	Role	Notes
2014	Will You Kill Me Now?	AJ	
2015	Is This Rape?: Sex on Trial	Phil	
2015	War	Darryl	
2016	The Habit of Beauty	Kevin	
2016	Don't Knock Twice	Danny	
2016	iBoy	Danny	
2018	Scarborough	Daz	
2020	Caramaka: Worlds Apart	Caramaka	
2021	Tom & Jerry	Cameron	
2022	The Woman King	Malik	
2024	Heavyweight	Diamond Derek Douglas	
2024	The Crow	Chance	

=== Television ===
Year	Title	Role	Notes
2014-2017	Peaky Blinders	Isaiah Jesus	
2015	Casualty	Matt Conley	
2015	The Dumping Ground	Zach	
2017	Into the Badlands	Tate	
2017	In the Dark	East	
2018	The Long Song	Nimrod	
2018-2019	The 100	Miles Ezekial Shaw	
2019	David Makes Man	Shinobi	
2022	The Book of Boba Fett	Skad	
2024	This Town	Gregory Williams	
2026	The Witness	André Hanscombe	
