= Runnymede F.C. =

English Football club

Runnymede
- Full name: Runnymede Football Club
- Founded: 1876
- Dissolved: 1878
- Ground: Railway Inn, Egham
- Secretary: Harry Sedgwick
- Captain: S. H. Goodhart
Home colours

Runnymede F.C. was an English association football club from Egham, Surrey, founded in 1876.

== History ==
The club's first recorded match was in November 1876 against St Mark's of Windsor.

Despite having a full fixture list in 1876–77 and 1877–78, the club disbanded in 1878. The club relied on players from St Mark's and the University of Cambridge - mostly old Etonians - and in October 1878 its players decided to throw in their lot with the Gitanos club, another club with Etonian links.

The decision came after the club had played its only tie in the FA Cup. Its 1878–79 FA Cup first round match with Panthers of Sturminster Newton, at home, ended in a draw, and the club disbanded before playing the replay.

== Colours ==
The club played in light blue and brown quarters, which, in the context of the times, usually referred to halves.

== Ground ==
The Runnymede Club Ground was at the Railway Inn, a quarter of a mile from Egham railway station.

== Famous players ==
- Harry Goodhart, whose brother was club captain, but who appeared for Runnymede at least once.
- Charles and Ernest Bambridge, England internationals
- Harry Sedgwick, forward and club secretary, player with the Old Etonians, and a goalscorer for the England Probables side in 1878 and reserve for the England v Scotland match in 1879
- Frederick Rawson, who appeared in the club's first match.
