= Stanley Scott =

English cricketer and footballer

Personal information
- Full name: Stanley Winckworth Scott
- Born: 24 March 1854; Bombay, Bombay Presidency, British India
- Died: 8 December 1933 (aged 79); Beckenham, Kent, England
- Batting: Right-handed
- Bowling: Right-arm fast
- Role: Batsman

Domestic team information
- Years: Team
- 1878–1893: Middlesex

Career statistics
Competition	First-class
Matches	104
Runs scored	4,432
Batting average	25.61
100s/50s	4/23
Top score	224
Balls bowled	458
Wickets	3
Bowling average	69.00
5 wickets in innings	0
10 wickets in match	0
Best bowling	1/15
Catches/stumpings	61/–
- Source: ESPNcricinfo, 16 April 2017

Stanley Winckworth Scott (24 March 1854 – 8 December 1933) was an English cricketer who played for Middlesex.

Scott was a middle-order batsman who played fairly regularly for Middlesex from 1878 to 1893, heading the batting averages in several seasons, though by modern standards his figures appear modest. His best season was 1892, when he scored 1015 runs at an average of 39 runs per innings, and against Gloucestershire at Lord's that season he scored 224, then regarded as a colossal score. He did well that season in both Gentlemen v Players matches at Lord's and The Oval, and was named as a Wisden Cricketer of the Year in 1893.

He also played football and played for Clapham Rovers in the 1879 FA Cup Final, losing 1–0 to the Old Etonians.

== Honours ==
Clapham Rovers

- FA Cup finalist: 1879
