= Charles Clerke (footballer) =

English footballer

Charles John Clerke (8 September 1857 – 7 November 1944) was an English amateur footballer who scored the only goal in the 1879 FA Cup Final.

== Birth ==
Clerke was born at Hanover Square, London and christened at St George's, Hanover Square in December 1857. He was the fourth child of Sir William Henry Clerke (1822–1882) from Clonmel, County Tipperary, Ireland who was Principal Clerk in the Treasury and succeeded to the title of 10th Baronet Clerke, of Hitcham on 16 February 1861.

== Football career ==
Clerke was educated at Eton College and in 1878 joined the Old Etonians football XI. He went up to Christ Church, Oxford, and represented the University of Oxford at cricket.

Having scored three goals in the Old Boys' run to the 1879 FA Cup Final, he was selected at outside-left for the final itself, played at Kennington Oval on 29 March 1879. This was the Old Etonians third Final, whereas their opponents, Clapham Rovers had reached the final for the first time. Clapham dominated the early stages of the final but the first half finished goalless. The only goal of the game came after 59 minutes, when "the energetic" Clerke scored from close range following a run from Harry Goodhart. The Old Etonians thus claimed the cup for the first time in what was considered to be "the poorest FA Cup Final to date".

In March 1880, he was selected for the international match between England and Wales but withdrew with an injury.

== Cricket career ==
Clerke played cricket for Herefordshire between 1877 and 1880, Shropshire between 1880 and 1891 and Radnorshire between 1885 and 1888. He was also a member of the M.C.C. and the Free Foresters.

== Family ==
Clerke was married on 26 July 1892 to Augusta Laura Daniel and their only child, Nicholas John Clerke was born on 9 March 1912. Nicholas graduated from Corpus Christi College, Cambridge University as a Master of Arts. He gained the rank of 2nd Lieutenant in the 62nd (Northumbrian) AA Brigade, Royal Artillery (Territorial Army) and was killed at Dunkirk between 27 May 1940 and 2 June 1940.

By profession, Clerke was a farmer owning substantial land in Hampshire. He died on 7 November 1944, aged 87 at Farnborough Park, Hampshire.

== Honours ==
Old Etonians

- FA Cup winners: 1879
