= Darwen F.C. (1870) =

English football club, 1870–2009

Darwen
- Full name: Darwen Football Club
- Nicknames: The Salmoners; The Darreners
- Founded: 1870 (1875 as an association football club)
- Dissolved: 2009; 17 years ago
- Ground: Anchor Ground
- Capacity: 4,000
- 2008–09: North West Counties League; Division Two, 13th
Home colours	Away colours

Darwen Football Club was an association football club from Darwen in Lancashire, England. The team, formed in 1870, was an early pioneer of professional football in Northern England, reaching the semi-finals of the 1880–81 FA Cup. They were a Football League member from 1891 to 1899. Darwen joined the Lancashire League in 1900 and remained in regional football afterwards. They last played in the First Division of the North West Counties Football League in 2008–09, when the club was wound-up. A phoenix club, AFC Darwen, was founded soon after. Darwen played their home games at the Anchor Ground.

== History ==
=== 19th Century ===
The club originally played rugby football, as well as cricket. It adopted association rules in 1875.

In October 1878, at their Barley Bank ground, Darwen played a representative team from Blackburn under floodlights. This is believed to be one of the first in football. The game was a huge success (not only because Darwen won 3–0) but the experiment was not repeated in that era.

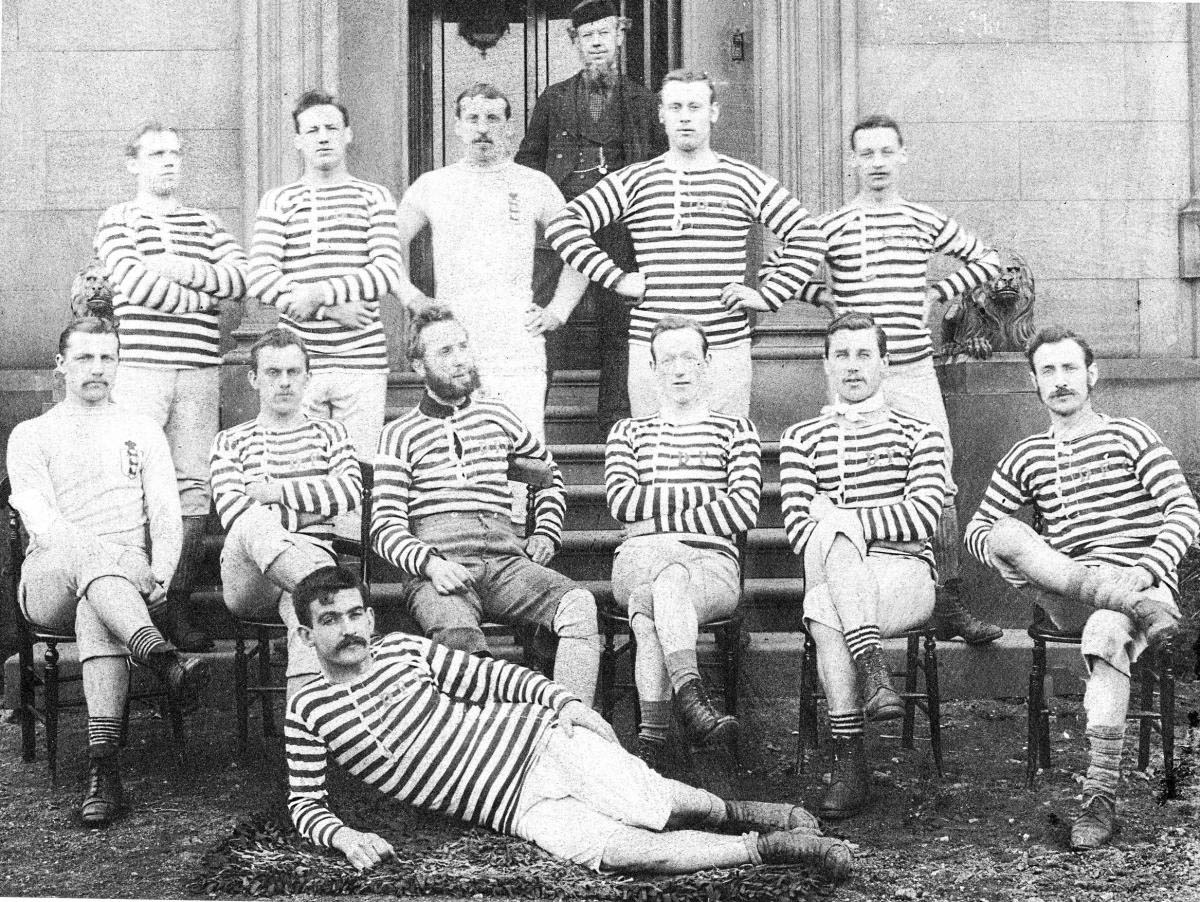
Darwen FC Team, 1879–80. Fergie Suter is on the floor

Darwen was the first club from Northern England to achieve any success in the FA Cup, reaching the quarter-finals in 1879. They caused controversy in this competition by signing two professional players, Fergie Suter and Jimmy Love, both from Partick, a Scottish club based in Glasgow. This is believed to be the first involvement of professional players in English football. One London club proposed that "no side which does not consist entirely of amateurs, as defined by the rules to be drawn up by the committee, be entitled to compete in the Challenge Cup competition". (Note the words "rules to be drawn up", which imply that there was no rule forbidding professionals at the time.) The motion was defeated and Darwen travelled down to the Oval to play the great amateur side Old Etonians in the quarter-final. They needed to make the journey three times, drawing 5–5 and 2–2 before losing 6–2 in the second replay.

An FA Cup regulation of that time ruled that the final three rounds of the competition were to be played in London. This was changed following Darwen's experiences in 1879, and entries were subsequently grouped by region. Two years later, in 1881, Darwen went one better and reached the semi-finals of the FA Cup. They beat Romford 15–0 in the quarter-final.

Kit uniform
(1875–91)

On Whit Monday, May 1880, Aston Villa Football Club arranged a six-a-side football tournament at their Wellington Road ground. Darwen entered along with other clubs, Blackburn Rovers, Wednesbury Old Athletic, Walsall Swifts, Elwell's, and Notts Forest.

In 1891 Darwen were elected to the Football League following expansion of the League to fourteen teams. League rules meant that teams could not have the same coloured kits and as Notts County had already taken black and white stripes, Darwen adopted a salmon pink top from which their nickname "The Salmoners" originates. In March 1892 they lost 12–0 to West Bromwich Albion, and this winning margin has never been surpassed in the League's top division (although it was equalled in 1909 when Nottingham Forest beat Leicester Fosse by the same score).

Darwen finished bottom of the League in their first season and were relegated to become founder members of the Second Division, the first club to suffer in-League relegation. Ironically, 14th (out of 14) in 1891–92 remains their highest ever placing in the Football League.

In 1893 they finished in third place and were promoted back to the First Division via the test matches, but they were relegated again in 1894. They remained in the Second Division until 1899, when they did not apply for re-election. They had spent eight seasons in the League, two of them in the top flight.

During their last season as a League club, in 1898–99, Darwen suffered 18 consecutive defeats. This remains a record, although Sunderland narrowly avoided equalling it in 2003 by losing 17 consecutive league games. They also set a record for the most goals conceded by a team in any Football League season, with 141.

Until 1894, the football club was formally the footballing branch of the Darwen Football and Cricket Club. In 1894 it was decided to dissolve this organisation and create separately a Darwen Football Club and a Darwen Cricket Club. No doubt the cricketing fraternity felt they were being dwarfed by the footballers and yet they were equally liable for the footballers' debts. The accounts for 1893-94 show that the football section had receipts of £2,600 whilst the cricket section showed income of just over £300, yet the footballers ran at a loss whilst the cricketers showed a surplus. Debts at the time of dissolution were over £600 and it was agreed to hold joint fundraising to clear that debt. Two years later, in 1896, with losses mounting, the club became a limited company. Darwen Football Club Limited went into voluntary liquidation at the end of the 1898–99 season, being unable to meet its liabilities. It was replaced, almost immediately, by a new club run by a committee. The new club joined the Lancashire League. It was also in 1899 that they moved from Barley Bank to the Anchor Ground, after the owner of Barley Bank, the Lord of the Manor, refused to offer the new club a lease.

=== 20th Century ===
In 1900-01 Darwen entertained Woolwich Arsenal in the FA Cup, losing by a 2–0 margin. Darwen had refused Arsenal's offer of £150 to switch the tie to London and attracted a 7,000 crowd to the Anchor Ground.

In 1902 they won the Lancashire League title, remaining unbeaten all season. Two years later they joined the Lancashire Combination, and they played in this league for the following 70 years (apart from a break during and immediately after World War I).

In 1904 the club was in very advanced discussions over moving from the Anchor Ground to a new one at Ellison Fold. The ground was used by Trinity and Lower Chapel cricket clubs and was considered to be more accessible from the town centre. In mid-July a subcommittee was authorised to sign the lease agreement on behalf of the club but this never materialised.

Darwen won five trophies in the three years from 1930 to 1933, including consecutive Lancashire Combination titles in 1931 and 1932. In the 1931–32 season FA Cup, they beat Football League side Chester in front of a 10,000 crowd at the Anchor Ground and were rewarded with an away draw at reigning league champions Arsenal in the third round. Darwen lost 11–1 but Arsenal were so impressed with Lancashire sportsmanship that they presented their visitors with a set of their own red strip, which Darwen wore more or less ever after. The club reached the first round of the FA Cup in the following four seasons.

They were champions of the Combination four times, and following the fourth title in 1976 they joined the more prestigious Cheshire County League. Six years later, in 1982, they became founder members of the North West Counties League. They won the League Cup in its inaugural season. They spent three seasons in the Second Division in the mid-1980s, and were relegated again in 1998 on account of ground regulations. They remained in the Second Division from then until their winding up.

=== 21st Century ===
On 22 December 2003, Carlsberg-Tetley tried to wind up Darwen Football and Social Club. The club avoided liquidation on that occasion. On 14 April 2008, another winding up petition was brought by the Bee radio station in respect of £8,000 owed for advertising. Plans were made for Blackburn with Darwen Council to buy the Anchor Ground. Following two further petitions for liquidation brought by Thwaites Brewery and ING Lease UK and their refusal of an offer of 25p in the pound, on 14 May 2009 the Darwen Club was wound up in the High Court. The 134-year-old Darwen F.C. therefore ceased to exist.

A successor club called A.F.C. Darwen was formed in May 2009, joining the West Lancashire League. In June 2022, A.F.C. Darwen took on the name of the fallen Darwen Football Club.

== League and cup record ==
- 1879–80 – Winners of the first Lancashire Cup competition defeating Blackburn Rovers in the final.
- 1880–81 – FA Cup semi-finalists (after beating Romford 15–0 in quarter-finals)
- 1889–90 – Founder member of Football Alliance
- 1891–92 – Elected into Football League
- 1892–93 – Not re-elected into First Division, but elected as a founder member of Football League Second Division. Promoted after Test Match
- 1893–94 – Relegated after Test Match
- 1899 – Did not seek re-election to Football League
- 1899–1900 – Joined Lancashire League
- 1901–02 – Lancashire League Champions
- 1902–03 – Lancashire League runner-up (on goal average)
- 1903–04 – Joined Lancashire Combination Division One
- 1905–06 – Lancashire Combination runner-up
- 1909 – Relegated to Division Two
- 1914 – Left Lancashire Combination
- 1920–21 – Rejoined Lancashire Combination
- 1930–31 – Lancashire Combination Champions
- 1931–32 – Lancashire Combination Champions (2nd time)
- 1963 – Relegated to Division Two
- 1965–66 – Promoted to Division One
- 1967 – Relegated to Division Two
- 1967–68 – Lancashire Combination Division Two runner-up
- 1971–72 – Lancashire Combination Champions (3rd time)
- 1973–74 – Lancashire Combination runner-up (on goal average)
- 1974–75 – Lancashire Combination Champions (4th time)
- 1975–76 – Joined Cheshire County League
- 1982–83 – Founder members of North West Counties League
- 1984 – Relegated to Division Two
- 1984–85 – Escaped relegation due to Padiham having 2 points deducted
- 1986–87 – Promoted to Division One
- 1998 – Demoted to Division Two due to ground gradings
- Best league position: 14th (of 14) in (only division) Football League, 1891–92; or 15th of 16 in 1893–94 in the 1st Division of the Football League.
- Best (post-war) league position: 5th in North-West Counties League (then level 8), 1988–89

[Champions Cup] Winners: 1967,1968

- Lancashire League Champions 1902. Runners-up 1903
- Lancashire Cup winners 1880, finalists 1883, 1891.
- Lancashire Junior Cup winners 1933, finalists 1929, 1930, 1949, 1999.

North West Counties Football League League Challenge Cup Champions 1982–83

=== Cup records ===
- Best FA Cup performance: Semi-finals, 1880–81
- Best FA Trophy performance: Second round, 1972–73, 1978–79, 1981–82
- Best FA Vase performance: Third round, 1990–91

== Rivalries ==
During the early decades of its existence Darwen had a fierce rivalry with Blackburn Rovers, with many of their games being dogged by crowd trouble between both sets of fans. The rivalry became increasingly bitter, especially after Fergie Suter left Darwen in order to join Blackburn in 1880.

The teams played each other eight times competitively, with Blackburn winning seven and Darwen winning one.

The rivalry died down with the rise of Blackburn and the fall of Darwen with the two teams not meeting again.

== Notable former players and managers ==
- Norman Bell (player-manager), former forward with Wolverhampton Wanderers and Blackburn Rovers
- Horace Fairhurst, former Blackpool player who died as a result of a head injury sustained during a game
- Joe Smith (player-manager), formerly manager of Blackpool for 23 years, guiding them to victory in the famous FA Cup final of 1953
- Fergus Suter, arguably the world's first professional footballer. He joined Darwen F.C in 1878. He made a controversial move to Blackburn Rovers in 1880. He appeared in four FA Cup finals, gaining three winner's medals
- Malcolm Sutherland, scored 19 goals in 51 appearances for the club
- Sam Wadsworth Started his career with Darwen F.C. Played nine times for England, captaining the team on four occasions and was captain of Huddersfield Town when they achieved the League Championship treble from 1924 to 1926. He also won the FA Cup with them in 1922

=== England internationals ===
Four Darwen players were capped for England.

The full list of England players (with the number of caps received whilst registered with Darwen F.C.) were:

- William Brindle (2 caps)
- Joseph Marsden (1 cap)
- Thomas Marshall (2 caps)
- Thurston Rostron (2 caps)

== In popular culture ==
In August 2017 a play called "The Giant Killers" was produced at The Edinburgh Fringe festival, telling the story of the formation of the club and their 1878–79 cup run. The play was produced by The Long Lane Theatre Company. The play then toured the country with the support of The Arts Council England. On 19 October 2018 it was performed, to standing ovations, in Darwen at The Library Theatre.

In 2020, the club, their signing of Fergus Suter and their rivalry with Old Etonians was the basis of The English Game a series on Netflix.
