= James Harkness (actor) =

Scottish actor

- Born: James Harkness; Glasgow, Scotland
- Education: London Academy of Music and Dramatic Art (LAMDA)
- Occupation: Actor
- Years active: 2012–present
- Spouse: Tanya Harkness
- Children: 1

James Harkness is a Scottish actor. He is known for his roles as Craig Myers in the BBC crime drama The Victim (2019), as James in BBC drama The Nest (2020) and footballer Jimmy Love in the Netflix drama The English Game (2020) and the Sky Original Gangs of London.

== Early life ==
Harkness was raised by his mother in a deprived household in the Gorbals area of Glasgow. He studied at King's Park Secondary School and took an interest in drama from an early age. At the age of 18, he suffered arm injuries from being struck with an axe (a weapon he brought to a confrontation relating to a stolen mobile phone), which later caused panic attacks when he passed the location of the incident – Pollokshaws – or even saw someone walking with a phone.

Harkness was chosen by BAFTA as part of their BAFTA Elevate 2019 group programme which provides a support and network to aspiring young actors.

== Filmography ==
=== Film ===
| Year | Title | Role | Notes |
|---|---|---|---|
| 2015 | Macbeth | Angus | |
| 2015 | The Program | Wayne | |
| 2016 | Rogue One: A Star Wars Story | Private Basteren | |
| 2017 | Darkest Hour | A.D. Nicholl | |
| 2018 | Wild Rose | Elliot | |
| 2021 | Spencer | Footman Paul | |
| 2022 | Poison Arrows | Terry McClean | |
| 2023 | Betrayal | Miller | |

=== Television ===
| Year | Title | Role | Notes |
|---|---|---|---|
| 2014 | Silent Witness | Jerome Nelson | 2 episodes |
| 2014 | Unforgettable | Rudy | Episode: "A Stray Bullet" |
| 2015 | Suspects | Eddie Mulville | Episode: "AWOL" |
| 2016 | Retribution | Matt | Episode: "The Storm" |
| 2016 | In Plain Sight | Joe Brannan | 2 episodes |
| 2017 | Tin Star | Foxy | Episode: "Fortunate Boy" |
| 2019 | The Victim | Craig Myers | Main role |
| 2020 | The Nest | James | Main role |
| 2020 | The English Game | Jimmy Love | Main role |
| 2020 | Gangs of London | Kev | 2 episodes |
| 2021 | Anne Boleyn | William Kingston | 2 episodes |
| 2022 | Raised by Wolves | Tamerlane | 5 episodes |
| 2023 | The Sixth Commandment | DS Richard Earl | Supporting role |
| 2025 | The Bombing of Pan Am 103 | DS Sandy Gay | 4 episodes |
| 2025-26 | A Thousand Blows | Brenner | 4 episodes |
