= Unity F.C. (England) =

English football club

Unity
- Full name: Unity Football Club
- Founded: 1875
- Dissolved: 1896?
- Ground: Green Man Hotel, Blackheath
- Secretary: F. S. Mowser
Home colours

Unity F.C. was an English association football club from Blackheath, founded in 1875.

== History ==
The club was the works side of the William Tarn & Co department store in Elephant & Castle, and the club's three secretaries all give the store's address (165 Newington Causeway) as the club's correspondence address. In common with other department store sides in the area, the club was a member of the West End Football Association, and won the Challenge Cup in 1885 and 1889, and was also runner-up in 1884 and 1890.

The club's first recorded match was in November 1876 against Prairie Rangers. Unity was originally of little account; in 1877 it claimed to have won only one match the previous season and only scored two goals. However, in the 1877–78 season it won 8 and drew 8 of its 20 matches, scoring 14 and conceding 11.

Possibly as a result of this improvement the club entered the FA Cup in 1878–79. However, having been drawn to play the Remnants club, Unity withdrew.

It was the club's only FA Cup entry, even though the club remained members of the Football Association until 1883, and active until as late as 1895; the club was still of status enough in 1888 to play Luton Town on Boxing Day. A Unity F.C. was merged into the All Saints club of Middlesex at the start of 1896 and there is no further record of the Tarn club afterwards.

== Colours ==
The club played in navy blue and cerise.

== Ground ==
The club played at the Green Man Hotel in Blackheath.
