= Enteric fever =

Bacterial disease caused by the bacteria Salmonellosis

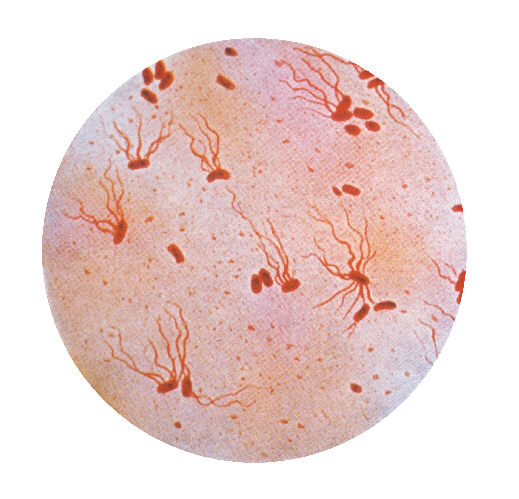
- Microscopic image of Typhoid Fever bacteria

Enteric fever is a medical term encompassing two types of salmonellosis, which, specifically, are Salmonella enterica serovar Typhi (S Typhi), commonly known as Typhoid fever, and Salmonella enterica serovar Paratyphi A, B, or C (S Paratyphi), also known as paratyphoid fever. Both S Typhi and S Paratyphi are motile gram-negative bacteria in the Enterobacteriacae family.

== Pathogenicity ==
S Typhi contains virulence associated genes in pathogenicity islands that have genes such as Vi capsular antigen, flagella antigens, and Type III secretion systems. Humans are the only reservoir of this infection.

Various human challenge studies suggest that bacteria passing through the gastric acid barrier in the stomach require an infectious dose of S Typhi or S Paratyphi bacteria of around 10^{3}-10^{4}. Risk factors for increased pathogenicity include reduced gastric acidity due to the use of proton pump inhibitor medication or prior infection with H. Pylori.

Several specific host genetic polymorphisms such as variations in the HLA-DRB1 have been shown to be associated with the risk of typhoid and severe disease.

== Pathophysiology of infection ==
Physiologically, bacteria pass through the wall of the ileum through the M-cells which lie over the Peyers patches and are ingested by the monocyte-macrophage cells within the submucosa and mesenteric lymph nodes. The bacteria then travel via the lymphatic system and the bloodstream to the reticuloendothelial system which includes the liver, spleen, and bone marrow and multiply in within this system. Re-invasion of the bloodstream typically coincides with the onset of symptoms. Bacterial load in the bone marrow is also shown to be correlated with elevations in liver transaminases as well as higher proportion of bone marrow cultures are positive with increasing disease severity. It is suggested that bacteria in the reticuloendothelial system reflects the bacterial disease burden. Cytokines which include IL-6 and TNF have been shown to be elevated in infection, albeit notably less than Gram-negative septic shock.

Typical incubation period is documented at around 7-21 days but can be as short as 2 days with the majority of cases being at 28 days.

Children are found to have higher blood bacterial counts than adults and it has been found that blood bacterial counts decline in both populations decline with increasing duration of illness.

== Transmission ==
The transmission of Salmonella Typhi and Salmonella Paratyphi is identified to occur fecal-orally through contaminated food or water sources.There are two cycles of transmission that have been identified: short-cycle and long-cycle transmission. Short cycle-transmission is usually due to inadequate sanitation when bacteria contaminate the environment through acute or chronic carriers and Long cycle transmission is due to pollution of large bodies of water from sewage.

The bacteria can also survive in water and ice, which includes contamination risk in fresh water, utensils, raw fruit, vegetables, and improperly heated or cooked food.

Direct fecal-oral transmission is also been identified in specific populations such as men who have sex with men, whereas, vertical transmission with neonatal typhoid is rare.

In low-income countries, outbreaks of enteric fever is mostly linked to fecal contamination from burst sewer pipes, lack of chlorination, drinking water sources close to sewage. In higher income countries, enteric fever outbreaks were more likely via food-bourne transmission as a result of asymptomatic chronic carriers or food handlers.

== Presentation ==
Enteric fever usually presents with gradual onset usually over the course of 3 to 7 days and usually consists of fevers with increasingly high temperatures, malaise, headaches, dry cough, and myalgia. If left untreated, enteric fever can progress into the second week and can present with persistent high fevers with bradycardia, palpable liver and spleen, and confusion.

Presentations can vary among children and adults. Common clinical features in children include days of consecutive high fevers, nausea, vomiting, diarrhea or constipation, hepatomegaly, splenomegaly, and abdominal distention. Anemia and leukopenia are also common laboratory findings seen in this population. Younger children have also been documented to present with non-specific fever with inconclusive laboratory results and atypical clinical features.

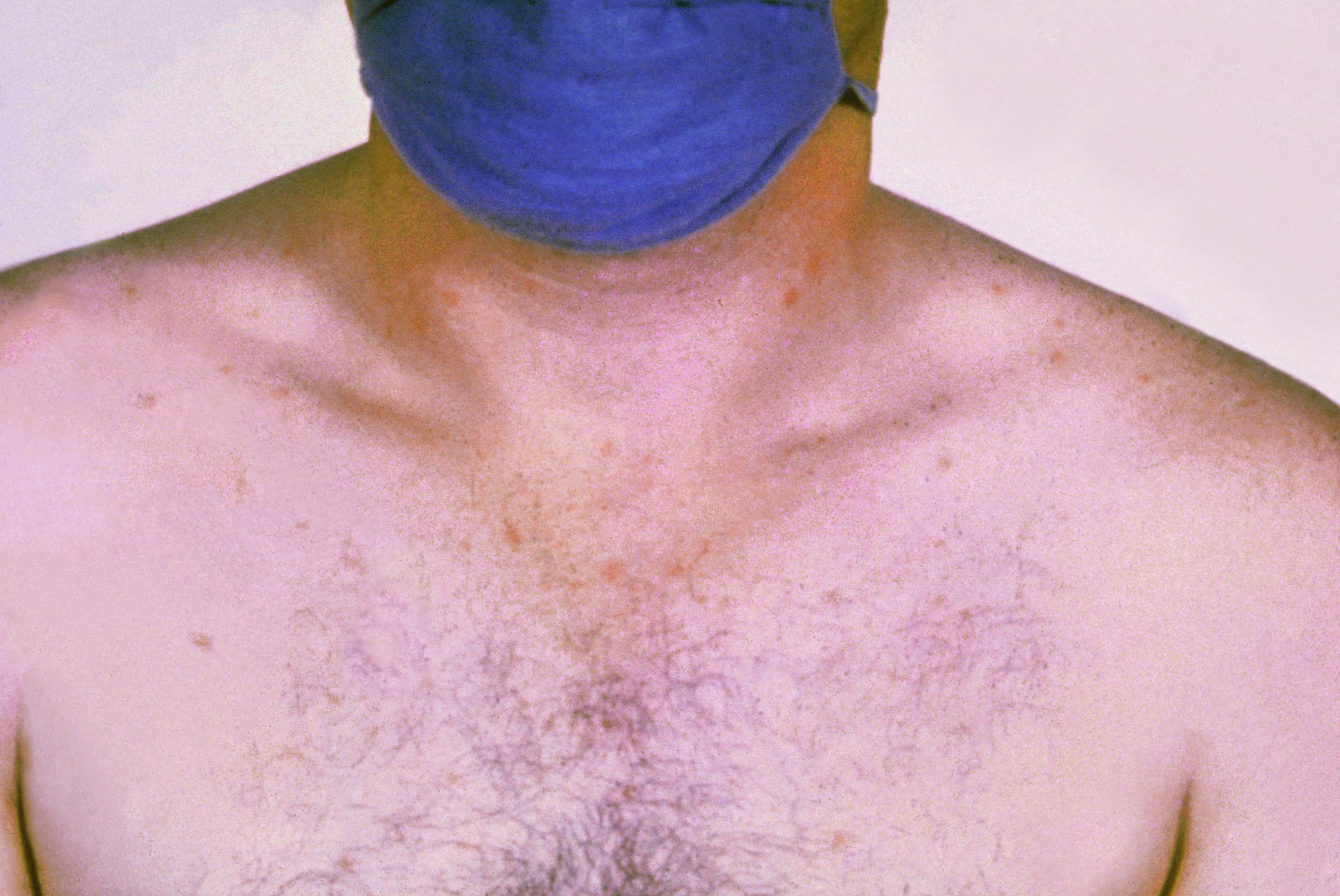
Rose colored spots present on the chest of a patient with typhoid fever

In adults, clinical features of enteric fever include slowly rising fever over consecutive days, abdominal pain, nausea, vomiting, diarrhea or constipation, headache, anorexia, hepatosplenomegaly, and cough are also common. Most notably, rose spots, blanching erythematous maculopapular lesions usually about 2-4 mm in diameter are common and are usually present on the trunk; however, rose spots are not pathognomonic for enteric fever.

== Epidemiology ==
Enteric fever is most commonly found in populations in low and middle income countries that lack access to clean and safe drinking water, sanitation, and hygiene, also abbreviated as WASH. Inadequate WASH, observed in countries in Asia and Africa, is often linked to morbidity and mortality associated with this illness.

The Global Burden of Disease Study estimates that there are about 9.3 million cases of enteric fever globally as of 2021. Taking into account the estimated global burden of enteric fever, 62% of cases occurring in south Asia. As of 2021, the global mortality in 2021 was estimated at more than 100,000 deaths each year.

== Treatment ==
Enteric fever treatment consists of antibiotics and supportive care with monitoring for complications. Patients are treated empirically outpatient in the first week. After empiric treatment, if symptoms do not resolve or worsen to vomiting, severe dehydration, and/or hemodynamic instability, then hospitalization is indicated.

Antibiotics for the treatment of enteric fever are Ciprofloxacin, Ceftriaxone, and Azithromycin as first-line agents recommended by the World Health Organization. However, other antimicrobial agents such as Amoxicillin, Trimethorpim-sulphamethazozole, and Chloramphenicol have also been used historically. Choice of antimicrobial agents is highly dependent on local and national resistance patterns, which can vary significantly by region and time.

Standard course for treatment is usually 7–14 days, more than 5 days after fever resolution, and shorter courses can be effective if the illness is uncomplicated.
