= 1876–77 Home Nations rugby union matches =

The 1876–77 Home Nations rugby union matches are a series of international friendlies held between the England, Ireland and Scotland national rugby union teams.

== Results ==
5 February 1877

England	2 – 0	Ireland

Kennington Oval, England

19 February 1877

Ireland	0 – 6	Scotland

Ormeau Cricket Ground, Ireland

5 March 1877

Scotland	1 – 0	England

Raeburn Place, Scotland

=== Scoring system ===
The matches for this season were decided on goals scored. A goal was awarded for a successful conversion after a try, for a dropped goal or for a goal from mark. If a game was drawn, any unconverted tries were tallied to give a winner. If there was still no clear winner, the match was declared a draw.

== Matches ==
=== England vs. Ireland ===
5 February 1877

England	2G 2T – nil	Ireland
Try: Hornby; Hutchinson (2); Adams; Con: Stokes (2)

Kennington Oval, London
Referee: A. G. Guillemard (England)

England: LH Birkett (Clapham Rovers), L Stokes (Blackheath F.C.), A. N. Hornby (Preston), Reg Birkett (Clapham Rovers), WC Hutchinson (I.C.E. College), PLA Price (I.C.E. College), Edward Kewley (Liverpool) capt., FR Adams (Richmond), RH Fowler (Leeds), Murray Marshall (Blackheath F.C.), G Harrison (Hull), WH Hunt (Preston), Charles Touzel (Cambridge University), FH Lee (Oxford University), Edward Beadon Turner (St. George's Hospital)

Ireland: RB Walkington (NIFC), R Galbraith (Dublin University) capt:, H Brown (Windsor), FW Kidd (Lansdowne), AM Whitestone (Dublin University), TG Gordon (NIFC), HW Jackson (Dublin University), HL Cox (Dublin University), W Finlay (NIFC), J Ireland (Windsor), WH Wilson (Dublin University), HG Edwards (Dublin University), HC Kelly (NIFC), T Brown (Windsor), WJ Hamilton (Dublin University)

=== Ireland vs. Scotland ===
19 February 1877

Ireland	nil – 4G 2DG 2T	Scotland
		Try: MacKenzie (3); Pocock; Irvine; Reid; Con: Cross (4); Drop: MacKenzie (2)

Ormeau Cricket Ground, Ireland
Referee: A Buchanan (Scotland)

Ireland: RGM Shaw, H Moore, RB Walkington, FW Kidd, J Heron, TG Gordon, J Correll, HL Cox, W Finlay, JA McDonald, WH Wilson capt:, HW Murray, HC Kelly, T Brown, WH Ash

Scotland: HH Johnston (Edinburgh University RFC), Malcolm Cross, RC MacKenzie, EI Pocock (Edinburgh Wanderers), JR Hay-Gordon, Stewart Henry Smith, DH Watson, D Lang, Charles Villar, RW Irvine capt., AG Petrie, JHS Graham, Henry Melville Napier, J Reid, JE Junor

=== Scotland vs. England ===
11 March 1877

Scotland	1DG – nil	England
Drop: Cross

Raeburn Place, Scotland
Referee: W Cross (Scotland)

England: LH Birkett, L Stokes, A. N. Hornby, AW Pearson, WAD Evanson, PLA Price, Edward Kewley capt., HWT Garnett, R Todd, Murray Marshall, G Harrison (Hull), WH Hunt (Preston), Charles Touzel, CC Bryden, AF Law

Scotland: JS Carrick, HH Johnston (Edinburgh Collegiate RFC), Malcolm Cross, RC MacKenzie, EI Pocock (Edinburgh Wanderers), JR Hay-Gordon, DH Watson, TJ Torrie, Charles Villar, RW Irvine capt., AG Petrie, JHS Graham, Henry Melville Napier, J Reid, JE Junor

== Bibliography ==
- Griffiths, John (1987). The Phoenix Book of International Rugby Records. London: Phoenix House. ISBN 0-460-07003-7.
