= 1874–75 Home Nations rugby union matches =

International rugby matches

The 1874–75 Home Nations rugby union matches are a series of international friendlies held between the England, Ireland and Scotland national rugby union teams. This season of games was notable as it saw the first international appearance of the Ireland team.

== Results ==
15 February 1875

England	2 – 0	Ireland

Kennington Oval, England

8 March 1875

Scotland	0 – 0	England

Raeburn Place, Scotland

=== Scoring system ===
The matches for this season were decided on goals scored. A goal was awarded for a successful conversion after a try, for a dropped goal or for a goal from mark. If a game was drawn, any unconverted tries were tallied to give a winner. If there was still no clear winner, the match was declared a draw.

== The matches ==
=== England vs. Ireland ===
15 February 1875

England	1G, 1DG, 1T – nil	Ireland
Try: Cheston; Michell; Con: Pearson; Drop: Nash

Kennington Oval, London

England: AW Pearson (Guy's Hospital), L Stokes (Blackheath), William Henry Milton (Marlborough Nomads), AT Michell (Oxford University), EH Nash (Oxford University), WE Collins (St George's Hospital), FR Adams (Richmond), Thomas Batson (Blackheath), EC Cheston (Richmond), Charles Crosse (Oxford University), EC Fraser (Oxford University), HJ Graham (Wimbledon Hornets), WHH Hutchinson (Hull), Henry Lawrence (Richmond) capt., Francis Luscombe (Gipsies), JEH Mackinlay (St George's Hospital), Murray Marshall (Blackheath), ES Perrott (Old Chestonians), Dawson Turner (Richmond), Roger Walker (Manchester)

Ireland: RB Walkington (NIFC), HL Cox (Dublin University), RJ Bell (NIFC), AP Cronyn (Dublin University), R Galbraith (Dublin University), J Myles (Dublin University), EN McIlwaine (NIFC), WS Allen (Wanderers), G Andrews (NIFC), WH Ash (NIFC), M Barlow (Wanderers), BN Casement (Dublin University), A Combe (NIFC), W Gaffikin (Windsor), E Galbraith (Dublin University), FT Hewson (Wanderers), JA McDonald (Methodist College), RM Maginess (Dublin University), G Stack (Dublin University) capt., HD Walsh (Dublin University)

=== Scotland vs. England ===
8 March 1875

Scotland	nil – nil	England

Raeburn Place, Edinburgh

Scotland: WD Brown (Glasgow Academicals) capt., T Chalmers (Glasgow Academicals), Malcolm Cross(Glasgow Academicals), Ninian Finlay (Edinburgh Academicals), HM Hamilton (West of Scotland), John Kennedy Tod (Glasgow Academicals), JR Hay-Gordon (Edinburgh Academicals), Allan Arthur (Glasgow Academicals), JW Dunlop (West of Scotland), AP Finlay (Edinburgh Academicals), George Raphael Fleming (Glasgow Academicals), Gilbert Heron (Glasgow Academicals), RW Irvine (Edinburgh Academicals), A Marshall (Edinburgh Academicals), JAW Mein (Edinburgh Academicals), AG Petrie (Royal HSFP), J Reid (Edinburgh Wanderers), D Robertson (Edinburgh Academicals), A Wood (Royal HSFP)

England: AW Pearson (Blackheath), Louis Birkett (Clapham Rovers), Reg Birkett (Clapham Rovers), S Morse (Marlborough Nomads), AT Michell (Oxford University), WAD Evanson (Civil Service), WE Collins (St George's Hospital), FR Adams (Richmond), James Bush (Clifton), EC Cheston (Richmond), WRB Fletcher (Marlborough Nomads), JSM Genth (Manchester), HJ Graham (Wimbledon Hornets), Edward Kewley (Liverpool), Henry Lawrence (Richmond) capt., Francis Luscombe (Gipsies), Murray Marshall (Blackheath), S Parker (Liverpool), JE Paul (RIE College), Dawson Turner (Richmond)

== Bibliography ==
- Griffiths, John (1982). The Book of English International Rugby 1872-1982. London: Willow Books. ISBN 978-0-00-218006-1.
- Griffiths, John (1987). The Phoenix Book of International Rugby Records. London: Phoenix House. ISBN 0-460-07003-7.
