= John Birkett =

John Birkett may refer to:

- John Birkett (rugby union) (1884–1967), English rugby union player
- John Birkett (surgeon) (1815–1904), English surgeon

== See also ==
- John Burkett (born 1964), American baseball pitcher
