= William Hutchinson =

William, Willie, Willy, Billy or Bill Hutchinson may refer to:

== Politics and law ==
- William Asa Hutchinson (born 1950), governor of Arkansas
- William Hutchinson (Rhode Island judge) (1586–1641), merchant, judge, co-founder of Portsmouth, Rhode Island, and husband of Anne Hutchinson
- William Hutchinson (topographer) (1732–1814), English lawyer and antiquary
- William Alston Hutchinson (1839–1897), Australian politician
- William Easton Hutchinson (1860–1952), Associate Justice of the Kansas Supreme Court
- William Hutchinson (Victorian politician) (1864–1924), member of the Victorian Legislative Assembly, 1902–1920
- William Harold Hutchinson (1870s–1965), British trade unionist and Labour Party activist
- William Hutchinson (Australian politician) (1904–1967), member of the Australian House of Representatives, 1931–1949
- William D. Hutchinson (1932–1995), U.S. federal judge
- Billy Hutchinson (born 1955), Northern Irish politician
- Bill Hutchinson (politician), Canadian politician
- William J.C. Hutchinson Jamaican politician

== Sports ==
=== Association football ===
- Billy Hutchinson (footballer, born 1870) (1870–1943), English footballer for Stoke
- William Hutchinson (footballer), (active 1900s), English footballer
- Billy Hutchinson (1930s footballer) (active 1930s), English footballer for Bournemouth, Darlington, Halifax

=== Rugby ===
- William Hutchinson (rugby, born 1849) (William Henry Heap Hutchinson, 1849–1929), English rugby union footballer who played in the 1870s
- William Hutchinson (rugby, born 1856) (William Charles Hutchinson, 1856–1880), English rugby union footballer who played in the 1870s
- Billy Hutchinson (rugby league) (1913–1994), English rugby league footballer who played in the 1930s and 1940s

=== Other sports ===
- William Hutchinson (bowls) (born 1877), Canadian international lawn bowls player
- Bill Hutchinson (American football) (1916–2008), American football quarterback
- Willie Hutchinson (1921–1992), American baseball player
- Willy Hutchinson (born 1998), Scottish boxer
- William Hutchinson (British Army officer) (1841–1917), British Army officer and cricketer

== Other ==
- William Hutchinson (archdeacon of Cornwall) (16th–17th c.)
- William Hutchinson (archdeacon of Lewes) from 1628 to 1644
- William Hutchinson (privateer) (1716–1801), worked on tides for Liverpool
- William Hutchinson (superintendent) (1772–1846), convict, emancipist, superintendent of the convict settlement at Norfolk Island
- William Nelson Hutchinson (1803–1895), British general
- William Kinsey Hutchinson (1896–1958), American reporter
- William B. Hutchinson (1909–1997), American surgeon and founder of the Fred Hutchinson Cancer Research Center
- William Y. Hutchinson (1916–2006), American philanthropist
- William Hutchinson (art director) (fl. 1937–1976), art director
- William "Billy" Hutchinson (1959–2007), American firefighter killed in the line of duty in the Charleston Sofa Super Store fire

== See also ==
- William Hutchison (disambiguation)
- William Hutcheson (1874–1953), unionist
- Bill Hutchison (baseball) (1859–1926), baseball player often misspelled Hutchinson
- "The Lottery" by Shirley Jackson features a character named Bill Hutchinson
