= Louis Birkett =

English rugby union player (1853–1943)

- Born: Louis Birkett; 1 January 1853 Southwark, London
- Died: 11 April 1943 (aged 90) Barnstaple
- Occupation: Wool Broker Manager

Rugby union career
- Position: Fullback
Senior career
Years	Team	Apps	(Points)
- Clapham Rovers
International career
Years	Team	Apps	(Points)
1875-1877	England	3	

Louis Birkett (1 January 1853 – 11 April 1943) was an English rugby union player who played for Clapham Rovers and was also selected to play for England. He was the younger brother of Reg Birkett and uncle of John Birkett.

== Early life ==
Louis Birkett was born in Southwark, London on 1 January 1853 and baptised at St Saviour, Southwark. His parents were John Birkett (born 1816, Hackney, London) a surgeon, and Lucy Matilda Janson (born 1823 in Tottenham, London). He had a number of brothers and sisters including Reginald (born 1849), Percival (born 1851), Evelyn (born 1864), and Arthur (born 1861). His older brother Reginald was the famed dual code international who scored England's first international try.

== Rugby union career ==
Louis followed his brother into playing for Clapham Rovers. At that club he played both association football and by the rugby code. He was selected in March 1875 to play for England in the Scotland vs England match in Edinburgh and was singled out as a "capital full-back and first-rate drop". His selection meant that he and his brother, Reg, had become the first pair of brothers to have both played for England in the same match. Later that year, the Bryden brothers, Henry and Charles, became the second set of brothers to have played for England (albeit in separate matches) when Charles made his debut - both sets of brothers having come from Clapham Rovers. Louis played twice more for England two seasons later in the Ireland and Scotland encounters of the 1876–77 Home Nations rugby union matches.

== Career and later life ==
Louis was working as a commercial clerk in 1881 and was based at his parental home. He married Agnes Wreford on 26 April 1881 in Otford, Kent and they went on to have three daughters and two sons. The family moved to Chislehurst, Kent and Louis became a Wool Broker's Clerk and later a Manager of the same firm. On 15 July 1930, Louis received the Freedom of the City of London in the Worshipful Company of Ironmongers.

He and his wife Agnes later retired to Barnstaple, Devon where he died on 11 April 1943 having been married to Agnes for over 62 years.
