= Henry Lawrence (rugby union) =

England international rugby union player

Henry Arnold Lawrence
- Born: Henry Arnold Lawrence; 17 March 1848 Lahore, Punjab, British India
- Died: 18 April 1902 (aged 54) Box House, Box, Minchinhampton, Gloucestershire, England, UK
- School: Wellington College, Berkshire
- University: Trinity College, Cambridge

Rugby union career
- Position: Forward
Senior career
Years	Team	Apps	(Points)
- Richmond
International career
Years	Team	Apps	(Points)
1873–1875	England	4	(0)

Henry Arnold Lawrence (17 March 1848 – 18 April 1902) was a rugby union forward who played club rugby for Richmond F.C. and international rugby for England. He was the third captain of the England rugby team.

== Personal life ==
Lawrence was born at Lahore in 1848, the second son of John Lawrence, 1st Baron Lawrence, and his wife Harriette Katherine (née Hamilton). His father was Viceroy of India between 1864 and 1869. Lawrence was educated at Wellington College, Berkshire, before matriculating to Trinity College, Cambridge, in 1866. He was a Director of the London office of the Ottoman Bank. He spent his later life in Box, Gloucestershire, where he died on 18 April 1902, aged 54.

== Rugby career ==
Lawrence first came to note as a rugby player when he represented Richmond. In 1873, Lawrence was selected to play for the England national rugby team, in their third match in an encounter against Scotland; the game ended in a draw. Lawrence was reselected for the next encounter with Scotland the next season, and in 1875 he was given the captaincy of his country, in the team's first ever match against the newly formed Ireland team. His fourth and final game saw Lawrence retain the captaincy for the 1875 encounter with Scotland.

== Family ==
In 1876, he married Constance Charlotte Davies (died 1929), daughter of the Reverend George Davies, Rector of Kelsale, in Suffolk. They had three sons, John Dalhousie (1887–1900), Malcolm Eyton (born 1889), and Christopher Hal (born 1893), and three daughters, Constance Letitia (1881–1946), Phyllis May (1882–1956), and Mary Paolina (1886–1963).

Second Lieutenant Christopher Hal Lawrence (1893–1914), of the 2nd Battalion of the King's Royal Rifle Corps, educated at Eton College and Trinity College, Cambridge, was killed by a sniper in the trenches during action on 13 October 1914, during World War I, less than two weeks after arriving in France. The location of his grave is unknown and he is commemorated at the La Ferté-sous-Jouarre memorial.

Lieutenant Malcolm Lawrence (1889–1915), was educated at Eton and lived in Canada for four years before returning to Great Britain and being commissioned in the 6th Battalion of the King's Royal Rifles in November 1914. He was killed in action on 10 January 1915. The location of his grave was unknown until his remains were discovered along with several others during construction excavations in 1928. The remains were interred at the Arras Road Cemetery, Roclincourt, France.

Sporting positions
Preceded by Alfred Hamersley	English National Rugby Union Captain; 1875	Succeeded by Francis Luscombe
