= Charles Scrope Hutchinson =

Major-General Charles Scrope Hutchinson CB (8 August 1826 – 29 February 1912) was Chief Inspecting Officer for Railways from 1892 to 1895.

== Family ==
Hutchinson was born in Hythe, Kent, son of Scrope Hutchinson, M.D. He was educated at University College School from 1839 to 1841.

He was married on 6 January 1852 in Gibraltar to Christina Ross, youngest daughter of William Ross of Gibraltar. The children from this marriage included:

- Christina Hutchinson
- Anne Eliza Hutchinson (7 December 1853 – June 1939)
- William Charles Hutchinson (c. 1855–1880)
- Mary Isabel Hutchinson

== Career ==
He obtained a commission in the Royal Engineers in 1843, and became a colonel in 1876, and retired in the same year with the honorary rank of Major General.

From 1867 he was Inspector of Railways for the Board of Trade and was appointed Chief Inspecting Officer in 1892. During his time with the Board of Trade he inspected the Tay Rail Bridge and Forth Bridge.

Major-General Hutchinson was elected an Associate of the Institution of Civil Engineers on 3 March 1874. He was made a Companion of the Order of the Bath in 1890.

He died at Blackheath, London in 1912. A memorial plaque was erected in St James' Church, Kidbrooke.
