= Arthur Edward Osmaston =

Naturalist and forest officer

Arthur Edward Osmaston (4 March 1885– 30 June 1972) was a forest officer and naturalist in India. He studied at the Royal Indian Engineering College, Cooper's Hill, and joined the Indian Forest Department in the United Provinces.

Osmaston was the fifteenth child of John Osmaston who had moved from Derbyshire to Sussex. Many of the children joined the colonial services. He was a brother of Bertram Beresford Osmaston of the foret service and L. S. Osmaston who had served in Bombay. Osmaston went to Elizabeth College, Guernsey, and Bedford Grammar School before joining Emanuel College, Cambridge. He joined Coopers Hill, studying forestry and went to India in 1907 to work in the United Provinces. He taught for two years at the Indian Forest College. He left India in 1933. He was a keen outdoorsman and naturalist. In 1927 he published "A forest flora of Kumaon" and was involved in stocking trout in some Himalayan streams and lakes. He married Esther (Essie) in 1922 and they had two sons, Miles and Henry. He retired to the Elms, Wisborough Green, Sussex. He served as J.P. and worked in the Home Guard and Civil Defense. During his thirty years of service, he studied the birds and flora of the region and wrote numerous papers in the Journal of the Bombay Natural History Society. His collection of bird specimens was given to Hugh Whistler in 1931 and is now in the Natural History Museum at Tring.

== Publications ==
- Osmaston A.E. (1929): On the forest types in India. Acta Forestalia Fennica 34(12):3-7. doi:10.14214/aff.7225
- Osmaston, A E (1921): Note on the nidification and habits of some birds in British Garhwal. JBNHS. 28(1):140-160.
- Osmaston, A E (1916): Curious habits of Wood-peckers in the Kumaon hills. JBNHS. 24(2):363-366.
- Osmaston, A E (1913): The birds of Gorakhpur. JBNHS. 22(3):532-549.
- Osmaston, A E (1912): Eggs of the Large Hawk-Cuckoo Hierococcyx sparverioides. JBNHS. 21(4):1330-1331.
