= Pinhey =

Pinhey is a surname. Notable people with the surname include:

- Don Pinhey (1930–2014), Canadian football player
- Elliot Pinhey (1910–1999), entomologist
- Hamnett Kirkes Pinhey (1784–1857), Canadian landowner and politician
- Hamnett Pinhey Hill (1877–1942), Ontario lawyer and political figure
- Hugh Theodore Pinhey (1858–1953), British soldier and one of the last surviving veterans of the Second Anglo-Afghan War
