= Donald James Sim McLeod =

- Born: 1845
- Died: 1922 (aged 76–77)
- Military career
- Branch: British Indian Army
- Rank: General
- Units: 3rd Madras Lancers; 28th Light Cavalry
- Awards: CB; KCIE; DSO

General Sir Donald James Sim McLeod (1845 – 1922) was a senior officer of the British Indian Army. He served for more than four decades in India and Burma, holding a number of important staff and command appointments and eventually attaining the rank of general.

== Early life ==
McLeod was born in 1845, the son of General William Couperus McLeod of the Madras Army and Jane Ann McLeod. He was educated at Kensington School in London before entering military service.

Among his siblings was Norman Frederick McLeod, who later became an engineer in British India and an international rugby player for the England national rugby union team.

== Military career ==
McLeod entered the Madras Army in 1861. Early in his career he served as aide-de-camp in Madras from 1864 to 1867.

He subsequently held a series of staff appointments in the Indian Army. From 1870 to 1876 he served as deputy assistant quartermaster-general at Madras, and from 1878 to 1883 as assistant quartermaster-general. In 1883 he became deputy quartermaster-general, a position he held until 1889.

During the British annexation of Upper Burma he served as deputy quartermaster-general in Burma from 1886 to 1887.

From 1890 to 1893 he commanded the 3rd Madras Lancers. He later became colonel of the 28th Light Cavalry and continued to hold senior commands within the Indian Army.

In the later stages of his career he commanded British forces in Burma and was promoted lieutenant-general in 1903. He retired from active service in 1906 and subsequently received the honorary rank of general.

== Honours ==
McLeod was appointed a Companion of the Order of the Bath (CB) and later a Knight Commander of the Order of the Indian Empire (KCIE). He was also awarded the Distinguished Service Order (DSO) for his military service.

== Family ==
In 1887 McLeod married Camilla, daughter of Major J. Nicholas.

== Death ==
McLeod died in 1922 after a long career in the service of the British Indian Army.
