= RIE College RFC =

Defunct English rugby union club, based in Egham, Surrey

(England) RIE College RFC
- Full name: Royal Indian Engineering College Rugby Football Club
- Union: Rugby Football Union
- Founded: 1871
- Disbanded: 1903; 123 years ago
- Location: Coopers Hill, Egham, Surrey, England

Royal Indian Engineering College RFC was a nineteenth-century and early twentieth-century Surrey-based rugby union club, who were attached to Royal Indian Engineering College from 1871 to 1903.

== Formation ==
The estate of Coopers Hill in Surrey was bought by the India Office in 1870; and a college was built to train civil engineers to be sent to India. The college was officially opened in 1872.

The rugby club was formed in 1871. In its day, the college's rugby union team, referred to by its opponents as "Cooper's Hill", was one of the most prominent rugby clubs in England.

By the 1890s, the team was deemed of medium strength, and a long way behind the form of its heyday. This was put down to boys leaving school earlier than they had previously, thus the team became composed of men who were physically smaller in stature and physique than their predecessors.

The engineering college closed in 1906.

== Notable former players ==
=== England internationalists ===
The following former RIE College players have represented England at full international level.

- (England) Stephen Finney
- (England) E. F. Dawson
- (England) Henry Marsh
- (England) N. F. McLeod
- (England) Josiah Edward Paul
- (England) W. C. Hutchinson
- (England) P. L. A. Price
- (England) F. D. Fowler

=== Scotland internationalists ===
The following former RIE College players have represented Scotland at full international level.

- (Scotland) John Davidson
- (Scotland) David McFarlan
- (Scotland) William Holms
- (Scotland) Alexander Bisset
