= Henry Fowler (rugby) =

England international rugby union player

- Full name: Richard Henry Fowler

Rugby union career
- Position: Forwards
Senior career
Years	Team	Apps	(Points)
–	Leeds		
–	Yorkshire Wanderers		
International career
Years	Team	Apps	(Points)
1877	England	1	(0)

Richard Henry Fowler was an English rugby union footballer who played in the 1870s. He played at representative level for England, and at club level for Leeds, and Yorkshire Wanderers, as a forward, e.g. front row, lock, or back row. Prior to Tuesday 27 August 1895, Leeds was a rugby union club.

== Playing career ==
Henry Fowler won a cap for England while at Leeds in the 1876–77 Home Nations rugby union match against Ireland.
