= Edinburgh Collegiate School =

Edinburgh Collegiate School was located at 27/28 Charlotte Square, Edinburgh. The school was established in 1868.

== Notable former pupils ==
- Thomas Hastie Bryce (1862–1946), anatomist, medical author and archaeologist
- W. K. Burton (1856–1899), engineer, photographer and photography writer, who lived most of his career in Meiji period Japan
- Henry Cowan (1862–1932), Liberal Member of Parliament (MP) 1906–22, Unionist MP 1923–29
- William James Cullen, Lord Cullen (1859–1941), lawyer and judge, Sheriff of Fife and Kinross, Senator of the College of Justice
- Sir Frederick Gebbie (1871–1939), British civil engineer in India
- Archibald Alexander Gordon (1867–1949), British soldier who served as attaché to the Military Household of King Albert I of Belgium during World War I
- Field Marshal Douglas Haig, 1st Earl Haig (1861–1928), British senior officer during the First World War
- Henry Halcro Johnston (1856–1939), Scottish botanist, physician, rugby union international
- Alfred Edward Moffat (1863–1950), Scottish musician, composer and collector of music
- Sir James Thorburn (1864–1929), British colonial Governor of the Gold Coast 1910–12
