= Alexander Bisset =

Scotland international rugby union player

- Born: Alexander Anderson Bisset; 18 October 1883 Duns, Scotland
- Died: 14 February 1927 (aged 43) Moffat, Scotland

Rugby union career
- Position: Half back
Amateur team(s)
Years	Team	Apps	(Points)
- Edinburgh Wanderers
- RIE College
- London Scottish
- Edinburgh Wanderers
Provincial / State sides
Years	Team	Apps	(Points)
1904	Provinces District		
1904	Anglo-Scots		
International career
Years	Team	Apps	(Points)
1904	Scotland	1	(0)

Alexander Bisset (18 October 1883 – 14 February 1927) was a Scotland international rugby union player.

== Rugby Union career ==
=== Amateur career ===
He played for Edinburgh Wanderers in 1902. He played for the Edinburgh Wanderers (so termed but a few Edinburgh Academicals players also found their way into the Wanderers line up) side to face Canada in December 1902.

Bisset then played rugby union for RIE College at Cooper's Hill.

He, later at the end of 1904, played for London Scottish.

By 1905, Bisset was back in Scotland playing for Edinburgh Wanderers again.

=== Provincial career ===
He was capped by Provinces District in January 1904, playing against the Cities District.

The Dundee Evening Telegraph of 19 January 1904 noting:

The surprise packet here was Bisset of Cooper's Hill, who, called in as practically an emergency man, gave a splendid exhibition.

Later in December that year, Bisset played for the Anglo-Scots against the South of Scotland District.

Previewing the 1905 Provinces versus Cities match, Bisset was noted as a doubtful starter as he had played in a number of recent matches, in the Scottish Referee newspaper of 13 January 1905. They termed Bisset a 'terror for his size'.

=== International career ===
He was capped just the once for the Scotland international side, turning out against Wales in 1904.

== Civil Service career ==
Anderson sat a competitive examination on 30 June 1903. The newspapers such as the London Evening Standard of 12 August 1903; and the Lahore Civil and Military Gazette of 3 September 1903 both noting that Anderson was in the top 9 places; thus securing him one of 9 available posts - 8 in India and 1 in Sudan. Anderson had the third highest marks with 9902. The appointment of Anderson and the 8 others was dependent on passing a medical. Anderson's post, which given he ended up in Sudan it seems very likely he then obtained, was for the Sudan Forest Department.

He went into the Sudan Government Service.

== Retirement ==
Bisset retired in Moffat, Dumfries-shire. He found himself in the Sunday Post newspaper of 12 July 1925 when he was convicted of reckless driving.

"We are criticised for being far too lenient and not sending people to prison in cases of this kind," said Sheriff Campion Dumfries' Sheriff Court in imposing a fine of £20 and suspending the driving license of Mr A. A. Bisset, retired civil servant, Bankfoot, Beechgrove, Moffat, who was convicted of reckless motor driving. It was alleged that on 3rd June, on the Glasgow-Carlisle Road, opposite the lands of Dinwoodiegreen, Applegarth, near Lockerbie, while under the influence of drink, ha drove a motor car recklessly, and caused to collide with, and damage, another motor car driven Muriel Helen Baird, 9 Whittinghame Drive, Kelvinside, Glasgow.

== Family ==
He was born to John Bisset (1848–1928) and Eliza Anderson (1846–1919). John Bisset was a bank manager for the Bank of Scotland, first in Edinburgh and then in Glasgow.

As well as Alexander they had a son John Stormont Bisset (1882–1961) and a daughter Jessie Bisset. John Stormont Bisset went into the Royal Engineers and became a Lieutenant Colonel.

== Death ==
He is buried in the Grange cemetery in Edinburgh.
