= Frederick Sprott =

English cricketer and engineer (1863–1943)

Personal information
- Full name: Frederick Laurence Sprott
- Born: 10 July 1863; Shrewsbury, Shropshire, England
- Died: 24 March 1943 (aged 79); Roydon, Norfolk, England
- Batting: Left-handed
- Role: Wicket-keeper

Domestic team information
- Years: Team
- 1892/93–1914/15: Europeans
- 1902/03: Bombay

Career statistics
Competition	First-class
Matches	25
Runs scored	450
Batting average	13.63
100s/50s	–/1
Top score	68
Catches/stumpings	19/13
- Source: ESPNcricinfo, 9 December 2022

Sir Frederick Laurence Sprott (10 July 1863 — 24 March 1943) was an English first-class cricketer and engineer.

The son of James Sprott, he was born at Shrewsbury in July 1863. He was educated at Shrewsbury School, from where he attended the Royal Indian Engineering College. From there, he went to British India where he joined the Public Works Department in 1884, being appointed an assistant engineer in 1885 and executive engineer in 1897. Sprott was principal and professor of engineering at the College of Science in Poona from 1899 to 1903. Appointed a superintendent engineer in 1904, he served on the Indus River Commission from 1904 to 1908 and following his time with the commission he was a sanitary engineer for the Government of Bombay. Sprott was appointed deputy chairman of the Bombay Port Trust in 1909 and became chairman the following year, an appointment which lasted until 1918. He was Knighted by George V in June 1914.

Beginning in August 1892, he forged a successful career in first-class cricket in India, making 25 appearances up to 1914. 24 of these came for the Europeans cricket team in the Bombay Presidency Matches, with a further appearance coming in 1902 for Bombay against the touring Oxford University Authentics cricket team. Playing as a wicket-keeper, took 19 catches and made 13 stumpings in his 25 first-class matches. As a batsman, he scored 450 runs at an average of 13.63; he made one half century, a score of 68.

Sprott moved to Kenya Colony in 1919, where he bought a small property called Cooper's Hill. He was an elected member of the Legislative Council of Kenya and sat on the Kenya Land Settlement Advisory Board. Sprott died in England in March 1943 at Roydon, Norfolk. He was survived by his wife, Amy Graham Dame, whom he had married in 1888. They had two sons, one of whom died in the First World War during the Mesopotamian campaign.
