= Henry Marsh (rugby union) =

England international rugby union player

- Born: Henry Marsh; 8 September 1850 Ireland
- Died: 25 April 1939 (aged 88) (registered in) Amersham
- School: Kingstown School, Ireland
- University: Royal Indian Engineering College

Rugby union career
- Position: Forward
Amateur team(s)
Years	Team	Apps	(Points)
-	RIE College RFC		
International career
Years	Team	Apps	(Points)
1873	England	1	

Henry Marsh was a rugby union international who represented England in 1873.

== Early life ==
Henry Marsh was born on 8 September 1850 in Ireland, the third son of Francis Marsh, a J. P. of Spring Mount, Queen's County. He attended Kingstown School, Ireland and went on to study at Royal Indian Engineering College at Cooper's Hill. He was there from 1871 to 1874 and obtained 1st class honours in Mathematics.

== Career ==
After obtaining his 1st class honours in Mathematics, Marsh joined the India Public Works Department as an Assistant Engineer in 1874. He became an Executive Engineer in 1881; rising to a Super-intending Engineer in 1897 and Chief Engineer and Secretary, in 1901. He became a member of the Member, Legislative Council, Uttar Pradesh from 1903 to 1905 and was eventually Secretary to Government (Irrigation Branch). His work in conjunction with the development of Irrigation in the Ganges and Jumna systems led to his being thanked by the Government of Uttar Pradesh He was later re-employed by the Government of India as Consulting Engineer for Irrigation in Central India.

Among his publications were: Some Indirect Benefits of Irrigation not generally recognised and Protection of Irrigation; Investigations in Central India.

He retired to England, becoming a member of the East India United Service Club.

== Rugby union career ==
Marsh made his international debut on 3 March 1873 at Hamilton Crescent, Glasgow in the Scotland vs England match.
