= Ernest Dawson (rugby union) =

Ernest Frederick Dawson
- Born: May 10, 1858 Charlottetown, Prince Edward Island, Canada
- Died: April 7, 1904 (aged 45) Hampstead, London, England
- School: Royal Indian Engineering College
- Occupation: Civil engineer

Rugby union career
- Position: Forward
Amateur team(s)
| Years | Team | Apps | (Points) |
| – | RIE College RFC | | |
International career
| Years | Team | Apps | (Points) |
| 1878 | England | 1 | (0) |

Ernest Frederick Dawson (10 May 1858 – 7 April 1904) was a Canadian-born rugby union forward who played international rugby for England in 1878. He later pursued a career as a civil engineer in the Indian Public Works Department in British India, eventually becoming a superintendent engineer in the Bombay Presidency.

== Early life ==
Dawson was born on 10 May 1858 in Charlottetown, Prince Edward Island, Canada. He was the son of William Eddison Dawson (1829–1902), a native of Leeds, Yorkshire, England, and Ann Ferrant Compton (1833–1880), who was born on Prince Edward Island.

In 1875 Dawson was admitted by open competitive examination to the Royal Indian Engineering College at Cooper's Hill, Surrey, which trained engineers for service in the Public Works Department of British India.

== Rugby career ==
While studying at Cooper's Hill, Dawson played rugby union as a forward for the college team. Contemporary match reports list him as 'E. F. Dawson' in the Royal Indian Engineering College side playing against leading clubs such as Blackheath and Richmond.

Dawson was selected for the England team and won a single international cap in the match against Ireland at Lansdowne Road in Dublin on 11 March 1878, which ended in a draw.

== Engineering career ==
After completing his training, Dawson joined the Indian Public Works Department and worked in the irrigation branch in the Bombay Presidency.

By the early 1880s he was serving as Assistant Engineer in the irrigation department in the Dharwar district. In 1884 he was recorded as Assistant Engineer for irrigation at Dharwar in a proposal for membership of the Institution of Civil Engineers.

Dawson later rose through the ranks of the Public Works Department. In 1897 he was promoted to Executive Engineer, 1st Grade and was granted eighteen months' furlough. By the time of his death he had attained the position of Superintendent Engineer in the Bombay Public Works Department and was a member of the Institution of Civil Engineers.

== Family ==
On 8 March 1882 Dawson married Alison ("Ailie") Steell in Bombay (now Mumbai). She was the daughter of John Steell, a member of the Institution of Civil Engineers, and the granddaughter of the Scottish sculptor Sir John Steell, who served as sculptor to Queen Victoria and was president of the Royal Scottish Academy.

Their children included:

- Elizabeth May Dawson (born 1883, died 1883 in Igatpuri)
- Ernest Frederick Steell Dawson (born 1884, Bombay Presidency)
- William John Steell Dawson (born 1888, Dharwar)
- Minnie Alison Margaret "Madge" Dawson (born 1890, Dharwar)

== Death ==
Dawson died on 7 April 1904 at 25 Carlingford Road in Hampstead, London. Probate of his estate was granted in London on 30 July 1904 to Arthur Hamilton King acting on behalf of his widow.
