= Edward Innes Pocock =

Scotland international rugby union player

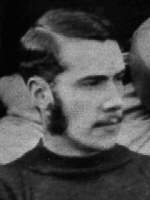
- Born: Edward Innes Pocock; 3 December 1855 Clifton, England
- Died: 14 January 1905 (aged 49) Salisbury, Rhodesia
- School: Clifton College
- Occupation(s): Soldier; Mining Commissioner

Rugby union career
- Position: Three-quarters
Amateur team(s)
Years	Team	Apps	(Points)
1873–76	Clifton		
1876–78	Edinburgh Wanderers		
Provincial / State sides
Years	Team	Apps	(Points)
1876–77	Edinburgh District		
International career
Years	Team	Apps	(Points)
1877	Scotland	2	(0)

Edward Innes Pocock (3 December 1855 – 14 January 1905) was a Scotland international rugby union player. Playing at three-quarters, Pocock gained two caps for Scotland while representing Edinburgh Wanderers at club level. A soldier by profession, he served in Cecil Rhodes' Pioneer Column. On leaving the army he became a civil servant holding several posts as Mining Commissioner in various districts of Rhodesia.

== Early history ==
Pocock was born in Clifton, Bristol in 1855, the son of Rev. Nicholas Pocock and his wife Edith. Pocock's Great-grandfather was marine artist Captain Nicholas Pocock, while his younger brother Reginald Innes Pocock was a notable zoologist. Pocock was educated at Clifton College from 1872 to 1875 and after leaving school he joined the British Army, being posted to Edinburgh.

== Rugby Union career ==
=== Amateur career ===
Pocock played rugby while still a schoolboy, and in his final year he represented Clifton College. In 1873 he played his first game for local team Clifton Rugby Football Club, but on his posting to Edinburgh, during the 1876 – 77 rugby season, he turned out for Edinburgh Wanderers.

=== Provincial career ===
Pocock was selected for Edinburgh District. He played in the Inter-City match of December 1876 against Glasgow District.

He played against East of Scotland District in January 1877. Scoring a try for Edinburgh from a loose maul, it was converted by G. Q. Paterson.

=== International career ===
In 1877, while playing for Wanderers, Pocock was approached by the Scottish Rugby Union to represent Scotland in the 1877 Test match against Ireland. The Scottish Rugby Union needed to gain permission from the Rugby Football Union to play Pocock due to his nationality. Although Pocock was a quick player and scored many tries at club level, he was supported by a very strong Wanderers pack; at international level he was far more exposed. Pocock had a very good game for Scotland against Ireland, scoring a try on this debut match which Scotland won 6–0. Pocock was reselected for the very next game, played in Edinburgh against England just a month later. Despite a win for Scotland from a solitary dropped goal from Malcolm Cross, Pocock had a terrible match, and at one point was moved out of his three-quarter position and into the forwards. Pocock, never a favourite with the Scottish spectators due to being English, was never selected for Scotland again.

== Military career ==
In 1880, Pocock was posted to Brighton into the cavalry regiment, the 16th Lancers. That year he was promoted from Assistant Commissary to Deputy Assistant Commissary-General. From Brighton he was posted to Aldershot and later abroad to India and the West Indies. In 1885 he was promoted to the honorary rank of captain. In 1888 he joined the newly formed Royal Army Service Corps, retaining his rank of honorary captain. Stationed initially in Dublin, he was later posted in Claremont, Cape Town in South Africa. He resigned his commission in 1890 to join Cecil Rhodes' newly formed Pioneer Column, and was appointed to C Troop on 18 April. He was part of the Pioneer Column Expedition that annexed Mashonaland, but before the column left Macloutsie in Bechuanaland on 28 June, he was re-appointed to B Troop.

== Later life in Africa ==
The Pioneer Corps was disbanded on 1 October 1890, and the members of the company were offered a parcel of land to farm, which included mining rights. Pocock took up the option and acquired a farm in one of the richest farming areas just outside Salisbury. Despite this, Pocock later wrote to his mother saying he had given up farming, and had instead gone into a gold mining business with an O. R. Armstrong.

After selling his farmland to Sir Francis Newton, Pocock moved from varying jobs to another. In 1893 he prospected and developed mining properties in the Lomagundi District, but that year he was hospitalised in Salisbury with an abscess on his knee. While recovering he joined the Civil Service and organised Salisbury's Queen's Birthday Gymkhana of 1894. Pocock was later made a mining commissioner, and was present when Trooper Cooper of the British South Africa Company's Police was fatally stabbed while collecting hut tax. He was appointed Gwelo District Mines Inspector in February 1896, and in March 1898 he was appointed Mining Commissioner to replace A.J. Jameson who had been murdered by locals the previous June.

During an uprising in 1896, Pocock was made captain of the Gwelo District Volunteers, and between September and October 1896 he was placed in command of Fort Gibb. He was stabbed in the arm by a spear during a conflict on 24 October 1896. He took leave in January 1897 returning to England, and was still in the country for his father's death in March. Pocock returned to Rhodesia in August 1897. In 1897 he was made mining commissioner of Lomagundi District, though he resigned from the Civil Service in 1901. Pocock was then hired by United Excelsior Mines, and was placed in charge of the Alliance Mine in the Abercorn District. Mining operations ceased at the mine in 1903, but he remained living at the property.

Throughout his time in Rhodesia, Pocock suffered from bouts of malaria. These became more and more serious until he contracted black water fever. Due to a flooded river, he was prevented from reaching the hospital for three days, and on arrival he was seriously ill. He died at the hospital from pneumonia and was buried at Pioneer Cemetery in Salisbury.

== Bibliography ==
- Edwards, J. A. (1962). "Rhodesiana, Publication No. 7" (PDF). The Rhodesiana Society.
