= Stephen Finney =

England international rugby union player

- Born: 8 September 1852 Marylebone, London, England
- Died: 1 March 1924 (aged 71) (registered in) Kensington
- School: Clifton College
- University: Royal Indian Engineering College

Rugby union career
- Position: Halfback
Senior career
Years	Team	Apps	(Points)
- RIE College RFC
–	Calcutta		
International career
Years	Team	Apps	(Points)
1872–1873	England	2	

Sir Stephen Finney CIE (8 September 1852 – 1 March 1924) was a rugby union international who represented England from 1872 to 1873.

== Early life ==
Stephen Finney was born on 8 September 1852 in Marylebone. He was educated at Clifton College and the Royal Indian Engineering College, Cooper's Hill. As well as rugby, Finney also played cricket at Clifton and was said to have been one of the school's finest players.

== Rugby union career ==
Finney played his rugby in the 1870s in a newly found club close to his working area Crewe Britannia which was short lived, closing in the 1880s. Currently in that area from 1922 is the present Crewe & Nantwich RUFC. Before his days at Crewe Finney made his international debut on 5 February 1872 at The Oval in the England vs Scotland match. Of the two matches he played for his national side he was on the winning side on one occasions. He played his final match for England on 3 March 1873 at Hamilton Crescent, Glasgow in the Scotland vs England match. Of his prowess on the rugby field it was written after his death that "among those qualified to judge he is considered to have had no superior as a fearless and determined halfback". He also appeared with Calcutta FC, oldest rugby and football club in Asia.

== Career ==
Finney entered the service of the Indian Public Works Department in 1874 and served as assistant and district engineer for four years. He then joined the administrative branch of the Railway Department and stayed there until 1891.
