= Frederick Campbell Rose =

Scottish civil engineer

Frederick Campbell Rose CSI (1865 – 18 July 1946) was a Scottish civil engineer who spent most of his career in India.

Rose was born in Elgin and educated at Trinity College, Glenalmond and the Royal Indian Engineering College. He joined the Indian Public Works Department in 1886 and was posted to the Irrigation Branch in the Punjab, where he spent most of his career, becoming a leading authority on irrigation. In 1916 he was appointed Secretary of the Public Works Department, which carried with it membership of the Viceroy's Legislative Council.

He retired from Indian service in 1919 to take up the post of chief engineer of river improvements in the Chili Province of Northern China, finally retiring in 1927.

Rose was appointed Companion of the Order of the Star of India (CSI) in the 1920 New Year Honours.
