= William Couperus McLeod =

- Born: 16 September 1805; Pondicherry, French India
- Died: 4 April 1880 (aged 74) Gloucester Gardens, London, England
- Branch: Madras Army
- Rank: General
- Conflicts: First Anglo-Burmese War

General William Couperus McLeod (16 September 1805 – 4 April 1880) was a British Indian Army officer of the Madras Army and an early explorer of the interior regions of mainland Southeast Asia. He served during the First Anglo-Burmese War and later undertook a diplomatic and exploratory mission in 1836–1837 to the Tai (Shan) states, travelling through territories including Chiang Mai, Kengtung, and Jinghong. His journey produced one of the earliest European accounts of the interior regions linking Burma, Siam and southwestern China.

== Early life ==
McLeod was born on 16 September 1805 at Pondicherry, then part of French India. He later entered the service of the East India Company after being nominated to a cadetship in the Madras Army. In May 1822 he returned to India to begin active service as a young officer in the company's forces.

== Military career ==
McLeod was first posted to the 15th Madras Native Infantry and later transferred to the 30th Madras Native Infantry. During the First Anglo-Burmese War (1824–1826) he participated in several major operations, including the attack and capture of Donabew in March 1825, during which the Burmese commander Maha Bandula was killed. He was also present at the engagement before Prome in December 1825 and was slightly wounded during the attack on Syriam in February 1826.

In 1829 McLeod was attached to the Commissariat Department, where he became involved in frontier administration and diplomatic affairs connected with British relations with Burma and neighbouring territories.

His career spanned the transition from the East India Company’s presidency armies to the British Indian Army following the transfer of power to the British Crown after the Indian Rebellion of 1857.

== Boundary negotiations and surveying ==
During the early 1830s McLeod took part in British efforts to resolve a boundary dispute between the Burmese kingdom and the state of Manipur. The issue concerned the status of the Kabaw Valley, a contested region between Burma and its neighbours. British representatives were sent to negotiate with Burmese officials at the court of Ava, and McLeod accompanied one of these missions.

During these travels he conducted surveys and prepared a map of the region between the Irrawaddy River and the Chindwin River. His work was favourably reported to the colonial authorities and received official commendation.

In November 1834 he was appointed junior assistant to the Commissioner of the Tenasserim provinces, then a recently acquired British territory along the Burmese coast.

== Mission to the Tai states (1836–1837) ==
In 1836 McLeod was selected by the Commissioner of Tenasserim, Edward A. Blundell, to undertake a diplomatic and exploratory journey into the interior of the Indochinese Peninsula. The purpose of the mission was to establish contact with the rulers of the Tai principalities and investigate potential trade routes linking British Burma with southern China.

McLeod began the journey in December 1836 and travelled through several Tai states, including Chiang Mai, Kengtung and Jinghong (then known as Kiang-Hung). These states were important centres in regional trade networks connecting Burma, Siam and the Chinese province of Yunnan. During his journey he collected geographical observations and recorded the latitude of Kiang-Hung, which later corresponded closely with measurements taken by subsequent explorers.

McLeod attempted to proceed further north into China but permission to cross the frontier was refused by local authorities. He therefore returned by the same route and arrived back in Moulmein in May 1837.

The expedition nevertheless provided one of the earliest European descriptions of the interior Tai states. For several decades McLeod's journey remained one of the principal European sources of geographical and political information about the Shan states until later French exploration of the Mekong basin in the 1860s.

== Later career ==
McLeod continued to serve in the Burmese provinces for several years. In 1847 he was transferred to Orissa as principal assistant to an official charged with suppressing the practice of human sacrifice among certain hill tribes.

He subsequently commanded the 30th, 29th and 40th Madras Native Infantry regiments. In 1859 he was appointed brigadier in command of the Malabar and Canara districts. Three years later he assumed command of the Nagpur force.

In 1863 McLeod returned to Burma as brigadier-general commanding the Pegu division. The following year he was transferred to command the Ceded Districts of the Madras Presidency, a position he held until 1868.

He was promoted to the rank of general on 1 October 1877.

McLeod retired from active service in 1877 under the army's superannuation system after reaching the age of seventy.

== Family ==
McLeod married Jane Ann McLeod on 28 December 1840 in Calcutta, Bengal. She was the daughter of Donald McLeod, Inspector-General of Hospitals in British India.

The couple had ten children:

- William Sim McLeod (1841–1888), lieutenant-colonel in the Madras Staff Corps and superintendent of the Central Jail at Vellore.
- Sir Donald James Sim McLeod (1845–1922), a general in the British Indian Army.
- Arthur Dyer McLeod (26 April 1849 – 12 February 1850), born and died in Cuttack, Bengal.
- Duncan Roderick McLeod (4 August 1851 – 26 July 1855), born in Cuttack and buried in Moulmein, Burma.
- Catharine Jane McLeod (baptised 13 July 1853 at St James, Paddington, London).
- Arthur John McLeod (born 4 August 1854), baptised at St James, Paddington, London.
- Norman Frederick McLeod (1856–1921), an engineer in British India who also represented England in international rugby union.
- Charles Eldred McLeod (1858–1899), a solicitor admitted to the Freedom of the City of London in 1886.
- Reginald George MacQueen McLeod (1859–1910), a lieutenant-colonel in the Royal Artillery who served in the Second Boer War.
- Walter Alexander McLeod (21 February 1861 – 26 March 1862), born at Cannanore and buried at Coonoor.

== Death ==
McLeod died on 4 April 1880 at his residence at 62 Gloucester Gardens in London. Probate of his estate was granted on 3 June 1880 to his widow Jane Ann McLeod.
