= William Hutchison =

William Hutchison may refer to:

- William Hutchison (New Zealand politician) (1820–1905), member of the New Zealand House of Representatives and mayor of Wellington
- William Hutchison (pastoralist) (1841–1914), horse breeder and pastoralist in the South-East of South Australia
- William H. Hutchison (1843–1919), mill owner and political figure in Ontario
- Bill Hutchison (baseball) (William Forrest Hutchison, 1859–1926), American baseball pitcher
- William Hutchison (MP for Glasgow Kelvingrove) (1870–1924), MP for Glasgow Kelvingrove, 1922–1924
- William Ramsay Hutchison (1889–1918), Scottish rugby union player
- William Oliphant Hutchison (1889–1970), artist, president of the Royal Scottish Academy
- William Hutchison (MP for Romford) (1904–1975), actor and MP for Romford, 1931–1935
- Bill Hutchison (William Henry Hutchison, 1923–1982), Australian rules footballer
- Willie Hutchison (1944–2005), American singer

== See also ==
- William Hutchinson (disambiguation)
- William Hutcheson (1874–1953), unionist
