= Frank Fowler (rugby union) =

England international rugby union player

- Full name: Frank Dashwood Fowler
- Born: 16 August 1855 Newbury, England
- Died: 14 November 1940 (aged 85) Newbury, England

Rugby union career
- Position: Forward
Amateur team(s)
Years	Team	Apps	(Points)
–	RIE College RFC		
International career
Years	Team	Apps	(Points)
1878–79	England	2	(0)

Frank Dashwood Fowler (16 August 1855 – 14 November 1940) was an English international rugby union player.

Fowler attended the Royal Indian Engineering College and played for their rugby team known as "Cooper's Hill". He was capped twice as a forward for England, with both matches coming against Scotland, in 1878 and 1879.

Some time after finishing with rugby, Fowler spent a period of his life in India working on the railways.

== See also ==
- List of England national rugby union players
