= George Coles (Kent cricketer) =

Indian-born English cricketer

George Edward Coles (11 February 1851 – 21 June 1903) was an Indian-born English amateur cricketer who played for Kent County Cricket Club. He was born in Ratnagiri in British India in 1851, the son of George and Letitia Coles. He grew up in India until he was sent to King's College School in London. He went on to study at the Royal Indian Civil Engineering College at Cooper's Hill near Egham in Surrey.

Coles made his debut for Kent in 1873 against Sussex at Lord's in the only match which took place in the "County Championship Cup", an experimental competition organised by Marylebone Cricket Club (MCC). On a pitch that Wisden reported as "dangerously bad", Coles took six wickets in the Sussex first innings and four in the second as he "repeatedly struck the batsmen" and "battered the batsmen into submission". He made one further appearance for Kent against Surrey later in the same season and played in one minor match for the Gentlemen of Kent against I Zingari during the same year's Canterbury Cricket Week. He lived in Tunbridge Wells and played some cricket for Tunbridge Wells Cricket Club and Bluemantle's.

Coles returned to India soon after his summer of cricket and worked in the Indian Public Works Department throughout his life. He married in West Bengal in 1893 and had one son. Coles died at Naini Tal in the country in 1903 aged 52.

== Bibliography ==
- Carlaw, Derek (2020). Kent County Cricketers, A to Z: Part One (1806–1914) (PDF). Cardiff: ACS.
