= James Genth =

England international rugby union player

- Born: Jacob Scherer Genth; July 17, 1849 Ardwick, Manchester
- Died: April 2, 1926 (aged 76) Fulham, London (aged 76 years 259 days)
- Occupation: Shipping Merchant

Rugby union career
- Position: Forward
Senior career
Years	Team	Apps	(Points)
- Manchester
International career
Years	Team	Apps	(Points)
1874-1875	England	2	

James Genth (1849–1926) was a rugby union international who represented England from 1874 to 1875.

== Early life ==
Born Jacob Scherer Genth on July 17, 1849, in Ardwick, Manchester, he was the fifth of at least seven children of Carl Georg Ferdinand Genth and Maria Louise née Scherer. Both his mother and father were originally from Hessen-Nassau and Jacob was baptised there in Frankfurt. His father, known as Ferdinand, had arrived in England in 1842, the year after marrying Maria. Ferdinand traded as a Shipping Merchant operating out of Lancashire. Although christened Jacob, his family were to refer to him as James by the time he was 11. By the age of 21, James was working as a commercial clerk in his father's firm.

== Rugby union career ==
James Genth grew up in Fallowfield, Lancashire, now a suburb of Manchester. As such, he played his club rugby for Manchester. Genth made his winning international debut on February 23, 1874, at The Oval in the fourth meeting of England and Scotland. He again represented England against Scotland the following year in Edinburgh where the match was drawn.

== Career and later life ==
James was a keen sportsman and aside from rugby also played lacrosse, at one point represented the North in the North vs South match held at the Kennington Oval on 7 April 1877. He was a keen golfer as well. James Genth continued within his father's business and became a Shipping Merchant, residing in the family home in Burnage, Lancashire. By 1901 he had retired but still travelled extensively, describing himself as a gentleman. James had moved to London by 1921 and from 1921 was married to Rose Ellen. He died on 2 April 1926.
