= Charles Touzel =

England rugby union player and priest

- Born: Charles John Cliff Touzel; 1855 Birkenhead, England
- Died: 24 August 1899 (aged 43–44) Stroud, England
- School: Wellington College
- University: St John's College, Cambridge

Rugby union career
- Position: Forward
Senior career
Years	Team	Apps	(Points)
- Cambridge University R.U.F.C.
–	Liverpool		
–	Blackheath F.C.		
International career
Years	Team	Apps	(Points)
1877	England	2	(0)

Charles John Cliff Touzel (1855 – 24 August 1899) was an English priest who became the rector of Heswall in Cheshire. In his younger days he was a rugby union player of note, representing Cambridge University and winning two international caps for England.

== Early life ==
Touzel was born in Birkenhead, Cheshire, in 1855, and was baptised 7 June of that year. He was the only son of Charles Touzel, a superintendent for the South American Steam Navigation Company, and his wife Mary Cliff. Touzel was educated at Wellington College before matriculating to St John's College, Cambridge in 1874. He received his BA in 1878, and his MA in 1881. On receiving his BA he was ordained as a Deacon at Worcester Cathedral. He was made a priest in 1879, and was a curate of Coventry from 1878 to 1880. In 1880 he became the Rector of Heswall, until he availed himself of the provisions of "The Clerical Disabilities Relief Act 1870", and disclaimed his Orders in 1886 to study law.

On 2 December 1886 he was admitted to the Inner Temple, though by 1888 he was a captain in the 3rd Battalion of the Royal Welsh Fusiliers. He later moved to Oswestry where he took residence at Rhysnant Hall, before returning to live in Heswall. He died at the age of 44 at Cotswold Sanatorium. In memory of Touzel one of the bells of St Peters parish church in Heswall is dedicated to him.

== Rugby career ==
Touzel first played rugby as a schoolboy, and was a member of the Wellington College team. On matriculating to Cambridge, he was selected for the University team gaining three sporting 'Blues' when he played in the Varsity Matches of 1874, 1875 and 1876. Described as a 'brilliant forward', Touzel saw Cambridge draw in 1874, the final 20-a-side Varsity Match, lose in 1875 and win in 1876. In 1877, while still playing for Cambridge University, he was called up to represent England in their third encounter with Ireland. Played at Kennington Oval, this was the first England game played under the new 15-a-side rules, and despite the reduction of the teams, down from 20, Touzel was one of five newly capped players. The England selectors had chosen a light forward pack to aid running with the ball, and although the Irish pack played well their poor kicking tactics allowed England to dominate, winning 2–0.

Just over a month later, Touzel was given his second international call up, this time an away game to Scotland. The game was a dour affair, which Scotland controlled throughout. The game was decided by a long range drop goal from Scotland's Malcolm Cross, and Touzel never represented his country again. Despite the end of his international career, Touzel continued to play rugby, representing both Liverpool and Blackheath F.C.

== Bibliography ==
- Griffiths, John (1982). The Book of English International Rugby 1872-1982. London: Willow Books. ISBN 0002180065.
- Marshall, Howard; Jordon, J.P. (1951). Oxford v Cambridge, The Story of the University Rugby Match. London: Clerke & Cockeran.
