= Cecil Ernest Claude Fischer =

Botanist

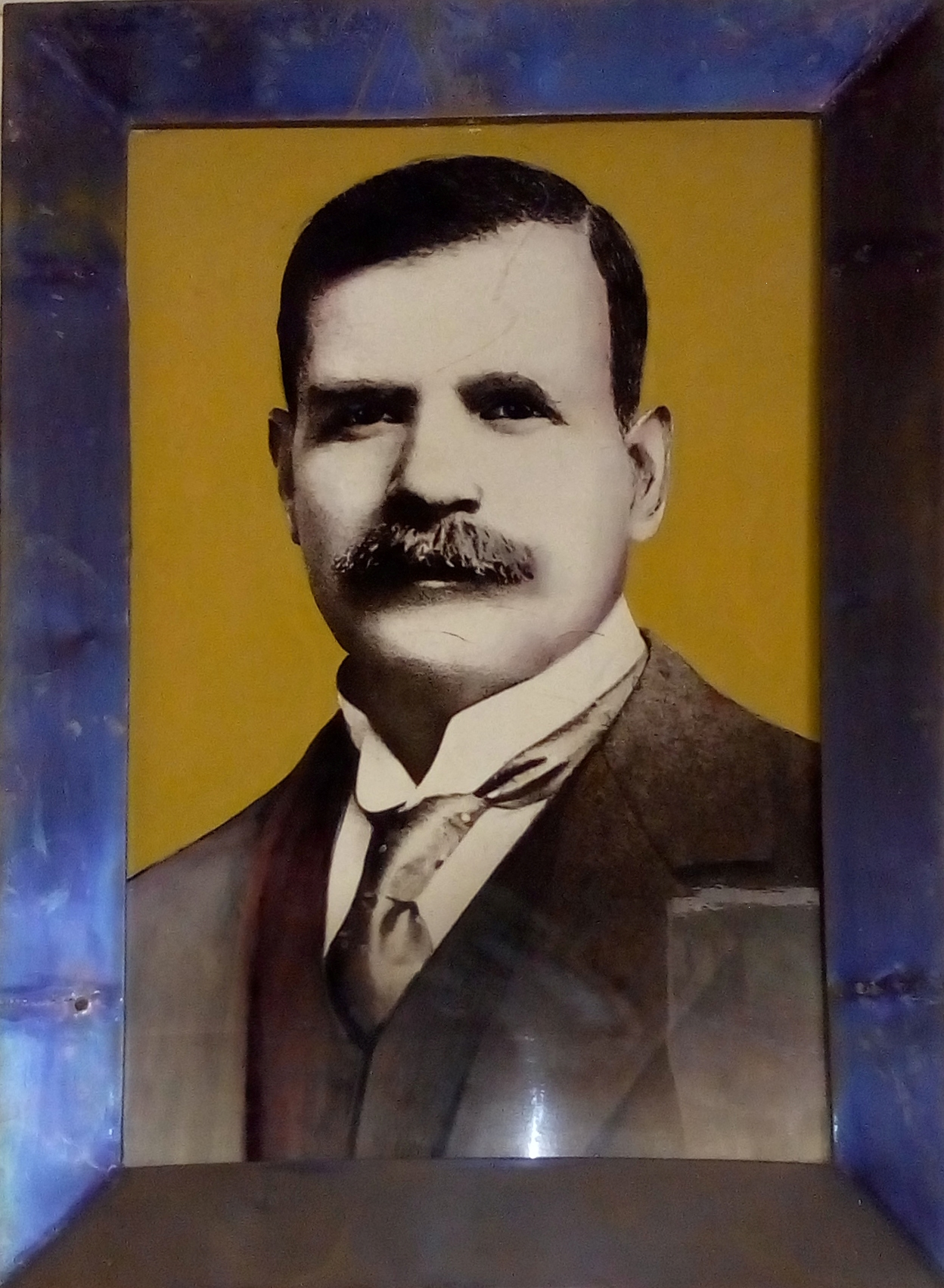
- Black and white photograph of Fischer
- Born: 9 July 1874; Bombay, India
- Died: 19 October 1950 (aged 76)
- Education: Royal Indian Engineering College
- Scientific career
- Fields: Botany
- Author abbrev. (botany): C.E.C.Fisch.

Cecil Ernest Claude Fischer (9 July 1874 – 19 October 1950) was a botanist born in Bombay to European parents. He worked principally in the Indian Forest Service.

== Life ==
Fischer was born in Bombay, India on 9 July 1874. Prior to university training, he was educated in Switzerland and England. From 1892 to 1895 he attended the Royal Indian Engineering College (also called Cooper's Hill College) where he studied forestry. His first professional posting in 1895 was in the Indian Forest Service in the Madras Presidency, a province of British India. In 1907 he served as an entomologist in Dehradun. From 1915 to 1917 he helped administrate the Madras Forest College (now called the Tamil Nadu Forest Department). From 1919-1920 he taught silviculture at the University of Oxford. From 1920 to 1923 he served as a conservator of forests in Madras. He retired from the Indian Forest Service in 1926. From 1925 to 1940 he served as an assistant for India at the Herbarium of the Royal Botanic Gardens, Kew.

== Legacy ==
He is the authority for at least 277 taxa including: IPNI. List of plant names with authority C.E.C.Fisch..

The Fischer Herbarium at the Institute of Forest Genetics and Tree Breeding in Coimbatore, Tamil Nadu is named in honor of Fischer.
