= Thomas Gisborne Gordon =

Rugby union player from Northern Ireland

- Born: Thomas Gisborne Gordon; 15 December 1851 Belfast, Ireland.
- Died: 8 July 1935 (aged 83)
- School: Rugby School
- Occupation: Wine Merchant

Rugby union career
- Position(s): Half-back and Three-quarter back
Senior career
Years	Team	Apps	(Points)
- North of Ireland F.C.
International career
Years	Team	Apps	(Points)
1877–78	Ireland	3	

Thomas Gisborne Gordon (15 December 1851 – 8 July 1935) was a rugby football player who played for North of Ireland F.C. and represented Ireland. He has the distinction of being the only one-handed/armed man ever to play international rugby (union or league).

== Biography ==
Thomas Gisborne Gordon was born in Belfast, Ulster in 1851. He was educated at Rugby School in the town of Rugby, Warwickshire, England before returning home to play his club rugby at North of Ireland F.C. (NIFC) and to work as a wine merchant. He only had one hand, his left, having lost the right one in a shooting accident. He married Marie Louise Graham in 1890 and the couple had two children, Helen, born in July 1891 and Thomas, born August 1899. He died in 1935, at the age of 83.

Gordon's obituary in the Rugby Football Annual described him as "keenly interested in horse racing and breeding horses." Isabel Giberne Sieveking's A turning point in the Indian mutiny is dedicated to him.

== Playing career ==
Thomas Gisborne Gordon gained three caps for Ireland, making his debut in the first rugby international played between 15-a-side teams: England v Ireland at The Oval on 5 February 1877, a game which England won by 2 goals & 2 tries to nil. Previous to this, rugby had been played with 20-a-side teams. He won his second cap against Scotland before completing his international career against the English in 1878 at Lansdowne Road in the first rugby test played at the venue. Previous matches were held at the Leinster Cricket Club in Rathmines. He played Test rugby at Half-back and at club level in the Three-quarter line.

== Other disabled rugby players ==
While Thomas Gisborne Gordon is the only amputee to have appeared in international rugby, some others have appeared in club matches over the years. One such example was a player by the name of Wakeham, who played for Newton Abbot RFC in Devon, England. In a Devon derby against Plymouth RFC on 30 January 1886, Wakeham kicked thirteen conversions from thirteen attempts, creating what is claimed to be a record for English club rugby at the time.

Danny Crates, is the Paralympic world record holder in 800m sprinting, and has won gold medals in a number of international competitions, including the Paralympic Games. He also plays competitive rugby and is a qualified diving instructor. However, Crates has not played rugby at international level. He has carried the Olympic Torch twice.

Jock Wemyss who played at prop for Scotland lost an eye during World War I, but continued to play after the conflict.

In Washington, DC, Willie Stewart lost an arm in a construction accident (at the Watergate Hotel), and yet went on to captain the prestigious Washington Rugby Union Football Club, a very successful Division I Club in the USA.

== See also ==
- Douglas Bader, English amputee flying ace, who had previously played for Harlequin F.C.
- 1876–77 Home Nations rugby union matches
- 1877–78 Home Nations rugby union matches
- Quad rugby, a sport influenced by rugby played in wheelchairs.

=== Other one-handed sportspeople ===
- Pete Gray, a one armed professional baseball player.
- Bobby Martin (American football)
- Willie McQueen
- Brice Taylor, one handed American football player.
