= Frederick Gebbie =

British civil engineer (1871–1939)

Sir Frederick St John Gebbie CIE (7 August 1871 – 20 March 1939) was a British civil engineer in India.

Gebbie was born in Buenos Aires, Argentina, and educated at Edinburgh Collegiate School, the University of Edinburgh and the Royal Indian Engineering College. He joined the Bombay Presidency Public Works Department as an assistant engineer in 1893, was promoted to executive engineer in 1899, superintending engineer in 1911, and chief engineer in 1915, and became secretary of the department in 1916. He worked for many years in Sind and was one of the main proponents of the Lloyd Barrage at Sukkur, which was constructed to irrigate the region.

In 1920, Gebbie was sent to Egypt to chair the Nile Projects Commission, which examined irrigation of the River Nile. In 1921, he was appointed Inspector-General of Irrigation of the Government of India, and was instrumental in the construction of defences to prevent the town of Dera Ismail Dun being flooded by the Indus. His post was abolished in 1923 and he was appointed Consulting Engineer to the Government of India. He retired in 1926.

Gebbie was appointed a Companion of the Order of the Indian Empire (CIE) in the 1920 New Year Honours and was knighted in 1925.
