= Herbert George Billson =

British Colonial Administrator

Herbert George Billson CIE
- Born: Herbert George Billson; 1871; Bedford, England
- Died: 27 October 1938 (aged 66–67); Cheltenham, England
- Occupations: British colonial administrator and natural scientist
- Years active: 1893-1926
- Known for: He was the Chief Conservator of Indian Forests.

Herbert George Billson CIE (1871–1938) was a British colonial administrator and natural scientist who worked for the Imperial Forestry Service in India and became Chief Conservator of Indian Forests.

== Early life ==
Herbert Billson was the son of Edwin Billson and he was born in Bedford, England in 1871. He was educated at Bedford Modern School and he studied forestry at the Royal Indian Engineering College at Cooper's Hill, Surrey.

== Forestry service ==
He joined the Imperial Forestry Service in India in 1893 and rose to become Assistant Inspector-General of Forests, Government of India in 1912-13. From 1914-20 he was Conservator of Forests and from 1920-22 Officiating Chief Conservator. In 1922 this position was made permanent and he remained as Chief Conservator of Indian Forests until his retirement in 1926. He also served as a Member of the Legislative Council, United Provinces. He was appointed CIE in the 1925 New Year's Honours.

== Rugby ==
Herbert Billson was a good rugby player; he played one season for Bedford in 1893/4 during which they won 27 out of 29 matches played.

== Family life ==
In 1900 he married Dolly Tulloch. They later settled in Cheltenham, England where Herbert Billson died on 27 October 1938.
