= Bertram Beresford Osmaston =

Bertram Beresford Osmaston CIE (3 January 1868 – 1961) was an officer in the Imperial Forestry Service in India. Known to many as "BB" he was born at Yeldersley Hall, Derbyshire. Born ninth into a family of fifteen, he was educated at Cheltenham and Royal Indian Engineering College at Cooper's Hill. He joined the Forest Service in India in 1888 and served in the United Provinces, Bengal, Andamans, Burma and retired as a Chief Conservator of the Central Provinces. He was a keen naturalist and made notes of his observations during postings in various parts of India, eventually publishing over 50 books. On 15 Sep 1892 he was married to Catherine Mary Hutchinson at Port Blair in the Andamans.

A species of grass (Cymbopogon osmastonii) and several subspecies of birds (Pelargopsis capensis osmastoni, Pericrocotus cinnamomeus osmastoni) are named after him.
