= Henry Halcro Johnston =

Scotland international rugby union player, botanist & physician

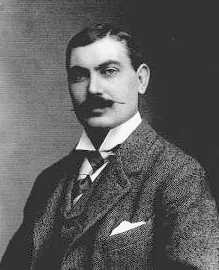
- Born: Henry Halcro Johnston; 13 September 1856 Orphir House, Orphir, Orkney, Scotland
- Died: 18 October 1939 (aged 83) Orphir, Orkney, Scotland
- School: Dollar Academy; Edinburgh Collegiate School
- University: Edinburgh University

Rugby union career
- Position: Fullback
Amateur team(s)
Years	Team	Apps	(Points)
- Edinburgh Collegiate
–	Edinburgh University		
Provincial / State sides
Years	Team	Apps	(Points)
1876	East of Scotland District		
International career
Years	Team	Apps	(Points)
1876–77	Scotland	2	

Colonel Henry Halcro Johnston CB CBE DL FRSE FLS (13 September 1856 – 18 October 1939) was a Scottish botanist, physician, rugby union international and Deputy Lieutenant for Orkney. As a member of Edinburgh University RFC he represented Scotland in 1877 and went on to make a significant contribution to botany and horticulture through his meticulous collection and recording of plant species during and after his distinguished military career.

== Life ==
Henry Halcro Johnston was born at Orphir House, Orkney, Scotland, on 13 September 1856, the fifth son of James Johnston J.P., 11th Laird of Coubister, Orkney - a descendant of the brother of James Johnston (1724–1800). He was educated at Dollar Academy, followed by the Collegiate School of Edinburgh, and finally at the University of Edinburgh, where he graduated M.B., C.M. in 1880.

Having qualified as a doctor, Johnston entered the army as a surgeon on 30 July 1881. His war service included Sudan, in 1885, at Suakin, for which he received the Egypt Medal (with the Suakin 1885 clasp) and Khedive's Star.

He was awarded his doctorate (MD) in 1893 and in the same year took the B.Sc., proceeding D.Sc. (Public Health) in 1894.

In 1895 he was elected a Fellow of the Royal Society of Edinburgh for his contributions to botany. His proposers were Andrew Douglas Maclagan, Thomas Richard Fraser, Sir Isaac Bayley Balfour, and Charles Hunter Stewart.

He went on to serve on the North-West Frontier of India, from 1897 to 1898, where he was in charge of British No. I Field Hospital, and was active in operations in the Malakand, in Bajaur, in the Mahmund country, and in Buner, including the action at Laudakai and the attack and capture of the Tanga Pass.

He was mentioned in dispatches on 22 April 1898, and received the India Medal with the Punjab Frontier 1897–98 clasp. He then served in the Second Boer War in South Africa, from 1899 to 1902, and was active in operations in Natal. He was mentioned in dispatches, on 2 February 1901 and on 29 July 1902. He received the Queen's South Africa Medal with clasp (which may have been the Natal state clasp or a battle specific clasp) and also the King's South Africa Medal with both the South Africa 1901 clasp and the South Africa 1902 clasp. For his services he was made a Companion of the Order of the Bath (abbreviated in postnominal letters to CB) in the October 1902 South African Honours list.

He attained the rank of Colonel on 16 February 1911, and retired on 13 September 1913. However, after his retirement he rejoined for service in the First World War, when he served as assistant director of Medical Services at Glasgow and at York, and as deputy director of Medical Services at Gibraltar. He received the C.B.E. for his services.

== Rugby union career ==
=== Amateur career ===
Johnston was a noted rugby footballer.

He was first recorded as playing for his school and then being an Edinburgh Collegiate player. After joining Edinburgh University he did not again receive an international cap, but for three years he played as a forward in the Edinburgh University fifteen.

=== Provincial career ===
He was selected to play for East of Scotland District in 1876.

=== International career ===
He was selected to play as full-back for Scotland against both Ireland and England in 1877.

== Contribution to science ==
He was the author of numerous contributions to scientific journals. His work was based around the plants he had collected in Afghanistan, Mauritius, Canaries, Madeira, Egypt, Gambia, Natal, India, and Sierra Leone. He then collected in the Orkney Islands from 1919. He contributions were particularly focussed on the flora of Mauritius and the islands of Orkney and Shetland and published in the Transactions of the Botanical Society of Edinburgh.

=== Publications ===
Among his many publications and contributions were the following:

- Report on the flora of Round island, Mauritius, Botanical Society, 1894
- Report on the flora of the outlying islands in Mahébourg bay, Mauritius, 1895
- Reports on the flora of Île des Aigrettes and Les Bénitiers, Mauritius, 1894

== Personal and later life ==
After retirement he settled at Orphir, in his native Orkney, where he was a deputy lieutenant of the county. He was unmarried.
