= Petley Price =

England international rugby union player

P L A Price
- Born: Petley Lloyd Augustus Price; 25 April 1856 Poonah, Bombay Presidency
- Died: 30 December 1910 (aged 54) Mereside Ganges, Salt Spring Island, British Columbia
- University: Royal Indian Engineering College
- Occupation: Civil Engineer

Rugby union career
- Position: Halfback
Senior career
Years	Team	Apps	(Points)
- RIE College RFC
International career
Years	Team	Apps	(Points)
1877-1878	England	3	

Petley Price (25 April 1856 to 30 December 1910) was a rugby union international who represented England on three occasions from 1877 to 1878.

== Early life ==
Petley Lloyd Augustus Price was born at Poonah, Bombay Presidency on 25 April 1856 and was baptised there. His father was Lieutenant-Colonel Augustus Price (14 June 1813 – 17 May 1860) of the 4th Bombay Rifles and his mother was Elizabeth Emma Hodgson (30 September 1819 – 24 October 1890), the daughter of Major-General Christopher Hodgson of the Bombay Artillery and his wife Elizabeth Rowlandson. Petley was the third child of Augustus and Elizabeth having been preceded by older twins Augustus and Florence Engel Augusta (both born 28 Jan 1853, although Augustus died the same day). Petley also had two younger siblings, Herman Chichely Augustus (born in Bath on 14 June 1858) and Ada Elizabeth Augusta (born in Bath on 19 August 1859). Through his father Petley was also the great grandson of Sir Charles Price, 1st Baronet of Spring Grove, via Charles' third surviving son Richard Price and his wife Elizabeth Engel. Petley was later educated at the Royal Indian Engineering College in Cooper's Hill.

== Rugby union career ==
Petley played rugby football at Cooper's Hill. At the time the college's representative side had a first-class fixture list and a very strong reputation. Petley was one of nine internationally capped players to have attended the college in the 1870s. He made his international debut for England on 5 February 1877 at The Oval in the England vs Ireland match, and was on the winning side. However, the following month he traveled with England to Edinburgh where Scotland were victorious. The following year on 4 March 1878 he once again played at The Oval, this time helping England to a draw with Scotland. This was to prove his last match for England before traveling to India as an engineer.

== Career and later life ==
After his training at Cooper's Hill he became an Assistant Engineer in the Bengal Civil Service. He was still a member of the Institution of Civil Engineers in 1889.

In 1884 he married Mary Cotton Egerton, (died 1946), the daughter of Commander Frederic Arthur Egerton of the Royal Navy and Juliet Olivia Burnett After his marriage, the couple moved to Canada and there had the first two of their five children Augustus Robert Petley (born 4 May 1885) and Elizabeth Rosina May (born 7 December 1886). They then moved for a time to Nova Scotia and had three more children, Harold Tudor Egerton (born 19 March 1888), Reginald (born 28 August 1889) and Ada Marjorie (born 18 October 1890). The family soon moved back to Canada, to Mereside Ganges, Salt Spring Island, British Columbia.

Petley Price died on 30 December 1910 on Salt Spring Island and is buried in the church of St Mary
