= Henry Anderson Bryden =

English rugby union player and naturalist (1854–1937)

Henry Bryden
- Born: Henry Anderson Bryden; 3 May 1854 Banbury, Oxfordshire
- Died: 23 September 1937 (aged 83) Parkstone, Dorset
- School: Brackenbury's Anglican Preparatory Military Academy
- University: Cheltenham College

Rugby union career
- Position: Forward
Amateur team(s)
Years	Team	Apps	(Points)
-	Clapham Rovers		
International career
Years	Team	Apps	(Points)
1874	England	1	

Henry Anderson Bryden (3 May 1854 – 23 September 1937) was an English solicitor, athlete and sportsman, playing rugby for England in 1874. He was a keen hunter and naturalist and travelled widely. He then became a professional author writing about wildlife and his hunting experiences.

== Early life ==
Henry Bryden was born on 3 May 1854 in Banbury, the third son of William Anderson Bryden, and Maria, daughter of William Cowper. He attended Brackenbury's Anglican Preparatory Military Academy and went on to study at Cheltenham College, leaving in 1869. At Cheltenham at the same time were his two older brothers, William Radford Bryden the architect, and Charles Bryden, also a future England rugby union international. As well as rugby football, Henry was known as an excellent long-distance runner, and holder of 37 prizes. He represented South versus North of England, and was second to Walter Slade in what was at the time the fastest amateur mile on record (time 4m 24.5s) in 1875. Bryden finished second in the half-mile event at the 1875 AAC Championships.

== Rugby union career ==
Bryden played his club rugby for the dual code side, Clapham Rovers, the two codes being rugby union and association football. From there he was called up for England, and made his only international appearance on 23 February 1874 at The Oval against Scotland match.

== Later life ==
Bryden went on to train as a solicitor and after leaving Cheltenham he moved in with his parents in Croydon, Surrey. However, he resided and travelled extensively in South Africa, chiefly in pursuit of sport and natural history and also traveled in Morocco, the Canaries, Norway, Portugal, Spain and France. He married Julia St John Wright on 10 August 1881 in Southam, Northamptonshire with whom he had one daughter (Olivia) and one son (Colonel Ronald A.Bryden DSO, RAMC.) Although trained as a solicitor, he later became an author by profession, drawing on his experiences in Africa. His obituary in the Times was headed "Sportsman, Athlete and Naturalist". In this obituary, his book The Enchantment of the Field of 1931 was noted as his best book, "as it is the most varied; it contains an instructive comparison between conditions and methods of foxhunting in England, France and America." Also noted was his Wild Life in South Africa of 1936 that showed his powers of observation as a naturalist.

Among his recreational pursuits were hunting, fishing, shooting, golf, and natural history. He was also a member of the Constitutional and Shikar clubs.

== Publications ==
- Wild Life in South Africa (Pub 1936??) The birds and animals of South Africa from cuckoos to giraffes, from pidgeons to lions.
- Gun and Camera in Southern Africa. A year wandering in Bechuanaland, the Kalahari Desert, and the Lake River country, Ngamiland with Notes on Colonisation, Natives, Natural History, and Sport.-Edward Stanford, 1893 London, 544pp, ISBN 0935632735.
- Great and Small Game of Africa (with Lydekker) - Bryden Editor of this. An Account of the Distribution, Habits, and Natural History of the Sporting Mammals, with personal hunting Experiences Pub by Rowland Ward, London 1899.
- Kloof and Karroo: Sport, legend and natural history in Cape Colony: with a notice of the game birds, and of the present distribution of the antelopes and larger game. Pub. London: Longmans Green, 1889. xiii
- Tales of South Africa, 1896
- Nature and Sport in South Africa. Pub Chapman and Hall, 1897.
- From Veldt Camp Fires,1900
- Hare-Hunting and Harriers. 1903. Hare-hunting and Harriers: With Notices of Beagles and Basset Hounds by H. A. Bryden.
- Giraffes, and How to Capture Them, article in The Pall Mall Magazine Nov 1893
- The Tragedy of a Noble Poacher, article in Chambers's Journal, 7 Mar 1908
- The Gold Kloof, LONDON Thomas Nelson & Sons 1907
