= William Hutchinson (rugby, born 1849) =

England international rugby union player

William Henry Heap Hutchinson
- Full name: William Henry Heap Hutchinson
- Born: 31 October 1849 Sculcoates, East Riding of Yorkshire, England
- Died: 4 July 1929 (aged 79) Beverley, East Riding of Yorkshire, England

Rugby union career
- Position: Forwards
Senior career
| Years | Team | Apps | (Points) |
| – | Hull F.C. | | |
International career
| Years | Team | Apps | (Points) |
| 1875 | England | 2 | (0) |

William Henry Heap Hutchinson (31 October 1849 – 4 July 1929) was an English rugby union footballer who played in the 1870s. He played at representative level for England, and at club level for Hull FC, as a forward, e.g. front row, lock, or back row. Prior to Thursday 29 August 1895, Hull F.C. was a rugby union club.

== Background ==
William Hutchinson's birth was registered in Sculcoates district, he died in Beverley.

== Playing career ==
William Hutchinson won caps for England while at Hull F.C. in 1874–75 Home Nations rugby union match against Ireland, and in the 1875–76 Home Nations rugby union match against Ireland.
