= John Birkett (surgeon) =

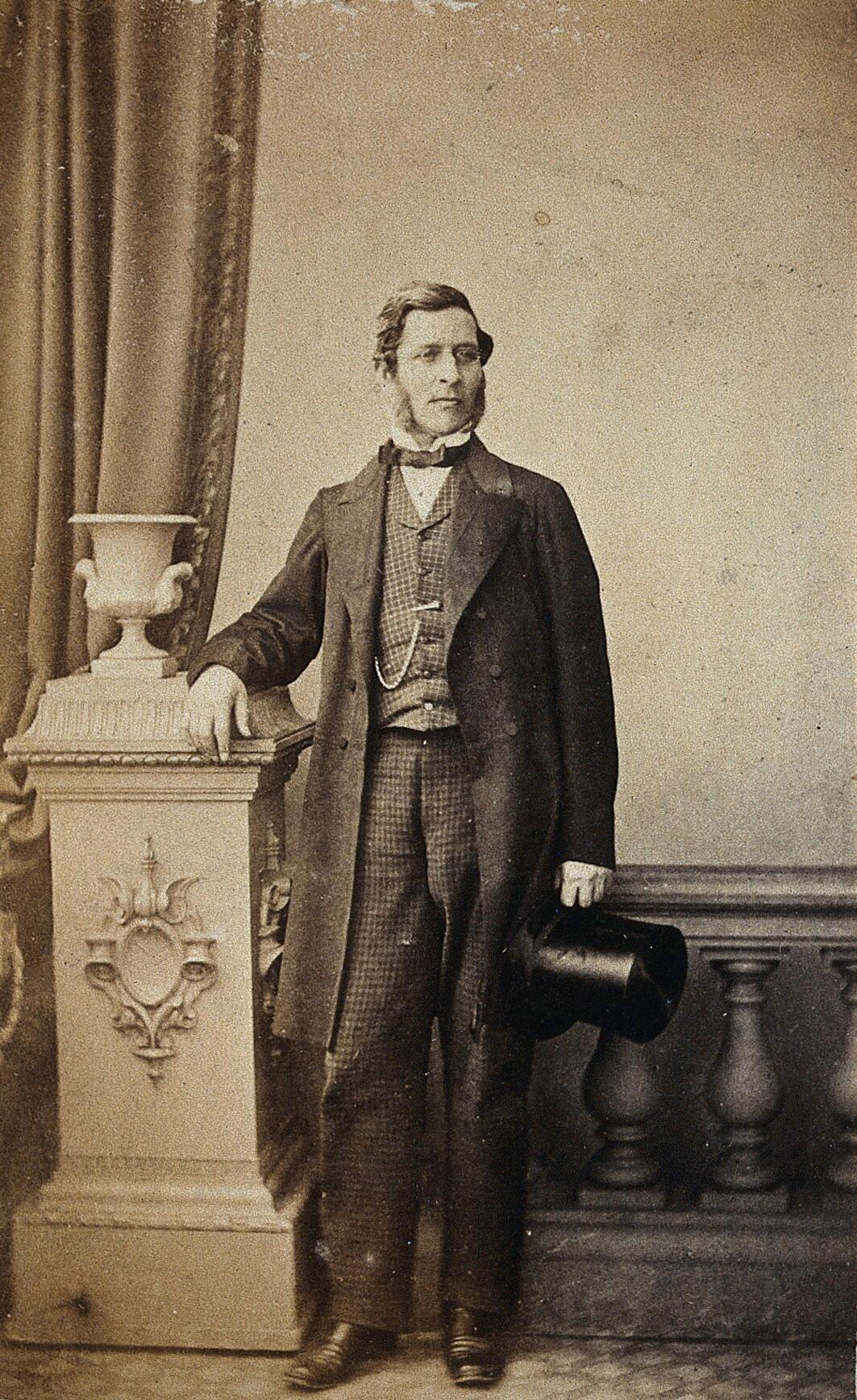
Portrait. Credit: Wellcome Library

John Birkett, F.R.C.S. F.L.S. (1815–1904) was an English surgeon and member of the Linnean Society of London who was an early specialist on breast disease, including breast cancer, and an early advocate of histology. He published a book on breast disease in the mid-nineteenth century.

Birkett was born near London in 1815. He was an apprentice to Bransby Cooper, a nephew of Astley Cooper, and like him a surgeon at Guy's Hospital. He became assistant surgeon in 1849 and took Bransby Cooper's position after the latter retired, in 1853. An early advocate of histology, he introduced the teaching thereof in 1845, and subsequently promoted the use of histopathology in cancer diagnosis.

== Eponyms ==
Medical instruments and disorders that are named after Birkett are the Birkett forceps, the Birkett haemostatic forceps, and Birkett hernia. The Birkett hernia is also known as an ascending hernia or intermusculuar hernia, and is the type of inguinal hernia where the sac extends into the anterior or inferior wall.

== The Diseases of the Breast and Their Treatment ==
Birkett's most memorable contribution to his field was his treatise on diseases on the mammary gland, the very first comprehensive treatment of the subject, for which he was awarded the Jacksonian Prize by The Royal College of Surgeons of England in 1848. The dissertation was published as a book entitled The Diseases of the Breast and Their Treatment (Birkett 1850) in 1850. It was 258 pages long, with 12 plates.

Birkett's work fell into obscurity for 150 years, and both it and he himself (in the context of breast disease at least) were largely forgotten by medical historians. He receives no mention, for example, in the Biographical History of Guy's Hospital (Wilks & Bettany 1892). His book was overshadowed by a book published by Alfred Velpeau some four years later, and even contemporary reviewers were initially unsure that Birkett's work provided much beyond that of Astley Cooper. One reviewer, writing in the Provincial Medical and Surgical Journal in 1850, said that "[t]he diseases of the breast have been so fully described by Sir Astley Cooper, that we took up Mr. Birkett's essay without much hope of further information, but on perusal we found much additional matter". Velpeau was aware of Birkett's book, a fact apparent from his quoting it several times in his own, and it is likely that it was Birkett's publication that spurred Velpeau finally to publication after 30 years.

Described by the PMSJ reviewer as "the most complete monograph in the English language" on the subject, the book contained drawings, some coloured, in stone and zinc, observations by other doctors on carcinomae, Birkett's own observations, and a table of causes of death by mammarian cancer of 37 patients in Guy's Hospital. It was the first treatment of the subject to focus primarily on benign conditions rather than on cancerous ones, devoting 215 pages to the former and only 42 to the latter. This can be contrasted with the 88 preceding publications that Birkett quoted, almost all of which were primarily devoted to cancer.

Birkett's approach to the subject compares favourably with the approaches both of Velpeau and of other contemporary works. Birkett divided up the subject simply and logically, into:

1. Diseases before puberty
2. Diseases during the establishment of puberty
3. Diseases after the establishment of puberty
  1. During pregnancy, puerperium and lactation
  2. At any period or age after puberty

He gave a clinical description of each condition, and related it to both anatomy and physiology. His descriptions of management of the various conditions are outmoded in the 21st century. But his descriptions and illustrations of the conditions are still useful today. In plates vii and viii, for examples, one can find seven well-executed microscopic illustrations of two cases of lobular carcinomae. The book also contains descriptions of a typical mammary fistula; treatment of the same by seton stitch; breast cysts; and mastalgia and galactorrhea. Mansel, Sweetland, and Hughes describe the macroscopic and microscopic illustrations of duct ectasia and fibroadenoma in the plates as "ahead of their time", also observing that the descriptions of duct ectasia pre-date the work of Joseph Colt Bloodgood by half a century.

== Life and career ==
=== Hospital and teaching career ===
Birkett was tutored on a wide range of subjects in several British public schools, it being recorded that one of his schoolmasters was a Frenchman, one a Greek scholar, and one a mathematician and astronomer. In September 1831, at age 16, he was made the apprentice of Bransby Blake Cooper, who was a surgeon at Guy's Hospital at the time. He was one of the last people, possibly indeed the last person, to pay the £500 fee for such apprenticeship, which was the customary fee for ensuring that the apprentice received higher priority consideration by the master when a vacancy for a surgeon at the hospital opened up. He began his medical studies in October of the following year.

Birkett was admitted a Member of the Royal College of Surgeons on 1837-10-06, and appointed a Demonstrator of Anatomy at the same time, a post that he held until 1847. In 1844 he was elected Fellow of the R.C.S. without examination, and by 1845/1846 he was giving demonstrations in microscopic anatomy on weekday evenings, the first instruction in histology given at the medical school. In 1847 he was appointed to the position of making the hospital's post-mortem examinations. In May 1849 he was elected assistant surgeon. after the promotion of Edward Cock and the death of John Morgan. In 1851 he gave joint lectures with John Hilton on anatomy. And in 1853 he succeeded Cooper as a surgeon upon Cooper's retirement. He remained surgeon, lecturing on surgery with John Poland, until he himself retired in 1875, at the age of 60.

=== Royal College of Surgeons and other professional societies ===
Birkett was a member of the Council of the R.C.S. from 1867 to 1883, and Hunterian Professor of Surgery and Pathology from 1869 to 1871. He moved up through the R.C.S. ranks. He was Examiner in Anatomy and Physiology from 1875 to 1877, member of the Court of Examiners from 1872 to 1882, member of the Examining Board for Dental Surgery from 1875 to 1882, Vice-President (1875–1876), and finally President in 1877.

Elsewhere, Birkett was also one of the founders of the Pathological Society of London, where he was Vice-President from 1860 to 1862. In 1871 and 1892 he was Master of the Worshipful Company of Ironmongers, and he was also Inspector for the Home Office of the Anatomical schools of Anatomy in the Provinces.

=== Family and personal life ===
The only child of John and Mary Birkett, Birkett was born on 1815-04-15 at 10, The Terrace, Upper Clapton, Middlesex, England. From 1840 to 1848, he lived at 2 Broad Street Buildings. Making a bid for a practice he then moved to Wellington Street, Southwark. In 1856, he moved again to Green Street, Grosvenor Square. Upon retirement from active life, he finally moved to Sussex Gardens, where he died on 1904-07-06, after a stroke, aged 90.

He married Lucy Matilda, daughter of Halsey Jansen, in 1842, and out of a family of seven sons and three daughters, he was survived by four sons and one daughter. Two of those sons were to become distinguished rugby football players, Reg and Louis.
