= Box, Gloucestershire =

Village in Gloucestershire, England

Coordinates: 51.700944°N 2.209067°W

Box
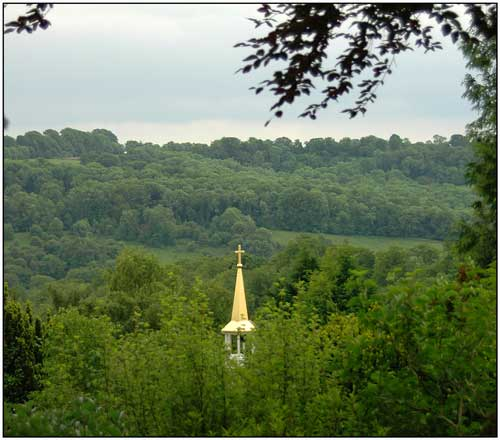
- Church of St Barnabas, Box

- Location within Gloucestershire
- Population: About 400
- OS grid reference: SO8600
- District: Stroud
- Shire county: Gloucestershire
- Region: South West
- Country: England
- Sovereign state: United Kingdom
- Post town: STROUD
- Postcode district: GL6
- Police: Gloucestershire
- Fire: Gloucestershire
- Ambulance: South Western

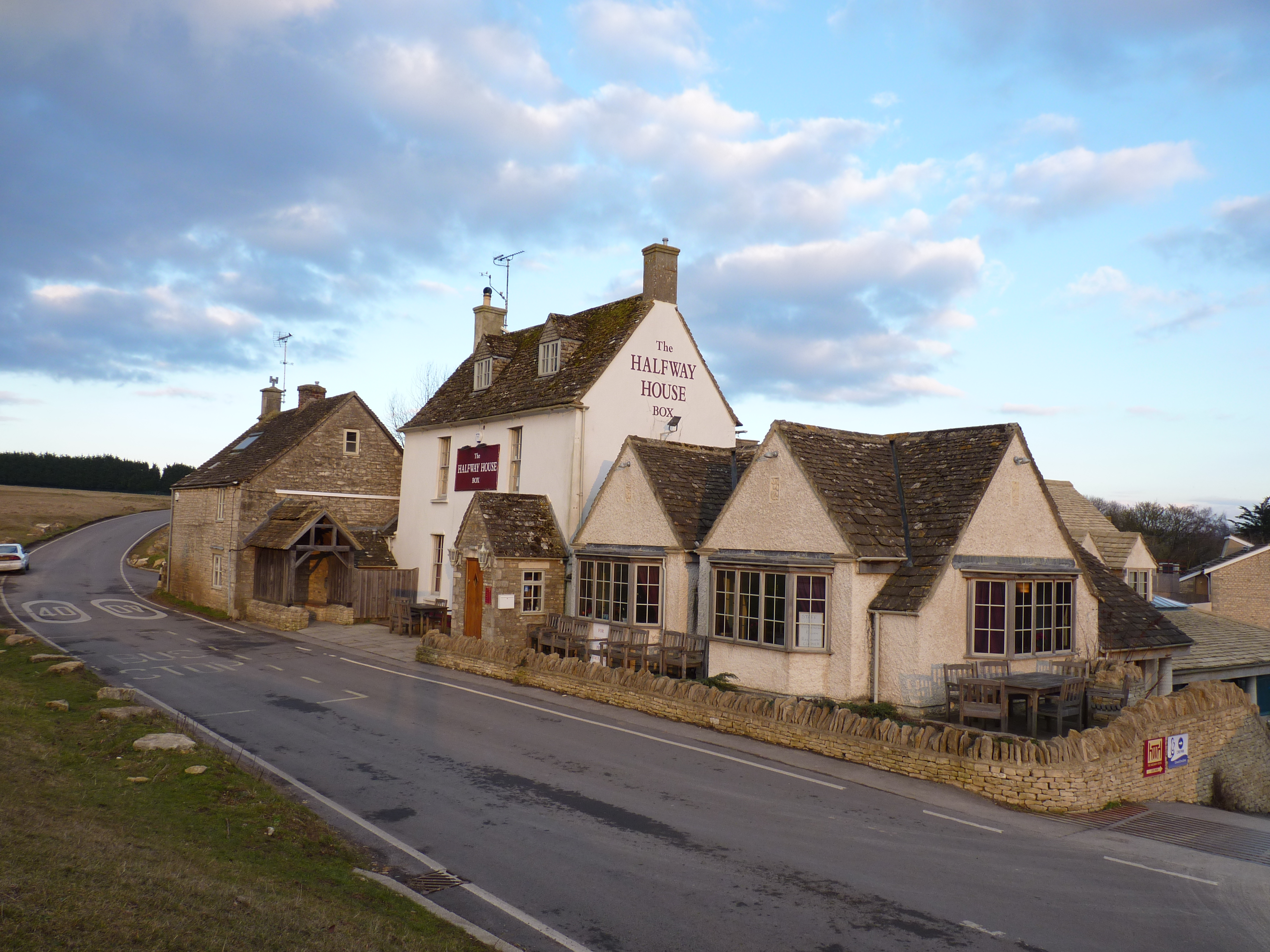
The Halfway House public house in 2010, now a cafe

Box is a small village in Gloucestershire, England. It is in the civil parish of Minchinhampton, and is located 3 miles (4.8 km) south of Stroud and 10 miles (16 km) west of Cirencester. Minchinhampton is about 1 mile (1.6 km) away and Nailsworth is about 1.5 miles (2.4 km) away. Box has a population of about 400. Box lies at the edge of Minchinhampton Common, designated as a SSSI. The common is used for the grazing of cattle, and the absence of a cattle grid at the entrance to the village means cows are able to wander through its streets. The village holds annual produce show, pantomime and open garden events.

== Economy ==
Historically, the area of Box was used for agriculture (as evidenced by farms around the village). Quarries were prevalent in the area, although by the turn of the 20th century the majority of those in Box had closed. Until the early 20th century, an inn was situated in the centre of the village. It is now a private dwelling known as The Old Box Inn. The village is served by the Halfway Café and Shop.

== Architecture ==
Many buildings in the village use Cotswold stone. Such buildings include the early 19th-century Box Terrace—a row of five (formerly six) terraced houses—as well as numerous other private dwellings. The 17th-century Box House overlooks Box Wood and the Nailsworth Valley.

== Education ==
Box has two schools. The co-educational Cotswold Chine School opened in 1954 to cater for students aged 7–19 with special educational needs. Beaudesert Park School, a co-educational preparatory school, has been situated on the west side of the village since 1918.

== Religious sites ==
The first place of worship in the village was a mission church built in 1880. The corrugated iron building was originally used for an infant school. After the First World War, the building began to house the village Sunday School and weekly Evensong service. The church lacked an altar and organ; musical accompaniment was played on a harmonium. The church was expanded in the 1920s by the rector of Minchinhampton, who oversaw the installation of a piano and provided the use of a portable altar, and the building itself was extended in the 1930s. By the outbreak of the Second World War, the village had begun to fundraise to build a permanent church. The foundation stone was laid by Bishop of Gloucester Clifford Woodward in 1951, and the building completed the following October. The church was consecrated by Woodward's successor, Wilfred Askwith. The church is dedicated to St Barnabas, and now offers a Eucharist service on Sundays and Holy Communion on Wednesdays.
