= Edward Perrott =

England international rugby union player

- Born: Edward Simcocks Perrott; 16 September 1851 Bronhyddron, Oswestry, Shropshire, England
- Died: 22 April 1915 (aged 63) Llansantffraid
- School: Cheltenham College

Rugby union career
- Position: Forward
Amateur team(s)
Years	Team	Apps	(Points)
-	Old Cheltonians		
International career
Years	Team	Apps	(Points)
1875	England	1	

Edward Perrott (1851–1915) was a rugby union international who represented England in 1875.

== Early life ==
Perrott was born on 16 September 1851 in Bronhyddron, Oswestry, Shropshire, England, the eldest of the eight children of Robert Simcocks Perrott (1813–1888) and Elizabeth Ann Owen (c. 1823 – c. post 1881). His father had been born in Llansaintffraid, Montgomeryshire, Wales and in 1865 was the High Sheriff of Montgomeryshire. His maternal grandfather was a clergyman and had been the Rector of Penmorfa and also of Llaneddwyn. He attended Cheltenham College.

== Rugby union career ==
Perrott played rugby at Cheltenham College and went on to represent the old boys side, Old Cheltonians, as an adult. It was from this team that he was selected to play for England, and he made his international debut and only appearance for England on 15 February 1875 in the match against England at The Oval, which England won.
