= Charles Bryden =

English rugby union player

- Born: Charles Cowper Bryden; 16 June 1852 Banbury
- Died: 20 February 1941 (aged 88) Poole (aged 88 years 249 days)
- School: Cheltenham College
- Occupation: Colonial Broker

Rugby union career
- Position: Forward
Senior career
Years	Team	Apps	(Points)
- Clapham Rovers
International career
Years	Team	Apps	(Points)
1875–1877	England	2	(0)

Charles Bryden (1852–1941) was a rugby union international who represented England from 1875 to 1877.

== Early life ==
Charles Cowper Bryden was born on 16 June 1852 in Banbury, the second son of William Anderson Bryden, and Maria, daughter of William Cowper. His father, William Anderson Bryden, having been born in Manchester in 1818 had made his way to Australia as a young man and went into partnership with Robert Miller in Adelaide. By 1844 they had a drapery business called Miller & Bryden, a forerunner of J. Miller Anderson & Co. Miller and Bryden's partnership dissolved in June 1848, and soon after William returned to England. He married Maria Cowper in 1850 and soon after their eldest son, William, was born the family moved to Banbury and William Anderson became a brewer and spirit merchant. In 1861 the family moved to Clapham where Charles's eighth and ninth siblings were born. In 1878, when Charles was 27, the family moved to Surbiton, Surrey.

Charles attended Cheltenham College, leaving in 1869. At Cheltenham at the same time were his two brothers, William Radford Bryden (born 1851) the architect, and Henry Bryden (born 1854), also a future England rugby union international. As well as playing rugby football, Charles also represented his school at cricket.

== Rugby union career ==
Bryden played his club rugby for the dual code side, Clapham Rovers, the two codes being rugby union and association football. He played both codes, playing association football as much as rugby. He was a key player for the club, scoring in their first match against Richmond in 21 October 1871. His younger brother, Henry, also played for Clapham and was called up to play for England on 23 February 1874 at The Oval against Scotland match. A year later, Charles was called up for his international debut on 13 December 1875 in Dublin for the Ireland vs England match, this also being Ireland's first home international. Charles later played in the Scotland v England match in Edinburgh in 1877, won by Scotland by a goal.

== Career and later life ==
Charles became a broker, describing himself as a hide broker and later a colonial broker. He married Ethel Petley (1859 - 1919) in 1887 and they had four daughters (Ethel, Violet, Phyllis and Dora). He died on 20 February 1941 in Poole, Dorset.
