= Hugh Theodore Pinhey =

- Born: 7 December 1858; Kolhapur, British Raj
- Died: 6 February 1953 (aged 94); Fleet, Hampshire, England

Hugh Theodore Pinhey (7 December 1858 – 6 February 1953) was a British soldier and one of the last surviving veterans of the Second Anglo-Afghan War.

== Early life and adulthood ==
Hugh Theodore Pinhey was born on 7 December 1858 in Kolhapur (now in Maharashtra, India) to Robert Hill Pinhey and Mary Anne Pellew (granddaughter of the first Viscount Exmouth), the third of eight children. His father was puisne judge of the High Court of Bombay. One of his younger brothers, Lieutenant Colonel Sir Alexander Fleetwood Pinhey (1861 – 1916), was awarded the Order of the Indian Empire in November 1901. He also had an uncle who served in the First Anglo-Afghan War and was decorated with the Ghuznee Medal.

Pinhey matriculated at Keble College in Oxford, one of the constituent colleges of the University of Oxford, where he began his studies on 15 October 1877, at the age of eighteen. He also trained at the Royal Indian Engineering College. In 1888, Pinhey married Agnes Uric Ingram.

== War in Afghanistan ==
In January 1879, Pinhey was assigned to the telegraphy department as Assistant Superintendent. He was given the rank of lieutenant and assigned to the 4th Bombay Rifle Corps. Pinhey is known for the letter he wrote to his mother over a period of two weeks in which he described the fighting in which he was involved. The British soldier played a major role during the Siege of Kandahar.

== Death ==
Pinhey died, aged 94, in Fleet, Hampshire, England, on 6 February 1953, as reportedly the last surviving veteran of the Second Anglo-Afghan War. (However, the recorded last British soldier of the campaign was Alfred Hawker, who died on 10 December 1962 aged 104.)
