= Royal Indian Engineering College =

Coordinates: 51.4402°N 0.5701°W

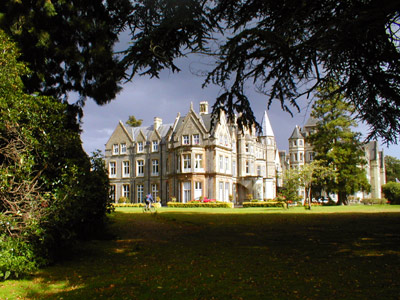
The former Royal Indian Engineering College in 2004

The Royal Indian Engineering College (or RIEC) was a British college of Civil Engineering run by the India Office to train civil engineers for service in the Indian Public Works Department. It was located on the Cooper's Hill estate, near Egham, Surrey. It functioned from 1872 until 1906, when its work was transferred to India.

The college was colloquially referred to as Cooper's Hill and I.C.E. College (I.C.E. being an acronym for Indian Civil Engineering).

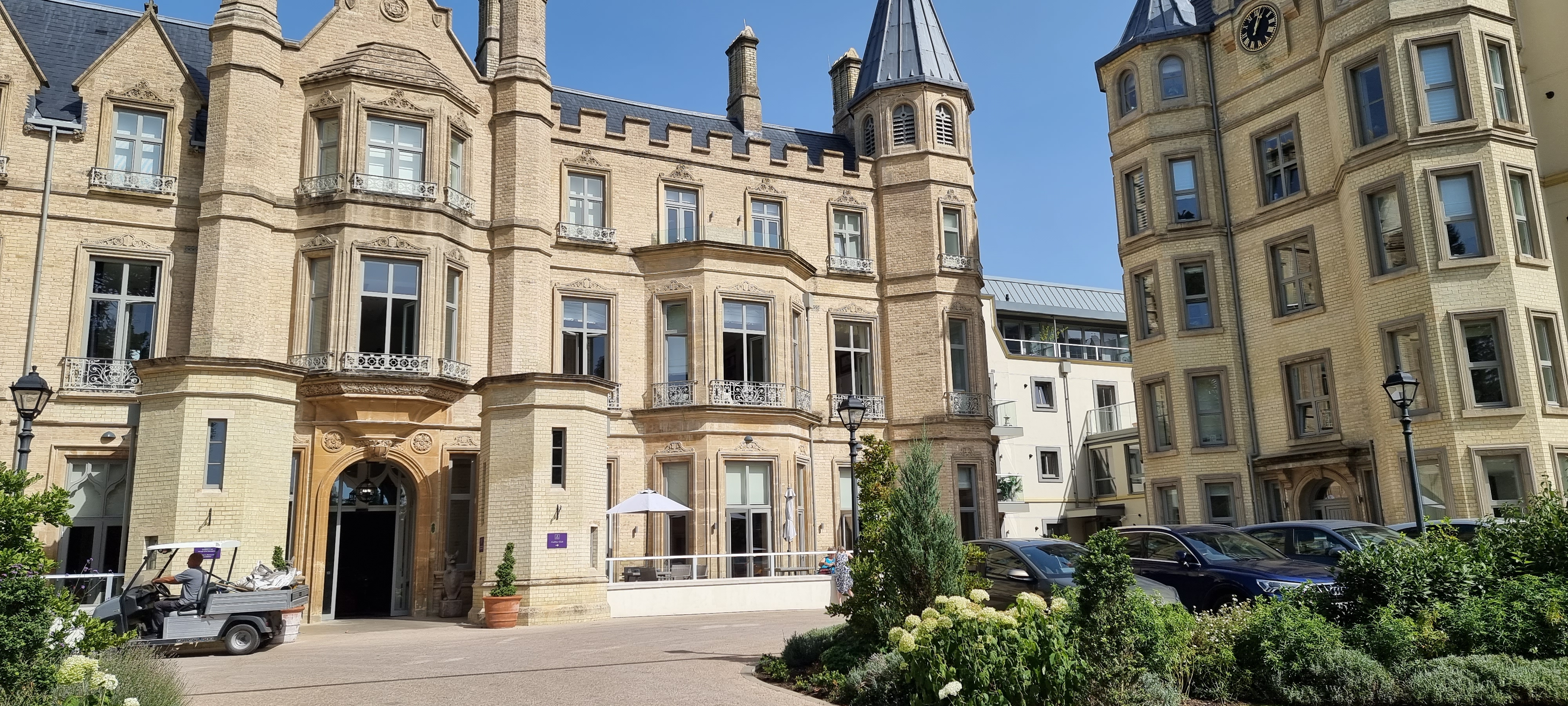
Cooper's Hill House, 2024

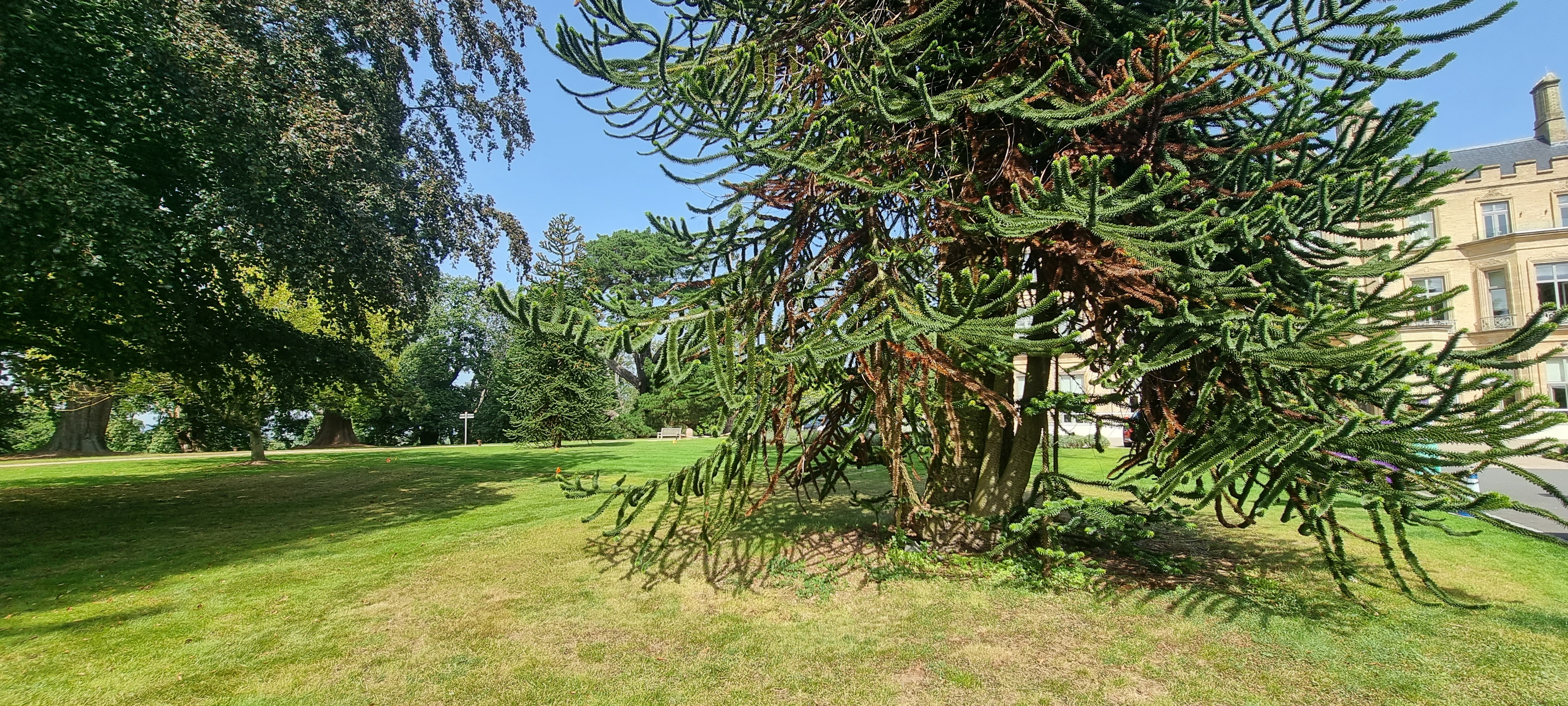
Cooper's Hill grounds

Cooper's Hill nowadays is a luxury retirement village.

== History ==
A Public Works Department was created in India in 1854, with responsibility for the construction of roads, canals and other civil engineering projects. It experienced difficulties in recruiting suitably qualified staff from the United Kingdom, and in 1868 a scheme was proposed for a dedicated training college in England. The chief advocate of this scheme, and effective founder of the college, was Sir George Tomkyns Chesney. The India Office bought the Cooper's Hill estate for £55,000 in 1870; and the college was formally opened on 5 August 1872, with Chesney as its first President.

The college educated about 50 students a year, who paid fees of £150 each. The curriculum included pure and applied mathematics, construction, architectural design, surveying, mechanical drawing, geometry, physics, geology, accounts, Hindustani, and the history and geography of India.

By the late 1870s the college was training more civil engineers than were required in India; but, rather than scaling down its activities, Chesney broadened them. From 1878, the college began to train candidates for the Indian Telegraph Department. From 1881, it began to train candidates for non-Indian services, such as the Royal Engineers, the Egyptian Government, and the Uganda Railway. In 1885, the first forestry school in England was established at Cooper's Hill, with William Schlich as the founding director.

In the face of competition from new training facilities for engineers elsewhere (notably at the new "redbrick" universities), the college closed on 13 October 1906.

== Architecture ==
The principal building at Cooper's Hill was a mansion house erected in c.1865 for the disgraced company promoter, Baron Albert Grant, to a semi-Gothic design by F. & H. Francis. The conversion of the house for educational use, the design of the interiors, and the addition of a new south wing (including a chapel) were undertaken by the architect Sir Matthew Digby Wyatt.

== Rugby football team ==
In its day, the college's rugby union team, referred to by its opponents as "Cooper's Hill", was one of the most prominent rugby clubs in England. In the 1870s, it produced a number of famous international players including Stephen Finney, Petley Price, W. C. Hutchinson, N. F. Macleod, and F. D. Fowler.

By the 1890s, the team was deemed of medium strength, and a long way behind the form of its heyday. This was put down to boys leaving school earlier than they had previously, thus the team became composed of men who were physically smaller in stature and physique than their predecessors. It boasted the following internationals who played for their countries whilst attending the college:

- (England) Stephen Finney (first capped 1872)
- (England) Henry Marsh (first capped 1873)
- (Scotland) John Davidson (first capped 1873)
- (England) Josiah Edward Paul (first capped 1875)
- (England) W. C. Hutchinson (first capped 1876)
- (England) P. L. A. Price (first capped 1877)
- (England) F. D. Fowler (first capped 1878)
- (England) Ernest Frederick Dawson (first capped 1878)
- (England) Norman McLeod (first capped 1879)

== After closure ==
After the college moved out in 1906, the buildings stood empty until bought in 1911 by Baroness Cheylesmore for use as a private home. The house became vacant again in 1925 after Lord Cheylesmore was killed in a car crash. It was purchased in 1938 by the London County Council as an emergency headquarters and housed the Comptrollers, Records, Motor-licensing and part of the Education departments. In September 1939, shortly after the start of the Second World War, the "Eros" statue from the Shaftesbury Memorial Fountain was taken from Piccadilly Circus to Coopers Hill for safekeeping and stored in a room still there known as the "Eros Room", until its return in 1947.

The site became the Cooper’s Hill Emergency Training College from 1946 until 1951. In that year, the Shoreditch College of Education, a teacher's college specialising in handicraft education, transferred to Coopers Hill from their site in Hoxton. In 1980, the college merged with Brunel University and the site was renamed Runnymede Campus, housing the education and design departments, which it occupied until 2007. The site was acquired in 2016 by the Audley Group for conversion into a retirement village of 78 luxury apartments which opened in 2019.

== Cultural references ==
- The college is mentioned by Rudyard Kipling in his novel Stalky & Co. (1899): one of the main characters, M'Turk, following schooling at the fictionalised United Services College, is supposed to be "going up for Cooper's Hill".

== Presidents ==
- Lt Col. Sir George Tomkyns Chesney, 1872–1880
- Gen. Sir Alexander Taylor, 1880–1896
- Col. John Pennycuick, 1896–1900
- Col. Sir John Walter Ottley, 1900–1906

== Other staff ==
Staff at the college included:

- Calcott Reilly, Professor of Construction, 1872–1897
- William Cawthorne Unwin, Professor of Hydraulics and Mechanics, 1872–1884
- Arthur Herbert Church, Lecturer in Organic Chemistry, 1888–1900
- Peter Martin Duncan, Lecturer in Geology and Mineralogy, 1872–1890
- Harry Govier Seeley, Lecturer in Geology and Mineralogy, 1890–1905
- Lt George Sydenham Clarke, Professor of Geometrical Drawing, 1871–1880
- Wilhelm Philipp Daniel Schlich, Professor of Forestry, 1885–1905
- Alfred Lodge, Professor of Mathematics, 1884-1904
- Joseph Wolstenholme, Professor of Mathematics, 1871–1889
- John Burrough, School chaplain 1903-06.
- Herbert McLeod, Professor of Chemistry
- Charles Alfred Barber, botanist
- William H. White, architecture
- George Minchin, Professor of Applied Mathematics
- Dietrich Brandis
- Harry Marshall Ward, botanist
- Horace Bell (engineer)

== Alumni ==
- Ali Nawaz Jung Bahadur, engineer
- George Charles Beresford, photographer
- Herbert George Billson, forester
- John Boyle, politician
- David Carnegie, explorer
- Lt Col Sir Peter Clutterbuck, soldier and forester
- George Coles, cricketer
- John Davidson, rugby union player
- Stephen Finney, rugby union international
- Cecil Ernest Claude Fischer, botanist
- Frederick Gebbie, civil engineer
- Henry Guinness, civil engineer and banker
- Charlton Harrison, civil engineer
- William Hutchinson, rugby union international
- Christopher Ling, cricketer
- Francis McClean, civil engineer and pioneer aviator
- Henry Marash, rugby union international
- Arthur Edward Osmaston, naturalist
- Bertram Beresford Osmaston, forester
- Josiah Edward Paul, rugby union international
- Gervas Pierrepont, 6th Earl Manvers, soldier
- Hugh Theodore Pinhey, soldier
- Petley Price, rugby union international
- Frederick Campbell Rose, civil engineer
- Robert Scott Troup, forester
- Frederick Sprott, cricketer and engineer
- John Claude White, engineer and photographer
- Trevredyn Rashleigh Wynne, railway executive

== See also ==
- List of historic schools of forestry
- East India Company College
- Addiscombe Military Seminary
