= John Birkett (rugby union) =

English rugby union player

- Born: John Guy Giberne Birkett; 27 December 1884 Richmond, London
- Died: 16 October 1967 (aged 82) Cuckfield
- School: Haileybury and Imperial Service College

Rugby union career
- Position: Centre
Senior career
| Years | Team | Apps | (Points) |
- Harlequins
International career
| Years | Team | Apps | (Points) |
| 1906-1912 | England | 21 | |

John Guy Giberne Birkett (27 December 1884 – 16 October 1967) was an English international rugby union player who played for England between 1906 and 1912, and also captained the side on more than one occasion. He also has the distinction of scoring the first ever try at Twickenham Stadium, echoing the feat of his father who in 1871, in the first ever international rugby match scored England's first ever try.

== Early life ==
John Guy Giberne Birkett was born in Richmond, Surrey on 27 December 1884. He was the son of Lizette Crunden and Reg Birkett. His father had played for England as an association footballer as well as playing in England's first international rugby match in 1871. He had an older brother, Gerald (born 1883), and his uncle was another rugby international, Louis Birkett. John attended Haileybury and Imperial Service College.

== Rugby career ==
Birkett initially regarded himself as a half-back. After attending the trials for Harlequins in 1905 on Wandsworth Common he was selected for the team. At the time, the Harlequins talisman, Adrian Stoop, was beginning to implement a change in the way in which back play was structured and which itself would become the template for how rugby union backlines are organised today. Stoop wanted to see the ball moved quickly across the three-quarters and out to the wings, for a quicker style of play. The ball would leave the forwards via a position Stoop termed the scrum-half and then outward to the wings. Stoop saw in Birkett the ideal build and skills needed for a centre in this new format, and this became Birkett's position for the rest of his career. Birkett came into the England side in 1906 after England had suffered a seven match losing run. Playing Scotland at Inverleith, Birkett took up his position at centre and with Stoop also in the side as half-back the first glimmers of the new back play were seen at international level. In this match England overcame Scotland, putting an end to their losing streak and seeing tries scored on both wings. Five days later in Paris, Birkett was involved in the first England-France match, again a win for England. Birkett became a regular in the England side and in 1908 captained the side to a defeat against Wales in Bristol. He lost the captaincy but kept his place and in the 1910 and 1911 Five Nations Championships he was captain on four consecutive occasions. The 1910 championship was also one in which England became the first Five Nations champions, and Birkett scored twice in the match against Scotland. During his international career he played 21 times for England, and at the time of his final match in Paris this was England's record cap holder. He was also the record try scorer with ten. Ironically, he never captained his club-side. However, he never lost his place in the Harlequins side and was part of the generation that witnessed the move to the new Twickenham Stadium. He played in the inaugural match on 2 October 1909, at what is now the home of English rugby. In this match he had the distinction of scoring the first try at the new stadium, echoing his father's distinction of having scored England's first ever try in 1871.

== Career and later life ==
In World War One he was a captain in the Royal Field Artillery and was mentioned in dispatches 18 times. He was also decorated with the Order of the Crown of Italy, 5th Class (Knight). In 1915 he married Elsie Allen in Chertsey. They had a son, John Brian who was born on 2 October 1916 and who would later become a brigadier and serve in the Second World War. John Birkett died on 16 October 1967, which was registered in Cuckfield.

Sporting positions
| Preceded by Thomas Kelly; Edgar Mobbs | English National Rugby Union Captain; Jan 1908; Mar 1910 – Feb 1911 | Succeeded by Curly Hammond; Anthony Gotley |
