= John Davidson (rugby union) =

Scotland international rugby union player

- Born: John Paton Davidson; 3 September 1851 Banchory, Aberdeenshire, Scotland
- Died: 21 September 1919 (aged 68)

Rugby union career
- Position: Forward
Amateur team(s)
Years	Team	Apps	(Points)
- RIE College RFC
International career
Years	Team	Apps	(Points)
1873-74	Scotland	2	(0)

John Davidson (3 September 1851 – 19 September 1919) was a Scottish international rugby union player who played for RIE College RFC in Surrey, England.

Born in Banchory in 1851, Davidson played as a Forward.

Davidson played in two early rugby union international matches for Scotland against England in 1873 and 1874.
