= Norman McLeod (rugby union) =

Norman Frederick McLeod
- Born: 30 June 1856 Madras, Madras Presidency, British India
- Died: 20 April 1921 (aged 64) South Kensington, Middlesex, England
- School: Clifton College
- University: Royal Indian Engineering College, Cooper's Hill

Rugby union career
- Position: Forward
Amateur team(s)
Years	Team	Apps	(Points)
–	RIE College RFC		
–	Richmond F.C.		
International career
Years	Team	Apps	(Points)
1879	England	2	(0)

Norman Frederick McLeod (30 June 1856 – 20 April 1921) was an English rugby union forward who represented the England national side in 1879. He later served as an engineer in the Indian Public Works Department.

== Early life and education ==
McLeod was born on 30 June 1856 in Madras, Madras Presidency, British India, the son of Lieutenant-General William Couperus McLeod and Jane Anne MacLeod. He was baptised in Madras on 12 November 1856.

He was educated at Clifton College. In 1875 he gained admission to the Royal Indian Engineering College at Cooper's Hill, placing second in the entrance examination list.

== Rugby career ==
While a student at Cooper's Hill, McLeod played for the Royal Indian Engineering College XV. He later played at club level for Richmond F.C., appearing in fixtures during the 1878–79 season.

He was selected for England in 1879 and won his first international cap on 10 March 1879 against Scotland at Raeburn Place, Edinburgh. He then played in the match against Ireland on 24 March 1879.

== Engineering career ==
McLeod entered the Indian Public Works Department in 1878. He served in the Irrigation Branch in the North-Western Provinces and Oudh, including work on the Ganges Canal.

In 1887 he was granted eighteen months’ furlough from his post in the Meerut Division of the Ganges Canal. In 1892 he was appointed to officiate as Executive Engineer, North Division, Ganges Canal. In 1897 he was appointed Superintendent of Works, Fatehpur Division, Lower Ganges Canal.

== Later life and death ==
McLeod was associated with the East India United Service Club, St James's Square, London.

He died on 20 April 1921 at 99 Barkston Gardens, South Kensington, Middlesex. He was buried at Brompton Cemetery on 25 April 1921.
