= Edward Nash (rugby union) =

England international rugby union player

- Full name: Edward Henry Nash
- Born: 20 December 1853 Eton, England
- Died: 18 September 1932 (aged 78) Beaconsfield, England

Rugby union career
- Position: Halfback
International career
| Years | Team | Apps | (Points) |
| 1875 | England | 1 | |

Edward Henry Nash (20 December 1853 – 18 September 1932) was an English international rugby union player.

Nash, a native of Slough, was the cricket and rugby captain at Rugby School. He undertook further studies at Trinity College, Oxford, where he was also involved in rowing.

A halfback, Nash gained an England cap in 1875, contributing a drop goal in a win over Ireland at Kennington Oval. The following season, Nash won selection for a match with Scotland, but was unable to play due to university commitments.

Nash later served as president of the country's Hockey Association, which he had helped found.

== See also ==
- List of England national rugby union players
