= James Reid (rugby, born 1851) =

Scotland international rugby union player

James Reid (24 February 1851–29 July 1908) was a Scottish rugby football player.

He was capped five times for Scotland between 1874 and 1877. He also played for Edinburgh Wanderers.

He was the brother of Charles Reid ("Hippo") who was also capped for Scotland.
