= Reg Birkett =

English footballer (1849–1898)

Reginald Halsey Birkett (28 March 1849 – 30 June 1898) was an English footballer who played for Clapham Rovers, as well as the England national side. He also played international rugby union for England in 1871, in the first international rugby match. In this match he scored England's first try.

In 1898, Birkett was suffering from diphtheria. In an apparent state of delirium, he leapt from a window and fell 20 ft (6.1 m) to his death. A verdict of suicide whilst delirious was returned by the inquest on his death.

== Early life ==
Reginald Halsey Birkett was born in London on 28 March 1849. He was baptised on 31 May 1849 in St Botolph Bishopsgate in the City of London. His parents were John Birkett (born 1816, Hackney, London) a surgeon, and Lucy Matilda Janson (born 1823 in Tottenham, London). Reginald got his middle name, Halsey, from his maternal grandfather Halsey Janson. He had a number of brothers and sisters including Percival (born 1851), Evelyn (born 1864), Arthus (born 1861) and Louis (born 1853).

He was educated at William Jacob's school in Calne and Lancing College, for whom he later played club football. His brother was another rugby international, Louis Birkett.

== Rugby career ==
Reg Birkett
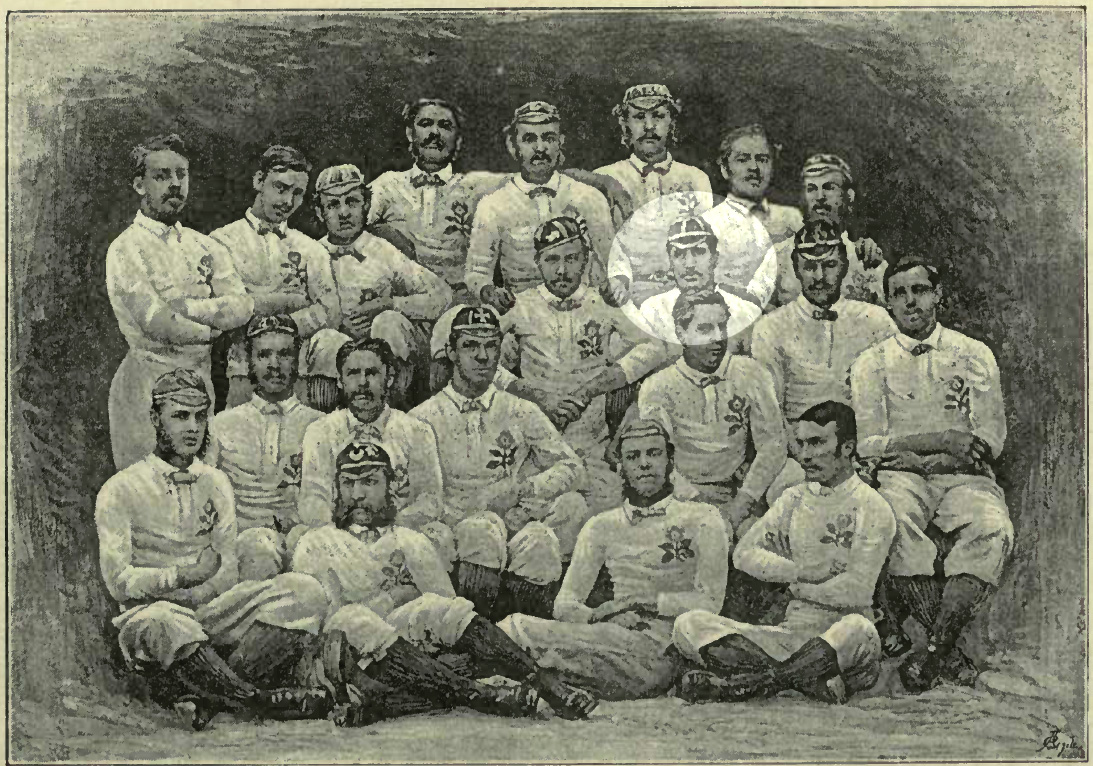
- 1871 England rugby squad with Birkett highlighted
- Born: 28 March 1849 London, England
- Died: 30 June 1898 (aged 49) Wimbledon, London
- School: William Jacob's school in Calne; Lancing College

Rugby union career
- Position: Forward
Senior career
Years	Team	Apps	(Points)
- Clapham Rovers
International career
Years	Team	Apps	(Points)
1871–1877	England	4	

Birkett was an important figure in the formation of the Rugby Football Union as well. Clapham Rovers were one of the twenty-one London and suburban football clubs that followed Rugby School rules that assembled at the Pall Mall Restaurant in Regent Street and formed the Rugby Football Union on 26 January 1871 and Birkett was not only present but also became one of the thirteen original committee members.

Birkett was selected for the first international rugby match for England vs Scotland in 1871. In this match he scored England's first ever try, although at the time a try did not gain points, but rather was the means by which a team was granted the opportunity of converting the try into a point scoring goal. His brother Louis and his son John later also played for England. Of his rugby ability a near contemporary account states that he "was very useful both forward and behind the scrummage, and had plenty of pace."

== Football career ==
Reg Birkett

Personal information
- Full name: Reginald Halsey Birkett
- Date of birth: 28 March 1849
- Place of birth: London, England
- Date of death: 30 June 1898 (aged 49)
- Position: Goalkeeper

Senior career*
Years	Team	Apps	(Gls)
- Clapham Rovers

International career
1879	England	1	(0)
- * Club domestic league appearances and goals

When Reg Birkett was playing association football and rugby football, the two codes had not long been separated and the term 'football' could still apply to either. Whilst at school, he played both codes and was a member of Lancing's senior soccer team in 1866–67. He then joined Lancing Old Boys, and then on to Clapham Rovers FC, a club that played both codes of football and had distinguished itself in both. Birkett also represented Surrey FC.

In 1879, Birkett had a season in which he both reached the FA Cup final and was selected to play for England. In the 1879 FA Cup Final, played at Kennington Oval on 29 March 1879, Clapham Rovers were runners-up to Old Etonians F.C. Birkett was the goalkeeper and was beaten at close range by a shot from Charles Clerke. However, despite letting in the only goal of the match, Birkett's prowess as a keeper was well respected and he went on to be selected for the England vs Scotland friendly international a week later, on the same ground. Despite conceding four goals, he was on the winning side, England prevailing 5-4.

The following year, Clapham Rovers once again made it to the FA Cup final. The opposition this time was Oxford University A.F.C. Clopton Lloyd-Jones scored for Clapham and combined with Birkett's clean sheet, Clapham prevailed 1-0.

== Personal life and death ==
Reginald married Lizette Crunden in 1881 in Cuckfield, West Sussex. They had at least two sons, Gerald (born 1883) and John (who would later captain the England rugby union side) (born 1884).

A skin and fur broker by profession, he died at the age of 49 at his Wimbledon home following an accident; whilst suffering from diphtheria, he leapt from a window while being helped into his bed and fell 20 ft (6.1 m) to his death – at the inquest, a verdict of suicide whilst delirious was returned.

== Honours ==
Clapham Rovers

- FA Cup winner: 1880
- FA Cup runner-up: 1879
