= William Hutchinson (rugby, born 1856) =

England international rugby union player

- Born: William Charles Hutchinson; 1856
- Died: 1880 (aged 23–24) India

Rugby union career
- Position: Halfback
Senior career
Years	Team	Apps	(Points)
- RIE College RFC
International career
Years	Team	Apps	(Points)
1876–1877	England	2	(Goals:0; Tries:2)

William Hutchinson (1856–1880) was a rugby union international who represented England from 1876 to 1877.

== Early life ==
William Hutchinson was born on 1856 in .

== Rugby union career ==
Hutchinson attended and played his club rugby for the Royal Indian Engineering College (Cooper's Hill). He was selected to play for England in 1876 and made his international debut on 6 March 1876 at The Oval in the England vs Scotland match. His debut was described as "a very brilliant first appearance" and he was described as a first-rate half-back, a quick starter, with a very fair amount of pace, an unselfish player, and good tackle. His second and final match was on 5 February 1877 at The Oval in the England vs Ireland match. This match was the first international to be played with fifteen a-side, making Hutchinson one of the few players to have played international matches in both 20 and 15 a-side eras. Eight minutes into the match Hutchinson ran in for a try and later scored again, making him England's record try scorer at that point.

Hutchinson's military career was to take him to India and it was this which curtailed his rugby playing career. Whilst in India, he died in 1880.
