= Maldon District Council elections =

Local government elections in Essex, England

Maldon District Council in Essex, England is elected every four years.

== Council elections ==
The table below indicates the seat composition of the council following the conclusion of each election.

Year	Conservative	Labour	Liberal Democrats (Note: Includes totals for the predecessors of the Liberal Democrats, the Liberal Party and SDP (both of which participated in the Alliance).)	Independents & Others	Council control after election
Local government reorganisation; council established (30 seats)
1973	11	4	3	12	No overall control
1976	20	1	0	9	Conservative
New ward boundaries (30 seats)
1979	18	2	3	7	Conservative
1983	15	1	9	5	No overall control
1987	14	1	11	4	No overall control
1991	13	1	6	10	No overall control
1995	12	7	1	10	No overall control
1999	17	6	0	7	Conservative
New ward boundaries (31 seats)
2003	21	2	0	8	Conservative
2007	26	0	0	5	Conservative
2011	28	0	0	3	Conservative
2015	28	0	0	3 (Note: Including 1 UKIP)	Conservative
2019	17	0	0	14	Conservative
2023	10	1	6	14 (Note: Including 7 Maldon District Independent Group)	No overall control

== Results maps ==
1979 results map

1983 results map

1987 results map

1991 results map

1995 results map

1999 results map

2003 results map

2007 results map

2011 results map

2015 results map

2019 results map

2023 results map

== By-election results ==
A by-election occurs when seats become vacant between council elections. Below is a summary of by-elections from 1983 onwards. Full by-election results are listed under the last regular election preceding the by-election and can be found by clicking on the ward name.

=== 1983-1994 ===
Ward	Date	Incumbent party	Winning party
Heybridge West	10 July 1986	Alliance	Alliance
Heybridge West	24 November 1988	SLD	SLD
Maldon East	11 March 1993	Liberal Democrats	Independent
Heybridge West	20 May 1993	Liberal Democrats	Independent
Goldhanger	29 July 1993	Conservative	Conservative

=== 1995-2006 ===
Ward	Date	Incumbent party	Winning party
St Lawrence	7 June 2001	Conservative	Conservative
Maldon North West	21 February 2002	Labour	Conservative
Maldon West	24 November 2005	Conservative	Conservative

=== 2007-2018 ===
Ward	Date	Incumbent party	Winning party
Burnham-on-Crouch North	7 June 2007	Independent	Independent
Burnham-on-Crouch North	7 June 2007	Conservative	Conservative
Maldon North	7 August 2008	Conservative	Conservative
Tollesbury	5 July 2012	Conservative	Labour
Maldon West	8 December 2016	Conservative	Independent

=== 2019-present ===
Ward	Date	Incumbent party	Winning party
Heybridge East	6 May 2021	Conservative	Conservative
Tollesbury	6 May 2021	Conservative	Independent
Wickham Bishops & Woodham	24 February 2022	Conservative	Conservative
Heybridge West	14 April 2022	Independent	Liberal Democrats
Maldon North	27 March 2025	Conservative	Conservative
Maldon West	29 May 2025	MDIG	Liberal Democrats
