= 2027 Maldon District Council election =

2027 English local government election

- 6 May 2027

All 31 seats to Maldon District Council 16 seats needed for a majority
Leader	Simon Morgan	John Driver
Party	Conservative	Liberal Democrats	MDIG
Leader's seat	Wickham Bishops & Woodham	Maldon West
Last election	10 seats, 33.9%	6 seats, 21.6%	7 seats, 20.4%
Current seats	10	6	6
Leader			Una Siddall-Norman
Party	Independent	Reform	Labour
Leader's seat			Burnham-on-Crouch North
Last election	7 seats, 15.5%	Did not stand	1 seat, 7.0%
Current seats	5	2	1
Leader	Vanessa Bell
Party	Party of Women
Leader's seat	Burnham-on-Crouch South
Last election	Did not stand
Current seats	1
Incumbent Leader
Simon Morgan
Conservative
No overall control (Note: Conservative minority.)

The 2027 Maldon District Council election will be held on 6 May 2027 to elect members of Maldon District Council in Essex, England. This will be on the same day as other local elections held across the United Kingdom.

== Background ==
=== Local government reorganisation ===
Due to proposed structural changes to local government in England, the 2023 election would have been the final election to the council before it was abolished and replaced by Mid Essex Council, a unitary authority. However, on 7 September 2026, the government announced it was withdrawing plans for the planned restructuring pending review. Following this announcement, local elections due to be held in 2027 under the existing local electoral calendar would proceed.

== Summary ==
=== Election result ===
2027 Maldon District Council election
Party	Candidates	Seats	Gains	Losses	Net gain/loss	Seats %	Votes %	Votes	+/−
Conservative									
Liberal Democrats									
MDIG									
Independent									
Reform									
Labour									
Party of Women									
