= 2003 Maldon District Council election =

2003 English local election

- 1 May 2003

All 31 seats to Maldon District Council 16 seats needed for a majority

	First party	Second party
Party	Conservative	Democratic Alliance
Seats won	21	4
Seat change	▲4	▲4
Popular vote	12,174	3,579
Percentage	53.2%	15.7%
Swing	▲5.3%	N/A
	Third party	Fourth party
Party	Independent	Labour
Seats won	4	2
Seat change	▼3	▼4
Popular vote	2,664	2,728
Percentage	11.7%	11.9%
Swing	▼8.9%	▼13.5%
Control before election
Conservative
Control after election
Conservative

The 2003 Maldon District Council election took place on 1 May 2003 to elect members of Maldon District Council in Essex, England. This was on the same day as other local elections.

== Summary ==
=== Election result ===
2003 Maldon District Council election
Party	Candidates	Seats	Gains	Losses	Net gain/loss	Seats %	Votes %	Votes	+/−
Conservative	29	21	N/A	N/A	▲4	67.7	53.2	12,174	+5.3
Democratic Alliance	9	4	N/A	N/A	▲4	12.9	15.7	3,579	N/A
Independent	6	4	N/A	N/A	▼3	12.9	11.7	2,664	–8.9
Labour	13	2	N/A	N/A	▼4	6.5	11.9	2,728	–13.5
Green	8	0	N/A	N/A	Steady	0.0	7.5	1,718	+3.8

== Ward results ==
Incumbent councillors standing for re-election are marked with an asterisk (*). Changes in seats do not take into account by-elections or defections.

=== Althorne ===
Althorne (2 seats)
Party	Candidate	Votes	%	±%
Conservative	Robert Boyce*	473	47.7	
Democratic Alliance	Michael Helm	406	41.0	
Democratic Alliance	Richard French	379	38.2	
Conservative	Nigel Butt	368	37.1	
Labour	Christine Lovett	158	15.9	
Turnout		~991	32.5	
Registered electors		3,048		
Conservative hold				
Democratic Alliance win (new seat)				

=== Burnham-on-Crouch North ===
Burnham-on-Crouch North (2 seats)
Party	Candidate	Votes	%	±%
Independent	Michael Wood*	493	50.0	
Conservative	John Smith*	407	41.3	
Conservative	Neil Pudney	359	36.4	
Labour	Pauline Wells	273	27.7	
Labour	Mary Feakins	190	19.3	
Turnout		~986	33.7	
Registered electors		2,925		
Independent hold				
Conservative win (new seat)				

=== Burnham-on-Crouch South ===
Burnham-on-Crouch South (2 seats)
Party	Candidate	Votes	%	±%
Conservative	Peter Elliott	486	51.8	
Labour	Una Norman*	392	41.7	
Conservative	Carole Noble	391	41.6	
Labour	Terence Quinlan	237	25.2	
Green	Mark Ellis	200	21.3	
Turnout		~939	31.0	
Registered electors		3,029		
Conservative hold				
Labour hold				

=== Great Totham ===
Great Totham (2 seats)
Party	Candidate	Votes	%	±%
Conservative	Frank Delderfield*	699	74.8	
Conservative	Rodney Bass*	689	73.8	
Green	Robert King	251	26.9	
Turnout		~934	33.8	
Registered electors		2,762		
Conservative hold				
Conservative hold				

=== Heybridge East ===
Heybridge East (2 seats)
Party	Candidate	Votes	%	±%
Conservative	Alison Warr	Unopposed		
Conservative	Bryan Harker*	Unopposed		
Registered electors		2,891		
Conservative hold				
Conservative win (new seat)				

=== Heybridge West ===
Heybridge West (2 seats)
Party	Candidate	Votes	%	±%
Conservative	Sheila Rosewarne*	383	55.7	
Conservative	Alan Cheshire*	352	51.2	
Democratic Alliance	Thomas Benson	174	25.3	
Labour	Valerie Quinlan	157	22.8	
Green	Michael Cole	150	21.8	
Turnout		~688	25.0	
Registered electors		2,754		
Conservative hold				
Conservative hold				

=== Maldon East ===
Maldon East
Party	Candidate	Votes	%	±%
Labour	Paul Rew*	231	58.2	
Conservative	Stephen Savage	166	41.8	
Majority		65	16.4	
Turnout		397	25.8	
Registered electors		1,543		
Labour hold		Swing		

=== Maldon North ===
Maldon North (2 seats)
Party	Candidate	Votes	%
Democratic Alliance	William Stichbury	529	57.9
Conservative	Brian Mead*	493	53.9
Conservative	Dennis Keighley*	368	40.3
Turnout		~914	30.6
Registered electors		2,987	
Democratic Alliance win (new seat)			
Conservative win (new seat)			

=== Maldon South ===
Maldon South (2 seats)
Party	Candidate	Votes	%	±%
Conservative	Brenda Keighley	386	54.8	
Conservative	Andrew Cain	349	49.5	
Labour	Peter Roberts*	247	35.0	
Green	Liz Grimwade	206	29.2	
Turnout		~705	23.7	
Registered electors		2,973		
Conservative hold				
Conservative gain from Labour				

=== Maldon West ===
Maldon West (2 seats)
Party	Candidate	Votes	%
Conservative	Thomas Kelly*	521	59.0
Conservative	William Prior	435	49.3
Labour	Michael Bentley	309	35.0
Green	Janet Carden	254	28.8
Turnout		~883	29.1
Registered electors		3,033	
Conservative win (new seat)			
Conservative win (new seat)			

=== Mayland ===
Mayland (2 seats)
Party	Candidate	Votes	%
Conservative	Penelope Channer*	680	66.8
Conservative	Carol Ellmers*	567	55.7
Democratic Alliance	David Horner	360	35.4
Green	Sylvia Izzard	144	14.1
Labour	Norman Hunt	116	11.4
Turnout		~1,018	35.4
Registered electors		2,877	
Conservative win (new seat)			
Conservative win (new seat)			

=== Purleigh ===
Purleigh (2 seats)
Party	Candidate	Votes	%	±%
Conservative	John Archer*	546	56.3	
Independent	Lawrence Cooper*	436	45.0	
Democratic Alliance	Robert Roe	311	32.1	
Labour	Pauline Hallanzy	114	11.8	
Turnout		~969	38.0	
Registered electors		2,551		
Conservative win (new seat)				
Independent hold				

=== Southminster ===
Southminster (2 seats)
Party	Candidate	Votes	%	±%
Independent	Brian Beale*	556	69.4	
Democratic Alliance	Paulette Ryall	460	57.4	
Conservative	Gordon Ellmers	259	32.3	
Labour	Rodney Eastham	187	23.3	
Turnout		~801	27.1	
Registered electors		2,955		
Independent hold				
Democratic Alliance gain from Labour				

=== Tillingham ===
Tillingham
Party	Candidate	Votes	%
Democratic Alliance	Richard Dewick*	460	66.3
Conservative	Anthony Cussen	117	16.9
Labour	Cherie Archer	117	16.9
Majority		343	49.4
Turnout		694	42.4
Registered electors		1,646	
Democratic Alliance win (new seat)			

=== Tollesbury ===
Tollesbury
Party	Candidate	Votes	%	±%
Independent	Ronald Laurie*	315	62.7	
Conservative	Arthur Mullin	187	37.3	
Majority		128	25.4	
Turnout		502	32.6	
Registered electors		1,568		
Independent hold		Swing		

=== Tolleshunt D'Arcy ===
Tolleshunt D'Arcy (2 seats)
Party	Candidate	Votes	%	±%
Conservative	Marion Peel*	618	46.3	
Conservative	Robert Long*	563	42.2	
Democratic Alliance	Julian Dawson	500	37.5	
Independent	Barry McGhee*	444	33.3	
Green	Jonathan King	266	19.9	
Turnout		~1,335	44.5	
Registered electors		3,001		
Conservative hold				
Conservative win (new seat)				

=== Wickham Bishops & Woodham ===
Wickham Bishops & Woodham (2 seats)
Party	Candidate	Votes	%
Conservative	David Howse*	698	62.2
Conservative	Sheila Young*	614	54.7
Independent	Graham Finch	420	37.4
Green	Jill Cole	247	22.0
Turnout		~1,122	40.7
Registered electors		2,757	
Conservative win (new seat)			
Conservative win (new seat)			

== By-elections ==
Maldon West By-Election 24 November 2005
Party	Candidate	Votes	%	±%
Conservative	David Williams	212	51.3	+3.2
Democratic Alliance	Graham Hathaway	107	25.9	+25.9
Labour	Michael Bentley	94	22.8	−5.7
Majority		105	25.4	
Turnout		413	13.5	
Conservative hold		Swing		
