= 1999 Maldon District Council election =

1999 English local election

- 6 May 1999

All 30 seats to Maldon District Council 16 seats needed for a majority

| | First party | Second party |
|---|---|---|
| Party | Conservative | Independent |
| Seats won | 17 | 7 |
| Seat change | ▲5 | ▼3 |
| Popular vote | 10,119 | 4,344 |
| Percentage | 47.9% | 20.6% |
| Swing | ▲14.2% | ▼6.0% |
| | Third party | Fourth party |
| Party | Labour | Liberal Democrats |
| Seats won | 6 | 0 |
| Seat change | ▼1 | ▼1 |
| Popular vote | 5,364 | 511 |
| Percentage | 25.4% | 2.4% |
| Swing | ▼3.7% | ▼3.0% |
- Winner of each seat at the 1999 Maldon District Council election.
Control before election
No overall control
Control after election
Conservative

The 1999 Maldon District Council election took place on 6 May 1999 to elect members of Maldon District Council in Essex, England. This was on the same day as other local elections.

== Summary ==
=== Election result ===
1999 Maldon District Council election
| Party | Candidates | Seats | Gains | Losses | Net gain/loss | Seats % | Votes % | Votes | +/− |
|---|---|---|---|---|---|---|---|---|---|
| Conservative | 29 | 17 | 5 | 0 | ▲5 | 56.7 | 47.9 | 10,119 | +14.2 |
| Independent | 11 | 7 | 1 | 4 | ▼3 | 23.3 | 20.6 | 4,344 | –6.0 |
| Labour | 19 | 6 | 2 | 3 | ▼1 | 20.0 | 25.4 | 5,364 | –3.7 |
| Green | 6 | 0 | 0 | 0 | Steady | 0.0 | 3.7 | 790 | –1.5 |
| Liberal Democrats | 3 | 0 | 0 | 1 | ▼1 | 0.0 | 2.4 | 511 | –3.0 |

== Ward results ==
Incumbent councillors standing for re-election are marked with an asterisk (*). Changes in seats do not take into account by-elections or defections.

=== Althorne ===
Althorne
| Party | Candidate | Votes | % | ±% |
|---|---|---|---|---|
| Conservative | R. Boyce* | Unopposed | | |
| Registered electors | | 1,858 | | |
| Conservative hold | | | | |

=== Burnham-on-Crouch North ===
Burnham-on-Crouch North
| Party | Candidate | Votes | % | ±% |
|---|---|---|---|---|
| Independent | M. Wood* | 336 | 45.4 | |
| Conservative | D. Greaves | 227 | 30.7 | |
| Labour | P. Wells | 177 | 23.9 | |
| Majority | | 109 | 14.7 | |
| Turnout | | 740 | 32.3 | |
| Registered electors | | 2,316 | | |
| Independent hold | | Swing | | |

=== Burnham-on-Crouch South ===
Burnham-on-Crouch South (3 seats)
| Party | Candidate | Votes | % | ±% |
|---|---|---|---|---|
| Conservative | R. Buck | 702 | 59.8 | |
| Labour | U. Norman | 504 | 42.9 | |
| Conservative | J. Smith* | 499 | 42.5 | |
| Conservative | P. Elliott | 415 | 35.3 | |
| Independent | T. Martin* | 403 | 34.3 | |
| Labour | T. Quinlan* | 384 | 32.7 | |
| Green | M. Ellis | 204 | 17.4 | |
| Turnout | | ~1,174 | 32.4 | |
| Registered electors | | 3,625 | | |
| Conservative gain from Independent | | | | |
| Labour hold | | | | |
| Conservative hold | | | | |

=== Cold Norton ===
Cold Norton
| Party | Candidate | Votes | % | ±% |
|---|---|---|---|---|
| Conservative | J. Archer* | 460 | 70.8 | |
| Labour | P. Guppy | 190 | 29.2 | |
| Majority | | 270 | 41.6 | |
| Turnout | | 650 | 40.5 | |
| Registered electors | | 1,609 | | |
| Conservative hold | | Swing | | |

=== Goldhanger ===
Goldhanger
| Party | Candidate | Votes | % | ±% |
|---|---|---|---|---|
| Conservative | R. Long* | 415 | 70.5 | |
| Green | J. King | 174 | 29.5 | |
| Majority | | 241 | 40.9 | |
| Turnout | | 589 | 46.2 | |
| Registered electors | | 1,279 | | |
| Conservative hold | | Swing | | |

=== Great Totham ===
Great Totham (2 seats)
| Party | Candidate | Votes | % | ±% |
|---|---|---|---|---|
| Conservative | F. Delderfield* | 766 | 72.8 | |
| Conservative | R. Bass* | 750 | 71.2 | |
| Labour | K. Mehrtens | 268 | 25.4 | |
| Labour | M. Milne | 248 | 23.5 | |
| Turnout | | ~1,054 | 42.0 | |
| Registered electors | | 2,509 | | |
| Conservative hold | | | | |
| Conservative hold | | | | |

=== Heybridge East ===
Heybridge East
| Party | Candidate | Votes | % | ±% |
|---|---|---|---|---|
| Conservative | B. Harker | 491 | 66.8 | |
| Labour | I. Mehrtens* | 244 | 33.2 | |
| Majority | | 247 | 33.6 | |
| Turnout | | 735 | 26.4 | |
| Registered electors | | 2,803 | | |
| Conservative gain from Labour | | Swing | | |

=== Heybridge West ===
Heybridge West (2 seats)
| Party | Candidate | Votes | % | ±% |
|---|---|---|---|---|
| Conservative | S. Rosewarne | 289 | 47.7 | |
| Conservative | A. Cheshire | 244 | 40.3 | |
| Labour | M. Bentley | 226 | 37.3 | |
| Labour | A. Josselyn | 197 | 32.5 | |
| Green | M. Cole | 157 | 25.9 | |
| Turnout | | ~606 | 25.5 | |
| Registered electors | | 2,376 | | |
| Conservative gain from Liberal Democrats | | | | |
| Conservative gain from Independent | | | | |

=== Maldon East ===
Maldon East (2 seats)
| Party | Candidate | Votes | % | ±% |
|---|---|---|---|---|
| Labour | J. Titmarsh* | 276 | 49.7 | |
| Labour | P. Rew | 267 | 48.0 | |
| Conservative | W. Prior | 188 | 33.8 | |
| Conservative | A. Payne | 170 | 30.6 | |
| Independent | R. Hornett | 85 | 15.3 | |
| Green | J. Harpur | 76 | 13.7 | |
| Turnout | | ~556 | 25.5 | |
| Registered electors | | 2,179 | | |
| Labour hold | | | | |
| Labour gain from Independent | | | | |

=== Maldon North West ===
Maldon North West (3 seats)
| Party | Candidate | Votes | % | ±% |
|---|---|---|---|---|
| Independent | R. Pipe* | 610 | 51.1 | |
| Independent | B. Mead* | 593 | 49.7 | |
| Labour | A. Lamb* | 538 | 45.1 | |
| Labour | C. Danes | 443 | 37.1 | |
| Conservative | P. Nickolls | 333 | 27.9 | |
| Conservative | J. Mann | 254 | 21.3 | |
| Conservative | J. Penny | 222 | 18.6 | |
| Turnout | | ~1,194 | 37.4 | |
| Registered electors | | 3,193 | | |
| Independent hold | | | | |
| Independent gain from Labour | | | | |
| Labour hold | | | | |

=== Maldon South ===
Maldon South (2 seats)
| Party | Candidate | Votes | % | ±% |
|---|---|---|---|---|
| Conservative | T. Kelly | 483 | 42.5 | |
| Labour | P. Roberts* | 336 | 29.6 | |
| Conservative | T. Moss | 316 | 27.8 | |
| Labour | J. Why | 294 | 25.9 | |
| Liberal Democrats | M. Curtis | 204 | 17.9 | |
| Independent | A. Collinson | 202 | 17.8 | |
| Liberal Democrats | E. Downes | 198 | 17.4 | |
| Green | J. Carden | 82 | 7.2 | |
| Turnout | | ~1,137 | 23.2 | |
| Registered electors | | 4,901 | | |
| Conservative gain from Labour | | | | |
| Labour hold | | | | |

=== Purleigh ===
Purleigh
| Party | Candidate | Votes | % | ±% |
|---|---|---|---|---|
| Independent | L. Cooper* | 277 | 60.4 | |
| Conservative | R. Davis | 182 | 39.6 | |
| Majority | | 95 | 20.7 | |
| Turnout | | 459 | 36.2 | |
| Registered electors | | 1,284 | | |
| Independent hold | | Swing | | |

=== Southminster ===
Southminster (2 seats)
| Party | Candidate | Votes | % | ±% |
|---|---|---|---|---|
| Independent | B. Beale* | 561 | 66.2 | |
| Labour | M. Sullivan | 374 | 44.1 | |
| Conservative | B. Cottam* | 220 | 25.9 | |
| Conservative | R. Kehoe | 210 | 24.8 | |
| Turnout | | ~847 | 32.1 | |
| Registered electors | | 2,638 | | |
| Independent hold | | | | |
| Labour gain from Independent | | | | |

=== St. Lawrence ===
St. Lawrence
| Party | Candidate | Votes | % | ±% |
|---|---|---|---|---|
| Conservative | H. Brook* | 309 | 69.6 | |
| Labour | V. Quinlan | 135 | 30.4 | |
| Majority | | 174 | 39.2 | |
| Turnout | | 444 | 36.2 | |
| Registered electors | | 1,231 | | |
| Conservative hold | | Swing | | |

=== The Maylands ===
The Maylands
| Party | Candidate | Votes | % | ±% |
|---|---|---|---|---|
| Conservative | P. Channer* | 491 | 62.3 | |
| Independent | D. Abernethy | 188 | 23.9 | |
| Liberal Democrats | A. Weeks | 109 | 13.8 | |
| Majority | | 303 | 38.4 | |
| Turnout | | 788 | 31.7 | |
| Registered electors | | 2,492 | | |
| Conservative hold | | Swing | | |

=== Tillingham & Bradwell ===
Tillingham & Bradwell
| Party | Candidate | Votes | % | ±% |
|---|---|---|---|---|
| Conservative | R. Dewick* | 412 | 79.7 | |
| Labour | N. Hunt | 105 | 20.3 | |
| Majority | | 307 | 59.4 | |
| Turnout | | 517 | 36.8 | |
| Registered electors | | 1,412 | | |
| Conservative hold | | Swing | | |

=== Tollesbury ===
Tollesbury (2 seats)
| Party | Candidate | Votes | % | ±% |
|---|---|---|---|---|
| Independent | B. McGhee* | 556 | 74.8 | |
| Independent | R. Laurie* | 533 | 71.7 | |
| Conservative | G. Munson | 206 | 27.7 | |
| Turnout | | ~742 | 35.7 | |
| Registered electors | | 2,079 | | |
| Independent hold | | | | |
| Independent hold | | | | |

=== Tolleshunt D'Arcy ===
Tolleshunt D'Arcy
| Party | Candidate | Votes | % | ±% |
|---|---|---|---|---|
| Conservative | M. Peel* | Unopposed | | |
| Registered electors | | 1,509 | | |
| Conservative hold | | | | |

=== Wickham Bishops ===
Wickham Bishops
| Party | Candidate | Votes | % | ±% |
|---|---|---|---|---|
| Conservative | D. Howse* | 563 | 78.1 | |
| Labour | G. Baker | 158 | 21.9 | |
| Majority | | 405 | 56.2 | |
| Turnout | | 721 | 45.0 | |
| Registered electors | | 1,612 | | |
| Conservative hold | | Swing | | |

=== Woodham ===
Woodham
| Party | Candidate | Votes | % | ±% |
|---|---|---|---|---|
| Conservative | S. Young* | 302 | 75.7 | |
| Green | J. Cole | 97 | 24.3 | |
| Majority | | 205 | 51.4 | |
| Turnout | | 399 | 33.0 | |
| Registered electors | | 1,216 | | |
| Conservative hold | | Swing | | |

== By-elections ==
St Lawrence By-Election 7 June 2001
| Party | Candidate | Votes | % | ±% |
|---|---|---|---|---|
| Conservative | | unopposed | | |
| Conservative hold | | Swing | | |

Maldon North West By-Election 21 February 2002
| Party | Candidate | Votes | % | ±% |
|---|---|---|---|---|
| Conservative | | 370 | 59.9 | +37.4 |
| Labour | | 157 | 25.4 | −10.9 |
| Green | Mike Cole | 91 | 14.7 | +14.7 |
| Majority | | 213 | 34.5 | |
| Turnout | | 618 | 19.0 | |
| Conservative gain from Labour | | Swing | | |
