= 1995 Maldon District Council election =

1995 English local election

- 4 May 1995

All 30 seats to Maldon District Council 16 seats needed for a majority

	First party	Second party	Third party
Party	Conservative	Independent	Labour
Seats won	12	10	7
Seat change	▼1	▲1	▲6
Popular vote	7,733	6,102	6,657
Percentage	33.7%	26.6%	29.1%
Swing	▼4.5%	▼1.5%	▲18.6%
	Fourth party	Fifth party
Party	Liberal Democrats	Ind. Conservative
Seats won	1	0
Seat change	▼5	▼1
Popular vote	1,240	did not stand
Percentage	5.4%	did not stand
Swing	▼14.3%	▼3.5%
- Winner of each seat at the 1995 Maldon District Council election.
Control before election
No overall control
Control after election
No overall control

The 1995 Maldon District Council election took place on 4 May 1995 to elect members of Maldon District Council in Essex, England. This was on the same day as other local elections.

== Summary ==
=== Election result ===
1995 Maldon District Council election
Party	Candidates	Seats	Gains	Losses	Net gain/loss	Seats %	Votes %	Votes	+/−
Conservative	22	12	4	5	▼1	40.0	33.7	7,733	–4.5
Independent	19	10	4	3	▲1	33.3	26.6	6,102	–1.5
Labour	17	7	6	0	▲6	23.3	29.1	6,657	+18.6
Liberal Democrats	4	1	0	5	▼5	3.3	5.4	1,240	–14.3
Green	8	0	0	0	Steady	0.0	5.2	1,182	N/A
Ind. Conservative	0	0	0	1	▼1	0.0	N/A	N/A	–3.5

== Ward results ==
Incumbent councillors standing for re-election are marked with an asterisk (*). Changes in seats do not take into account by-elections or defections.

=== Althorne ===
Althorne
Party	Candidate	Votes	%	±%
Conservative	R. Boyce*	375	55.9	
Labour	W. Dobson	296	44.1	
Majority		79	11.8	
Turnout		671	40.0	
Registered electors		1,689		
Conservative hold		Swing		

=== Burnham-on-Crouch North ===
Burnham-on-Crouch North
Party	Candidate	Votes	%	±%
Independent	M. Wood*	372	47.3	
Conservative	R. Buck*	265	33.7	
Independent	R. Crouch	149	19.0	
Majority		107	13.6	
Turnout		786	39.7	
Registered electors		2,047		
Independent hold		Swing		

=== Burnham-on-Crouch South ===
Burnham-on-Crouch South (3 seats)
Party	Candidate	Votes	%	±%
Independent	T. Martin*	682	52.7	
Conservative	J. Smith*	599	46.3	
Labour	T. Quinlan	583	45.0	
Conservative	J. Vallance	518	39.9	
Green	D. Mason	346	26.7	
Turnout		~1,295	37.2	
Registered electors		3,481		
Independent hold				
Conservative hold				
Labour gain from Conservative				

=== Cold Norton ===
Cold Norton
Party	Candidate	Votes	%	±%
Conservative	J. Archer	293	53.3	
Labour	A. Josselyn	257	46.7	
Majority		36	6.6	
Turnout		550	37.4	
Registered electors		1,483		
Conservative gain from Liberal Democrats		Swing		

=== Goldhanger ===
Goldhanger
Party	Candidate	Votes	%	±%
Conservative	R. Long*	254	51.8	
Green	J. King	236	48.2	
Majority		18	3.6	
Turnout		490	41.7	
Registered electors		1,220		
Conservative hold		Swing		

=== Great Totham ===
Great Totham (2 seats)
Party	Candidate	Votes	%	±%
Conservative	F. Delderfield*	709	58.7	
Conservative	R. Bass*	698	57.8	
Labour	K. Mehrtens	452	37.4	
Green	R. King	261	21.6	
Turnout		~1,207	50.9	
Registered electors		2,372		
Conservative hold				
Conservative hold				

=== Heybridge East ===
Heybridge East
Party	Candidate	Votes	%	±%
Labour	I. Mehrtens	306	34.1	
Liberal Democrats	H. Cocking*	304	33.9	
Conservative	A. Cheshire	259	28.8	
Green	A. Naidu	29	3.2	
Majority		2	0.2	
Turnout		898	32.4	
Registered electors		2,774		
Labour gain from Liberal Democrats		Swing		

=== Heybridge West ===
Heybridge West (2 seats)
Party	Candidate	Votes	%	±%
Liberal Democrats	P. Mead*	550	72.1	
Independent	B. Harker*	312	40.8	
Labour	R. Fifield	275	36.1	
Green	M. Cole	114	14.9	
Turnout		~764	38.9	
Registered electors		1,963		
Liberal Democrats hold				
Independent gain from Liberal Democrats				

=== Maldon East ===
Maldon East (2 seats)
Party	Candidate	Votes	%	±%
Labour	E. Bannister*	478	58.2	
Independent	B. Mead*	348	42.4	
Labour	P. Rew	336	40.9	
Independent	D. Whitehead	240	29.2	
Liberal Democrats	S. Partridge	74	9.0	
Green	J. Harpur	46	5.6	
Turnout		~821	40.3	
Registered electors		2,036		
Labour hold				
Independent gain from Liberal Democrats				

=== Maldon North West ===
Maldon North West (3 seats)
Party	Candidate	Votes	%	±%
Independent	R. Pipe*	653	47.6	
Labour	A. Lamb	638	46.5	
Labour	E. Vale	596	43.5	
Labour	K. Nunn	531	38.7	
Conservative	R. Daws*	520	37.9	
Conservative	A. Cain	396	28.9	
Independent	R. Hornett	193	14.1	
Turnout		~1,371	43.9	
Registered electors		3,123		
Independent gain from Ind. Conservative				
Labour gain from Conservative				
Labour gain from Liberal Democrats				

=== Maldon South ===
Maldon South (2 seats)
Party	Candidate	Votes	%	±%
Labour	P. Roberts	598	44.6	
Labour	J. Titmarsh	497	37.0	
Conservative	T. Kelly*	489	36.4	
Conservative	M. Bevis	463	34.5	
Liberal Democrats	J. Woodham	312	23.3	
Green	J. Carden	128	9.5	
Turnout		~1,342	34.0	
Registered electors		3,947		
Labour gain from Conservative				
Labour gain from Conservative				

=== Purleigh ===
Purleigh
Party	Candidate	Votes	%	±%
Independent	L. Cooper*	Unopposed		
Registered electors		1,214		
Independent hold				

=== Southminster ===
Southminster (2 seats)
Party	Candidate	Votes	%	±%
Independent	B. Beale*	654	78.8	
Independent	B. Cottam	361	43.5	
Conservative	P. Ryall*	228	27.5	
Turnout		~830	34.0	
Registered electors		2,441		
Independent hold				
Independent gain from Conservative				

=== St. Lawrence ===
St. Lawrence
Party	Candidate	Votes	%	±%
Conservative	H. Brock	231	61.3	
Independent	G. Duce	146	38.7	
Majority		85	22.6	
Turnout		377	34.6	
Registered electors		1,124		
Conservative gain from Independent		Swing		

=== The Maylands ===
The Maylands
Party	Candidate	Votes	%	±%
Conservative	P. Channer	300	31.5	
Labour	T. Layton	251	26.3	
Independent	D. Abernethy	238	25.0	
Independent	M. Holden	164	17.2	
Majority		49	5.2	
Turnout		953	40.0	
Registered electors		2,405		
Conservative hold		Swing		

=== Tillingham & Bradwell ===
Tillingham & Bradwell
Party	Candidate	Votes	%	±%
Conservative	R. Dewick*	288	54.9	
Independent	N. Hunt	237	45.1	
Majority		51	9.8	
Turnout		525	39.4	
Registered electors		1,347		
Conservative hold		Swing		

=== Tollesbury ===
Tollesbury (2 seats)
Party	Candidate	Votes	%	±%
Independent	B. McGhee*	468	46.4	
Independent	R. Laurie*	455	45.2	
Conservative	N. Butt	311	30.8	
Labour	S. Slodzik	230	22.8	
Labour	T. Wright	226	22.4	
Conservative	G. Munson	220	21.8	
Turnout		~1,009	51.7	
Registered electors		1,952		
Independent hold				
Independent hold				

=== Tolleshunt D'Arcy ===
Tolleshunt D'Arcy
Party	Candidate	Votes	%	±%
Conservative	M. Peel*	Unopposed		
Registered electors		1,511		
Conservative hold				

=== Wickham Bishops ===
Wickham Bishops
Party	Candidate	Votes	%	±%
Conservative	D. Howse	317	36.2	
Independent	T. Allard*	298	34.0	
Independent	D. Parsons	132	15.1	
Labour	G. Baker	107	12.2	
Green	R. Button	22	2.5	
Majority		19	2.2	
Turnout		876	53.3	
Registered electors		1,647		
Conservative gain from Independent		Swing		

=== Woodham ===
Woodham
Party	Candidate	Votes	%	±%
Conservative	S. Young	Unopposed		
Registered electors		1,228		
Conservative gain from Independent				
