= 2015 Maldon District Council election =

2015 English local election

- 7 May 2015

All 31 seats to Maldon District Council 16 seats needed for a majority

| | First party | Second party | Third party |
|---|---|---|---|
| Party | Conservative | Independent | UKIP |
| Seats won | 28 | 2 | 1 |
| Seat change | Steady | ▼1 | ▲1 |
| Popular vote | 26,993 | 7,055 | 3,477 |
| Percentage | 58.3% | 15.3% | 7.5% |
| Swing | ▼8.1% | ▲0.9% | ▲6.7% |
Control before election
Conservative
Control after election
Conservative

The 2015 Maldon District Council election took place on 7 May 2015 to elect members of Maldon District Council in Essex, England. This was on the same day as the 2015 general election and other local elections.

== Summary ==
=== Election result ===
The governing group of Conservative councillors retained the same overall level of representation across the district, with the exception of two seats held by councillors from other political parties, as had been the case prior to the election. In the two-member wards of Althorne and Southminster, one non-Conservative councillor was returned in each: Southminster remained represented by an independent councillor, while Althorne saw a gain for UKIP from the Conservatives. In both wards, these councillors will jointly represent their areas alongside a Conservative member. The election concluded with a Conservative gain from an independent in Burnham-on-Crouch North, resulting in 24 of the district’s 26 seats being held by the governing party.

2015 Maldon District Council election
| Party | Candidates | Seats | Gains | Losses | Net gain/loss | Seats % | Votes % | Votes | +/− |
|---|---|---|---|---|---|---|---|---|---|
| Conservative | 31 | 28 | 1 | 1 | Steady | 90.3 | 58.3 | 26,993 | –8.1 |
| Independent | 10 | 2 | 0 | 1 | ▼1 | 6.5 | 15.3 | 7,055 | +0.9 |
| UKIP | 6 | 1 | 1 | 0 | ▲1 | 3.2 | 7.5 | 3,477 | +6.7 |
| Labour | 11 | 0 | 0 | 0 | Steady | 0.0 | 9.5 | 4,393 | –1.0 |
| Green | 9 | 0 | 0 | 0 | Steady | 0.0 | 7.3 | 3,370 | +2.6 |
| BNP | 2 | 0 | 0 | 0 | Steady | 0.0 | 1.4 | 642 | –0.8 |
| Liberal Democrats | 1 | 0 | 0 | 0 | Steady | 0.0 | 0.7 | 331 | –0.3 |

The BNP candidates stood under the description "Fighting unsustainable housing because we care", with no references to their party on the ballot paper. However, they were actively promoted as candidates by the BNP.

== Ward results ==
Incumbent councillors standing for re-election are marked with an asterisk (*). Changes in seats do not take into account by-elections or defections.

=== Althorne ===
Althorne (2 seats)
| Party | Candidate | Votes | % | ±% |
|---|---|---|---|---|
| Conservative | Bob Boyce* | 1,123 | 50.6 | |
| UKIP | Beverley Acevedo | 856 | 38.6 | |
| Conservative | Tony Cussen* | 754 | 34.0 | |
| Independent | Linda Haywood | 677 | 30.5 | |
| Turnout | | 2,220 | 69.2 | |
| Registered electors | | 3,209 | | |
| Conservative hold | | | | |
| UKIP gain from Conservative | | | | |

=== Burnham-on-Crouch North ===
Burnham-on-Crouch North (2 seats)
| Party | Candidate | Votes | % | ±% |
|---|---|---|---|---|
| Conservative | Neil Pudney* | 918 | 45.0 | |
| Conservative | Helen Elliott | 750 | 36.8 | |
| Independent | Wendy Stamp | 564 | 27.6 | |
| Labour | Una Norman | 491 | 24.1 | |
| Independent | Michael Wood* | 415 | 20.3 | |
| Green | Fiona Hearn | 213 | 10.4 | |
| Turnout | | 2,040 | 68.5 | |
| Registered electors | | 2,978 | | |
| Conservative hold | | | | |
| Conservative gain from Independent | | | | |

=== Burnham-on-Crouch South ===
Burnham-on-Crouch South (2 seats)
| Party | Candidate | Votes | % | ±% |
|---|---|---|---|---|
| Conservative | Ron Pratt* | 1,090 | 51.8 | |
| Conservative | Peter Elliott* | 1,007 | 47.9 | |
| Green | Janet Dine | 569 | 27.0 | |
| Labour | Leslie McDonald | 512 | 24.3 | |
| Turnout | | 2,104 | 66.3 | |
| Registered electors | | 3,173 | | |
| Conservative hold | | | | |
| Conservative hold | | | | |

=== Great Totham ===
Great Totham (2 seats)
| Party | Candidate | Votes | % | ±% |
|---|---|---|---|---|
| Conservative | John Keyes | 1,226 | 58.4 | |
| Conservative | David Sismey* | 932 | 44.4 | |
| UKIP | Andrew North | 553 | 26.3 | |
| UKIP | Steve Cobb | 431 | 20.5 | |
| Green | Robert Graves | 322 | 15.3 | |
| Turnout | | 2,101 | 72.2 | |
| Registered electors | | 2,911 | | |
| Conservative hold | | | | |
| Conservative hold | | | | |

=== Heybridge East ===
Heybridge East (2 seats)
| Party | Candidate | Votes | % | ±% |
|---|---|---|---|---|
| Conservative | Anne Beale* | 1,116 | 49.3 | |
| Conservative | Bryan Harker* | 938 | 41.4 | |
| UKIP | Alan Outlaw | 663 | 29.3 | |
| Labour | Richard Wathen | 397 | 17.5 | |
| BNP | Mark Burmby | 235 | 10.4 | |
| Independent | Stephen Jennings | 235 | 10.4 | |
| Turnout | | 2,263 | 69.3 | |
| Registered electors | | 3,266 | | |
| Conservative hold | | | | |
| Conservative hold | | | | |

=== Heybridge West ===
Heybridge West (2 seats)
| Party | Candidate | Votes | % | ±% |
|---|---|---|---|---|
| Conservative | Ian Dobson | 754 | 39.6 | |
| Conservative | Miriam Lewis* | 734 | 38.6 | |
| Labour | Rosalind Larner | 496 | 26.1 | |
| Independent | Alan Cheshire* | 453 | 23.8 | |
| BNP | Richard Perry | 407 | 21.4 | |
| Turnout | | 1,904 | 61.3 | |
| Registered electors | | 3,105 | | |
| Conservative hold | | | | |
| Conservative hold | | | | |

=== Maldon East ===
Maldon East
| Party | Candidate | Votes | % | ±% |
|---|---|---|---|---|
| Conservative | Stephen Savage* | 534 | 59.0 | |
| Labour | Ian Kidman | 371 | 41.0 | |
| Majority | | 163 | 18.0 | |
| Turnout | | 905 | 58.1 | |
| Registered electors | | 1,592 | | |
| Conservative hold | | Swing | | |

=== Maldon North ===
Maldon North (2 seats)
| Party | Candidate | Votes | % | ±% |
|---|---|---|---|---|
| Conservative | Tony Shrimpton* | 1,058 | 49.0 | |
| Conservative | Michael Pearlman* | 976 | 45.2 | |
| Labour | John Sweeney | 504 | 23.3 | |
| Green | Robert King | 463 | 21.4 | |
| Labour | John Walker | 407 | 18.8 | |
| Turnout | | 2,160 | 65.2 | |
| Registered electors | | 3,312 | | |
| Conservative hold | | | | |
| Conservative hold | | | | |

=== Maldon South ===
Maldon South (2 seats)
| Party | Candidate | Votes | % | ±% |
|---|---|---|---|---|
| Conservative | Andrew Cain* | 1,017 | 48.8 | |
| Conservative | Brenda Harker* | 1,013 | 48.6 | |
| Independent | Martyn Dickinson | 887 | 42.6 | |
| Turnout | | 2,083 | 68.2 | |
| Registered electors | | 3,054 | | |
| Conservative hold | | | | |
| Conservative hold | | | | |

=== Maldon West ===
Maldon West (2 seats)
| Party | Candidate | Votes | % | ±% |
|---|---|---|---|---|
| Independent | Mark Heard* | 1,303 | 58.5 | |
| Conservative | Charles Mackenzie | 767 | 34.4 | |
| Conservative | Richie Miller | 692 | 31.1 | |
| Green | Janet Carden | 498 | 22.4 | |
| Turnout | | 2,227 | 72.7 | |
| Registered electors | | 3,063 | | |
| Independent hold | | | | |
| Conservative hold | | | | |

=== Mayland ===
Mayland (2 seats)
| Party | Candidate | Votes | % | ±% |
|---|---|---|---|---|
| Conservative | Penny Channer* | 1,365 | 60.2 | |
| Conservative | Michael Helm | 1,080 | 47.6 | |
| Independent | Jason Stammers | 896 | 39.5 | |
| Turnout | | 2,267 | 68.1 | |
| Registered electors | | 3,329 | | |
| Conservative hold | | | | |
| Conservative hold | | | | |

=== Purleigh ===
Purleigh (2 seats)
| Party | Candidate | Votes | % | ±% |
|---|---|---|---|---|
| Conservative | John Archer* | Unopposed | | |
| Conservative | Sue White* | Unopposed | | |
| Registered electors | | N/A | | |
| Conservative hold | | | | |
| Conservative hold | | | | |

=== Southminster ===
Southminster (2 seats)
| Party | Candidate | Votes | % | ±% |
|---|---|---|---|---|
| Conservative | Adrian Fluker* | 956 | 50.5 | |
| Independent | Brian Beale* | 896 | 47.4 | |
| Conservative | Babs Owers | 450 | 23.8 | |
| Green | Avril Howe | 306 | 16.2 | |
| Labour | Maddy Diamond | 279 | 14.7 | |
| Turnout | | 1,892 | 60.7 | |
| Registered electors | | 3,116 | | |
| Conservative hold | | | | |
| Independent hold | | | | |

=== Tillingham ===
Tillingham
| Party | Candidate | Votes | % | ±% |
|---|---|---|---|---|
| Conservative | Richard Dewick* | 683 | 57.4 | |
| UKIP | Tim Drain | 343 | 28.8 | |
| Labour | Norman Hunt | 163 | 13.7 | |
| Majority | | 340 | 28.6 | |
| Turnout | | 1,189 | 71.7 | |
| Registered electors | | 1,673 | | |
| Conservative hold | | Swing | | |

=== Tollesbury ===
Tollesbury
| Party | Candidate | Votes | % | ±% |
|---|---|---|---|---|
| Conservative | Andrew St Joseph | 523 | 46.8 | |
| Labour | Stevan Slodzik | 491 | 43.9 | |
| Green | Stephen Watson | 104 | 9.3 | |
| Majority | | 32 | 2.9 | |
| Turnout | | 1,118 | 70.0 | |
| Registered electors | | 1,598 | | |
| Conservative hold | | Swing | | |

=== Tolleshunt D'Arcy ===
Tolleshunt D'Arcy (2 seats)
| Party | Candidate | Votes | % | ±% |
|---|---|---|---|---|
| Conservative | Elaine Bamford | 925 | 45.4 | |
| Conservative | Maddie Thompson* | 876 | 43.0 | |
| Independent | Robert Long* | 729 | 35.8 | |
| UKIP | Gerald Munson | 631 | 31.0 | |
| Liberal Democrats | John Fairhurst | 331 | 16.2 | |
| Green | Jonathan King | 300 | 14.7 | |
| Labour | Barry Jones | 282 | 13.8 | |
| Turnout | | 2,037 | 61.7 | |
| Registered electors | | 3,299 | | |
| Conservative hold | | | | |
| Conservative hold | | | | |

=== Wickham Bishops & Woodham ===
Wickham Bishops & Woodham (2 seats)
| Party | Candidate | Votes | % | ±% |
|---|---|---|---|---|
| Conservative | Henry Bass* | 1,461 | 71.1 | |
| Conservative | Mark Durham* | 1,275 | 62.0 | |
| Green | John le Seve | 595 | 28.9 | |
| Turnout | | 2,056 | 71.4 | |
| Registered electors | | 2,881 | | |
| Conservative hold | | | | |
| Conservative hold | | | | |

== By-elections ==
Maldon West By-Election 8 December 2016
| Party | Candidate | Votes | % | ±% |
|---|---|---|---|---|
| Independent | Flo Saughnessy | 279 | 38.1 | +38.1 |
| Conservative | Martin Harvey | 172 | 23.5 | −21.2 |
| UKIP | Andrew Francis | 114 | 15.6 | +15.6 |
| Green | Janet Carden | 69 | 9.4 | −5.9 |
| BNP | Richard Perry* | 51 | 7.0 | +7.0 |
| Labour | John Sweeney | 47 | 6.4 | +6.4 |
| Majority | | 107 | 14.6 | |
| Turnout | | 732 | | |
| Independent gain from Conservative | | Swing | | |
