= 1983 Maldon District Council election =

- 5 May 1983

All 30 seats to Maldon District Council 16 seats needed for a majority

	First party	Second party	Third party
Party	Conservative	Alliance	Independent
Seats won	15	9	3
Seat change	▼3	▲6	▼3
Popular vote	10,369	10,106	1,710
Percentage	41.3%	40.2%	6.8%
Swing	▼8.2%	▲27.9%	▼7.9%
	Fourth party	Fifth party
Party	Ind. Conservative	Labour
Seats won	2	1
Seat change	▲1	▼1
Popular vote	1,123	1,806
Percentage	4.5%	7.2%
Swing	▼2.7%	▼9.2%
- Winner of each seat at the 1983 Maldon District Council election.
Control before election
Conservative
Control after election
No overall control

The 1983 Maldon District Council election took place on 5 May 1983 to elect members of Maldon District Council in Essex, England. This was on the same day as other local elections.

== Summary ==
=== Election result ===
1983 Maldon District Council election
Party	Candidates	Seats	Gains	Losses	Net gain/loss	Seats %	Votes %	Votes	+/−
Conservative	25	15	1	4	▼3	50.0	41.3	10,369	–8.2
Alliance	21	9	6	0	▲6	30.0	40.2	10,106	+27.9
Independent	8	3	0	3	▼3	10.0	6.8	1,710	–7.9
Ind. Conservative	2	2	2	1	▲1	6.7	4.5	1,123	–2.7
Labour	7	1	0	1	▼1	3.3	7.2	1,806	–9.2

== Ward results ==
Incumbent councillors standing for re-election are marked with an asterisk (*). Changes in seats do not take into account by-elections or defections.

=== Althorne ===
Althorne
Party	Candidate	Votes	%	±%
Conservative	R. Boyce	Unopposed		
Registered electors		1,465		
Conservative hold				

=== Burnham-on-Crouch North ===
Burnham-on-Crouch North
Party	Candidate	Votes	%	±%
Conservative	J. Gill	453	58.2	
Alliance	E. Sage	325	41.8	
Majority		128	16.5	
Turnout		778	38.7	
Registered electors		2,010		
Conservative hold		Swing		

=== Burnham On Crouch South ===
Burnham On Crouch South (3 seats)
Party	Candidate	Votes	%	±%
Alliance	G. Blaney	759	52.4	
Conservative	M. Freeman*	687	47.4	
Alliance	J. Gillbee	669	46.2	
Alliance	M. Blaney	572	39.5	
Conservative	G. Stannard	489	33.8	
Turnout		~1,448	47.6	
Registered electors		3,041		
Alliance gain from Independent				
Conservative hold				
Alliance gain from Conservative				

=== Cold Norton ===
Cold Norton
Party	Candidate	Votes	%	±%
Conservative	G. Broyd	318	43.1	
Independent	G. Hooper	276	37.4	
Independent	A. Paul	144	19.5	
Majority		42	5.7	
Turnout		738	58.2	
Registered electors		1,268		
Conservative hold		Swing		

=== Goldhanger ===
Goldhanger
Party	Candidate	Votes	%	±%
Conservative	H. Frost*	389	61.1	
Alliance	B. Thompson	248	38.9	
Majority		141	22.2	
Turnout		637	54.4	
Registered electors		1,171		
Conservative hold		Swing		

=== Great Totham ===
Great Totham (2 seats)
Party	Candidate	Votes	%	±%
Conservative	R. Bass*	830	66.7	
Conservative	F. Dalderfield	768	61.7	
Alliance	M. Brand	415	33.4	
Alliance	D. Lawton	313	25.2	
Turnout		~1,244	54.9	
Registered electors		2,266		
Conservative hold				
Conservative hold				

=== Heybridge East ===
Heybridge East
Party	Candidate	Votes	%	±%
Alliance	L. Bermingham*	613	62.9	
Conservative	M. Hall	361	37.1	
Majority		252	25.8	
Turnout		974	51.8	
Registered electors		1,882		
Alliance hold		Swing		

=== Heybridge West ===
Heybridge West (2 seats)
Party	Candidate	Votes	%	±%
Alliance	J. Goldring	723	81.3	
Alliance	A. Good*	716	80.5	
Conservative	O. Bryant	167	18.8	
Conservative	D. Norris	155	17.4	
Turnout		~889	45.4	
Registered electors		1,959		
Alliance hold				
Alliance hold				

=== Maldon East ===
Maldon East (2 seats)
Party	Candidate	Votes	%	±%
Labour	E. Bannister*	382	31.5	
Alliance	D. Coulthread	369	30.4	
Alliance	B. Dearlove	347	28.6	
Conservative	A. Payne	280	23.1	
Labour	J. Lewis	279	23.0	
Conservative	T. Kelly	277	22.9	
Independent	B. Mead	180	14.9	
Turnout		~1,212	57.9	
Registered electors		2,093		
Labour hold				
Alliance gain from Labour				

=== Maldon North West ===
Maldon North West (3 seats)
Party	Candidate	Votes	%	±%
Ind. Conservative	R. Pipe*	1,123	44.4	
Conservative	R. Daws*	613	24.3	
Conservative	K. Munnion*	555	22.0	
Alliance	P. Wallis	538	21.3	
Alliance	M. Eborall	453	17.9	
Alliance	P. Hawkins	407	16.1	
Labour	J. Lees	256	10.1	
Labour	A. Joyce	224	8.9	
Turnout		~2,528	76.9	
Registered electors		3,288		
Ind. Conservative gain from Conservative				
Conservative hold				
Conservative hold				

=== Maldon South ===
Maldon South (2 seats)
Party	Candidate	Votes	%	±%
Alliance	C. Norrington	676	47.9	
Alliance	R. Hornett	586	41.5	
Conservative	D. Sewell*	482	34.2	
Conservative	M. Beavis	436	30.9	
Labour	G. Hudson	252	17.9	
Labour	C. Lawder	233	16.5	
Turnout		~1,411	52.4	
Registered electors		2,693		
Alliance gain from Conservative				
Alliance gain from Conservative				

=== Purleigh ===
Purleigh
Party	Candidate	Votes	%	±%
Independent	G. Barber*	Unopposed		
Registered electors		1,207		
Independent hold				

=== Southminster ===
Southminster (2 seats)
Party	Candidate	Votes	%	±%
Conservative	D. Fisher*	478	48.8	
Conservative	H. Cottam*	380	38.8	
Alliance	J. Kelly	321	32.8	
Alliance	M. Black	293	29.9	
Labour	N. Hunt	180	18.4	
Turnout		~980	42.7	
Registered electors		2,295		
Conservative gain from Ind. Conservative				
Conservative hold				

=== St. Lawrence ===
St. Lawrence
Party	Candidate	Votes	%	±%
Ind. Conservative	R. Cowell*	Unopposed		
Registered electors		916		
Ind. Conservative gain from Independent				

=== The Maylands ===
The Maylands
Party	Candidate	Votes	%	±%
Conservative	F. Ashford	Unopposed		
Registered electors		1,816		
Conservative hold				

=== Tillingham & Bradwell ===
Tillingham & Bradwell
Party	Candidate	Votes	%	±%
Alliance	J. Forrester	248	42.3	
Independent	E. Chandler	187	31.9	
Conservative	E. Gregory	151	25.8	
Majority		61	10.4	
Turnout		586	44.8	
Registered electors		1,307		
Alliance gain from Independent		Swing		

=== Tollesbury ===
Tollesbury (2 seats)
Party	Candidate	Votes	%	±%
Conservative	N. Butt	530	33.7	
Independent	D. Shrimpton*	526	33.5	
Alliance	G. Johnson	515	32.8	
Conservative	D. Scott	490	31.2	
Turnout		~1,571	82.5	
Registered electors		1,904		
Conservative hold				
Independent hold				

=== Tolleshunt D'Arcy ===
Tolleshunt D'Arcy
Party	Candidate	Votes	%	±%
Conservative	J. Peel*	431	52.1	
Independent	M. Fairweather	397	48.0	
Majority		34	4.1	
Turnout		828	59.4	
Registered electors		1,395		
Conservative hold		Swing		

=== Wickham Bishops ===
Wickham Bishops
Party	Candidate	Votes	%	±%
Conservative	H. Bass*	Unopposed		
Registered electors		1,532		
Conservative hold				

=== Woodham ===
Woodham
Party	Candidate	Votes	%	±%
Independent	P. Herrmann*	Unopposed		
Registered electors		1,188		
Independent hold				
