= 1987 Maldon District Council election =

1987 English local government election

- 7 May 1987

All 30 seats to Maldon District Council 16 seats needed for a majority

	First party	Second party	Third party
Party	Conservative	Alliance	Independent
Seats won	14	11	2
Seat change	▼1	▲2	▼1
Popular vote	12,405	11,986	1,451
Percentage	42.9%	41.5%	5.0%
Swing	▲3.2%	▲0.2%	▼2.0%
	Fourth party	Fifth party
Party	Ind. Conservative	Labour
Seats won	2	1
Seat change	Steady	Steady
Popular vote	944	2,101
Percentage	3.3%	7.3%
Swing	▼1.3%	▼0.1%
- Winner of each seat at the 1987 Maldon District Council election.
Control before election
No overall control
Control after election
No overall control

The 1987 Maldon District Council election took place on 7 May 1987 to elect members of Maldon District Council in Essex, England. This was on the same day as other local elections.

== Summary ==
=== Election result ===
1987 Maldon District Council election
Party	Candidates	Seats	Gains	Losses	Net gain/loss	Seats %	Votes %	Votes	+/−
Conservative	22	14	1	2	▼1	46.7	42.9	12,405	+1.6
Alliance	28	11	2	0	▲2	36.7	41.5	11,986	+1.3
Independent	7	2	1	2	▼1	6.7	5.0	1,451	–1.8
Ind. Conservative	2	2	0	0	Steady	6.7	3.3	944	–1.2
Labour	8	1	0	0	Steady	3.3	7.3	2,101	+0.1

== Ward results ==
Incumbent councillors standing for re-election are marked with an asterisk (*). Changes in seats do not take into account by-elections or defections.

=== Althorne ===
Althorne
Party	Candidate	Votes	%	±%
Conservative	R. Boyce*	581	71.8	
Alliance	C. Wilkinson	228	28.2	
Majority		353	43.6	
Turnout		809	50.3	
Registered electors		1,609		
Conservative hold		Swing		

=== Burnham-on-Crouch North ===
Burnham-on-Crouch North
Party	Candidate	Votes	%	±%
Conservative	J. Vallance	521	58.6	
Alliance	E. Sage	368	41.4	
Majority		153	17.2	
Turnout		889	43.9	
Registered electors		2,024		
Conservative hold		Swing		

=== Burnham-on-Crouch South ===
Burnham-on-Crouch South (3 seats)
Party	Candidate	Votes	%	±%
Conservative	J. Smith	768	42.3	
Alliance	G. Blaney*	712	39.2	
Alliance	J. Gillbee*	604	33.2	
Alliance	D. Wallis	484	26.6	
Labour	M. Pope	337	18.5	
Turnout		~1,817	55.0	
Registered electors		3,304		
Conservative hold				
Alliance hold				
Alliance hold				

=== Cold Norton ===
Cold Norton
Party	Candidate	Votes	%	±%
Conservative	G. Broyd*	364	41.9	
Independent	G. Hooper	289	33.3	
Alliance	M. Abbott	215	24.8	
Majority		75	8.6	
Turnout		868	65.2	
Registered electors		1,331		
Conservative hold		Swing		

=== Goldhanger ===
Goldhanger
Party	Candidate	Votes	%	±%
Conservative	H. Frost*	345	51.4	
Alliance	I. Thorn	326	48.6	
Majority		19	2.8	
Turnout		671	55.7	
Registered electors		1,204		
Conservative hold		Swing		

=== Great Totham ===
Great Totham (2 seats)
Party	Candidate	Votes	%	±%
Conservative	R. Bass*	873	64.4	
Conservative	F. Delderfield*	872	64.3	
Alliance	P. Smith	483	35.6	
Alliance	D. Lawton	439	32.4	
Turnout		~1,357	58.1	
Registered electors		2,335		
Conservative hold				
Conservative hold				

=== Heybridge East ===
Heybridge East
Party	Candidate	Votes	%	±%
Alliance	H. Cocking	613	51.9	
Conservative	M. Hall	568	48.1	
Majority		45	3.8	
Turnout		1,181	49.9	
Registered electors		2,367		
Alliance hold		Swing		

=== Heybridge West ===
Heybridge West (2 seats)
Party	Candidate	Votes	%	±%
Alliance	A. Goldring*	621	47.3	
Alliance	P. Mead	616	47.0	
Conservative	J. Lilley	427	32.5	
Labour	S. Slodzik	264	20.1	
Turnout		~1,312	66.9	
Registered electors		1,961		
Alliance hold				
Alliance hold				

=== Maldon East ===
Maldon East (2 seats)
Party	Candidate	Votes	%	±%
Alliance	S. Arnold	393	33.1	
Labour	F. Bannister*	370	31.1	
Conservative	B. Mead	363	30.5	
Alliance	F. Clements	296	24.9	
Labour	W. Dobson	273	23.0	
Conservative	N. Prior	260	21.9	
Independent	L. Banyard	63	5.3	
Turnout		~1,189	57.5	
Registered electors		2,068		
Alliance hold				
Labour hold				

=== Maldon North West ===
Maldon North West (3 seats)
Party	Candidate	Votes	%	±%
Ind. Conservative	R. Pipe*	944	38.0	
Conservative	R. Daws*	753	30.3	
Conservative	K. Munnion*	646	26.0	
Alliance	R. Henfrey	581	23.4	
Alliance	R. Guise	578	23.3	
Alliance	L. Ovenden	530	21.3	
Labour	H. Josselyn	205	8.3	
Labour	J. Lees	201	8.1	
Turnout		~2,484	77.2	
Registered electors		3,218		
Ind. Conservative hold				
Conservative hold				
Conservative hold				

=== Maldon South ===
Maldon South (2 seats)
Party	Candidate	Votes	%	±%
Alliance	C. Norrington*	786	47.4	
Alliance	R. Hornett*	647	39.0	
Conservative	I. Kelly	610	36.8	
Conservative	M. Bevis	590	35.6	
Labour	P. Roberts	261	15.8	
Labour	A. Dunion	190	11.5	
Turnout		~1,657	56.3	
Registered electors		2,944		
Alliance hold				
Alliance hold				

=== Purleigh ===
Purleigh
Party	Candidate	Votes	%	±%
Alliance	D. Lawton	Unopposed		
Registered electors		1,193		
Alliance gain from Independent				

=== Southminster ===
Southminster (2 seats)
Party	Candidate	Votes	%	±%
Conservative	D. Fisher*	457	30.0	
Independent	B. Beale	427	28.0	
Conservative	J. Cottam*	392	25.8	
Alliance	M. Black	353	23.2	
Alliance	S. Power	312	20.5	
Independent	V. Smith	177	11.6	
Turnout		~1,237	52.5	
Registered electors		2,356		
Conservative hold				
Independent gain from Conservative				

=== St. Lawrence ===
St. Lawrence
Party	Candidate	Votes	%	±%
Ind. Conservative	R. Cowell*	Unopposed		
Registered electors		1,003		
Ind. Conservative hold				

=== The Maylands ===
The Maylands
Party	Candidate	Votes	%	±%
Conservative	F. Ashford*	608	67.7	
Alliance	M. Stichbury	290	32.3	
Majority		318	35.4	
Turnout		898	43.2	
Registered electors		2,077		
Conservative hold		Swing		

=== Tillingham & Bradwell ===
Tillingham & Bradwell
Party	Candidate	Votes	%	±%
Alliance	J. Forester*	Unopposed		
Registered electors		1,323		
Alliance hold				

=== Tollesbury ===
Tollesbury (2 seats)
Party	Candidate	Votes	%	±%
Conservative	N. Butt*	673	45.7	
Conservative	J. Juniper	635	43.1	
Independent	R. Laurie	308	20.9	
Alliance	M. Buckley	275	18.7	
Alliance	M. Buckley	261	17.7	
Independent	J. Heigham	187	12.7	
Turnout		~1,256	65.6	
Registered electors		1,915		
Conservative hold				
Conservative gain from Independent				

=== Tolleshunt D'Arcy ===
Tolleshunt D'Arcy
Party	Candidate	Votes	%	±%
Conservative	J. Peel*	533	57.3	
Alliance	A. Hatton	397	42.7	
Majority		136	14.6	
Turnout		930	65.1	
Registered electors		1,428		
Conservative hold		Swing		

=== Wickham Bishops ===
Wickham Bishops
Party	Candidate	Votes	%	±%
Alliance	T. Allard	578	50.5	
Conservative	H. Bass*	566	49.5	
Majority		12	1.0	
Turnout		1,144	72.9	
Registered electors		1,569		
Alliance gain from Conservative		Swing		

=== Woodham ===
Woodham
Party	Candidate	Votes	%	±%
Independent	P. Herrmann*	Unopposed		
Registered electors		1,211		
Independent hold				
