= 2011 Maldon District Council election =

2011 English local election

- 5 May 2011

All 31 seats to Maldon District Council 16 seats needed for a majority

	First party	Second party	Third party
Party	Conservative	Independent	Democratic Alliance
Seats won	28	3	0
Seat change	▲2	Steady	▼2
Popular vote	18,551	4,036	did not stand
Percentage	66.4%	14.4%	did not stand
Swing	▲6.4%	▲7.1%	▼16.7%
Control before election
Conservative
Control after election
Conservative

The 2011 Maldon District Council election took place on 5 May 2011 to elect members of Maldon District Council in Essex, England. This was on the same day as other local elections.

== Summary ==
=== Election result ===
2011 Maldon District Council election
Party	Candidates	Seats	Gains	Losses	Net gain/loss	Seats %	Votes %	Votes	+/−
Conservative	31	28	3	1	▲2	90.3	66.4	18,551	+6.4
Independent	8	3	1	1	Steady	9.7	14.4	4,036	+7.1
Labour	10	0	0	0	Steady	0.0	10.5	2,926	+1.0
Green	5	0	0	0	Steady	0.0	4.7	1,315	N/A
BNP	3	0	0	0	Steady	0.0	2.2	611	–2.8
Liberal Democrats	2	0	0	0	Steady	0.0	1.0	283	+0.4
UKIP	1	0	0	0	Steady	0.0	0.8	219	–0.1
Democratic Alliance	0	0	0	2	▼2	0.0	N/A	N/A	–16.7

== Ward results ==
Incumbent councillors standing for re-election are marked with an asterisk (*). Changes in seats do not take into account by-elections or defections.

=== Althorne ===
Althorne (2 seats)
Party	Candidate	Votes	%	±%
Conservative	Robert Boyce	963	73.0	
Conservative	Tony Cussen*	781	59.2	
BNP	Len Blain	213	16.1	
Turnout		~1,319	39.9	
Registered electors		3,305		
Conservative hold				
Conservative hold				

=== Burnham-on-Crouch North ===
Burnham-on-Crouch North (2 seats)
Party	Candidate	Votes	%	±%
Independent	Michael Wood*	756	58.9	
Conservative	Neil Pudney*	589	45.9	
Conservative	Matthew Pudney	494	38.5	
Turnout		~1,283	43.0	
Registered electors		2,983		
Independent hold				
Conservative hold				

=== Burnham-on-Crouch South ===
Burnham-on-Crouch South (2 seats)
Party	Candidate	Votes	%	±%
Conservative	Peter Elliott	730	53.6	
Conservative	Ron Pratt*	581	42.7	
Independent	Jack Sheppard	548	40.3	
Labour	Leslie McDonald	348	25.6	
Turnout		~1,361	43.1	
Registered electors		3,157		
Conservative hold				
Conservative hold				

=== Great Totham ===
Great Totham (2 seats)
Party	Candidate	Votes	%	±%
Conservative	Frank Delderfield*	1,068	71.1	
Conservative	David Sismey*	807	53.7	
Green	Robert Graves	339	22.6	
Labour	Keith Flynn	273	18.2	
Turnout		~1,503	51.6	
Registered electors		2,912		
Conservative hold				
Conservative hold				

=== Heybridge East ===
Heybridge East (2 seats)
Party	Candidate	Votes	%	±%
Conservative	Anne Beale*	903	71.2	
Conservative	Bryan Harker*	765	60.3	
BNP	Mark Burmby	214	16.9	
Turnout		~1,269	39.7	
Registered electors		3,197		
Conservative hold				
Conservative hold				

=== Heybridge West ===
Heybridge West (2 seats)
Party	Candidate	Votes	%	±%
Conservative	Miriam Lewis*	726	68.2	
Conservative	Alan Cheshire*	596	56.0	
BNP	Richard Perry	184	17.3	
Turnout		~1,065	34.8	
Registered electors		3,061		
Conservative hold				
Conservative hold				

=== Maldon East ===
Maldon East
Party	Candidate	Votes	%	±%
Conservative	Stephen Savage*	254	47.7	
Labour	John Sweeney	160	30.0	
Independent	Richard Hawkes	119	22.3	
Majority		94	17.7	
Turnout		533	33.8	
Registered electors		1,646		
Conservative hold		Swing		

=== Maldon North ===
Maldon North (2 seats)
Party	Candidate	Votes	%	±%
Conservative	Tony Shrimpton	720	48.2	
Conservative	Michael Pearlman	606	40.5	
Labour	Jon Howorth	516	34.5	
Independent	Brian Mead*	481	32.2	
Turnout		~1,495	46.0	
Registered electors		3,250		
Conservative gain from Democratic Alliance				
Conservative hold				

=== Maldon South ===
Maldon South (2 seats)
Party	Candidate	Votes	%	±%
Conservative	Andrew Cain*	743	56.5	
Conservative	Brenda Harker	721	54.8	
Labour	Michael Bentley	492	37.4	
Turnout		~1,315	43.8	
Registered electors		3,002		
Conservative hold				
Conservative hold				

=== Maldon West ===
Maldon West (2 seats)
Party	Candidate	Votes	%	±%
Independent	Mark Heard	573	39.7	
Conservative	David Williams*	565	39.2	
Conservative	Charles Mackenzie*	460	31.9	
Independent	Tom Kelly	397	27.5	
Green	Janet Carden	185	12.8	
Liberal Democrats	Kate Grundy*	154	10.7	
Liberal Democrats	Daniel Grundy	129	8.9	
Turnout		~1,443	47.5	
Registered electors		3,037		
Independent gain from Conservative				
Conservative hold				

=== Mayland ===
Mayland (2 seats)
Party	Candidate	Votes	%	±%
Conservative	David Horner*	Unopposed		
Conservative	Penny Channer*	Unopposed		
Registered electors		3,419		
Conservative hold				
Conservative hold				

=== Purleigh ===
Purleigh (2 seats)
Party	Candidate	Votes	%	±%
Conservative	John Archer*	Unopposed		
Conservative	Sue White	Unopposed		
Registered electors		2,720		
Conservative hold				
Conservative hold				

=== Southminster ===
Southminster (2 seats)
Party	Candidate	Votes	%	±%
Independent	Brian Beale*	733	64.5	
Conservative	Adrian Fluker	488	43.0	
Conservative	Helen Elliott	341	30.0	
Labour	Madeline Diamond	217	19.1	
Turnout		~1,136	36.1	
Registered electors		3,148		
Independent hold				
Conservative hold				

=== Tillingham ===
Tillingham
Party	Candidate	Votes	%	±%
Conservative	Richard Dewick*	513	59.0	
UKIP	Tim Drain	219	25.2	
Labour	Norman Hunt	137	15.8	
Majority		294	33.8	
Turnout		869	50.7	
Registered electors		1,753		
Conservative gain from Democratic Alliance		Swing		

=== Tollesbury ===
Tollesbury
Party	Candidate	Votes	%	±%
Conservative	Russell Porter	358	48.0	
Labour	Stevan Slodzik	268	35.9	
Green	Robert King	120	16.1	
Majority		90	12.1	
Turnout		746	47.6	
Registered electors		1,593		
Conservative gain from Independent		Swing		

=== Tolleshunt D'Arcy ===
Tolleshunt D'Arcy (2 seats)
Party	Candidate	Votes	%	±%
Conservative	Robert Long*	887	54.9	
Conservative	Ma5ie Thompson	699	43.3	
Independent	Gerald Munson	429	26.6	
Green	Jonathan King	296	18.3	
Labour	Robert Stannard	272	16.8	
Turnout		~1,615	49.6	
Registered electors		3,257		
Conservative hold				
Conservative hold				

=== Wickham Bishops & Woodham ===
Wickham Bishops & Woodham (2 seats)
Party	Candidate	Votes	%	±%
Conservative	Henry Bass	1,141	70.4	
Conservative	Mark Durham	1,052	64.9	
Green	Kevin Cornwell	375	23.1	
Labour	Ron McKay	243	15.0	
Turnout		~1,621	56.5	
Registered electors		2,869		
Conservative hold				
Conservative hold				

== By-elections ==
Tollesbury By-Election 5 July 2012
Party	Candidate	Votes	%	±%
Labour	Stevan Slodzik	271	44.9	+9.0
Conservative	Andrew St Joseph	257	42.6	−5.4
Independent	Gerald Munson	75	12.4	+12.4
Majority		14	2.3	
Turnout		603		
Labour gain from Conservative		Swing		
