= 2007 Maldon District Council election =

2007 English local election

- 3 May 2007

All 31 seats to Maldon District Council 16 seats needed for a majority

	First party	Second party
Party	Conservative	Independent
Seats won	26	3
Seat change	▲5	▼1
Popular vote	11,525	1,400
Percentage	60.0%	7.3%
Swing	▲6.8%	▼4.4%
	Third party	Fourth party
Party	Democratic Alliance	Labour
Seats won	2	0
Seat change	▼2	▼2
Popular vote	3,206	1,826
Percentage	16.7%	9.5%
Swing	▲1.0%	▼2.4%
Control before election
Conservative
Control after election
Conservative

The 2007 Maldon District Council election took place on 3 May 2007 to elect members of Maldon District Council in Essex, England. This was on the same day as other local elections.

== Summary ==
=== Election result ===
2007 Maldon District Council election
Party	Candidates	Seats	Gains	Losses	Net gain/loss	Seats %	Votes %	Votes	+/−
Conservative	31	26	5	0	▲5	83.9	60.0	11,525	+6.8
Independent	3	3	0	1	▼1	9.7	7.3	1,400	–4.4
Democratic Alliance	9	2	0	2	▼2	6.5	16.7	3,206	+1.0
Labour	9	0	0	2	▼2	0.0	9.5	1,826	–2.4
BNP	5	0	0	0	Steady	0.0	5.0	957	N/A
UKIP	1	0	0	0	Steady	0.0	0.9	177	N/A
Liberal Democrats	1	0	0	0	Steady	0.0	0.6	110	N/A

8 Conservatives were elected unopposed.

== Ward results ==
Incumbent councillors standing for re-election are marked with an asterisk (*). Changes in seats do not take into account by-elections or defections.

=== Althorne ===
Althorne (2 seats)
Party	Candidate	Votes	%	±%
Conservative	Bob Boyce*	610	54.8	
Conservative	Tony Cussen	457	41.1	
Democratic Alliance	Michael Helm	451	40.5	
BNP	Len Blain	221	19.9	
BNP	Dean Gosling	204	18.3	
Turnout		~1,113	35.2	
Registered electors		3,161		
Conservative hold				
Conservative gain from Democratic Alliance				

=== Burnham-on-Crouch North ===
Burnham-on-Crouch North (2 seats)
Party	Candidate	Votes	%	±%
Independent	Michael Wood*	435	43.3	
Conservative	Neil Pudney	407	40.5	
Labour	Una Norman	305	30.3	
Conservative	William Lewis	237	23.6	
BNP	Nev Saveall	178	17.7	
Liberal Democrats	Mark Elsden	110	10.9	
Turnout		~1,005	33.8	
Registered electors		2,973		
Independent hold				
Conservative hold				

=== Burnham-on-Crouch South ===
Burnham-on-Crouch South (2 seats)
Party	Candidate	Votes	%	±%
Conservative	Peter Elliot*	618	60.0	
Conservative	Ron Pratt	534	51.8	
Labour	Pauline Wells	282	27.4	
Democratic Alliance	Gillian Chaplin	216	21.0	
Labour	Mary Feakins	188	18.3	
Turnout		~1,030	33.7	
Registered electors		3,057		
Conservative hold				
Conservative gain from Labour				

=== Great Totham ===
Great Totham (2 seats)
Party	Candidate	Votes	%	±%
Conservative	David Sismey	Unopposed		
Conservative	Frank Delderfield*	Unopposed		
Registered electors		2,873		
Conservative hold				
Conservative hold				

=== Heybridge East ===
Heybridge East (2 seats)
Party	Candidate	Votes	%	±%
Conservative	Bryan Harker*	505	56.1	
Conservative	Ann Beale	488	54.2	
Democratic Alliance	Don Benson	410	45.6	
Turnout		~900	29.6	
Registered electors		3,039		
Conservative hold				
Conservative hold				

=== Heybridge West ===
Heybridge West (2 seats)
Party	Candidate	Votes	%	±%
Conservative	Alan Cheshire*	Unopposed		
Conservative	Miriam Lewis	Unopposed		
Registered electors		2,934		
Conservative hold				
Conservative hold				

=== Maldon East ===
Maldon East
Party	Candidate	Votes	%	±%
Conservative	Stephen Savage	221	50.1	
Labour	Paul Rew*	220	49.9	
Majority		1	0.2	
Turnout		441	28.2	
Registered electors		1,576		
Conservative gain from Labour		Swing		

=== Maldon North ===
Maldon North (2 seats)
Party	Candidate	Votes	%	±%
Democratic Alliance	Bill Stichbury*	572	55.2	
Conservative	Brian Mead*	550	53.1	
Conservative	Ian Jones	499	48.2	
Turnout		~1,034	33.8	
Registered electors		3,060		
Democratic Alliance hold				
Conservative hold				

=== Maldon South ===
Maldon South (2 seats)
Party	Candidate	Votes	%	±%
Conservative	Andrew Cain*	441	47.9	
Conservative	Brenda Keighley*	347	37.7	
Democratic Alliance	Sharon Riesebeck	283	30.8	
Labour	Michael Bentley	234	25.4	
UKIP	Michael Whiting	177	19.2	
Turnout		~920	30.6	
Registered electors		3,007		
Conservative hold				
Conservative hold				

=== Maldon West ===
Maldon West (2 seats)
Party	Candidate	Votes	%	±%
Conservative	Charles MacKenzie	Unopposed		
Conservative	David Williams	Unopposed		
Registered electors		3,008		
Conservative hold				
Conservative hold				

=== Mayland ===
Mayland (2 seats)
Party	Candidate	Votes	%	±%
Conservative	Penny Channer*	872	82.6	
Conservative	David Horner	754	71.4	
Labour	Maddy Diamond	138	13.1	
Turnout		~1,056	32.5	
Registered electors		3,249		
Conservative hold				
Conservative hold				

=== Purleigh ===
Purleigh (2 seats)
Party	Candidate	Votes	%	±%
Conservative	John Archer*	716	66.6	
Conservative	John Sears	566	52.7	
Democratic Alliance	Charles Litscher	344	32.0	
Democratic Alliance	Lewis Banyard	317	29.5	
Turnout		~1,073	41.0	
Registered electors		2,617		
Conservative hold				
Conservative gain from Independent				

=== Southminster ===
Southminster (2 seats)
Party	Candidate	Votes	%	±%
Independent	Brian Beale*	543	53.0	
Conservative	Helen Elliot	264	25.8	
Conservative	Simon Gutteridge	262	25.6	
Democratic Alliance	John Wilsdon	255	24.9	
BNP	Adrian Litscher	178	17.4	
BNP	Nev Saveall	176	17.2	
Labour	Norman Hunt	130	12.7	
Turnout		~1,026	33.8	
Registered electors		3,034		
Independent hold				
Conservative gain from Democratic Alliance				

=== Tillingham ===
Tillingham
Party	Candidate	Votes	%	±%
Democratic Alliance	Richard Dewick*	358	48.8	
Conservative	Adrian Fluker	306	41.7	
Labour	Cherie Archer	71	9.7	
Majority		52	7.1	
Turnout		735	43.1	
Registered electors		1,720		
Democratic Alliance hold		Swing		

=== Tollesbury ===
Tollesbury
Party	Candidate	Votes	%	±%
Independent	Ron Laurie*	422	68.0	
Conservative	Marion Peel*	199	32.0	
Majority		223	36.0	
Turnout		621	40.5	
Registered electors		1,557		
Independent hold		Swing		

=== Tolleshunt D'Arcy ===
Tolleshunt D'Arcy (2 seats)
Party	Candidate	Votes	%	±%
Conservative	Robert Long*	886	76.3	
Conservative	Alison Warr*	786	67.7	
Labour	Ron McKay	258	22.2	
Turnout		~1,162	37.0	
Registered electors		3,140		
Conservative hold				
Conservative hold				

=== Wickham Bishops & Woodham ===
Wickham Bishops & Woodham (2 seats)
Party	Candidate	Votes	%	±%
Conservative	David Howse*	Unopposed		
Conservative	Sheila Young*	Unopposed		
Registered electors		2,861		
Conservative hold				
Conservative hold				

== By-elections ==
Maldon North By-Election 7 August 2008
Party	Candidate	Votes	%	±%
Conservative	Anthony Shrimpton	339	40.8	−8.2
Green	Janet Carden	200	24.1	+24.1
Independent	Paul Rew	115	13.9	+13.9
BNP	Leonard Blain	107	12.9	+12.9
Independent	Geoffrey Harris	69	8.3	+8.3
Majority		139	16.7	
Turnout		830	26.5	
Conservative hold		Swing		
