= 1991 Maldon District Council election =

1991 English local election

- 2 May 1991

All 30 seats to Maldon District Council 16 seats needed for a majority

	First party	Second party	Third party
Party	Conservative	Independent	Liberal Democrats
Seats won	14	9	6
Seat change	▼1	▲7	▼5
Popular vote	8,936	6,576	4,600
Percentage	38.2%	28.1%	19.7%
Swing	▼4.7%	▲23.1%	▼21.8%
	Fourth party	Fifth party
Party	Labour	Ind. Conservative
Seats won	1	1
Seat change	Steady	▼1
Popular vote	2,448	824
Percentage	10.5%	3.5%
Swing	▲3.2%	▲0.2%
- Winner of each seat at the 1991 Maldon District Council election.
Control before election
No overall control
Control after election
No overall control

The 1991 Maldon District Council election took place on 2 May 1991 to elect members of Maldon District Council in Essex, England. This was on the same day as other local elections.

== Summary ==
=== Election result ===
1991 Maldon District Council election
Party	Candidates	Seats	Gains	Losses	Net gain/loss	Seats %	Votes %	Votes	+/−
Conservative	27	13	4	5	▼1	45.2	38.2	8,936	–4.7
Independent	19	9	7	0	▲7	29.0	28.1	6,576	+23.1
Liberal Democrats	11	6	2	7	▼5	19.4	19.7	4,600	–21.8
Labour	8	1	0	0	Steady	3.2	10.5	2,448	+3.2
Ind. Conservative	1	1	0	1	▼1	3.2	3.5	824	+0.2

== Ward results ==
Incumbent councillors standing for re-election are marked with an asterisk (*). Changes in seats do not take into account by-elections or defections.

=== Althorne ===
Althorne
Party	Candidate	Votes	%	±%
Conservative	R. Boyce*	Unopposed		
Registered electors		1,753		
Conservative hold				

=== Burnham-on-Crouch North ===
Burnham-on-Crouch North
Party	Candidate	Votes	%	±%
Independent	M. Wood	487	54.2	
Conservative	J. Vallance*	411	45.8	
Majority		76	8.4	
Turnout		898	44.0	
Registered electors		2,039		
Independent gain from Conservative		Swing		

=== Burnham-on-Crouch South ===
Burnham-on-Crouch South (3 seats)
Party	Candidate	Votes	%	±%
Conservative	R. Buck	722	30.4	
Independent	T. Martin	652	27.4	
Conservative	J. Smith*	589	24.8	
Conservative	L. Hobday	564	23.7	
Liberal Democrats	J. Gillbee*	369	15.5	
Labour	E. Ellis	330	13.9	
Independent	G. Blaney*	302	12.7	
Turnout		~2,376	66.6	
Registered electors		3,568		
Conservative gain from Liberal Democrats				
Independent gain from Liberal Democrats				
Conservative hold				

=== Cold Norton ===
Cold Norton
Party	Candidate	Votes	%	±%
Liberal Democrats	M. Kennedy	394	49.3	
Conservative	G. Broyd*	262	32.8	
Independent	R. Roe	143	17.9	
Majority		132	16.5	
Turnout		799	57.3	
Registered electors		1,395		
Liberal Democrats gain from Conservative		Swing		

=== Goldhanger ===
Goldhanger
Party	Candidate	Votes	%	±%
Conservative	R. Hendry	456	72.3	
Labour	C. Dykes	175	27.7	
Majority		281	44.6	
Turnout		631	51.0	
Registered electors		1,237		
Conservative hold		Swing		

=== Great Totham ===
Great Totham (2 seats)
Party	Candidate	Votes	%	±%
Conservative	F. Delderfield*	Unopposed		
Conservative	R. Bass*	Unopposed		
Registered electors		2,405		
Conservative hold				
Conservative hold				

=== Heybridge East ===
Heybridge East
Party	Candidate	Votes	%	±%
Liberal Democrats	H. Cocking*	564	52.6	
Conservative	G. Westwood	509	47.4	
Majority		55	5.2	
Turnout		1,073	37.6	
Registered electors		2,852		
Liberal Democrats hold		Swing		

=== Heybridge West ===
Heybridge West (2 seats)
Party	Candidate	Votes	%	±%
Liberal Democrats	P. Mead*	625	60.4	
Liberal Democrats	I. Thorn	484	46.8	
Conservative	E. Whitthread	149	14.4	
Independent	B. Harker	142	13.7	
Conservative	B. Whitthread	132	12.8	
Labour	J. Lees	119	11.5	
Turnout		~1,035	52.7	
Registered electors		1,964		
Liberal Democrats hold				
Liberal Democrats hold				

=== Maldon East ===
Maldon East (2 seats)
Party	Candidate	Votes	%	±%
Labour	E. Bannister*	437	38.5	
Liberal Democrats	S. Arnold*	378	33.3	
Independent	B. Mead	322	28.3	
Independent	E. Vale	268	23.6	
Liberal Democrats	D. Ind	262	23.1	
Conservative	N. Prior	170	15.0	
Conservative	R. Long	158	13.9	
Turnout		~1,136	55.6	
Registered electors		2,044		
Labour hold				
Liberal Democrats hold				

=== Maldon North West ===
Maldon North West (3 seats)
Party	Candidate	Votes	%	±%
Ind. Conservative	R. Pipe*	824	45.3	
Conservative	R. Daws*	634	34.8	
Liberal Democrats	S. Longhurst	579	31.8	
Conservative	K. Munnion	475	26.1	
Labour	A. Lamb	418	23.0	
Labour	A. Josselyn	385	21.2	
Independent	G. Coulthread	298	16.4	
Turnout		~1,820	57.8	
Registered electors		3,149		
Ind. Conservative hold				
Conservative hold				
Liberal Democrats gain from Conservative				

=== Maldon South ===
Maldon South (2 seats)
Party	Candidate	Votes	%	±%
Conservative	E. Dines	592	49.0	
Conservative	T. Kelly	537	44.5	
Liberal Democrats	L. Ovenden	371	30.7	
Liberal Democrats	J. Woodham	333	27.6	
Labour	P. Roberts	322	26.7	
Labour	S. Watmough	262	21.7	
Independent	F. Clements	117	9.7	
Independent	R. Hornett*	94	7.8	
Turnout		~1,208	37.8	
Registered electors		3,196		
Conservative gain from Liberal Democrats				
Conservative gain from Liberal Democrats				

=== Purleigh ===
Purleigh
Party	Candidate	Votes	%	±%
Independent	L. Cooper	242	39.5	
Conservative	B. Ascott	201	32.8	
Independent	L. Banyard	170	27.7	
Majority		41	6.7	
Turnout		613	51.9	
Registered electors		1,180		
Independent gain from Liberal Democrats		Swing		

=== Southminster ===
Southminster (2 seats)
Party	Candidate	Votes	%	±%
Independent	B. Beale*	681	71.7	
Conservative	P. Ryall	314	33.1	
Conservative	V. Smith	223	23.5	
Turnout		~950	39.3	
Registered electors		2,418		
Independent hold				
Conservative hold				

=== St. Lawrence ===
St. Lawrence
Party	Candidate	Votes	%	±%
Independent	R. Cowell*	Unopposed		
Registered electors		1,091		
Independent gain from Ind. Conservative				

=== The Maylands ===
The Maylands
Party	Candidate	Votes	%	±%
Conservative	F. Ashford*	460	50.5	
Independent	D. Abernethy	450	49.5	
Majority		10	1.1	
Turnout		910	38.9	
Registered electors		2,339		
Conservative hold		Swing		

=== Tillingham & Bradwell ===
Tillingham & Bradwell
Party	Candidate	Votes	%	±%
Conservative	R. Dewick	293	54.9	
Liberal Democrats	K. Windmill	241	45.1	
Majority		52	9.8	
Turnout		534	39.9	
Registered electors		1,340		
Conservative gain from Liberal Democrats		Swing		

=== Tollesbury ===
Tollesbury (2 seats)
Party	Candidate	Votes	%	±%
Independent	R. Laurie	807	71.0	
Independent	B. McGhee	792	69.7	
Conservative	N. Butt*	345	30.3	
Conservative	J. Juniper*	329	28.9	
Turnout		~1,137	59.0	
Registered electors		1,927		
Independent gain from Conservative				
Independent gain from Conservative				

=== Tolleshunt D'Arcy ===
Tolleshunt D'Arcy
Party	Candidate	Votes	%	±%
Conservative	M. Peel*	Unopposed		
Registered electors		1,461		
Conservative hold				

=== Wickham Bishops ===
Wickham Bishops
Party	Candidate	Votes	%	±%
Independent	T. Allard*	609	54.4	
Conservative	H. Bass	511	45.6	
Majority		98	8.8	
Turnout		1,120	69.7	
Registered electors		1,606		
Independent gain from Liberal Democrats		Swing		

=== Woodham ===
Woodham
Party	Candidate	Votes	%	±%
Independent	P. Herrmann*	Unopposed		
Registered electors		1,235		
Independent hold				
