= 1973 Maldon District Council election =

1973 English local election

- 10 May 1973

All 30 seats to Maldon District Council 16 seats needed for a majority
- Registered: 31,339
- Turnout: ~51.5%

	First party	Second party	Third party
Party	Conservative	Independent	Labour
Seats won	11	11	4
Popular vote	13,629	8,924	8,328
Percentage	34.9%	22.9%	21.3%
	Fourth party	Fifth party
Party	Liberal	Independent Labour
Seats won	3	1
Popular vote	6,656	1,473
Percentage	17.1%	3.8%
Council control after election
No overall control

The 1973 Maldon District Council election took place on 10 May 1973 to elect members of Maldon District Council in Essex, England. This was on the same day as other local elections.

This was the inaugural election to Maldon District Council following its establishment by the Local Government Act 1972.

== Summary ==
=== Election result ===
1973 Maldon District Council election
Party	Candidates	Seats	Gains	Losses	Net gain/loss	Seats %	Votes %	Votes	+/−
Conservative	23	11	N/A	N/A	N/A	36.7	34.9	13,629	N/A
Independent	30	11	N/A	N/A	N/A	36.7	22.9	8,924	N/A
Labour	12	4	N/A	N/A	N/A	13.3	21.3	8,328	N/A
Liberal	11	3	N/A	N/A	N/A	10.0	17.1	6,656	N/A
Independent Labour	1	1	N/A	N/A	N/A	3.3	3.8	1,473	N/A

== Ward results ==
=== Cold Norton ===
Cold Norton
Party	Candidate	Votes	%
Independent	B. Board	314	58.3
Independent	G. Hooper	225	41.7
Majority		89	16.6
Turnout		539	57.5
Registered electors		937	
Independent win (new seat)			

=== Goldhanger ===
Goldhanger
Party	Candidate	Votes	%
Conservative	H. Frost	397	75.3
Independent	B. Thompson	130	24.7
Majority		267	50.6
Turnout		527	51.0
Registered electors		1,034	
Conservative win (new seat)			

=== Great Totham ===
Great Totham (2 seats)
Party	Candidate	Votes	%
Conservative	R. Bass	613	55.6
Conservative	F. Anderson	546	49.5
Independent	T. Martin	490	44.5
Turnout		~1,102	55.3
Registered electors		1,993	
Conservative win (new seat)			
Conservative win (new seat)			

=== No. 1 (Maldon) ===
No. 1 (Maldon) (7 seats)
Party	Candidate	Votes	%
Independent Labour	W. Hutchinson	1,473	28.9
Conservative	C. Dowsett	1,410	27.6
Conservative	R. Daws	1,331	26.1
Conservative	D. Sewell	1,224	24.0
Labour	G. Hughes	1,129	22.1
Liberal	N. Smith	1,088	21.3
Labour	E. Bannister	1,076	21.1
Liberal	B. Manaton	1,039	20.4
Conservative	O. Cruess	968	19.0
Conservative	K. Munnion	949	18.6
Labour	G. Cockell	932	18.3
Labour	P. Roberts	882	17.3
Conservative	C. Backus	863	16.9
Labour	J. Lewis	830	16.3
Conservative	R. Townsend	825	16.2
Labour	N. Hutchings	816	16.0
Labour	H. Salt	743	14.6
Liberal	J. Tilley	624	12.2
Liberal	J. Tilley	619	12.1
Liberal	J. Davies	617	12.1
Liberal	W. Judd	615	12.1
Liberal	M. Kinghorn	570	11.2
Turnout		~5,103	65.4
Registered electors		7,803	
Independent Labour win (new seat)			
Conservative win (new seat)			
Conservative win (new seat)			
Conservative win (new seat)			
Labour win (new seat)			
Liberal win (new seat)			
Labour win (new seat)			

=== No. 2 (Heybridge) ===
No. 2 (Heybridge) (3 seats)
Party	Candidate	Votes	%
Labour	P. Darney	461	37.5
Labour	D. Hutchings	439	35.7
Liberal	P. Manaton	417	33.9
Labour	I. Hillman	387	31.5
Liberal	J. Church	355	28.9
Conservative	P. Mann	352	28.6
Liberal	A. Tumilty	344	28.0
Conservative	P. North	338	27.5
Conservative	P. Reeve	336	27.3
Turnout		~1,230	48.4
Registered electors		2,542	
Labour win (new seat)			
Labour win (new seat)			
Liberal win (new seat)			

=== No. 3 (Burnham-on-Crouch) ===
No. 3 (Burnham-on-Crouch) (4 seats)
Party	Candidate	Votes	%
Independent	J. Dowding	1,132	67.3
Independent	M. Freeman	726	43.2
Independent	E. Samuel	726	43.2
Independent	G. Worthington	598	35.6
Conservative	L. Bavage	549	32.7
Conservative	G. Herbert	426	25.3
Independent	A. Bacon	383	22.8
Conservative	K. Staniland	346	20.6
Independent	R. Berry	340	20.2
Turnout		~1,681	43.9
Registered electors		3,829	
Independent win (new seat)			
Independent win (new seat)			
Independent win (new seat)			
Independent win (new seat)			

=== No. 7 (Althorne & Mayland) ===
No. 7 (Althorne & Mayland)
Party	Candidate	Votes	%
Independent	D. Abernethy	284	52.2
Conservative	L. Manley	260	47.8
Majority		24	4.4
Turnout		544	36.9
Registered electors		1,476	
Independent win (new seat)			

=== No. 8 (Latchingdon) ===
No. 8 (Latchingdon)
Party	Candidate	Votes	%
Conservative	D. Heritage	197	41.9
Independent	P. Smith	192	40.9
Independent	A. Adkin	81	17.2
Majority		5	1.0
Turnout		470	40.4
Registered electors		1,164	
Conservative win (new seat)			

=== Purleigh ===
Purleigh
Party	Candidate	Votes	%
Independent	G. Barber	324	47.4
Independent	D. Baker	216	31.6
Independent	H. Binder	144	21.1
Majority		108	15.8
Turnout		684	63.3
Registered electors		1,081	
Independent win (new seat)			

=== Southminster ===
Southminster (2 seats)
Party	Candidate	Votes	%
Liberal	C. Kelly	368	51.8
Independent	D. Fisher	341	48.0
Independent	R. Penny	252	35.5
Independent	F. James	161	22.7
Turnout		~710	32.1
Registered electors		2,212	
Liberal win (new seat)			
Independent win (new seat)			

=== St. Lawrence ===
St. Lawrence
Party	Candidate	Votes	%
Independent	R. Sennitt	209	63.9
Independent	G. Wager	74	22.6
Independent	A. Cottam	44	13.5
Majority		135	41.3
Turnout		327	38.8
Registered electors		842	
Independent win (new seat)			

=== Tillingham & Bradwell ===
Tillingham & Bradwell
Party	Candidate	Votes	%
Independent	K. Bruce	171	34.5
Independent	W. Proctor	168	33.9
Conservative	R. Bennett	99	20.0
Independent	G. Harrod	58	11.7
Majority		3	0.6
Turnout		496	43.1
Registered electors		1,152	
Independent win (new seat)			

=== Tollesbury ===
Tollesbury (2 seats)
Party	Candidate	Votes	%
Conservative	J. Madden	543	57.0
Conservative	G. Butt	393	41.3
Labour	J. Jackson	365	38.3
Labour	J. Young	268	28.2
Independent	A. Langdon	44	4.6
Turnout		~952	61.7
Registered electors		1,543	
Conservative win (new seat)			
Conservative win (new seat)			

=== Tolleshunt D'Arcy ===
Tolleshunt D'Arcy
Party	Candidate	Votes	%
Conservative	E. Peel	293	52.5
Independent	M. Harker	265	47.5
Majority		28	5.0
Turnout		558	44.6
Registered electors		1,252	
Conservative win (new seat)			

=== Wickham Bishops ===
Wickham Bishops
Party	Candidate	Votes	%
Conservative	L. Bass	371	60.8
Independent	C. Greenhill	239	39.2
Majority		132	21.6
Turnout		610	46.3
Registered electors		1,317	
Conservative win (new seat)			

=== Woodham ===
Woodham
Party	Candidate	Votes	%
Independent	P. Herrmann	353	59.5
Independent	E. Ratcliffe	240	40.5
Majority		113	19.0
Turnout		593	51.0
Registered electors		1,162	
Independent win (new seat)			
