= 2023 Maldon District Council election =

2023 local election in England

- 4 May 2023

All 31 seats to Maldon District Council 16 seats needed for a majority

	First party	Second party	Third party
Leader	Penny Channer	Richard Siddall
Party	Conservative	MDIG	Independent
Last election	17 seats, 45.8%	N/A	14 seats, 48.1%
Seats before	14	11	6
Seats won	10	7	7
Seat change	▼7	▲7	▼7
Popular vote	8,705	5,239	3,973
Percentage	33.9%	20.4%	15.5%
Swing	▼11.9%	N/A	▼32.6%
	Fourth party	Fifth party
Party	Liberal Democrats	Labour
Last election	N/A	0 seats, 5.4%
Seats before	1	0
Seats won	6	1
Seat change	▲6	▲1
Popular vote	5,535	1,784
Percentage	21.6%	7.0%
Swing	N/A	▲1.6%
- Winner of each seat at the 2023 Maldon District Council election
Leader before election
Penny Channer
Conservative
No overall control
Leader after election
Richard Siddall
MDIG
No overall control

The 2023 Maldon District Council election took place on 4 May 2023 to elect members of Maldon District Council in Essex, England. This was on the same day as other local elections.

== Summary ==
The result at the 2019 election was 17 Conservative and 14 Independent councillors. Following resignations and splits amongst both the Conservatives and the Independent Group, and two by-elections, the political make up at January 2022 was 10 Conservative, 3 non-aligned Conservatives, 11 Independent Group, 6 non-aligned Independents, and one vacant seat. Penny Channer, a Conservative, was appointed leader of the council at a meeting on 18 January 2022, effectively leading a Conservative minority administration. She chose not to stand for re-election.

Prior to the 2023 election the council was under no overall control. The Conservatives ran the council, with the Maldon District Independent Group in opposition. The Liberal Democrats elected a first councillor in a by-election in 2022, and stood a record number of candidates in these elections.

After the election the council remained under no overall control. After some weeks of post-election discussions between the councillors, Richard Siddall, leader of the Maldon District Independent Group, was appointed leader of the council on 8 June 2023.

=== Election result ===
The overall results were:

2023 Maldon District Council election
Party	Candidates	Seats	Gains	Losses	Net gain/loss	Seats %	Votes %	Votes	+/−
Conservative	24	10	2	9	▼7	32.3	33.9	8,705	–11.9
MDIG	13	7	7	0	▲7	22.6	20.4	5,239	N/A
Independent	14	7	2	9	▼7	22.6	15.5	3,973	–32.6
Liberal Democrats	18	6	6	0	▲6	19.4	21.6	5,535	N/A
Labour	8	1	1	0	▲1	3.2	7.0	1,784	+1.6
Green	3	0	0	0	Steady	0.0	1.6	423	N/A

== Ward results ==
The Statement of Persons Nominated, which details the candidates standing in each ward, was released by Maldon District Council following the close of nominations on 5 April 2023.

Seat gains/losses are compared to the 2019 election and do not take into account by-elections or defections. The results for each ward were:

=== Althorne ===
Althorne (2 seats)
Party	Candidate	Votes	%	±%
MDIG	Tony Fittock	675	63.6	N/A
MDIG	Mark Bassenger*	512	48.3	N/A
Conservative	Clint Bardwell	390	36.8	–9.5
Liberal Democrats	Peter Wynn	115	10.8	N/A
Turnout		1,061	31.4	+2.0
Registered electors		3,382		
MDIG gain from Conservative				
MDIG gain from Independent				

=== Burnham-on-Crouch North ===
Burnham-on-Crouch North (2 seats)
Party	Candidate	Votes	%	±%
Independent	Wendy Stamp*	927	76.4	–6.9
Labour	Una Siddall-Norman	391	32.2	+17.2
Conservative	Anne Hull*	362	29.8	–2.1
Liberal Democrats	Blake Matthews	170	14.0	N/A
Turnout		1,214	31.1	–4.9
Registered electors		3,902		
Independent hold				
Labour gain from Conservative				

=== Burnham-on-Crouch South ===
Burnham-on-Crouch South (2 seats)
Party	Candidate	Votes	%	±%
Independent	Vanessa Bell*	531	50.5	–14.7
Conservative	Doug Bown	358	34.0	+10.2
Independent	Jennie Donnelly	296	28.1	N/A
Labour	Jackie Brown	168	16.0	+4.5
MDIG	Stephen Stratton	105	10.0	N/A
Green	Claire White	97	9.2	N/A
Green	James Taylor	83	7.9	N/A
Liberal Democrats	Eileen Rowlands	67	6.4	N/A
Independent	Joscelyn McInnes	42	4.0	N/A
Turnout		1,052	32.6	–2.0
Registered electors		3,223		
Independent hold				
Conservative gain from Independent				

=== Great Totham ===
Great Totham (2 seats)
Party	Candidate	Votes	%	±%
MDIG	Richard Siddall*	670	53.3	N/A
MDIG	Jade Hughes	591	47.1	N/A
Conservative	John Keyes*	427	34.0	–21.0
Conservative	Nicholas Snelling	345	27.5	–28.3
Green	Isobel Doubleday	243	19.3	N/A
Liberal Democrats	Deirdre Haslam	75	6.0	N/A
Turnout		1,256	42.0	
Registered electors		2,994		
MDIG gain from Conservative				
MDIG gain from Conservative				

=== Heybridge East ===
Heybridge East (2 seats)
Party	Candidate	Votes	%	±%
Liberal Democrats	Nick Spenceley	504	51.3	N/A
Liberal Democrats	Nikki Swindle	441	44.9	N/A
Conservative	Anne Beale*	316	32.2	–17.0
MDIG	Colin Edmond	299	30.4	N/A
Conservative	Bruce Heubner*	259	26.4	–27.6
Turnout		982	30.6	+3.0
Registered electors		3,206		
Liberal Democrats gain from Conservative				
Liberal Democrats gain from Conservative				

=== Heybridge West ===
Heybridge West (2 seats)
Party	Candidate	Votes	%	±%
Liberal Democrats	Paula Spenceley*	539	67.0	N/A
Liberal Democrats	Simon Burwood	475	59.1	N/A
Conservative	Hayley Board	195	24.3	–15.2
MDIG	Michael Edwards*	174	21.6	N/A
Turnout		804	23.5	+0.8
Registered electors		3,429		
Liberal Democrats gain from Independent				
Liberal Democrats gain from Independent				

=== Maldon East ===
Maldon East
Party	Candidate	Votes	%	±%
Independent	Andrew Lay	153	37.9	N/A
Independent	Christopher Swain*	130	32.2	–18.5
Conservative	Robert Roe	121	30.0	+6.3
Majority		23	5.7	N/A
Turnout		411	22.8	–1.9
Registered electors		1,803		
Independent gain from Independent		Swing	N/A	

=== Maldon North ===
Maldon North (2 seats)
Party	Candidate	Votes	%	±%
Liberal Democrats	Kevin Jennings	736	63.0	N/A
Conservative	Nigel Miller	401	34.3	+3.6
MDIG	Carlie Mayes*	375	32.1	N/A
Labour	Robert Shrimpton	248	21.2	N/A
Turnout		1,168	34.9	+0.8
Registered electors		3,347		
Liberal Democrats gain from Independent				
Conservative gain from Independent				

=== Maldon South ===
Maldon South (2 seats)
Party	Candidate	Votes	%	±%
Independent	Kevin Lagan*	528	52.6	–12.5
MDIG	Jeanette Stilts*	424	42.2	N/A
Conservative	Martin Harvey	361	36.0	+4.4
Conservative	Paul Hole	264	26.3	+0.3
Liberal Democrats	John Main	202	20.1	N/A
Turnout		1,004	33.3	+0.1
Registered electors		3,014		
Independent hold				
MDIG gain from Independent				

=== Maldon West ===
Maldon West (2 seats)
Party	Candidate	Votes	%	±%
Liberal Democrats	John Driver	552	43.3	N/A
MDIG	Flo Shaughnessy*	550	43.1	N/A
Liberal Democrats	Robert Jones	432	33.9	N/A
Conservative	Jhual Hafiz	277	21.7	+3.0
MDIG	Lisa Cullumbine	271	21.2	N/A
Labour	John Joyce	124	9.7	N/A
Independent	Tom Kelly	89	7.0	N/A
Turnout		1,276	34.2	–5.9
Registered electors		3,734		
Liberal Democrats gain from Independent				
MDIG gain from Independent				

=== Mayland ===
Mayland (2 seats)
Party	Candidate	Votes	%	±%
Independent	Linda Haywood	617	61.9	N/A
Conservative	Wendy Laybourn	390	39.1	N/A
Conservative	Linda Pailing	278	27.9	N/A
Liberal Democrats	James Eley	225	22.6	N/A
Turnout		997	29.3	N/A
Registered electors		3,407		
Independent gain from Conservative				
Conservative hold				

=== Purleigh ===
Purleigh (2 seats)
Party	Candidate	Votes	%	±%
Conservative	Sue White*	558	61.1	–1.4
Conservative	Lisa Wiffen	481	52.7	–14.0
Labour	Pamela Calabro	185	20.3	N/A
Liberal Democrats	Lynne Harrington	180	19.7	N/A
MDIG	Ashley Jones	125	13.7	N/A
Independent	Neil Page	86	9.4	N/A
Independent	Bridget Eyre	41	4.5	N/A
Turnout		913	31.0	–3.0
Registered electors		2,950		
Conservative hold				
Conservative hold				

=== Southminster ===
Southminster (2 seats)
Party	Candidate	Votes	%	±%
Independent	Adrian Fluker	533	58.7	N/A
Conservative	Ron Pratt	339	37.3	+6.7
Labour	Timothy Aves	182	20.0	N/A
Liberal Democrats	Ben Bhattacharya	130	14.3	N/A
Turnout		802	22.6	–3.8
Registered electors		3,547		
Independent gain from Independent				
Conservative hold				

=== Tillingham ===
Tillingham
Party	Candidate	Votes	%	±%
Independent	Matthew Neall	Unopposed		
Registered electors		N/A		
Independent gain from Conservative				

=== Tollesbury ===
Tollesbury
Party	Candidate	Votes	%	±%
MDIG	Emma Stephens*	468	75.1	N/A
Conservative	Deborah Keating	116	18.6	–53.9
Liberal Democrats	Ross Woolfenden	39	6.3	N/A
Majority		352	56.5	N/A
Turnout		625	38.6	+1.8
Registered electors		1,621		
MDIG gain from Conservative		Swing	N/A	

=== Tolleshunt D'Arcy ===
Tolleshunt D'Arcy (2 seats)
Party	Candidate	Votes	%	±%
Conservative	Clive Morley*	581	56.2	–9.2
Conservative	Maddie Thompson*	607	58.8	–15.9
Liberal Democrats	John Beal	408	39.5	N/A
Turnout		1,033	30.3	–1.5
Registered electors		3,406		
Conservative hold				
Conservative hold				

=== Wickham Bishops and Woodham ===
Wickham Bishops and Woodham (2 seats)
Party	Candidate	Votes	%	±%
Conservative	Mark Durham*	644	58.2	+1.2
Conservative	Simon Morgan	635	57.4	–7.8
Labour	Jane Williams	260	23.5	+9.1
Liberal Democrats	Anne Church	245	22.1	N/A
Labour	David Baker	226	20.4	N/A
Turnout		1,107	37.7	–3.5
Registered electors		2,933		
Conservative hold				
Conservative hold				

== Post-election ==
=== Affiliation changes ===
- Sue White, elected as a Conservative, left the party in June 2023 to sit as an independent, before returning to the Conservative group later in 2023.
- Jeanette Stilts, elected for the Maldon District Independent Group, subsequently sat instead in the 'District Support Group' of independent councillors.
- Vanessa Bell, elected as an independent for Burnham-on-Crouch South, joined the Party of Women in July 2024.
- Matthew Neall (Tillingham) and Adrian Fluker (Southminster), both previously members of the Residents Alliance group, joined Reform UK in February 2026.
- Kevin Jennings, elected as a Liberal Democrat for Maldon North, subsequently sat with the Maldon District Independent Group.

=== By-elections ===
==== Maldon North ====
The Maldon North by-election was triggered by the resignation of Conservative councillor Nigel Miller.

Maldon North by-election: 27 March 2025
Party	Candidate	Votes	%	±%
Conservative	James Burrell-Cook	462	41.1	+18.3
Liberal Democrats	Robert Jones	409	36.4	–5.4
Reform	Joe Ross	187	16.7	N/A
Green	Isobel Doubleday	65	5.8	N/A
Majority		53	4.7	N/A
Turnout		1,126	33.2	–1.7
Registered electors		3,397		
Conservative hold		Swing	▲11.9	

==== Maldon West ====
By-election triggered by death of Maldon District Independent Group councillor Flo Shaughnessy.

Maldon West by-election: 29 May 2025
Party	Candidate	Votes	%	±%
Liberal Democrats	Sarah Dodsley	573	41.5	+6.8
Reform	Gary Robert Power	488	35.3	N/A
Conservative	Jhual Hafiz	204	14.8	–2.6
MDIG	Carlie Mayes	83	6.0	–28.5
Green	Janet Mary Band	33	2.4	N/A
Majority		85	6.2	N/A
Turnout		1,381	33.1	–1.1
Registered electors		4,172		
Liberal Democrats gain from MDIG				
