= Party of Women =

Single-issue political party in the United Kingdom

- Abbreviation: POW
- Leader: Kellie-Jay Keen-Minshull
- Nominating officer: Paul Duddridge
- Treasurer: Kellie-Jay Keen
- Founded: 2023; 3 years ago
- Registered: 8 February 2024; 2 years ago
- Headquarters: Bath, Somerset, South West England
- Ideology: Gender critical ideology Anti-transgender
- Colours: Black, white, magenta and turquoise
- House of Commons: 0 / 650
- Councillors: 1 / 18,766

Election symbol

Website
- www.partyofwomen.org

The Party of Women (POW) is a gender-critical and anti-transgender single-issue political party in the United Kingdom, which opposes what it refers to as "trans ideology". It was founded in 2023 by Kellie-Jay Keen-Minshull (also known as Posie Parker) and registered in February 2024.

== History ==
The first application to register the party with the Electoral Commission was rejected in September 2023, due to issues with the proposed constitution and financial schemes. Following an additional failed application in November, the party was formally registered in February 2024. The party has aligned itself with Keen-Minshull's views.

On 1 March, the party issued an announcement, committing it to revoke the Gender Recognition Act 2004, and stating that it would reinforce the rights of cisgender women and girls.

The Party of Women stood five candidates in the 2024 local elections, receiving a total of 509 votes with no candidates being elected.

A total of 16 candidates stood for the party at the 2024 United Kingdom general election, receiving a total of 5,077 votes. Keen stood in the new Bristol Central constituency but lost her deposit after gaining only 0.5% of the vote.

== Election results ==
House of Commons of the United Kingdom
Election year	Total candidates	Total votes	%	Seats won	Rank
2024	16	5,077	0.02	0	34

== Local government ==
The party has never won any election to a local council in England or Wales. It has only ever obtained councillors through defection.

Cllr Mandy Clare of Cheshire West and Chester Council defected to the party in March 2024, having left Labour, giving the party their first representative in local government. Clare left the party a few months later in July 2024 to sit as an Independent, before joining Reform UK, then subsequently being arrested for assault. The charges were later dropped due to insufficient evicence.

Cllr Vanessa Bell of Maldon District Council in Essex defected to the party, currently serving as their only elected representative. Bell represents the ward of Burnham-on-Crouch South.

== See also ==
- Women's Equality Party
