= 2019 Maldon District Council election =

2019 English local election

- 2 May 2019

All 31 seats to Maldon District Council 16 seats needed for a majority

	First party	Second party	Third party
Party	Conservative	Independent	UKIP
Seats won	17	14	0
Seat change	▼11	▲12	▼1
Popular vote	11,575	12,001	155
Percentage	46.1%	47.8%	0.6%
Swing	▼12.2%	▲32.5%	▼6.9%
- Winner of each seat at the 2019 Maldon District Council election.
Control before election
Conservative
Control after election
Conservative

The 2019 Maldon District Council election took place on 2 May 2019 to elect members of Maldon District Council in Essex, England. This was on the same day as other local elections.

== Summary ==
=== Election result ===
2019 Maldon District Council election
Party	Candidates	Seats	Gains	Losses	Net gain/loss	Seats %	Votes %	Votes	+/−
Conservative	29	17	0	11	▼11	54.8	46.1	11,575	–12.2
Independent	26	14	12	0	▲12	45.2	47.8	12,001	+32.5
Labour	8	0	0	0	Steady	0.0	5.4	1,365	–4.1
UKIP	1	0	0	1	▼1	0.0	0.6	155	–6.9

== Ward results ==
Incumbent councillors standing for re-election are marked with an asterisk (*).

=== Althorne ===
Althorne (2 seats)
Party	Candidate	Votes	%	±%
Independent	Mark Bassenger	531	52.0	
Conservative	Bob Boyce*	468	45.8	
Conservative	Linda Pailing	369	36.1	
Labour	Joshua Allen	185	18.1	
Turnout		1,021	29.4	
Registered electors		3,471		
Independent gain from UKIP				
Conservative hold				

=== Burnham-on-Crouch North ===
Burnham-on-Crouch North (2 seats)
Party	Candidate	Votes	%	±%
Independent	Wendy Stamp	930	83.3	
Conservative	Anne Hull	356	31.9	
Conservative	Neil Pudney*	270	24.2	
Labour	Jackie Brown	167	15.0	
Turnout		1,117	36.0	
Registered electors		3,105		
Independent gain from Conservative				
Conservative hold				

=== Burnham-on-Crouch South ===
Burnham-on-Crouch South (2 seats)
Party	Candidate	Votes	%	±%
Independent	Nick Skeens	771	73.3	
Independent	Vanessa Bell	740	70.3	
Conservative	Ron Pratt*	270	25.7	
Conservative	Peter Elliott*	193	18.3	
Labour	Leslie McDonald	131	12.5	
Turnout		1,145	34.6	
Registered electors		3,311		
Independent gain from Conservative				
Independent gain from Conservative				

=== Great Totham ===
Great Totham (2 seats)
Party	Candidate	Votes	%	±%
Conservative	Richard Siddall	714	55.8	
Conservative	John Keyes*	704	55.0	
Independent	Jade Hughes	483	37.8	
Independent	Mark Fullbrook	267	20.9	
Labour	Karen Corley	126	9.9	
Turnout		1,279	42.8	
Registered electors		2,988		
Conservative hold				
Conservative hold				

=== Heybridge East ===
Heybridge East (2 seats)
Party	Candidate	Votes	%	±%
Conservative	Bryan Harker*	471	52.0	
Conservative	Anne Beale*	429	47.4	
Independent	Carey Martin	369	40.8	
Independent	Richard Perry	359	39.7	
Turnout		905	27.6	
Registered electors		3,284		
Conservative hold				
Conservative hold				

=== Heybridge West ===
Heybridge West (2 seats)
Party	Candidate	Votes	%	±%
Independent	Michael Edwards	423	58.5	
Independent	Chrisy Morris	283	39.1	
Conservative	Ian Dobson*	277	38.3	
Conservative	Robert Long	224	31.0	
Turnout		723	22.7	
Registered electors		3,184		
Independent gain from Conservative				
Independent gain from Conservative				

=== Maldon East ===
Maldon East
Party	Candidate	Votes	%	±%
Independent	Christopher Swain	224	48.6	
Independent	David Ogg	123	26.7	
Conservative	Stephen Savage*	114	24.7	
Majority		101	21.9	
Turnout		472	24.7	
Registered electors		1,910		
Independent gain from Conservative		Swing		

=== Maldon North ===
Maldon North (2 seats)
Party	Candidate	Votes	%	±%
Independent	Stephen Nunn	763	65.9	
Independent	Carlie Mayes	367	31.7	
Conservative	Richie Miller	347	30.0	
Conservative	Tony Shrimpton*	310	26.8	
Independent	Michael Pearlman*	256	22.1	
Turnout		1,158	34.1	
Registered electors		3,396		
Independent gain from Conservative				
Independent gain from Conservative				

=== Maldon South ===
Maldon South (2 seats)
Party	Candidate	Votes	%	±%
Independent	Kevin Lagan	663	65.1	
Independent	Jeanette Stilts	475	46.6	
Conservative	Andrew Cain*	322	31.6	
Conservative	Brenda Harker*	265	26.0	
Labour	Wayne Frostick	150	14.7	
Turnout		1,019	33.2	
Registered electors		3,070		
Independent gain from Conservative				
Independent gain from Conservative				

=== Maldon West ===
Maldon West (2 seats)
Party	Candidate	Votes	%	±%
Independent	Mark Heard*	1,039	83.1	
Independent	Flo Shaughnessy*	894	71.5	
Conservative	Jhual Hafiz	233	18.6	
Turnout		1,250	40.1	
Registered electors		3,121		
Independent hold				
Independent gain from Conservative				

=== Mayland ===
Mayland (2 seats)
Party	Candidate	Votes	%	±%
Conservative	Penny Channer*	Unopposed		
Conservative	Michael Helm*	Unopposed		
Registered electors				
Conservative hold				
Conservative hold				

=== Purleigh ===
Purleigh (2 seats)
Party	Candidate	Votes	%	±%
Conservative	Jane Fleming	625	65.4	
Conservative	Sue White*	586	61.3	
Independent	Tina Gentry	266	27.8	
Independent	Chris van Rossum	249	26.0	
Turnout		956	34.0	
Registered electors		2,809		
Conservative hold				
Conservative hold				

=== Southminster ===
Southminster (2 seats)
Party	Candidate	Votes	%	±%
Independent	Brian Beale*	576	63.4	
Conservative	Adrian Fluker*	410	45.2	
Independent	John Anderson	354	39.0	
Turnout		908	26.4	
Registered electors		3,435		
Independent gain from Conservative				
Conservative hold				

=== Tillingham ===
Tillingham
Party	Candidate	Votes	%	±%
Conservative	Richard Dewick*	283	44.3	
Independent	Matthew Neall	193	30.2	
UKIP	Peter Horscroft	155	24.3	
Majority		90	14.1	
Turnout		644	36.6	
Registered electors		1,761		
Conservative hold		Swing		

=== Tollesbury ===
Tollesbury
Party	Candidate	Votes	%	±%
Conservative	Elaine Bamford	409	68.6	
Labour	Jenna Payne	155	26.0	
Majority		254	42.6	
Turnout		596	36.8	
Registered electors		1,618		
Conservative hold		Swing		

=== Tolleshunt D'Arcy ===
Tolleshunt D'Arcy (2 seats)
Party	Candidate	Votes	%	±%
Conservative	Maddie Thompson*	749	68.7	
Conservative	Clive Morley	707	64.9	
Labour	Glenn Craig	278	25.5	
Turnout		1,089	31.8	
Registered electors		3,424		
Conservative hold				
Conservative hold				

=== Wickham Bishops & Woodham ===
Wickham Bishops & Woodham (2 seats)
Party	Candidate	Votes	%	±%
Conservative	Karl Jarvis	784	64.5	
Conservative	Mark Durham*	686	56.5	
Independent	Dawn Penn	256	21.1	
Independent	Leonard Perry	207	17.0	
Labour	Ted Herring	173	14.2	
Turnout		1,215	41.2	
Registered electors		2,949		
Conservative hold				
Conservative hold				

== Changes 2019–2023 ==
- In September–October 2020, several Conservative councillors left the party group amid internal disagreement, with deputy leader Maddie Thompson resigning from the group on 10 September 2020, citing "divisive attitudes and actions of some of the new intake of members" as incompatible with her own views. Four of the departing councillors (including Thompson) subsequently formed a breakaway 'Democratic Alliance' group. Most of those who had left the Conservative group returned to it in February 2021.

== By-elections ==
=== Heybridge East ===
The Heybridge East by-election was triggered by the resignation of councillor Bryan Harker after more than 25 years' service.

Heybridge East By-Election 6 May 2021
Party	Candidate	Votes	%	±%
Conservative	Bruce Heubner	510	49.4	−6.7
Independent	Richard Perry	202	19.6	−21.6
Labour	Wayne Frostick	123	11.9	+11.9
Independent	Alan Outlaw	111	10.7	+10.7
Liberal Democrats	John Driver	87	8.4	+8.4
Majority		308	29.8	
Turnout		1,033		
Conservative hold		Swing		

=== Tollesbury ===
The Tollesbury by-election was triggered by the resignation of former council leader Elaine Bamford as a district councillor, for personal reasons, in November 2020.

Tollesbury By-Election 6 May 2021
Party	Candidate	Votes	%	±%
Independent	Emma Stephens	531	65.4	+65.4
Conservative	Debbie Keating	224	27.6	−44.9
Labour	Matthew Wallis-Keyes	39	4.8	−22.7
Liberal Democrats	Robert Jones	18	2.2	+2.2
Majority		307	37.8	
Turnout		812		
Independent gain from Conservative		Swing		

=== Wickham Bishops and Woodham ===
The Wickham Bishops and Woodham by-election was triggered by the resignation of non-aligned independent (formerly Conservative) councillor Karl Jarvis in January 2022.

Wickham Bishops and Woodham By-Election 24 February 2022
Party	Candidate	Votes	%	±%
Conservative	Simon Morgan	361	54.0	−10.6
Independent	Lance Peatling	161	24.1	+24.1
Liberal Democrats	Colin Baldy	80	12.0	+12.0
Labour	Matthew Wallis-Keyes	66	9.9	−4.4
Majority		200	29.9	
Turnout		668		
Conservative hold		Swing		

=== Heybridge West ===
The Heybridge West by-election was triggered by the automatic disqualification of non-aligned independent councillor Chrisy Morris following a suspended prison sentence for breaching a non-molestation order.

Heybridge West By-Election 14 April 2022
Party	Candidate	Votes	%	±%
Liberal Democrats	Paula Spenceley	269	45.6	+45.6
Conservative	Nigel Miller	107	18.1	−21.5
Independent	Simon Burwood	93	15.8	+15.8
Independent	Richard Perry	72	12.2	+12.2
Labour	Matthew Wallis-Keyes	49	8.3	+8.3
Majority		162	27.5	
Turnout		590		
Liberal Democrats gain from Independent		Swing		
