= Maldon District =

- Non-metropolitan district
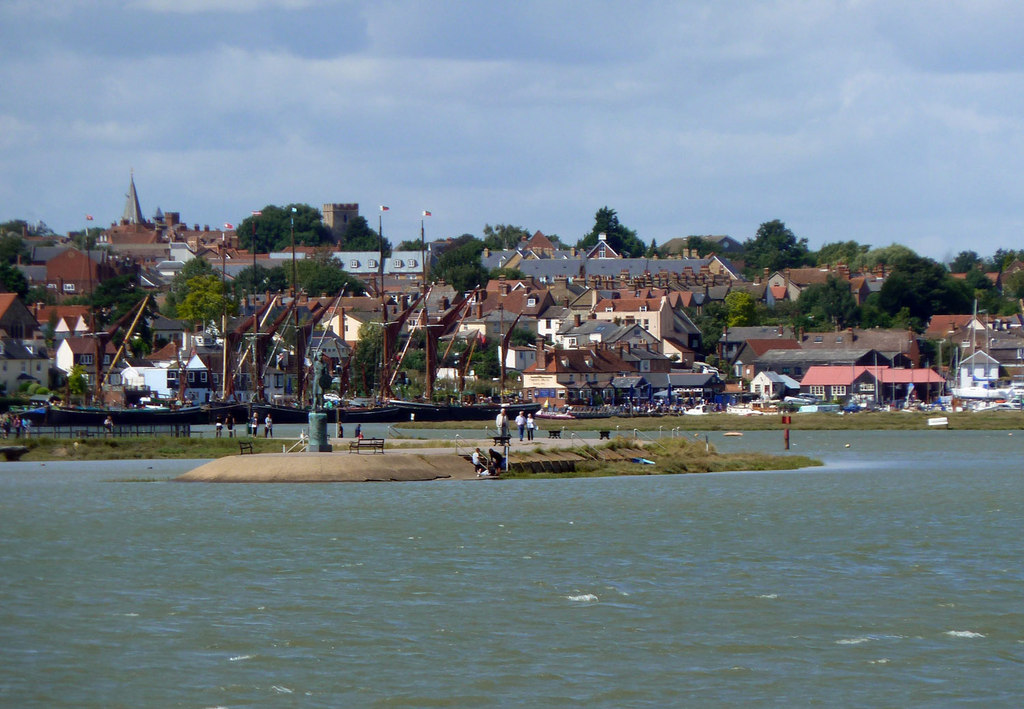
- Maldon, the administrative centre of the district

- Maldon shown within Essex
- Sovereign state: United Kingdom
- Country: England
- Region: East of England
- Non-metropolitan county: Essex
- Status: Non-metropolitan district
- Admin HQ: Maldon
- Founded: 1 April 1974

Government
  - Type: Non-metropolitan district council
  - Body: Maldon District Council
  - MPs: Priti Patel (C); John Whittingdale (C)

Area
  - Total: 138.53 sq mi (358.78 km^{2})
  - Rank: 99th (of 296)

Population (2025)
  - Total: 70,196
  - Rank: 287th (of 296)
  - Density: 506.74/sq mi (195.65/km^{2})

Ethnicity (2021)
  - Ethnic groups: List: 96.9% White; 1.4% Mixed; 1.1% Asian; 0.4% Black; 0.3% other

Religion (2021)
  - Religion: List: 49.5% Christianity; 43.4% no religion; 6.6% other; 0.5% Islam
- Time zone: UTC0 (GMT)
  - Summer (DST): UTC+1 (BST)
- ONS code: 22UK (ONS); E07000074 (GSS)
- OS grid reference: TL848070

Maldon District is a local government district in Essex, England. The district is managed by Maldon District Council, which is based in Maldon, the largest town in the district. The district also includes the town of Burnham-on-Crouch and numerous villages, including Heybridge, Wickham Bishops, Southminster, Tolleshunt D'Arcy and Tollesbury. The district covers the Dengie peninsula to the south of Maldon and the Thurstable Hundred area to the north of the Blackwater Estuary, a total area of 358.78 km^{2}.

The majority of people live in the small rural villages, many of which have their origins in connections with the coast or agricultural economy. The district has a long association with sailing, as is referenced in the council's logo.

== Administrative history ==
The district was created on 1 April 1974 under the Local Government Act 1972, covering the area of three former districts, which were all abolished at the same time:

- Burnham-on-Crouch Urban District
- Maldon Municipal Borough
- Maldon Rural District

The new district was named Maldon after its largest town.

Witham Urban District was originally planned to be in Maldon district, it was later decided to place it in Braintree district.

In March 2026, the government announced that it would abolish the district in 2028 as part of local government reform across Essex. These proposals were withdrawn in September 2026.

== Governance ==
Maldon District Council

Type
- Type: Non-metropolitan district council

Leadership
- Chair: Ron Pratt, Conservative since 14 May 2026
- Leader: Simon Morgan, Conservative since 14 May 2026
- Head of paid service: Doug Wilkinson since October 2024

Structure
- Seats: 31
- Graph of the party split among 31 seats.
- Political groups: Administration (10) Conservative (10) Other parties (21) Liberal Democrats (6) MDIG (6) Reform (2) Labour (1) Party of Women (1) Independent (5)

Elections
- Last election: 4 May 2023

Meeting place
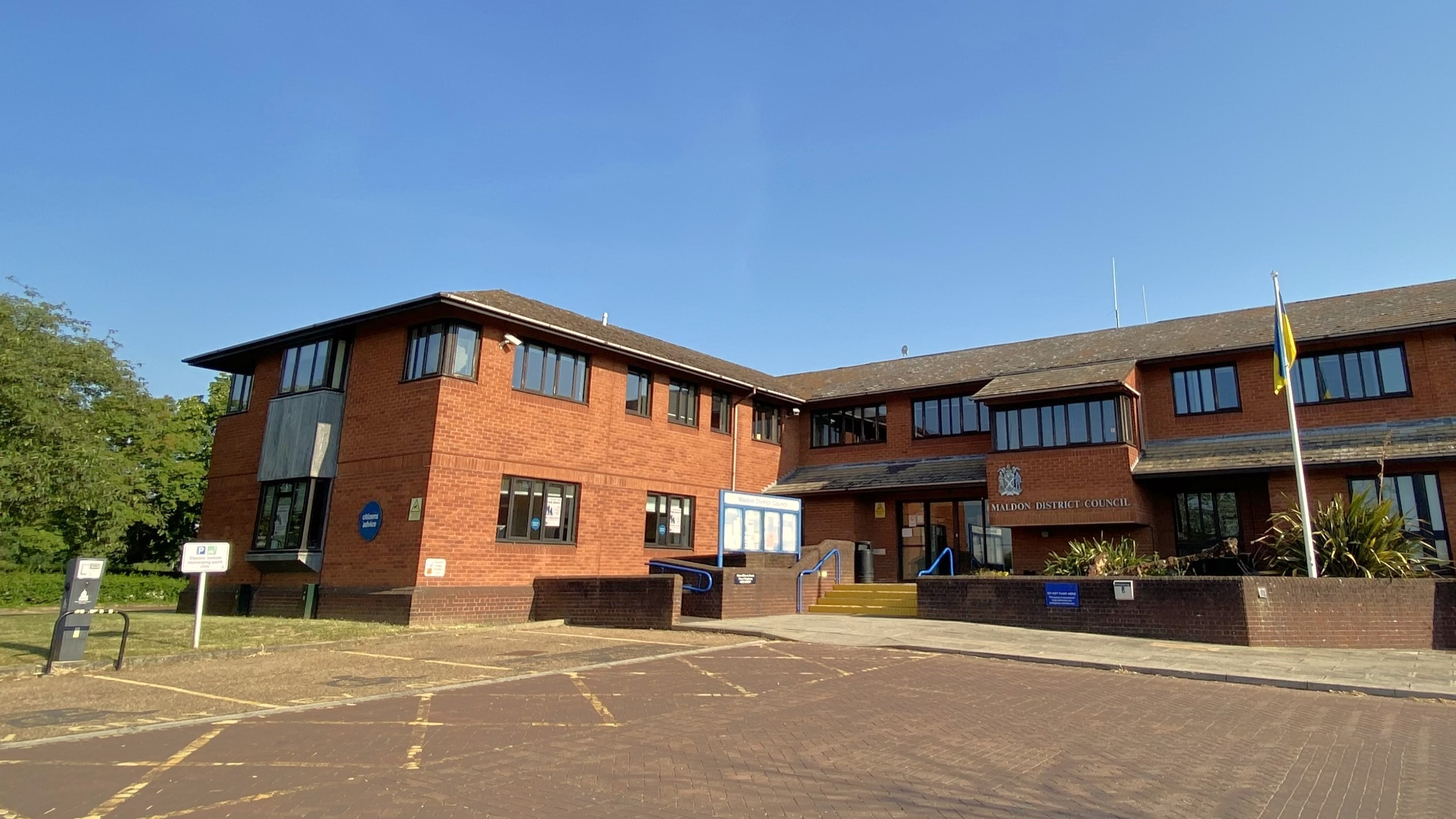
- Council Offices, Princes Road, Maldon, CM9 5DL

Website
- www.maldon.gov.uk

Maldon district is a non-metropolitan district, with Maldon District Council forming the middle layer of a three-tier structure of local government. Above the district level, Essex County Council provides county-level services. At the lower level the district is divided into civil parishes.

=== Political control ===
The council has been under no overall control since 2020. The council remained under no overall control following the 2023 election. A minority Conservative administration took over the leadership of the council with the support of some of the independent councillors in May 2026.

The first election to Maldon District Council was held in 1973, initially operating as a shadow authority alongside the outgoing authorities until the new arrangements took effect on 1 April 1974. Political control of the council since 1974 has been as follows:

| Party in control | Years |
|---|---|
| No overall control | 1974–1976 |
| Conservative | 1976–1983 |
| No overall control | 1983–1999 |
| Conservative | 1999–2020 |
| No overall control | 2020–present |

=== Leadership ===
The leaders of the council since 2008 have been:

| Councillor | Party | From | To |
|---|---|---|---|
| Alan Cheshire | Conservative | | 2008 |
| Penny Channer | Conservative | 15 May 2008 | 19 May 2011 |
| John Archer | Conservative | 19 May 2011 | May 2012 |
| Bob Boyce | Conservative | 10 May 2012 | May 2015 |
| Miriam Lewis | Conservative | 21 May 2015 | May 2017 |
| Mark Durham | Conservative | 11 May 2017 | 9 Aug 2018 |
| Adrian Fluker | Conservative | 9 Aug 2018 | 17 Aug 2020 |
| Elaine Bamford | Conservative | 1 Oct 2020 | 5 Nov 2020 |
| Wendy Stamp | Independent | 5 Nov 2020 | 11 Nov 2021 |
| Penny Channer | Conservative | 18 Jan 2022 | May 2023 |
| Richard Siddall | MDIG | 8 Jun 2023 | 14 May 2026 |
| Simon Morgan | Conservative | 14 May 2026 | |

Former leader of Maldon district council John Smith, who led the council between 1991 and 1993, was killed along with two family members while he commanded a light aircraft flight from Oban bound for Andrewsfield, Essex on 9 April 2007.

=== Composition ===
Following the 2023 election, and by-elections and changes of allegiance up to June 2026, the composition of the council was:

| Party | Councillors |
|---|---|
| Conservative | 9 |
| Liberal Democrats | 6 |
| Maldon District Independent Group | 6 |
| Reform | 2 |
| Labour | 1 |
| Party of Women | 1 |
| Independent | 6 |
| Total | 31 |

Four of the independent councillors sit together as the "District Support Group".

=== Premises ===
The council is based at the Council Offices on Princes Road in Maldon. The original building was previously an orphanage called "The Retreat", which had been purchased in 1939 by the Maldon Rural District Council for £4,500. Large extensions were added in the 1980s to the north and south of the original building.

== Elections ==
Since the last boundary changes in 2003, the council has comprised 31 councillors elected from 17 wards. Elections are held every four years.

The area is part of the parliamentary constituency of Maldon.

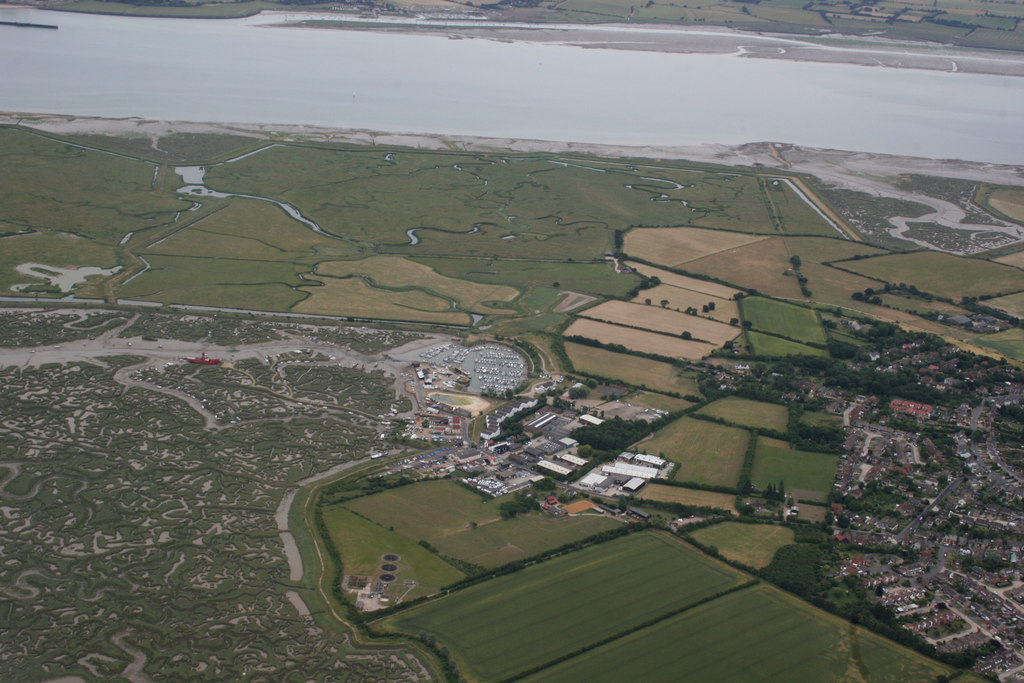
Tollesbury, one of the many villages in the district

== History ==
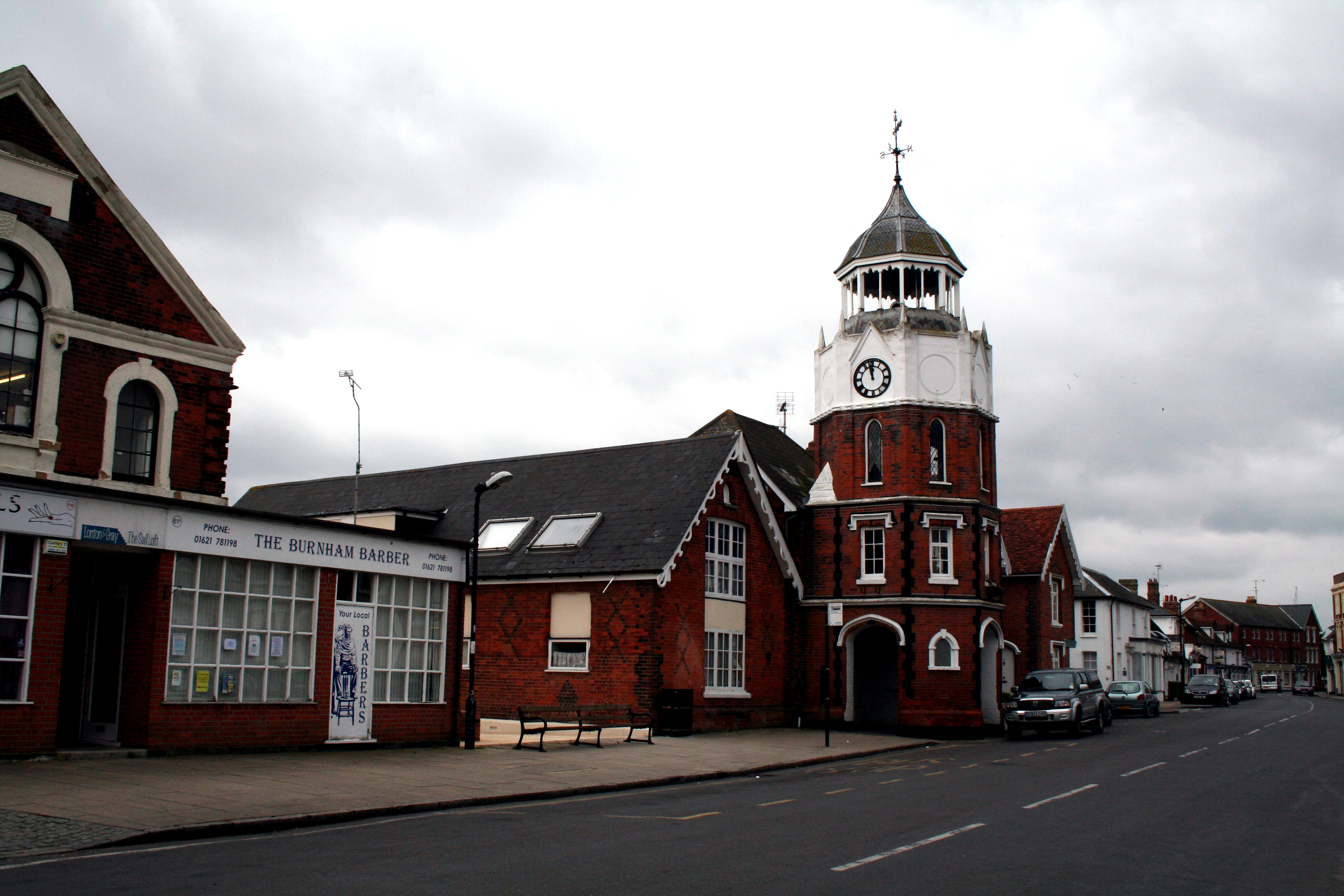
Burnham-on-Crouch, the district's second largest town.

The first evidence of a settlement to the north of Maldon at Elms Farm is from the Middle Bronze Age 3500 years ago. From 500 BC onwards the red hills of the Crouch and Blackwater show us that there was a continuous and extensive activity in the salt making which still prospers today.

Later, during the Iron Age, about 100 BC, there was a port, set among the marshlands at the junction of the Blackwater and Chelmer rivers. This settlement may have been of regional religious significance, and there is evidence that it traded luxury goods with Europe.

Elms Farm continued as a port and market place but was clearly superseded in importance by Colchester in the 1st century AD, when Colchester became the first capital of the Roman administration.

The Romans founded Othona in the 3rd century. It was a Saxon Shore fort at the mouth of the Blackwater, built to protect the estuary from Saxon pirates. It was here in 654 AD that St Cedd founded the church of St Peter-on-the-Wall, the oldest church in England to retain much of its original fabric.

In 664 AD St Cedd attended the Synod of Whitby which merged the Anglo-Celtic Church with the Church of Rome. Recent changes in the coastline have revealed the remains of extensive Saxon 5-7th century fish traps. The Church stands today overlooking the North Sea from whence came further invaders in the 10th century - the Danes.

In 912 AD and 914 AD King Edward the Elder camped at Maldon to organise defences in the desperate fight against the Danes. In 917 AD the Saxons were defeated at Colchester and besieged at Maldon, but eventually, the Danes were defeated.

In 991 AD there was a major battle between the pillaging Danes led by Olaf Trygvassen who had already attacked Ipswich, and Earl Byrhtnoth’s men who were defending Maldon on the instruction of the Saxon King Æthelred the Unready. Earl Byrhtnoth was in his sixties. The battle was recorded in a poem which is regarded as one of the finest examples of early English literature.

The famous Battle of Maldon took place beside the River Blackwater on 10 August 991, during the reign of Æthelred the Unready. The Anglo-Saxons, led by Byrhtnoth and his thegns, fought against a Viking invasion, a battle which ended in defeat for the Anglo-Saxons.

== Geology, landscape and ecology ==
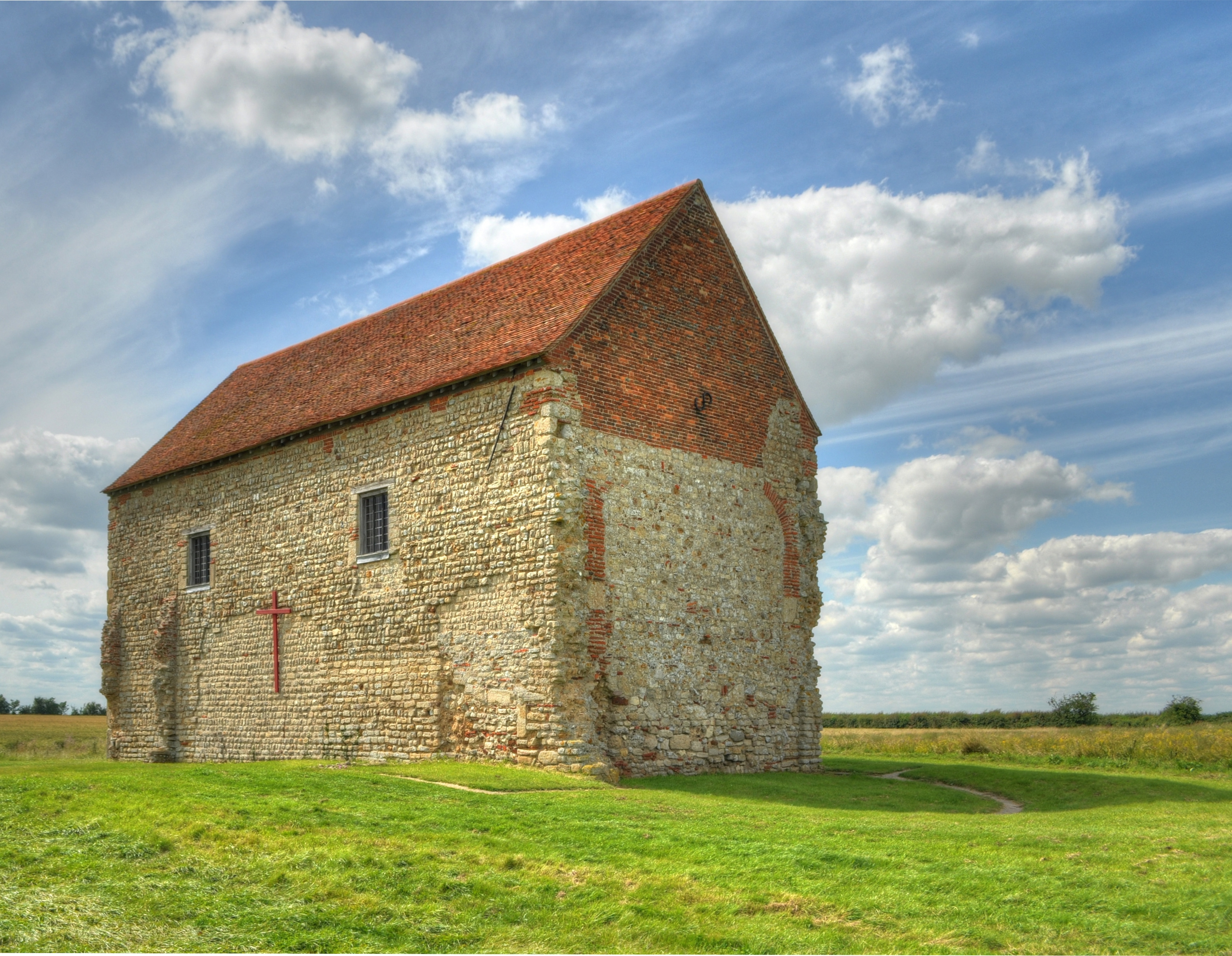
St Peters Chapel, Bradwell, against the big skies for which Essex is famous. The chapel was established by St Cedd, the patron saint of Essex around 662, amid the district's extensive coastal marshes.

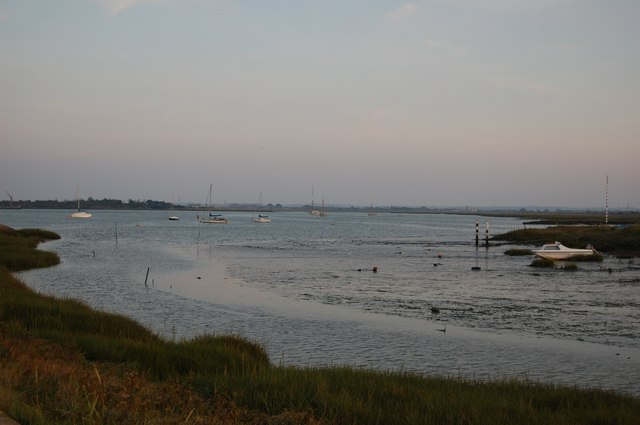
The Blackwater Esturary

The district is in the east of Essex (51°41′N 0°45′E). Most of the district is the Dengie peninsula. Still, a significant area is also the area above the Blackwater Estuary, bounded by the River Blackwater to the west until near Kelvedon, the boundary then continues south of Tiptree to the Salcott inlet on the Blackwater Estuary. There are very few settlements on the boundary of the district with the North Sea, in contrast with other coastal districts of Essex, due to the Dengie Marshes.

The district has a rural character ranging from the tidal salt marshes to farmland and rolling wooded ridges. A network of country lanes provides access to the countryside from the towns and villages. A remote area of tidal mud-flats and saltmarshes at the eastern end of the Dengie peninsula forms the Dengie Special Protection Area. The River Blackwater and River Crouch are of international importance for nature conservation particularly for their extensive population of wildfowl and waders.

== Parishes ==
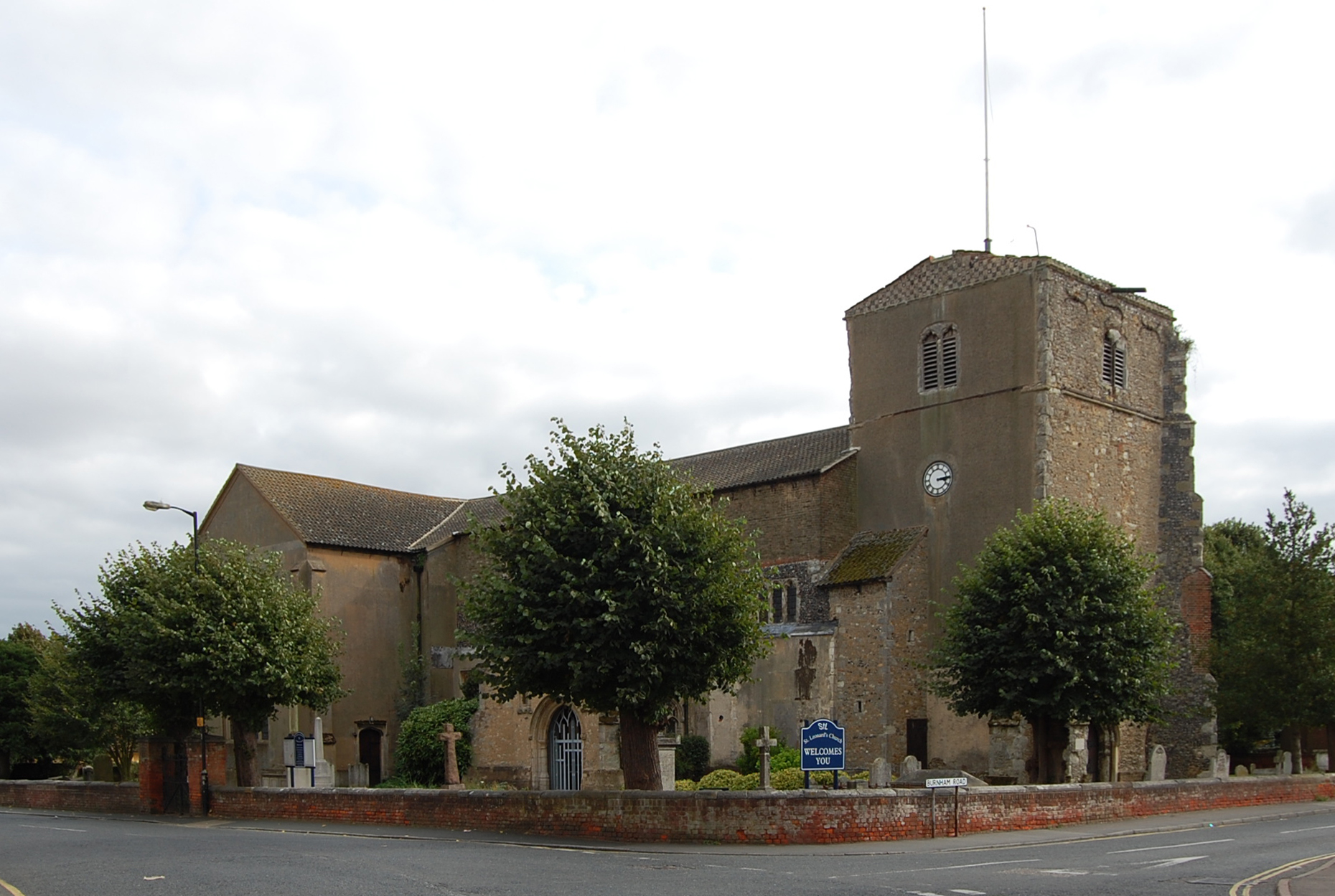
Southminster, the district's third largest settlement.

The district is divided into 34 civil parishes. In Burnham-on-Crouch and Maldon, the parish councils operate under the name "Town Council". In addition, some of the parishes share a grouped parish council, meaning there are just 31 parish councils. The current parishes are:

- Althorne
- Asheldham (Note: Shares grouped parish council with Dengie)
- Bradwell-on-Sea
- Burnham-on-Crouch (Town)
- Cold Norton
- Dengie (Note: Shares grouped parish council with Asheldham)
- Goldhanger
- Great Braxted
- Great Totham
- Hazeleigh (Note: Shares grouped parish council with Woodham Mortimer)
- Heybridge
- Heybridge Basin
- Langford (Note: Shares grouped parish council with Ulting)
- Latchingdon
- Little Braxted
- Little Totham
- Maldon (Town)
- Mayland
- Mundon
- North Fambridge
- Purleigh
- St Lawrence
- Southminster
- Steeple
- Stow Maries
- Tillingham
- Tollesbury
- Tolleshunt D'Arcy
- Tolleshunt Knights
- Tolleshunt Major
- Ulting (Note: Shares grouped parish council with Langford)
- Wickham Bishops
- Woodham Mortimer (Note: Shares grouped parish council with Hazeleigh)
- Woodham Walter

== Arms ==
Coat of arms of Maldon District
| Notes Granted 28 February 1978. Crest On a wreath Or and Vert upon water barry wavy Argent and Azure charged with a fleur-de-lys Or an Essex sailing barge Proper. Escutcheon Per saltire wavy Azure and Vert a saltire wavy Argent between a lion passant guardant in chief two garbs in fess and a ship's wheel in base all Gold. Supporters On the dexter side an Anglo-Saxon warrior holding in his dexter hand a sword point downwards and the sinister side a yachtsman habited in a sailing smock and wearing a peaked cap all Proper upon a compartment composed of a grassy mound also Proper divided by water barry wavy Argent and Azure. Motto Vision Courage Integrity Badge Upon water barry wavy Argent and Azure charged with a fleur-de-lys Or an Essex sailing barge Proper. |
