= Maldon Rural District =

Former rural district in Essex, England

Coordinates: 51.664°N 0.770°E

Maldon
- Rural district
- Area
  - 1971: 31,770 hectares (78,505 acres)
- Population
  - 1901: 14,633
  - 1971: 22,026
- History
  - Created: 28 December 1894
  - Abolished: 31 March 1974
  - Succeeded by: Maldon District
- Status: Rural district
  - HQ: Maldon

Maldon Rural District was a rural district in Essex, England, from 1894 to 1974. It covered a group of rural parishes around the town of Maldon, where the council was based, but did not include the town itself. It was abolished in 1974 to become part of the new Maldon District.

== History ==
The district had its origins in the Maldon Poor Law Union, which had been created in 1835 for a group of parishes to collectively deliver their responsibilities under the poor laws. The union initially used the existing Maldon town workhouse on Market Hill, later replacing it with a new workhouse on Spital Road, which was completed in 1873.

In 1872, sanitary districts were established. In rural areas, public health and local government responsibilities were given to the existing boards of guardians of poor law unions. The Maldon board of guardians therefore took on these responsibilities for the rural sanitary district, which covered the same area as the poor law union with the exception of the borough of Maldon itself, which formed its own urban sanitary district. Rural sanitary districts were reconstituted as rural districts with their own elected councils with effect from 28 December 1894, under the Local Government Act 1894. The link with the poor law union continued in that all the rural district councillors were thereafter ex officio members of the board of guardians. Maldon Rural District Council held its first official meeting on 8 January 1895 at the workhouse. Oliver Belsham, a merchant from Heybridge, was appointed the first chairman of the council; he held the role until 1910.

In its early years, the rural district council met at the workhouse in Maldon, with its staff being based in various offices. In 1939 the council bought a former orphanage called "The Retreat" on Princes Road in Maldon for £4,500 and converted it into its offices and meeting place. The workhouse later became St Peter's Hospital in 1948.

Burnham-on-Crouch was removed from the rural district in 1898 to become its own urban district. Creeksea and Heybridge were removed from the district in 1934, when Creeksea was absorbed into Burnham-on-Crouch Urban District, and Heybridge was absorbed into the borough of Maldon.

The rural district was abolished in 1974. The area became part of the new non-metropolitan district of Maldon.

== Parishes ==
The civil parishes in Maldon Rural District were:

- Althorne
- Asheldham
- Bradwell-on-Sea
- Burnham-on-Crouch (until 1898)
- Cold Norton
- Creeksea (until 1934)
- Dengie
- Goldhanger
- Great Braxted
- Great Totham
- Hazeleigh
- Heybridge (until 1934)
- Langford
- Latchingdon
- Little Braxted
- Little Totham
- Mayland
- Mundon
- North Fambridge
- Purleigh
- St Lawrence
- Southminster
- Steeple
- Stow Maries
- Tillingham
- Tollesbury
- Tolleshunt D'Arcy
- Tolleshunt Knights
- Tolleshunt Major
- Ulting
- Wickham Bishops
- Woodham Mortimer
- Woodham Walter
