= Asheldham Brook =

River in Essex, England

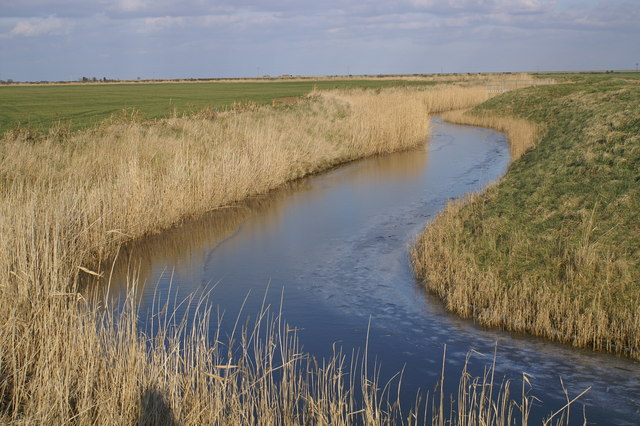
- Asheldham Brook flowing through the Dengie marshes, looking downstream (NE)

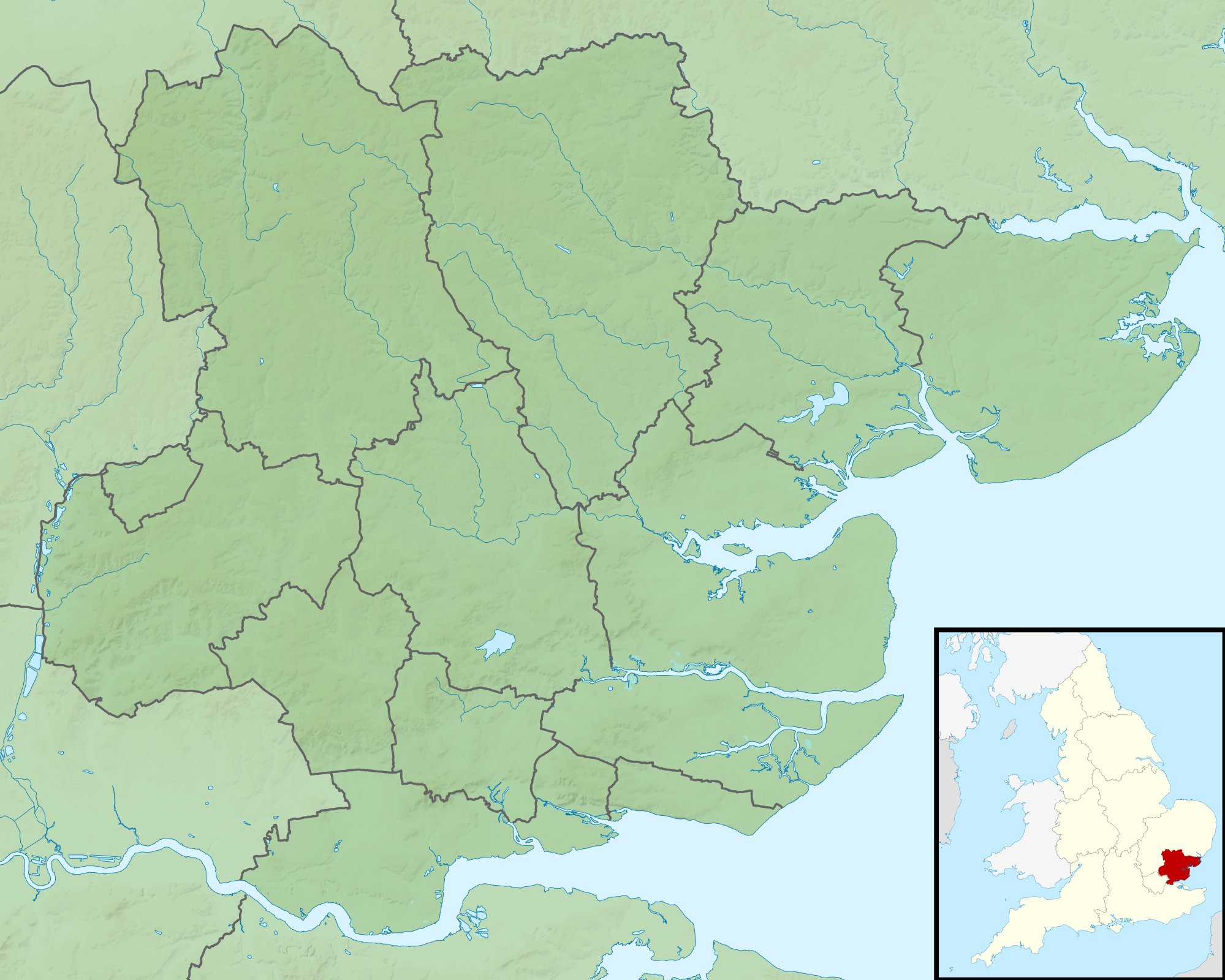
- Location of the outfall within Essex

Location
- Country: United Kingdom
- County: Essex
- Parishes: St Lawrence, Southminster, Asheldham, Dengie, Tillingham

Physical characteristics
- Source: Asheldham Brook
  - location: near Batts Road, St Lawrence, Maldon, Essex, England
  - coordinates: 51°41′14″N 0°49′10″E
- 2nd source: Two other brooks
  - location: near B1018/B1021 roundabout, Southminster and near Steeple Road, Southminster, Maldon, Essex, England
- Mouth: North Sea
  - location: Grange Outfall, Dengie marshes
  - coordinates: 51°40′45″N 0°55′53″E

Basin features
- Tributaries
  - left: Some small streams
  - right: Two other brooks and some small streams

Asheldham Brook is a river that flows entirely through the Maldon district in Essex, United Kingdom. It has its main source near Batts Road in the St Lawrence parish, and its mouth at Grange Outfall on the Dengie marshes, flowing out into the North Sea.

== Route ==
There are at least three actual sources for the brook. The primary source is located near the village of St. Lawrence. From here, the brook flows south-east before meeting another brook (which is a confluence between the two other sources) at a confluence just outside the village of Asheldham. From here, the brook flows just south of the village, and continues east through the Dengie marshes. Eventually, the river meets the Dengie sea wall at Grange Outfall. Here it passes through into the sands off the Dengie coast and out into the North Sea.

== Uses ==
The brook is one of the main drainage systems for the Dengie peninsula. The River Blackwater to the north of the peninsula and the River Crouch to the south of the peninsula also help drain it, with the Asheldham Brook flowing through the middle. Asheldham Brook is also used for irrigation for the fields in the marshes.

== Gallery ==
In order from furthest upstream to furthest downstream:

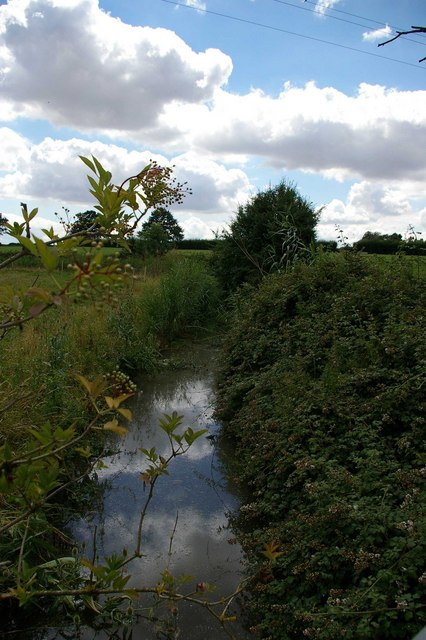
The brook just east of Asheldham.

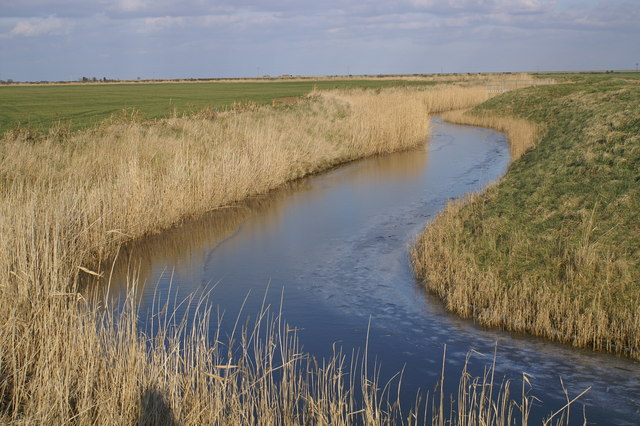
The brook passing through the Dengie marshes (looking downstream (E)).

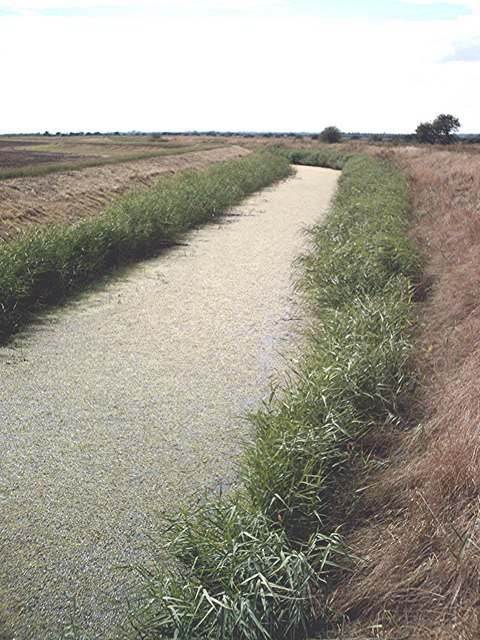
Looking upstream from the Bridgewick Road bridge.

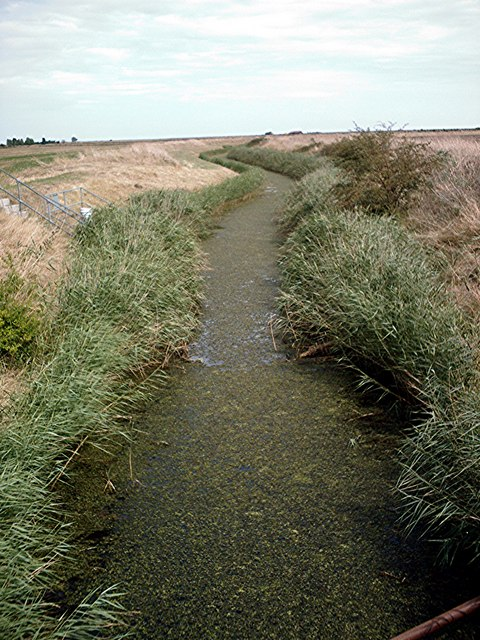
The brook as seen from Bridgewick Road bridge in the marshes.

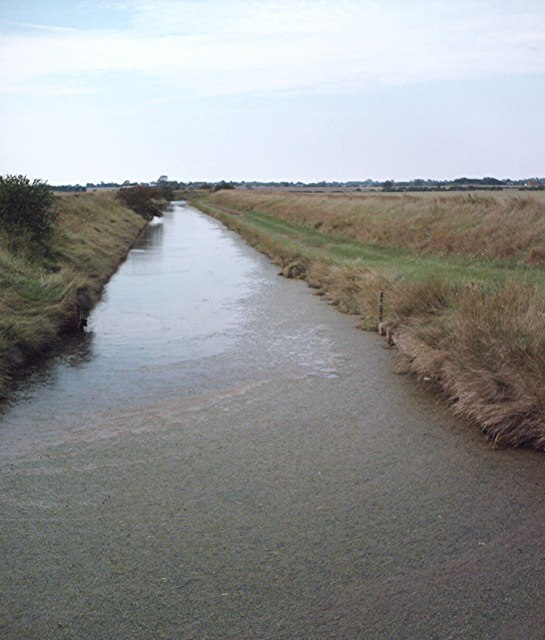
The brook as seen from Grange Outfall (looking upstream (W)).

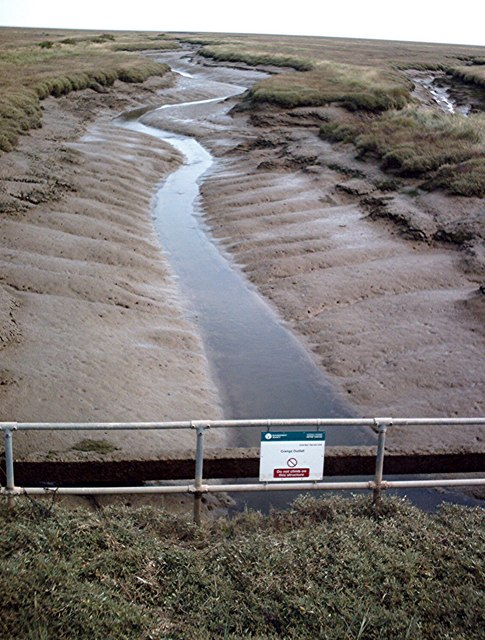
Grange Outfall, (looking downstream (E)) where the brook flows out into the North Sea.

== See also ==
- Asheldham
- Dengie peninsula
