= St Lawrence, Essex =

Civil parish in Essex, England

Coordinates: 51.6987°N 0.8446°E

St Lawrence
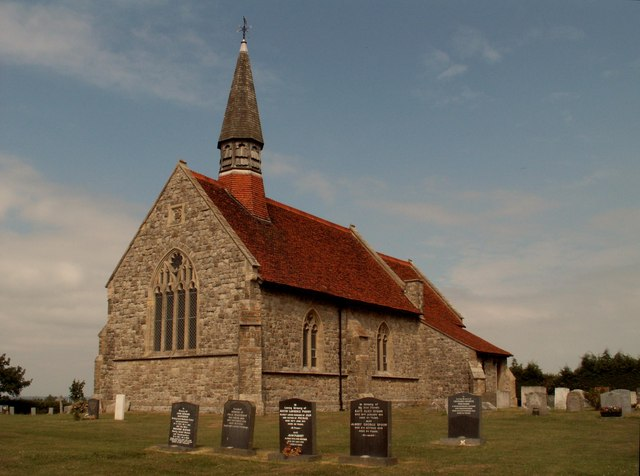
- Church of St Lawrence

- Location within Essex
- Population: 1,437 (Parish, 2021)
- OS grid reference: TL966041
- District: Maldon
- Shire county: Essex
- Region: East
- Country: England
- Sovereign state: United Kingdom
- Post town: SOUTHMINSTER
- Postcode district: CM0
- Dialling code: 01621
- Police: Essex
- Fire: Essex
- Ambulance: East of England
- UK Parliament: Maldon and East Chelmsford

St Lawrence is a parish in the Maldon district of Essex in the East of England on the Dengie peninsula. The village of St Lawrence Bay, which takes its name from the parish, is situated on the south shore of the Blackwater Estuary, 4 miles (6.5 km) from Southminster and is also known by local residents as “Stone”. The village contains areas known as Ramsey Island and St Lawrence Bay. At the 2021 census the parish had a population of 1,437.

The village has a single access road leading down to the estuary shore and has seen recent expansion and the construction of new housing due to its riverside location and proximity to Southminster railway station, which provides a fast commuter service to Liverpool Street Station in the City of London. Also with bus links via the D1 allowing for access to Bradwell-on-sea and Maldon where other bus links are available.

There are a small number of businesses in the village including two pubs called “The Stone” and "St Lawrence Inn" and a single shop which also provides Post Office services. In the summer the population of the area swells due to tourism, with the presence of Waterside Holiday Park, which holds many open days for local residents and its visitors, plus with many second homes the area becomes a retreat for many. The Blackwater Estuary also provides a good location for water sports and there are two clubs which provide facilities on the waterfront; Stone Watersports Club and Stone Sailing Club. In 2012 St Lawrence opened a village hall which hosts various social clubs.

The area also has many more outdoor pursuits from rambling to triathlons and road cycling.

The village is protected from flooding by a sea wall which was reinforced in the 1990s due to increased flood risk in the east of England. This provides a footpath along the south bank of the estuary with good views of the surrounding countryside. Also located at intervals along the sea wall are Type 2 pillboxes that were built to defend the estuary during the Second World War.

== Nearest places ==
- Steeple
- Tillingham
- Dengie
- Southminster
- Bradwell-on-Sea
- Burnham-on-Crouch
- Maylandsea
- Althorne
