= Bradwell Waterside =

Hamlet in Essex, England

Coordinates: 51.733794°N 0.889883°E

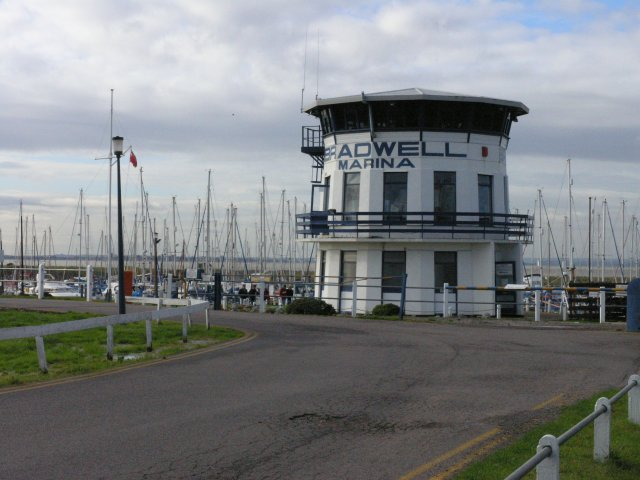
- Bradwell Marina

- Location within Essex
- OS grid reference: TL996078
- Civil parish: Bradwell-on-Sea
- District: Maldon
- Shire county: Essex
- Region: East
- Country: England
- Sovereign state: United Kingdom
- Post town: SOUTHMINSTER
- Postcode district: CM0
- Dialling code: 01621
- Police: Essex
- Fire: Essex
- Ambulance: East of England
- UK Parliament: Maldon

Bradwell Waterside is a small hamlet in Essex, England. It is located about 9 km (5.6 mi) north-northeast of Southminster and is 28 km (17 mi) east from the county town of Chelmsford. The hamlet is in the district of Maldon and the parliamentary constituency of Maldon. The population of the hamlet is included in the civil parish of Bradwell-on-Sea.

It has a marina and is about a mile north-northwest of Bradwell-on-Sea on the Blackwater Estuary on the northern edge of the Dengie peninsula.

The hamlet sits at the end of the B1021, the main road through the north of the Dengie peninsula to Latchingdon, and on the coast of Bradwell Creek, a channel next to the Blackwater.

Nearby, there is the former Royal Air Force base RAF Bradwell Bay, owing to the flat land of the Dengie. Today the base is farmland. Additionally, there is the former nuclear power plant, Bradwell Power Station, a significant local and navigational landmark. The buildings themselves still stand post-decommissioning, and so does the water intake in the Blackwater. A beach runs along the north-east edge of the Dengie here, from Bradwell Waterside to the Dengie Marshes at Saint Peter's chapel.

There are two pubs in Bradwell, The Green Man in the hamlet and the Marina Bar at Bradwell Marina.

== See also ==
- Pewet Island
