= Bradwell Shell Bank =

Nature reserve in Essex, England

Coordinates: 51.735°N 0.946°E

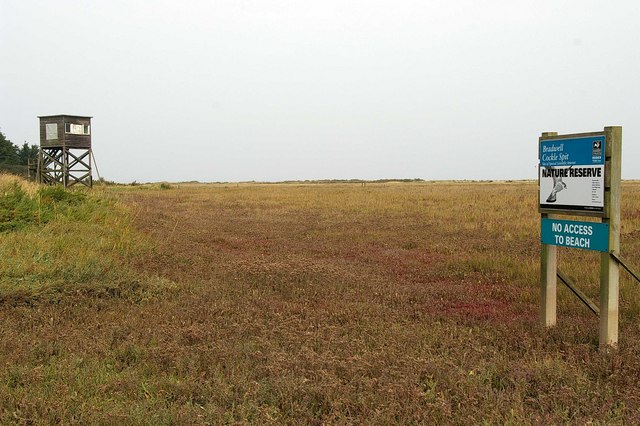
- Interactive map of Bradwell Shell Bank
- Type: Nature reserve
- Location: Bradwell-on-Sea, Essex
- OS grid: TM 035 081
- Area: N/Av
- Manager: Essex Wildlife Trust

Bradwell Shell Bank is a nature reserve on the coast of the Dengie Peninsula near Bradwell-on-Sea in Essex. It is managed by the Essex Wildlife Trust. It is part of the Dengie Site of Special Scientific Interest, Special Protection Area and Ramsar site, and the Essex Estuaries Special Area of Conservation. It is also part of the Blackwater Flats and Marshes, a Grade I site in the Nature Conservation Review.

The site is a large area of saltmarsh together with some 12 hectares (30 acres) of shell bank. Birds which breed on the shell bank include little terns and ringed plovers, and there many species on the saltmarsh. There are flora such as yellow-horned poppies, grass-leaved oraches and rock samphires.

Part of the reserve is accessible at low tide by a footpath from the Chapel of St Peter-on-the-Wall.
