= List of shipwrecks in October 1851 =

The list of shipwrecks in October 1851 includes ships sunk, foundered, wrecked, grounded, or otherwise lost during October 1851.

== 1 October ==
List of shipwrecks: 1 October 1851
Ship	State	Description
Foam	(United Kingdom of Great Britain and Ireland) Cape Colony	The schooner was wrecked at East London. Her crew were rescued.
Mercedita	Spain	The polacca brig was wrecked on the Corga Grande, off the coast of Brazil. She was on a voyage from Maranhão, Brazil to Havana, Cuba.
Union	United Kingdom	The brig was abandoned in the Dogger Bank. Her crew were rescued.
Vixen	Sweden	The ship was driven ashore on Bornholm, Denmark. She was on a voyage from Danzig to London, United Kingdom.
William	United Kingdom	The brig was driven ashore at Carston Point, County Antrim. She was on a voyage from Dublin to Memell, Prussia. She was refloated and resumed her voyage.

== 2 October ==
List of shipwrecks: 2 October 1851
Ship	State	Description
Gardina	Lübeck	The ship was driven ashore 9 nautical miles (17 km) east of Stolpmünde. She was on a voyage from Lübeck to Stettin.
Harewood	United Kingdom	The ship was driven ashore at the Mumbles, Glamorgan.
Mary	United Kingdom	The ship was driven ashore and severely damaged at New Romney, Kent.
Mozelle	United Kingdom	The ship was abandoned in the Atlantic Ocean 100 nautical miles (190 km) north of Faial Island, Azores. Her crew were rescued. She was on a voyage from Demerara, British Guiana to Saltcoats, Ayrshire.
Perlin	Norway	The brig was driven ashore near Freshwater, Isle of Wight, United Kingdom. Her crew were rescued by the Coast Guard using rocket apparatus.
Rothesay Castle	United Kingdom	The paddle steamer was driven against the quayside and severely damaged at Newhaven, Sussex. She was on a voyage from Dieppe, Seine-Inférieure to Newhaven.
Venus	United Kingdom	The ship was driven ashore at New Romney.
Vigie	France	The brig was driven ashore at the Mumbles. She was on a voyage from Port Talbot, Glamorgan to Bordeaux, Gironde.
William Duke	United Kingdom	The ship ran aground and was damaged at Waterford. She was on a voyage from Jaffa, Ottoman Syria to Queenstown, County Cork. She was refloated and taken in to Passage West, County Cork in a leaky condition.

== 3 October ==
List of shipwrecks: October 1851
Ship	State	Description
Flirt	United States	The fishing schooner sank at anchor in Bay of St. Lawrence, during a terrible gale. Lost with all 14 hands.
Indiana	Flag unknown	The brig was wrecked on Gotska Sandön, Sweden. Her crew were rescued.
Mountaineer	(United Kingdom of Great Britain and Ireland) British North America	The ship was abandoned in the Atlantic Ocean. Her crew were rescued by James Pannell (United Kingdom).
Quebec	United Kingdom	The ship was abandoned in the Atlantic Ocean. Her crew were rescued. She was on a voyage from Ibrail, Ottoman Empire to Queenstown, County Cork.
Royal Saxon	United Kingdom	The ship was driven ashore in Table Bay near "Riet Vley", Cape Colony. She was on a voyage from London to Cape Town, Cape Colony.

== 4 October ==
List of shipwrecks: 4 October 1851
Ship	State	Description
Ellen	United Kingdom	The sloop was driven ashore at Le Touquet, Pas-de-Calais, France. All on board were rescued. She was on a voyage from Marseille, Bouches-du-Rhône, France to London. Ellen was refloated on 12 October and taken in to Étaples, Pas-de-Calais.
Forfarshire	United Kingdom	The ship ran aground a sunken rock in the Gaspar Strait. She was on a voyage from Canton, China to London. She was refloated and resumed her voyage.
Planet	United Kingdom	The ship was wrecked on the coast of Labrador, British North America.
Tre Brodre	Sweden	The ship was wrecked off Sandhammaren. She was on a voyage from Carlshamn to Ystad and Gothenburg.

== 5 October ==
List of shipwrecks: 5 October 1851
Ship	State	Description
Cazone	United States	The barque was wrecked on Taylor's Bank, in Liverpool Bay. Her crew were rescued by the Liverpool and Magazines Lifeboats. She was on a voyage from City Point, Virginia to Liverpool, Lancashire, United Kingdom.
Fox	United Kingdom	The ship ran aground at Goole, Yorkshire. She was on a voyage from Goole to Perth. She was refloated and put back to Goole.
Jane	United Kingdom	The ship ran aground on the Hayle Sandbank, in the North Sea off the coast of Suffolk. She was on a voyage from London to North Shields, County Durham. She was refloated and resumed her voyage.
Joven Emilia	Spain	The schooner was captured by Moorish pirates west of Cape Tres Forcas, Morocco. She was plundered and destroyed.
Mary	United Kingdom	The barque was wrecked at Cable Head, Prince Edward Island, British North America. Her crew were rescued. She was on a voyage from Florida, United States to Richibucto, New Brunswick, British North America.
Ruby	United Kingdom	The ship ran aground on the Newcombe Sand, in the North Sea off the coast of Suffolk. She was on a voyage from South Shields, County Durham to Dordrecht, South Holland, Netherlands. Shew as refloated the next day and taken in to Lowestoft, Suffolk.
Samuel Hayman	United Kingdom	The ship ran aground at the Mumbles, Glamorgan. She was on a voyage from Swansea, Glamorgan to London.
Violet	United Kingdom	The brig was captured by Moorish pirates west of Cape Tres Forcas with the loss of a crew member. She was plundered and destroyed. Her surviving crew were taken prisoner and held to ransom. Violet was on a voyage from Galaţi, Ottoman Empire to Falmouth, Cornwall of Queenstown, County Cork.
William	United Kingdom	The ship was driven ashore at Strangford, County Antrim. She was on a voyage from Dublin to Memel, Prussia.

== 6 October ==
List of shipwrecks: 6 October 1851
Ship	State	Description
Anne	United Kingdom	The ship was driven ashore and wrecked at Ballinskelligs, County Kerry. Her crew were rescued. She was on a voyage from Queenstown, County Cork to Tralee, County Kerry.
Augustus	United Kingdom	The brig was abandoned in the Dogger Bank. Her crew were rescued by the brig Echo (Norway). Augustus was on a voyage from South Shields, County Durham to Hamburg.
Freden	(Russian Empire) Grand Duchy of Finland	The ship ran aground south off Læsø, Denmark. She was on a voyage from London, United Kingdom to Pori. She had become a wreck by 24 October.
General Castilla	Spain	The ship sank off Pisco, Peru with the loss of a crew member. She was on a voyage from Pisco to Islay, Inner Hebrides, United Kingdom.
Magdalena	Bremen	The ship was wrecked on the Bergrief, in the Baltic Sea. She was on a voyage from Bremen to Saint Petersburg, Russia. She was refloated and was towed in to Varberg, Sweden.
Minerva	Russia	The barque was driven ashore at Richibucto, New Brunswick, British North America. She was consequently condemned.
Pegasus	Hamburg	The ship foundered on Horns Rev on the way to Hamburg. Crew of 9 made it in a boat to the Jutland coast.
Petite Emma	France	The ship ran aground off Le Tréport, Seine-Inférieure with the loss of three of her crew. She was on a voyage from Marseille, Bouches-du-Rhône to Saint-Valery-sur-Somme, Somme.
Princess Victoria	United Kingdom	The ship was driven ashore at Richibucto.

== 7 October ==
List of shipwrecks: 7 October 1851
Ship	State	Description
Amity	United Kingdom	The ship sank in the North Sea. Her crew were rescued by Annechina (Netherlands). Amity was on a voyage from Arkhangelsk, Russia to an English port.
Anne	United Kingdom	The ship was wrecked at Ballinskelligs, County Kerry. Her crew were rescued. She was on a voyage from Queenstown, County Cork to Tralee, County Kerry.
Augusta	United Kingdom	The ship was driven ashore north of Algeciras, Spain. She was on a voyage from Málaga, Spain to London. She was refloated and resumed her voyage.
Eliza and Jane	United Kingdom	The ship ran aground on the Newcombe Sand, in the North Sea off the coast of Suffolk. She was on a voyage from Sunderland, County Durham to Ipswich, Suffolk. She was refloated.
Isabella	United Kingdom	The smack was driven ashore and wrecked at Tobermory, Isle of Mull, Inner Hebrides. SHer crew were rescued. She was on a voyage from Belfast, County Antrim to Wick, Caithness.
Perseverant	Belgium	The ship departed from "Roposs" for Goeree, Zeeland, Netherlands. She was subsequently wrecked.
Rance	France	The ship was driven ashore and capsized at Granville, Manche. Her crew were rescued.
Ruby	United Kingdom	The ship ran aground on the Newcombe Sand. She was on a voyage from South Shields, County Durham to Dordrecht, South Holland, Netherlands. She was refloated and taken in to Lowestoft, Suffolk in a leaky condition.
Union	(United Kingdom of Great Britain and Ireland) British North America	The schooner was driven ashore at Brackley Point, Prince Edward Island. Her crew were rescued.

== 8 October ==
List of shipwrecks: 8 October 1851
Ship	State	Description
Avenir	United Kingdom	The ship was wrecked on the Longsand, in the North Sea off the coast of Essex.
Chartley Castle	United Kingdom	The barque was wrecked in Table Bay.
Francisco Xavier	Spain	The ship was driven ashore and wrecked on North Ronaldsay, Orkney Islands, United Kingdom. Her crew were rescued.
Gertruida Johanna	Netherlands	The ship was driven ashore at Zandvoort, North Holland. She was on a voyage from London, United Kingdom to Rotterdam, South Holland. She was refloated on 13 November and taken in to Texel, North Holland.
John Fox	United Kingdom	The ship ran aground off Kastrup, Denmark. She was on a voyage from Stettin to London. She was refloated and resumed her voyage.
John Stagg	United Kingdom	The ship was abandoned in the North Sea. Her crew were rescued. She was on a voyage from Hartlepool, County Durham to Hamburg.
Thetis	United Kingdom	The ship was driven ashore near Angle, Pembrokeshire. She was on a voyage from Falmouth, Cornwall to Cardiff, Glamorgan. She was refloated on 17 October.
Triad	United Kingdom	The ship was wrecked in the Paracel Islands. Her crew were rescued by Ino (United States). Triad was on a voyage from China to Bombay, India.

== 9 October ==
List of shipwrecks: 9 October 1851
Ship	State	Description
Charley Castle	United Kingdom	The barque was driven ashore and wrecked in Table Bay.
Indus	United Kingdom	The brig was destroyed by fire in the Atlantic Ocean (40°02′N 73°47′W). Her crew were rescued. She was on a voyage from New York, United States to Saint Domingo.
Mary Young	United Kingdom	The ship was driven ashore on Læsø, Denmark. She was on a voyage from Saint Petersburg, Russia to London.
Morayshire	United Kingdom	The ship was driven ashore in Table Bay. She was on a voyage from Moulmein, Burma to London. She was refloated on 21 October and taken in to Cape Town, Cape Colony.

== 10 October ==
List of shipwrecks: 10 October 1851
Ship	State	Description
Acme	United Kingdom	The ship ran aground on the Flower Ledge, in the Strait of Belle Isle. She was on a voyage from Quebec City, Province of Canada, British North America to Liverpool, Lancashire. She was refloated and resumed her voyage.
Hilda	United Kingdom	The ship was driven ashore at Dragør, Denmark. She was on a voyage from Hull, Yorkshire to Saint Petersburg, Russia. She was refloated the next day and resumed her voyage.
Margaret	United Kingdom	The sloop was driven ashore and wrecked at "Langwell". Her crew were rescued. She was on a voyage from Inverness to Reiss, Caithness.
Zitella	United Kingdom	The ship was driven ashore at Helsingør, Denmark. She was on a voyage from Hull to Saint Petersburg. She was refloated the next day and resumed her voyage.

== 11 October ==
List of shipwrecks: 11 October 1851
Ship	State	Description
New Concord	United Kingdom	The brig foundered in the North Sea. Her crew were rescued. She was on a voyage from Newcastle upon Tyne, Northumberland to Amsterdam, North Holland, Netherlands.

== 12 October ==
List of shipwrecks: 12 October 1851
Ship	State	Description
Daniel P. King	United States	The fishing schooner was lost at Cape Breton. Crew saved.
Jane	(United Kingdom of Great Britain and Ireland) British North America	The ship was driven ashore and wrecked at Yarmouth, Nova Scotia. Her crew were rescued. She was on a voyage from Boston, Massachusetts, United States to Arichat, Nova Scotia.
Paquete de Christiansund	Norway	The ship was driven ashore in the Faroe Islands. Her crew were rescued. She was on a voyage from Christiansund to a port in the south of Spain.
Providence	United Kingdom	The schooner was discovered derelict in the North Sea. She was taken in to "Watnemoe", Denmark.
Redwing	United States	The fishing schooner was lost at Chéticamp, Nova Scotia.

== 13 October ==
List of shipwrecks: 13 October 1851
Ship	State	Description
Dauntless	United Kingdom	The ship was driven ashore at Helsingør, Denmark. She was on a voyage from Seaham, County Durham to Kronstadt, Russia. She was refloated.
Elena	United States of the Ionian Islands	The brig was abandoned in the Mediterranean Sea. Her crew were rescued by Mystery (United Kingdom). Elena was on a voyage from the Dardanelles to London, United Kingdom.
Fifre	France	The brig was lost on the Lady Sand, in the North Sea off the coast of Essex, United Kingdom. Her crew were rescued. She was on a voyage from Newcastle upon Tyne, Northumberland, United Kingdom to Constantinople, Ottoman Empire.
Jane Strong	United Kingdom	The ship was lost near Talcahuano, Chile. She was on a voyage from Iquique, Chile to an English port.
Oak	United Kingdom	The ship was driven ashore at Helsingør. She was on a voyage from Inverkeithing, Fife to Kronstadt. She was refloated.
Wellington	United Kingdom	The ship was driven ashore on the coast of Russia. She was on a voyage from Dundee, Forfarshire to Riga, Russia. She was refloated the next day.

== 14 October ==
List of shipwrecks: 14 October 1851
Ship	State	Description
Fanny Fielder	United Kingdom	The ship ran aground off Skagen, Denmark. She was on a voyage from Liverpool, Lancashire to Pillau, Prussia. She had become a wreck by 24 October.
Lochmaben Castle	United Kingdom	The ship ran aground at the south west point of Anticosti Island, Nova Scotia, British North America and broke in two. Her crew were rescued. She was on a voyage from Quebec City, Province of Canada, British North Americat to Liverpool.
Ringdove	United Kingdom	The ship was wrecked in St Lawrence Bay.

== 15 October ==
List of shipwrecks: 15 October 1851
Ship	State	Description
America	United Kingdom	The sloop ran aground on Jordan's Bank, in Liverpool Bay. Her crew were rescued. She was on a voyage from New Ross, County Wexford to Liverpool, Lancashire.
Arno	United Kingdom	The ship was driven ashore and damaged in the Bosphorus. She was on a voyage from Galaţi, Ottoman Empire to Falmouth, Cornwall or Queenstown, County Cork.
Maori	(United Kingdom of Great Britain and Ireland) New Zealand	The Government schooner capsized during a squall while carrying passengers across the Mangere Harbour from Onehunga to Waiuku, with the loss of three lives.
Victoria	(United Kingdom of Great Britain and Ireland) Jersey	The ship was driven ashore at New Romney, Kent. She was on a voyage from London to Newfoundland, British North America. She was refloated.
Sally	United Kingdom	The schooner was driven ashore at Margate, Kent. She was on a voyage from Newcastle upon Tyne, Northumberland to Rouen, Seine-Inférieure, France. She was refloated the next day and resumed her voyage.

== 16 October ==
List of shipwrecks: 16 October 1851
Ship	State	Description
Albert	United Kingdom	The ship was driven ashore at Corran Ferry, Inverness-shire. She was on a voyage from Arklow, County Wicklow to Newcastle upon Tyne, Northumberland.
Dunkerquois	France	The ship ran aground on the Arc Bournon Bank, in the Black Sea. she was refloated and taken in to Kertch, Russia for repairs.
Emperor	United Kingdom	The ship ran aground on the Little Burbo Bank, in Liverpool Bay. She was on a voyage from Calcutta, company rule in India to Liverpool, Lancashire. She was refloated and completed her voyage.
Gesina	Flag unknown	The derelict koff was driven ashore and wrecked at "Karingoen", Sweden.
James	United Kingdom	The ship ran aground on the Kallebodstrand. She was on a voyage from Kronstadt, Russia to London. She was refloated on 22 October and towed in to Copenhagen, Denmark.
Stromdale	United Kingdom	The ship was driven ashore and severely damaged at Redcar, Yorkshire. She was on a voyage from Saint Petersburg, Russia to London.
Venknoun	Flag unknown	The schooner was driven ashore at Margate, Kent, United Kingdom.

== 17 October ==
List of shipwrecks: 17 October 1851
Ship	State	Description
Claudia	United Kingdom	The ship ran aground on the Gasorn Reef and was abandoned. She was on a voyage from Hull, Yorkshire to Kronstadt, Russia. She had become a wreck by 1 November.
Zilla	United Kingdom	The ship struck the Whitby Rock and was damaged. She consequently put back to Sunderland, County Durham.

== 18 October ==
List of shipwrecks: 18 October 1851
Ship	State	Description
Cyclops	United Kingdom	The steamship was run aground on the Filsand Reef, off Saaremaa, Russia. She was on a voyage from Newcastle upon Tyne, Northumberland to Saint Petersburg, Russia. She floated off and sank. Her crew were rescued.
Expedition	United Kingdom	The ship was in collision with a Russian barque off Gotland, Sweden and capsized with the loss of two of her crew. Although righted, she was abandoned on 22 October. Survivors were rescued by Elizabeth (United Kingdom). Expedition was on a voyage from Danzig to London. She came ashore on Öland, Sweden on 8 November.
Isabella	United Kingdom	The schooner was wrecked on Tory Island, County Donegal with the loss of all hands.
Meta	Prussia	The sloop ran aground whilst on a voyage from Kronstadt, Russia to Kiel. She had been refloated by 4 November.
Stralsund	Stralsund	The ship departed from Sunderland, County Durham, United Kingdom for Stettin. No further trace, presumed foundered with the loss of all hands.

== 19 October ==
List of shipwrecks: 19 October 1851
Ship	State	Description
Aspacia	Ottoman Empire	The ship was driven ashore in Carlingford Bay. She was refloated the next day and towed in to Warrenpoint, County Antrim, United Kingdom.
Connaught Ranger	United Kingdom	The steamship was wrecked at Bunaninver, County Donegal. She was on a voyage from Sligo to Liverpool, Lancashire and London.
Dolmen Terra Nova	Kingdom of the Two Sicilies	The ship sprang a leak and was abandoned in the Mediterranean Sea 10 nautical miles (19 km) off Cagliari, Sardinia. Her crew were rescued. She was on a voyage from Sicily to Saint-Valery-sur-Somme, Somme, France.
Gipsy	(United Kingdom of Great Britain and Ireland) British North America	The brig sprang a leak and was abandoned in the Atlantic Ocean. All on board were rescued by the schooner N. Baker (United Kingdom). Gipsy was on a voyage from Yarmouth, Nova Scotia to New York City.
Iris or Isis	United Kingdom	The brig ran aground on the Gunfleet Sand, in the North Sea off the coast of Essex. She was on a voyage from Great Yarmouth, Norfolk to London.
Jane	(United Kingdom of Great Britain and Ireland) British North America	The schooner was wrecked on Plum Island, Massachusetts, United States. Her crew were rescued. She was on a voyage from Tusket, Nova Scotia to Boston, Massachusetts.

== 20 October ==
List of shipwrecks: 20 October 1851
Ship	State	Description
Argus	(United Kingdom of Great Britain and Ireland) British North America	The ship sprang a leak whilst on a voyage from Saint John, New Brunswick to Portland, Maine, United States. She was abandoned the next day. Her crew were rescued.
Carwans	Malta	The ship ran aground on the Grado Shoals, in the Adriatic Sea She was on a voyage from Malta to Trieste.
Edmondstone	United Kingdom	The ship, which had previously sprang a leak, capsized in the Atlantic Ocean. Her crew were rescued. She was on a voyage from Saint Andrews, New Brunswick, British North America to London.
Fort William	United Kingdom	The receiving ship was destroyed by fire at Hong Kong.
Genova	United Kingdom	The steamship was damaged by fire at Liverpool.
Henrietta Charlotte	Prussia	The ship ran aground and was wrecked at Killybegs, County Donegal, United Kingdom. She was on a voyage from Memel to Ballyshannon, County Donegal.
James Wright	United States	The ship ran aground on the Kish Bank, in the Irish Sea. She was on a voyage from Liverpool, Lancashire, United Kingdom to New York. She was refloated the next day and resumed her voyage.
Maitland	(United Kingdom of Great Britain and Ireland) British North America	The brigantine was driven ashore and wrecked at Owl's Head Harbour, Nova Scotia. She was on a voyage from Labrador to Port Medway, Nova Scotia.
Packet	United Kingdom	The ship ran aground on the Grado Shoals, in the Adriatic Sea. She was on a voyage from Malta to Trieste.
St. Leon	Spain	The ship was abandoned in the Atlantic Ocean. She was on a voyage from Castine, Maine, United States to Cádiz.
Victory	United Kingdom	The schooner was driven ashore and wrecked at Coatham, Northumberland. Her crew were rescued.o

== 21 October ==
List of shipwrecks: 21 October 1851
Ship	State	Description
Bintang	United Kingdom	The ship was wrecked in the Pescadores. Five of her crew were loss when the vessel was attacked by the local inhabitants. She was on a voyage from Whampoa to Shanghai, China.
Mayflower	(United Kingdom of Great Britain and Ireland) British North America	The schooner was wrecked in Gooseberry Cove, Nova Scotia. She was on a voyage from Savannah, Georgia, United States to Louisbourg, Nova Scotia.
Vrouw Engelina	Netherlands	The ship was in collision with another vessel and sank in the North Sea with some loss of life. She was on a voyage from Fredrikstad, Norway to Harlingen, Friesland.
Vrouw Trintje	Prussia	The ship was abandoned in the North Sea. She was on a voyage from Rügenwalde to Ghent, East Flanders, Belgium. She was taken in to Cuxhaven.
Wallaby	(United Kingdom of Great Britain and Ireland) Van Diemen's Land	The whaler, a brigantine, was wrecked on Fanning Island.

== 22 October ==
List of shipwrecks: 22 October 1851
Ship	State	Description
Rebecca and Eliza	United Kingdom	The ship foundered off Stoer Head, Sutherland. She was on a voyage from Arklow, County Wicklow to Newcastle upon Tyne, Northumberland.
Scourfield	United Kingdom	The ship was driven, ashore in the Hooghly River during a cyclone. She had been refloated by 22 December and taken in to "Balinsore", India.

== 23 October ==
List of shipwrecks: 23 October 1851
Ship	State	Description
Ann and Elizabeth	United Kingdom	The schooner was wrecked on a reef 95 nautical miles (176 km) west of Alexandria, Egypt. Her crew were rescued. She was on a voyage from Newcastle upon Tyne, Northumberland to Alexandria, Egypt.
Argus	United States	The ship was abandoned off "Mohegan". She was on a voyage from Saint John, New Brunswick, British North America to Portland, Maine. She was subsequently towed in to Boothbay, Maine.
Bengalee	United Kingdom	The barque was driven ashore and broke her back at Saugor. She was abandoned by her crew. She was on a voyage from Calcutta to Genoa, Kingdom of Sardinia.
Betsey	United Kingdom	The flat was holed by an anchor and sank at Liverpool, Lancashire. She was on a voyage from Conwy, Caernarfonshire to Liverpool. She was refloated.
Hope	India	The ship was driven ashore and damaged at Saugor. She was later refloated and towed in to Calcutta for repairs.
James	France	The ship was lost at the mouth of the Hooghly River. Her crew were rescued.
Lahore	India	The ship ran aground on the Diamond Sand. She was refloated.
Magdalaine	France	The ship was driven ashore and wrecked on the south coast of Rodrigues. She was on a voyage from Calcutta to Réunion.
Mary Ann	United Kingdom	The ship ran aground on the Diamond Sand. She was later refloated.
Maupertuis	France	The ship was wrecked on a reef off Pointe des Jardins, Réunion. Her crew were rescued. She was on a voyage from Mauritius to Réunion.
Mentor	Sweden	The schooner departed from Kronstadt, Russia for Turku, Grand Duchy of Finland. No further trace, presumed foundered with the loss of all hands.
Panaja Eleusa	Greece	The barque sank in the Bristol Channel off Lundy Island, Devon, United Kingdom. Her crew were rescued. She was on a voyage from Cardiff, Glamorgan, United Kingdom to Malta.
Powerful	India	The tug was driven ashore at Calcutta with the loss of three lives. She was later refloated and towed in to Calcutta for repairs.
Precursor	India	The paddle steamer was driven ashore in the Hooghly River. She was on a voyage from Calcutta to Aden and Suez, Egypt. She was refloated and put back to Calcutta.
Sarah Ann Fowler	United States	The ship was in collision with Hopewell (United Kingdom) and was abandoned. Her crew were rescued. She was on a voyage from Boston, Massachusetts to Wilmington, North Carolina.

== 24 October ==
List of shipwrecks: 24 October 1851
Ship	State	Description
Carl Heinrich	Prussia	The ship ran aground off Karlskrona, Sweden. She was on a voyage from Memel to Belfast, County Antrim, United Kingdom. She was refloated on 28 October and taken in to Carlskrona.
Charlotte	United Kingdom	The ship was abandoned in the Atlantic Ocean (30°30′N 27°50′W). Fifteen of her crew were rescued by Harmony (United Kingdom); the remainder reached New York, United States in their boat. Charlotte was on a voyage from Bombay, India to Liverpool, Lancashire.
Henry Clay	United States	The steamship was wrecked in Lake Erie off Long Point, Province of Canada, British North America with the loss of all but one of her 30 passengers and crew.
Lady Eleanor	United Kingdom	The ship ran aground at Newhaven, Sussex. She was on a voyage from Newhaven to Liverpool, Lancashire.
Peace	United Kingdom	The brig foundered off The Smalls. Her crew were rescued by Queen Adelaide (United Kingdom).
Vanguard	United Kingdom	The ship ran aground at "Halpin's Pond". She was on a voyage from Dublin to Glasgow, Renfrewshire. She was refloated and resumed her voyage.

== 25 October ==
List of shipwrecks: 25 October 1851
Ship	State	Description
Adelaide	Kingdom of Hanover	The ship ran aground off Nexø, Denmark. Her crew were rescued. She was on a voyage from Kronstadt, Russia to Queenstown, County Cork, United Kingdom.
RMS Africa	United Kingdom	The steamship ran aground and was damaged on the Bush Rock, in the Copeland Islands, County Down. She was on a voyage from Liverpool, Lancashire to Halifax, Nova Scotia, British North America and New York, United States. Her 130 passengers were taken off by the steamships Laurel and Rover and the tug Belfast (all United Kingdom). RMS Africa was refloated the next day and put back to Liverpool escorted by Belfast.
Belle	United Kingdom	The ship was wrecked at Prospect, Nova Scotia. All on board were rescued. She was on a voyage from Boston, Massachusetts, United States to Halifax.
Britannia	United Kingdom	The ship departed from Gaspé, Province of Canada, British North America for Naples, Kingdom of the Two Sicilies. No further trace, presumed foundered with the loss of all hands.
Earl of Fife	United Kingdom	The ship ran aground on the Whitby Rock and was damaged. She was refloated and towed in to Whitby, Yorkshire.
Niord	Sweden	The ship ran aground and was wrecked. She was on a voyage from Stockholm to "Gamboda".
Rose	United Kingdom	The ship was driven ashore at Redcar, Yorkshire. She was on a voyage from London to Seaham, County Durham. She was refloated the next day.

== 26 October ==
List of shipwrecks: 26 October 1851
Ship	State	Description
Brothers	(United Kingdom of Great Britain and Ireland) British North America	The ship ran aground off "Swanscott" and was abandoned. She subsequqntly floated off and came ashore at Nahant, Massachusetts, United States, where she was wrecked.
Ceretica	United Kingdom	The schooner was driven ashore and wrecked in the Copeland Islands, County Antrim. She was on a voyage from Limerick to Liverpool, Lancashire.
Conferentsraad Clasen	Norway	The ship struck a sunken rock in the Wislem Inlet and was damaged. She was on a voyage from Fredrikstad to London, United Kingdom. She put back to Fredrikstad in a waterlogged condition.
Familien	Norway	The ship struck a sunken rock in the Wislem Inlet and was damaged. She was on a voyage from Fredrikstad to London. She put back to Fredrikstad.
Harbinger	United Kingdom	The ship was driven ashore at Mundesley, Norfolk. She was on a voyage from Hartlepool, County Durham to Great Yarmouth, Norfolk. She was refloated the next day and resumed her voyage.
Laura	United States	The sloop was wrecked on Little Island. She was on a voyage from Saint Thomas, Virgin Islands to New York.
Margaret and Ann	United Kingdom	The schooner was abandoned in the North Sea off St. Abb's Head, Berwickshire. Her crew were rescued. She was on a voyage from Sunderland, County Durham to the Firth of Forth.
Maria	United Kingdom	The ship was driven ashore and wrecked north of the mouth of the Narva River with the loss of a crew member. She was on a voyage from Liverpool to Narva, Russia.
Oernen	Norway	The ship ran aground and sank near "Bo". She was on a voyage from Christiansand to Ålesund.
Pauline Houghton	United Kingdom	The ship ran aground off Canoner's Point, Mauritius. She was on a voyage from London to Mauritius. She was refloated and taken in to Mauritius for repairs.
Victory	United Kingdom	The ship was wrecked near Petit-Métis, Province of Canada, British North America. All on board were rescued. She was on a voyage from Quebec City, Province of Canada to Plymouth, Devon.

== 27 October ==
List of shipwrecks: 27 October 1851
Ship	State	Description
Antje	Prussia	The ship was driven ashore at Donna Nook, Lincolnshire, United Kingdom. She was on a voyage from Königsberg to Grimsby, Lincolnshire.
Cornwall	United Kingdom	The steamship ran aground and was severely damaged at St. Ives, Cornwall. She was on a voyage from Bristol, Gloucestershire to St. Ives. She was refloated on 29 October.
George William	United Kingdom	The ship ran aground on the Goodwin Sands, Kent. All seven people on board were rescued by the lugger Diana (United Kingdom). George William was on a voyage from Quebec City, Province of Canada, British North America to London.
Jonas	France	The ship was damaged in a hurricane at Mazatland, Cuba. She was on a voyage from San Francisco, California, United States to "Ypala". She was consequently condemned.
HNLMS Lancier	Royal Netherlands Navy	The brigantine ran aground on the Goodwin Sands. She was on a voyage from Hellevoetsluis, Zeeland to Africa. She was refloated the next day.
Louisa Maria	United Kingdom	The ship was driven ashore on Saaremaa, Russia. She was on a voyage from Southampton, Hampshire to Saint Petersburg, Russia.
Marie	(United Kingdom of Great Britain and Ireland) British North America	The ship ran aground at the Brandy Pots. Her crew were rescued.
N. B.	(United Kingdom of Great Britain and Ireland) Jersey	The ship ran aground and sank at Paspébiac, Province of Canada. She was on a voyage from Brazil to Quebec City.
Oregon	United States	The ship foundered in the Atlantic Ocean with the loss of three lives. Survivors were rescued by Conductors (United Kingdom) Oregon was on a voyage from New York to Kingston, Jamaica.
Stella	Norway	The schooner ran aground and capsized on Scharhörn and was abandoned. Her crew were rescued by the steamship North Star (United Kingdom). Stella floated off and was subsequently wrecked on Neuwerk. She was on a voyage from Hammerfest to Cuxhaven.

== 28 October ==
List of shipwrecks: December 1851
Ship	State	Description
Baracoa	United Kingdom	The ship was wrecked on the south coast of Cuba. She was on a voyage from Jamaica to Glasgow, Renfrewshire.
Eiche	Hamburg	The ship collided with a cutter in the North Sea west of Heligoland and was abandoned. Her crew were rescued. She was on a voyage from Newcastle upon Tyne, Northumberland, United Kingdom to Hamburg.
Eulalia	Sweden	The ship was driven ashore near Christianopel. She was on a voyage from Gävle to Copenhagen, Denmark.
Galatea	United Kingdom	The ship was driven ashore in the Magdalen Islands, Nova Scotia, British North America. She was on a voyage from Quebec City, Province of Canada, British North America to Cardiff, Glamorgan.
Mayflower	(United Kingdom of Great Britain and Ireland) British North America	The schooner was lost in Placentia Bay.
Thistle	(United Kingdom of Great Britain and Ireland) British North America	The schooner was wrecked whilst on a voyage from Halifax, Nova Scotia to Quebec City.
Victoria	United Kingdom	The ship was wrecked in the Bay of St. George, Newfoundland.
Victorine	France	The ship was abandoned in the Atlantic Ocean. Her crew were rescued. She was on a voyage from Masagan, Morocco to Havre de Grâce, Seine-Inférieure.

== 29 October ==
List of shipwrecks: 29 October 1851
Ship	State	Description
Arthur	United Kingdom	The ship capsized in the North Sea and was abandoned the next day. She was on a voyage from Danzig to London.
Earl of Durham	United Kingdom	The ship departed from Quebec City, Province of Canada, British North America for London. No further trace, presumed foundered with the loss of all hands.
James Corner	United Kingdom	The ship ran aground on the Florida Reef. She was on a voyage from Liverpool, Lancashire to New Orleans, Louisiana, United States.
Nouvelle Intrepide	France	The ship was in collision with Surprise (United Kingdom) and sank. Her crew were rescued by Surprise. She was on a voyage from Hamburg to Nantes, Loire-Inférieure.
Pakett	(Russian Empire) Grand Duchy of Tuscany	The full-rigged ship foundered off Porkkalanniemi.
Queen	United Kingdom	The ship ran aground at Kronstadt, Russia. She was refloated on 30 October and placed under repair.
Reform	United Kingdom	The ship was wrecked on the Brock Rocks, off the coast of Aberdeenshire. Her crew were rescued. She was on a voyage from Inverness to Newcastle upon Tyne, Northumberland.
Taff of Twenty Two	United Kingdom	The sloop was lost off Wales at the mouth of the River Teifi.
Tagus	United Kingdom	The steamship ran aground at Southampton, Hampshire. She was on a voyage from Southampton to Constantinople, Ottoman Empire. She was refloated the next day and towed in to Southampton.

== 30 October ==
List of shipwrecks: 30 October 1851
Ship	State	Description
Andreas	Sweden	The ship was driven ashore and wrecked on Anholt, Denmark. Her crew were rescued. She was on a voyage from Antwerp, Belgium to Gothenburg.
Ariela	Greece	The brig was wrecked on San Pietro Island, Kingdom of Sardinia. She was on a voyage from Malta to Falmouth, Cornwall, United Kingdom.
Happet	(Russian Empire) Grand Duchy of Finland	The sloop was driven ashore and wrecked at Baltic Port, Russia. She was on a voyage from Riga, Russia to Christianstad, Sweden.
Hope	United Kingdom	The brig was wrecked on the Londiner Bank. She was on a voyage from Saint John, New Brunswick, British North America to Boston, Massachusetts, United States.
Johannes	Lübeck	The steamship was driven ashore and wrecked near "Birck", Duchy of Holstein. She was on a voyage from Lübeck to Flensburg, Duchy of Holstein.
John and Mary	United Kingdom	The sloop sank off Rhyl, Denbighshire. Her crew were rescued. She was on a voyage from Mostyn, Flintshire to Amlwch, Anglesey.
Judith	United Kingdom	The ship was driven ashore on Hirsholm, Denmark. She was on a voyage from Rostock to London. She was refloated and taken in to Frederikshavn.
Justinian	United Kingdom	The ship was driven ashore and severely damaged at Tynemouth, Northumberland. She was refloated on 3 November.
Klasina Maria	Russia	The ship was driven ashore and sank at "Baltic Port". She was on a voyage from Narva to Helsingør, Denmark.
L'Etoile de la Mer	France	The brig was wrecked on the Longsand, in the North Sea off the coast of Essex, United Kingdom. Her nine crew were rescued by the smacks Aurora's Increase, Tryal and Wonder (all United Kingdom). L'Etoile de la Mer was on a voyage from Arkhangelsk, Russia to Saint-Valery-sur-Somme, Somme.
Margaret	United Kingdom	The ship ran aground and was wrecked on the Nordre Ronner, off Læsø, Denmark. Her crew were rescued. She was on a voyage from Saint Petersburg, Russia to Dundee, Forfarshire.
N. Dar	France	The ship was wrecked at Saint-Louis, Senegal. Her crew were rescued.
Neptune	Norway	The ship was wrecked on Læsø, Denmark. She was on a voyage from Frederikshald to Randers, Denmark.
Nile	United Kingdom	The brig was driven ashore and wrecked at Sulina, Ottoman Empire. Her crew were rescued. she was on a voyage from London to Galaţi, Ottoman Empire. She had been refloated by 17 November and taken in to Galaţi.
O'Ferrall	Malta	The barque ran aground off Conil de la Frontera, Spain with the loss of her captain. Eighteen crew were rescued. She was on a voyage from Cardiff, Glamorgan, United Kingdom to Malta. She was refloated on 14 November but was driven ashore and wrecked.
Rifleman	United Kingdom	The ship was driven ashore and wrecked on Skagen, Denmark. Her crew were rescued. She was on a voyage from Danzig to London.
Tanjore	United Kingdom	The ship ran aground at Liverpool, Lancashire. She was on a voyage from Saint Petersburg, Russia to Liverpool. She was refloated.
Thames	United Kingdom	The ship was driven ashore and wrecked on "Wikata". Her crew were rescued. She was on a voyage from Kronstadt, Russia to London.

== 31 October ==
List of shipwrecks: 31 October 1851
Ship	State	Description
Caroline Mathilde	Hamburg	The ship was driven ashore and damaged at Cuxhaven. She was refloated.
Edward and Sophia	United Kingdom	The ship was wrecked on the Goodwin Sands, Kent with the loss of all hands.
Einigkeit	Hamburg	The ship was driven ashore at Cuxhaven. Her crew were rescued.
Favourite	United Kingdom	The ship was wrecked at Point Mizzinett, British North America. Her crew were rescued. She was on a voyage from Newcastle upon Tyne, Northumberland to Dalhousie, New Brunswick, British North America.
Friheten	Sweden	The ship was driven ashore and wrecked on the west coast of Öland. She was on a voyage from Copenhagen, Denmark to Kalmar.
Herald	United Kingdom	The ship was scuttled off Java, Netherlands East Indies by her crew, who had murdered five officers. The captain's wife was on board when she was scuttled. She was on a voyage from Shanghai, China to Leith, Lothian.
Iola	(United Kingdom of Great Britain and Ireland) British North America	The ship was driven ashore and damaged at Saint John, New Brunswick She was on a voyage from Saint John to Cárdenas, Cuba. She was refloated and towed in to Saint John by the steamship Fairy Queen ( (United Kingdom of Great Britain and Ireland) British North America.
Isabella	United Kingdom	The ship was driven ashore south of Helsingør. Denmark. She was on a voyage from Saint Petersburg, Russia to Hull, Yorkshire. She was refloated on 6 November and taken in to Copenhagen, Denmark.
Janet	United Kingdom	The ship was driven ashore near "Morupstanze", Denmark. She was on a voyage from Kronstadt, Russia to Bristol, Gloucestershire.
Jonge Tjalling	Netherlands	The ship was lost "near the Koog". Her crew were rescued. She was on a voyage from Königsberg, Prussia to Amsterdam, North Holland.
Neptune	Sweden	The ship ran aground and was wrecked. She was on a voyage from Ranea to Stockholm.
Nuovo Bon Cittadino	Flag unknown	The ship ran aground in the Tenedos Channel. She was on a voyage from Newcastle upon Tyne, Northumberland, United Kingdom to Constantinople, Ottoman Empire. She was refloated on 25 November.
Rhoda	United Kingdom	The ship was driven ashore near "Saesoe", Denmark. She was on a voyage from "Wyburg" to London.

== Unknown date ==
List of shipwrecks: Unknown date in October 1851
Ship	State	Description
Amos	Portugal	The schooner was driven ashore on Ref Island, Newfoundland, British North America. She was refloated and resumed her voyage to Quebec City.
HMS Bonetta	Royal Navy	The schooner was driven ashore. She was refloated and taken in to Rio de Janeiro, Brazil for repairs, arriving on 10 October.
Brothers	(United Kingdom of Great Britain and Ireland) British North America	The ship was wrecked at Covehead, Prince Edward Island with the loss of all hands before 21 October.
Burdon	United Kingdom	The ship foundered in the North Sea. She was on a voyage from Gothenburg, Sweden to London.
Corinth	United States	The ship ran aground on the Nantucket Shoal, off the coast of Massachusetts. She was on a voyage from Cádiz, Spain to Newburyport, Massachusetts. She was refloated.
Eleanor	United States	The fishing schooner was lost at Malpeque Bay, Prince Edward Island. crew saved.
Eliza Kirkbride	United Kingdom	The ship was driven ashore on the coast of the Grand Duchy of Finland. She was on a voyage from Saint Petersburg, Russia to London. She was refloated and consequently put in to "Baltic Port" in a waterlogged condition and ran aground there.
Enigheten	(Russian Empire) Grand Duchy of Finland	The ship was driven ashore and wrecked at "Margogaddarnes". She was on a voyage from Liverpool, Lancashire to Vaasa.
Fawn	United Kingdom	The ship's crew mutinied, murdered her officers and set her afire off Penang, Malaya. She was on a voyage from Singapore to Calcutta, India.
Garland	United States	The fishing schooner was lost in Bay of St. Lawrence. Crew saved.
George Browne	United States	The ship was wrecked on "Tiger Island" before 6 October. Her crew were rescued. She was on a voyage from California to Calcutta.
Gertrude	France	The ship ran aground in the Mississippi River downstream of New Orleans, Louisiana United States. She was on a voyage from Havre de Grâce, Seine-Inférieure to New Orleans.
Gezina	Netherlands	The tjalk was abandoned off Lindesnes, Norway before 15 October.
Harmonie	Flag unknown	The schooner was abandoned in the Baltic Sea before 3 October. She was discovered on that day by Stokesby (United Kingdom) and taken in to "Kilsadd", Norway.
Helene Frederika	Lübeck	The ship capsized off Enånger, Sweden with the loss of all hands before 15 October. She was on a voyage from Haparanda, Sweden to Lübeck.
Hudson	United Kingdom	The barque ran aground on a reef in Panama Bay and was damaged. She was refloated and put in to Lima, Peru, where she arrived on 27 October.
Janson	United Kingdom	The brigantine was abandoned in the North Sea. She was discovered 50 nautical miles (93 km) north east of the Farne Islands, Northumberland on 17 October by Exertion. Three crew were put aboard; they took her in to South Shields, County Durham.
Johanna	Prussia	The brig was abandoned in the North Sea before 10 October.
Juno	United Kingdom	The ship was driven ashore at Redcar, Yorkshire. She was refloated on 27 October and taken in to the River Tees.
Letitia Heyne	United Kingdom	The ship ran aground in the Magdalen Islands, Nova Scotia, British North America. She was on a voyage from Quebec City, Province of Canada to Liverpool.
Mary	(United Kingdom of Great Britain and Ireland) British North America	The schooner was wrecked on Hog Island with the loss of all hands.
Morning Star	United Kingdom	The ship ran aground on "Rosscar" before 15 October. She was on a voyage from Kronstadt, Russia to Helsinki, Grand Duchy of Finland. She was refloated and resumed her voyage.
Omnibus	France	The sloop was abandoned in the English Channel before 10 October. She was subsequently towed in to Dieppe, Seine-Inférieure in a derelict condition.
Osbourne	United Kingdom	The brig was lost at Chittagong, India before 20 October.
Pearl	United States	The schooner was driven ashore at Montauk Point, New York. She was on a voyage from Saint John, New Brunswick, British North America to New York City. She was refloated on 1 November and taken in to Long Island Sound.
Powhattan	United States	The fishing schooner was lost in Bay of St. Lawrence. Crew saved.
Princess	Norway	The ship was lost in the Gulf of Finland. She was on a voyage from Arendal to Sundsvall, Sweden.
Princeton	United States	The fishing schooner was lost in Bay of St. Lawrence. Lost with all 10 hands.
Rachel	United Kingdom	The ship was wrecked on the coast of Natal before 17 October.
Regulator	United Kingdom	The ship foundered in the Atlantic Ocean. Her crew were rescued by the steamship Imperador (Brazil). She was on a voyage from the Rio Grande to Liverpool.
Thorndale	United Kingdom	The ship was driven ashore at Redcar, Yorkshire.
Treasurer	United Kingdom	The ship was wrecked on the south coast of Cuba.
Tulloch Castle	United Kingdom	The ship ran aground in the Basilan Strait. She was on a voyage from China to Bombay, India. She was refloated and completed her voyage, arriving at Bombay on 17 October.
Victory	United Kingdom	The ship was driven ashore and wrecked at Coatham, Yorkshire. She was on a voyage from Lowestoft, Suffolk to West Hartlepool, County Durham.
Yarrow	(United Kingdom of Great Britain and Ireland) British North America	The ship was wrecked on Prince Edward Island.
