= Pewet Island =

Island in Essex, England

Coordinates: 51.73534°N 0.88202°E

Pewet Island (the name is sometimes spelt Pewit) lies on the south side of the estuary of the River Blackwater in the English county of Essex.

Pewet Island is off the hamlet of Bradwell Waterside. It is notable for the presence of the remains of Saxon era timber fishtraps. Although sometimes referred to

It is currently owned by G Isles & Sons, a farming family from Bradwell Waterside.
