= St Lawrence Bay =

Village in Essex, England

Coordinates: 51.720°N 0.822°E

- Location within Essex
- OS grid reference: TL934029
- Shire county: Essex
- Region: East
- Country: England
- Sovereign state: United Kingdom
- Post town: Southminster
- Postcode district: CM0
- Dialling code: 01621
- Police: Essex
- Fire: Essex
- Ambulance: East of England
- UK Parliament: Maldon and East Chelmsford

St Lawrence Bay is a village in Essex, UK. It is in an area known as the Dengie Hundred, next to the River Blackwater.

The village is now known as St Lawrence, Essex which comprises the two settlements of St Lawrence Bay and Ramsey Island. The population is included in the civil parish of Steeple.

St Lawrence has the local nickname of 'Stone'.

== Parish Council ==
St Lawrence Parish Council meets monthly in St Lawrence Church Hall

== History ==
In the past the village was known as St Lawrence Newland a reference to clearing the forest to make way for farming that created the village.

== Church ==
St Lawrence Parish Church is built on a high spot at the southern edge of the village. The church has been designated as a rural discovery church and as such displays regular exhibitions. Three generations of the Wedgewood Benn family including Viscount Stansgate are commemorated in this church

== Leisure activities ==
The village is famous for sailing and watersports, which bring in many tourists during the summer. However, one of the two caravan parks has been almost completely replaced by housing.

St Lawrence Bay is home to Stone Sailing Club and to a watersports club.
