= Tillingham =

Village in Essex, England

Coordinates: 51.698°N 0.883°E

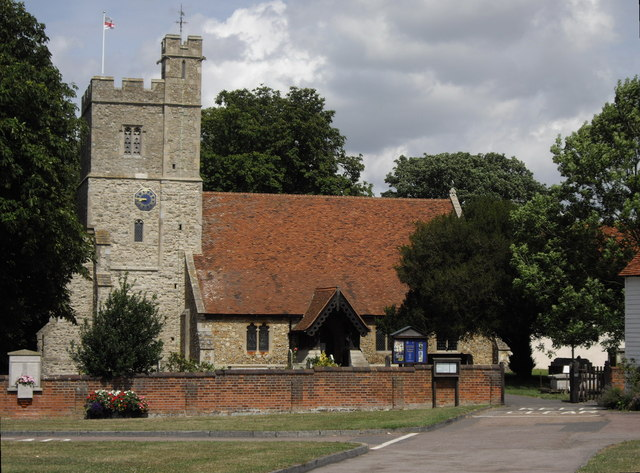
- St Nicholas' Church

- Location within Essex
- Population: 1,058 (2011)
- OS grid reference: TL993038
- Civil parish: Tillingham
- District: Maldon
- Shire county: Essex
- Region: East
- Country: England
- Sovereign state: United Kingdom
- Post town: SOUTHMINSTER
- Postcode district: CM0
- Dialling code: 01621
- Police: Essex
- Fire: Essex
- Ambulance: East of England
- UK Parliament: Maldon

Tillingham is a small village and civil parish with 1,015 inhabitants in 2001, increasing to 1,058 at the 2011 Census. Located 8 miles (13 km) from Burnham-on-Crouch and 3 miles (4.8 km) from Bradwell-on-Sea, on the Dengie Peninsula which is a Maldon District part of the ceremonial county of Essex in England. It is one of the villages that make up the ancient Dengie Hundred, which is bounded by the North Sea, River Blackwater and River Crouch.

The village has strong links with St Paul's Cathedral in London. The Corporation of the Cathedral Church of St Paul owns three arable farms, domestic properties and a significant amount of surrounding land.

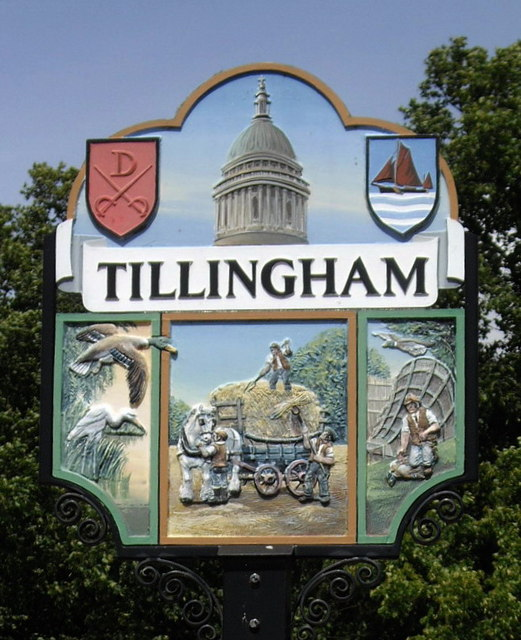
The village sign in Tillingham, showing the dome of St Paul’s Cathedral in London, referencing the cathedral’s local land-holdings

Tillingham village is clustered around the main street with a historic centre that has been designated as a conservation area.

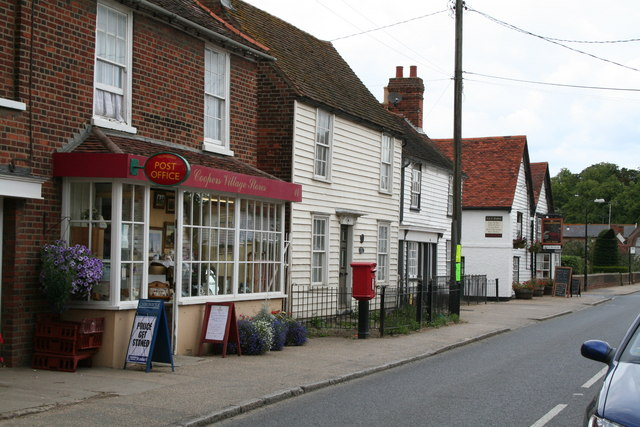
Tillingham Post Office, Essex

The conservation area in Tillingham was designated on 15 July 1969, since which there have been no revisions to the boundaries. It covers the historic settlement, which at the time of designation comprised the majority of the village.

The conservation area centres on the parish church of St. Nicholas and The Square stretching along the linear pattern of North Street and South Street. Short lengths of side roads off The Square and North and South Streets are also included: these are Brook Road, Bradwell Road, Marsh Road, Vicarage Lane, Casey Lane, Chapel Lane and Marlborough Avenue.

== Governance ==
An electoral ward in the same name exists. This ward includes Bradwell-on-Sea and had a total population at the 2011 Census of 2,182.

== Demography Census 2021 ==
Gender
Female	Male
51.9%	48.1%

Age Groups
0–17 years	18–64 years	65+ years
21.4%	55.1%	23.5%

Ethnic Groups
Other	Mixed	Arab	Asian	White
0.3%	0.4%	0.1%	0.5%	98.7%

Religion
Christian	Muslim	Hindu	Buddhist	Jewish	Other	No religion	unknown
52.1%	0.1%	0.4%	0.2%	0.1	1.4%	42.7%	3%

== Climate ==
Monthly Daytime Temperatures 2023
	Jan	Feb	Mar	Apr	May	Jun	Jul	Aug	Sept	Oct	Nov	Dec
Highest	14°	15°	16°	19°	20°	31°	27°	27°	31°	25°	17°	15°
Lowest	1°	6°	3°	10°	12°	15°	18°	19°	17°	10°	5°	3°

== Cultural Reference ==
Tillingham is mentioned on page 174 of the H. G. Wells novel The War of the Worlds. It is the place where the narrator's brother arrives at the coast following his escape from London during the Martian invasion. The full novel was first published in hardcover in 1898 by William Heinemann. The War of the Worlds is one of the earliest stories to detail a conflict between humankind and an extraterrestrial race.

Less well known is the story of “The Ranter’s Monster”, a tale of a young pregnant Tillingham girl called Mary Adams accused of giving birth to the devil. Claiming to be the Virgin Mary, she was locked up by order of the vicar, later giving birth to a severely deformed stillborn child, the monster named in the title of the story. So the story goes, she broke out in boils and nasty scabs and died a few days later.

== Facilities & Services ==
There are two schools; Tillingham Pre-School and St Nicholas C of E primary school, a fire station, medical centre, Post Office, Londis convenience shop, hairdressers, care home, village hall, Tillingham West Field recreation ground, car park, sports clubs, 18 allotment plots, mobile library, an Airbnb facility and an annual flower show. There are two chapels, the Peculiar People's chapel and the Congregational Chapel, a 14th-century parish church of St Nicholas, and two pubs; "The Fox and Hounds"

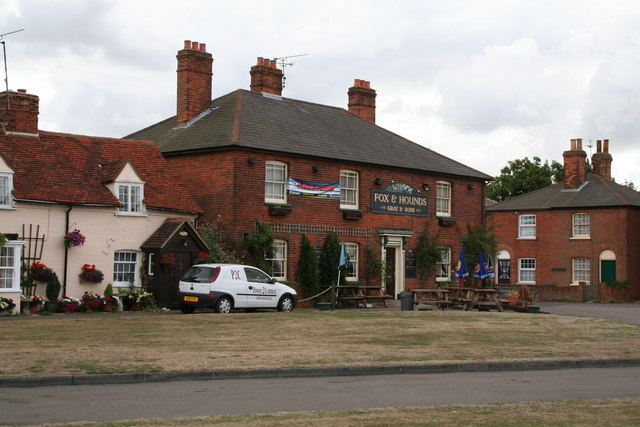
Fox and Hounds, Tillingham, Essex

and "The Cap and Feathers" which won the CAMRA national pub of the year award in 1998 and the most improved pub of the year award in 2023. Some say the weather boarded grade II listed pub is haunted.

The Cap and Feathers stands on some of the oldest ecclesiastical property in the land. As a place of hostelry its history can be traced back to the twelfth century when it was a pilgrim's lodging house. In the sixteenth century it became the village inn.

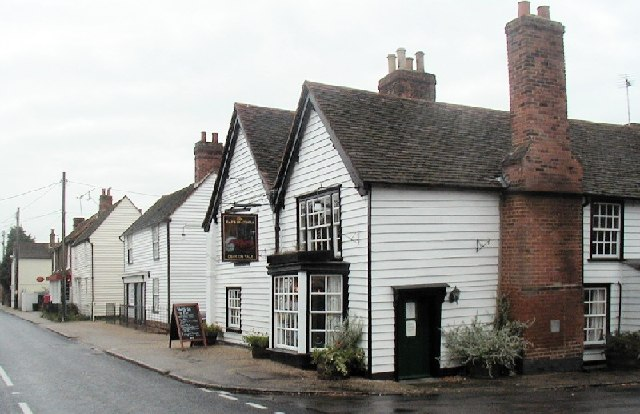
The Cap and Feathers, Tillingham

There is a network of well-maintained footpaths which meander through surrounding farmland and along the sea wall. The popular ‘St Peters Way’ footpath passes through Tillingham.

== Church of St Nicholas ==
There is a Grade II* listed church on The Square dedicated to St Nicholas.

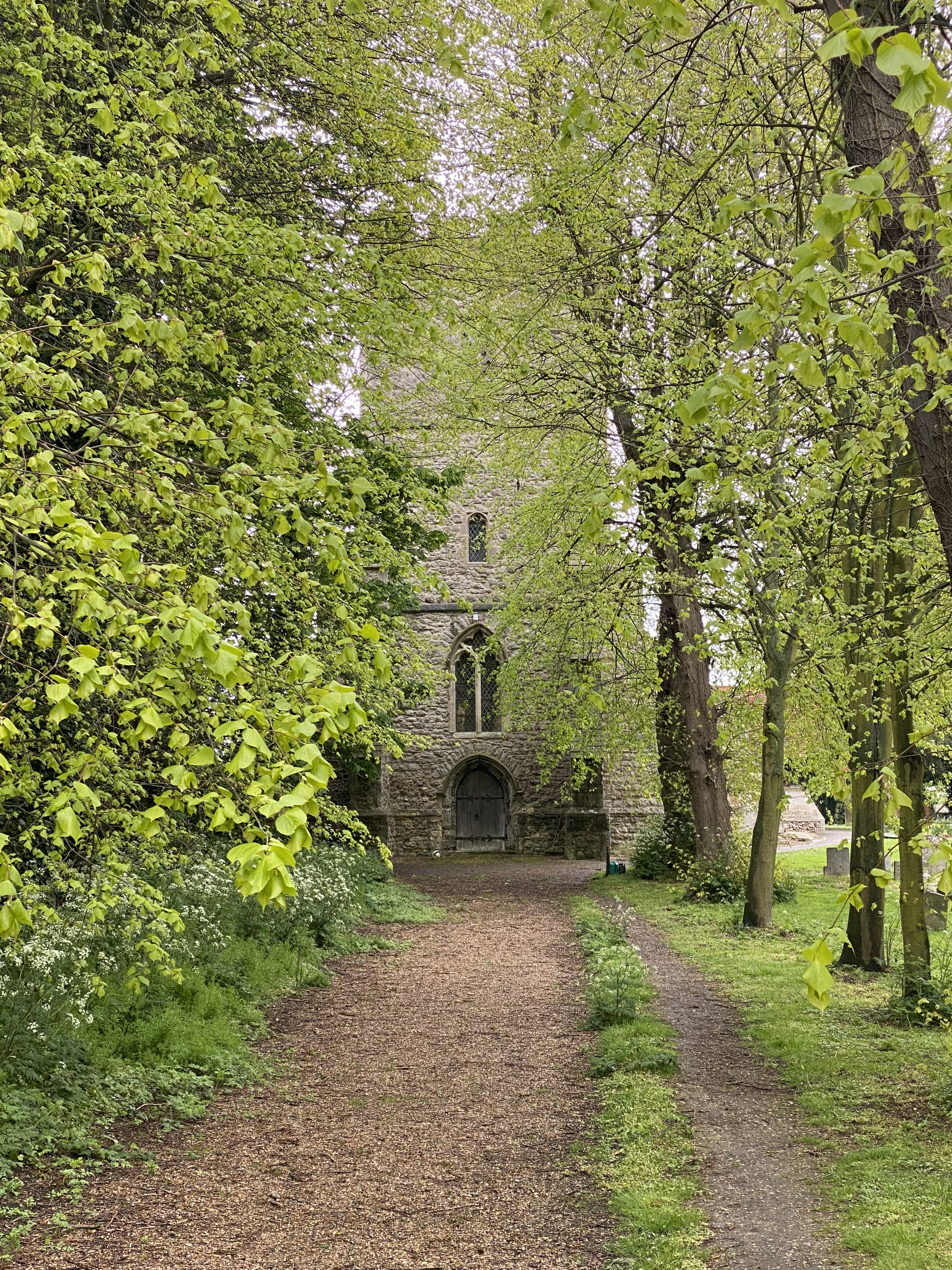
St Nicholas’s Parish Church

The Parish church, which is of Norman origin, is at the heart of the conservation area, with the manorial hall to the North. Stows Farmhouse (grade II* listed) thought to be a vicarage is outside the conservation area boundary. The church has a 14th-century tower with later battlements. Much of the rest of the church is 13th and 14th century, with a Norman north doorway and font. Inside, a Victorian rood screen and rood with Christ on the Cross separates the nave from the chancel, and notably defies the tradition of traditional timber-framed buildings of Essex. It has a king-post roof with ridge pole, not common until the nineteenth century in Essex. This building’s exceptional quality and rare detailing shows its link with the major local land owners, St Paul’s Cathedral, and the work of a church carpenter rather than a craftsman from Essex or East Anglia.

The church has very strong links with St Paul's Cathedral in London. The Corporation of the Cathedral Church of St Paul in London owns three arable farms and domestic properties in Tillingham, known as the Prebends of Ealdland, Reculverland and Weldland.; it has been in their control since c.720 AD, and they still retain the right to appoint the local vicar in the village. St Paul’s had a significant land holding across the Dengie Peninsula and the south coast of Essex through the Middle Ages. This brought great wealth through sheep farming and later arable crops. Links go back to, at least, the middle of the 15th Century, and the Cathedral remains the patron of the Parish Church.

In the churchyard are two Commonwealth War Graves from World War One: William Bowtle, Stoker 1st Class, who served on the Royal Navy's HMS P.60, who died on 4 January 1918 age 24. Also buried is Private Henry Sandford, who died on 31 July 1917 aged 18.

The Peculiar People, who opened their Chapel in 1867, were renamed in the 1950s the Union of Evangelical Churches. Their chapel in Tillingham closed down around 2005.

== Tillingham Marshes ==
Tillingham Marshes form part of a natural defensive barrier against the encroaching sea on the east coast of Essex; a long dyke separates fields on one side with the raw salt marsh on the other, whose stretches help to ease tidal action. It is owned by St. Paul's Cathedral, who were given the land in 604AD by the King of Kent.

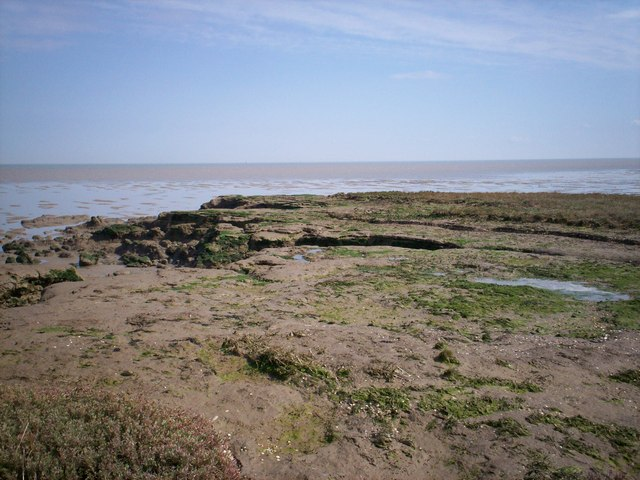
Tillingham Marshes - far eastern edge

The marshes came under threat from plans by power firm nPower to develop a large wind farm on the peninsula. The plan was eventually dropped in 2005 when St. Paul's decided not to allow it to proceed, having been opposed by local residents and those concerned with the wildlife in the area.

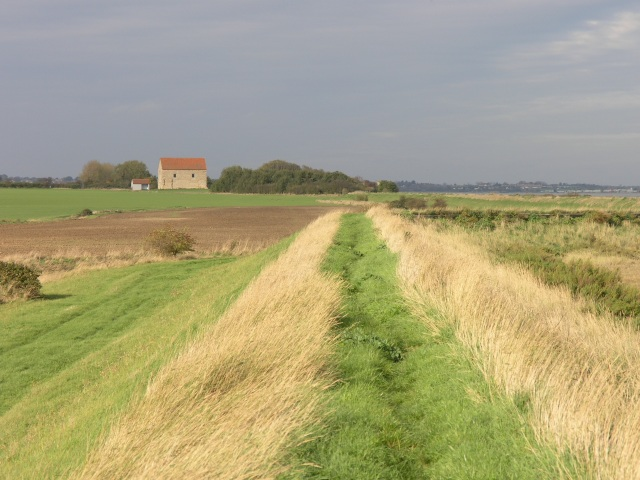
St Peter's Way

== Tillingham To Dengie National Nature Reserve ==
Explore this 9.9 miles (15.9 km) loop trail. Generally considered an easy route, it takes an average of 3h 16m to complete. This trail is great for birding and hiking, and it is unlikely that one will encounter many other people while exploring. The trail is open year-round and is beautiful to visit anytime.

The route follows a circular path across the Dengie Peninsula, passing along the coast and through the Dengie National Nature Reserve, with a stop at the Chapel of Saint-Peter-on-the-Wall.

This trail starts in Tillingham and leads one across the farmland to Bradwell on Sea before continuing to the Chapel of St-Peter-on-the-Wall on the edge of the Dengie National Nature Reserve. The Chapel of Saint-Peter-on-the-Wall dates back to around 654. This simple church is a Grade I listed building and is considered one of the oldest churches in England. It was founded on the wall of the Roman fort “Othona”.

After exploring the site, continue along the edge of the Dengie National Nature Reserve, which covers 3,105 hectares of saltmarsh and tidal mudflat. It is a Site of Special Scientific Interest and a haven for birdlife, so make sure to keep an eye out for wildfowl and waders.

Continue along the coastline before heading across the farmland to return to Tillingham.

== The West Field ==
The West Field on Vicarage Lane, is a large, well equipped site with easy access near the centre of the village. In 2004 the site received the Essex Playing Field Association Best Kept Playing Field Award and in 2005 won first prize for the Best Kept Children's Play Ground.

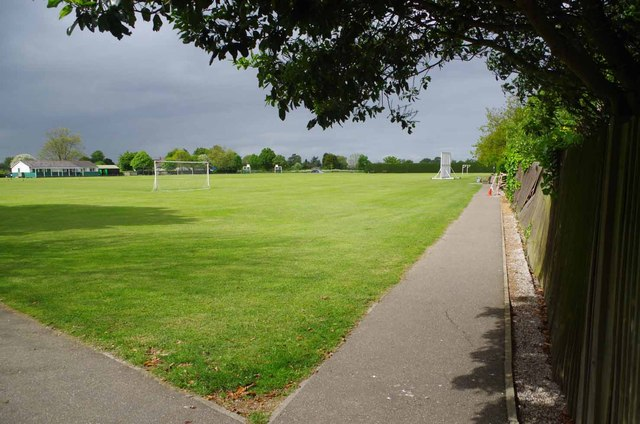
Playing Field, St Peter's Way

The Recreation Ground owned and maintained by Tillingham Village Council. It is also used by Tillingham Hotspur Football Club, Tillingham Tigers Football Club, Tillingham Cricket Club, Tillingham Bowls Club and the annual Tillingham Flower Show.

The Sports Pavilion building is owned by the Cricket and Football Clubs. Tillingham Bowls Club lease the Bowls Club area. The children's play area is found towards the north-west corner. The multi track area consists of a small ‘figure of eight’ tarmac circuit with three ramps. The circuit is ideal for learning to ride a bike, children scootering, roller skating, skateboarding and then to the more adventurous BMX bike skills! This is a free facility.

The multi use games area was built in 2014, at the request of young people who live in the village. It was created with grant funding and a considerable amount of volunteer labour.

The public West Field Car Park is located off the north-east corner of the West Field, behind St Nicholas Primary School and opposite St Nicholas Church.

== Sports & Social Clubs ==
Tillingham has several sports clubs which include:

- Cap & Feathers Pool Team
- Fox and Hounds Pool Team
- Tillingham Bowls Club
- Tillingham Cricket Club
- Tillingham Darts Team
- Tillingham Hotspur Football Club, which also run 2 veterans teams that plays in the Essex Veterans League.
- Tillingham Tigers Youth Football Club

== Mobile Library ==
To supplement the libraries at Burnham on Crouch and Southminster, Essex Libraries offer a mobile library service in Tillingham. The mobile library visits the village square once every three weeks.

== Tillingham Flower Show ==
Tillingham has an annual flower show, held in the West Field. The show kicks off with a procession through the village, starting from the top of Manor Road in Dengie. The procession includes Tillingham fire crew with their fire engine, vintage cars, tractors, dancers, Tillingham Tigers FC, fancy dress and floats.

On the field, there is plenty for everyone! Highlights include a Dog Show, dog scurry, dance performances, Tillingham Tigers penalty shoot out, the Tillingham Stocks, donkey rides, tug of war, arts, crafts, and two tents bursting with horticultural and handicraft entries.

Visitors can indulge in a Pimms and Prosecco tent, enjoy drinks from a horsebox bar, and savour tasty treats from an ice cream van, barbecue and Hog Roast.

A Best Dressed House and Scarecrow competition will also takes place over the weekend.

== Grade II Listed Buildings ==
- Blackbirds Bradwell Road
- The Cap and Feathers Public House, South Street Tillingham
- Chancel Mead
- The Fox and Hounds Public House, The Square Tilllingham
- L Plan Outbuilding Range to South of the Cap and Feathers Public House
- Latchkey Cottage
- Little Savages, Bradwell Road
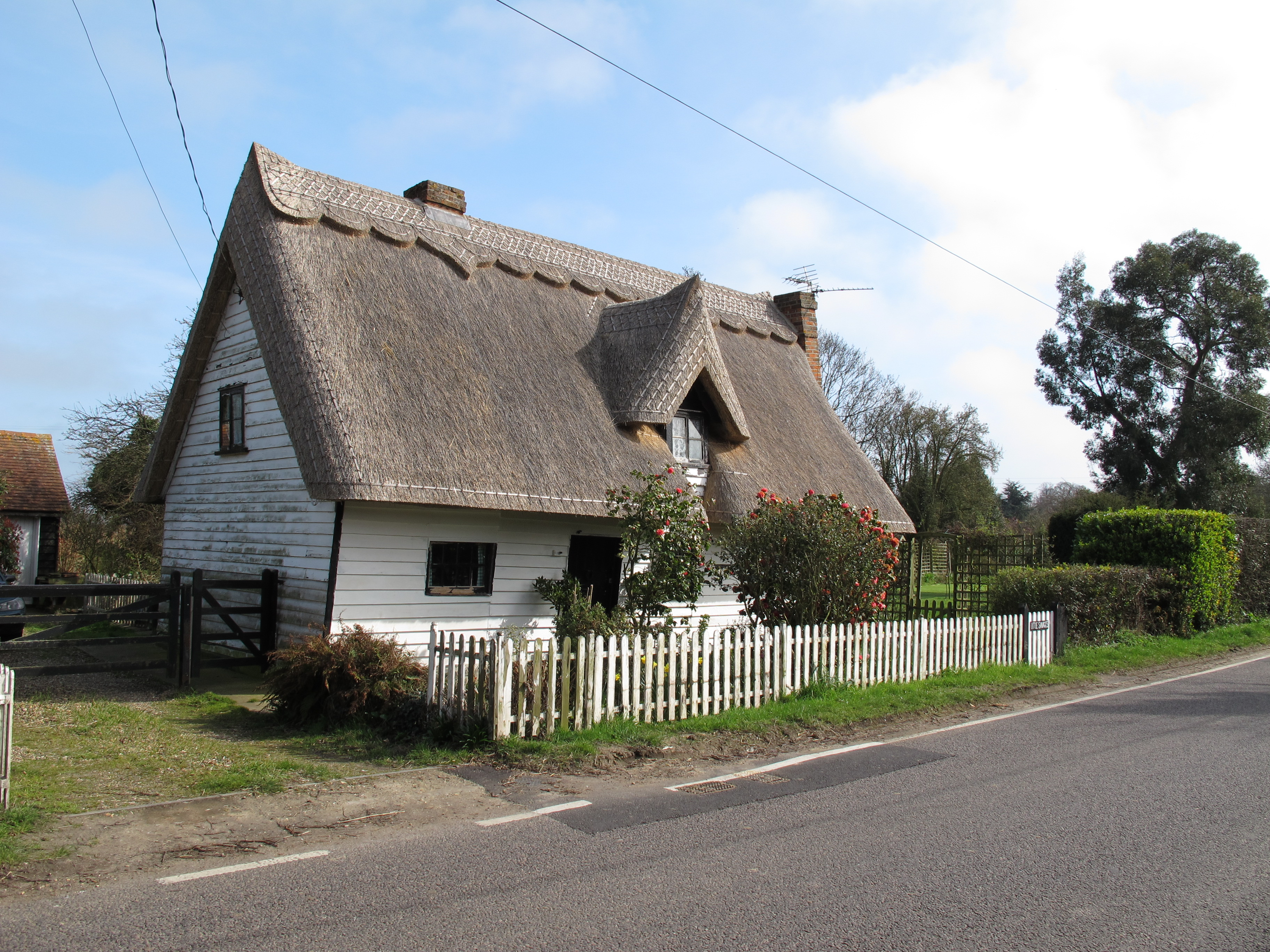
  Little Savages
- Little Seas
- The Manse Brook Road
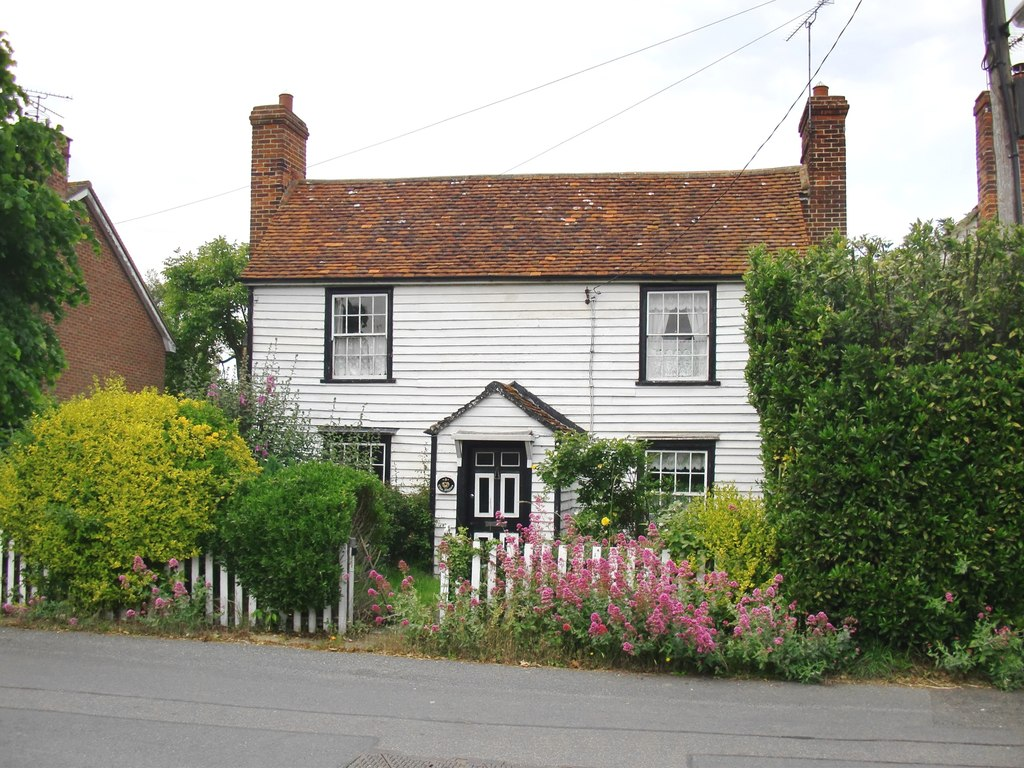
  Weather-boarded cottage at Tillingham
- Merchants House
- The Olde House North Street Tillingham
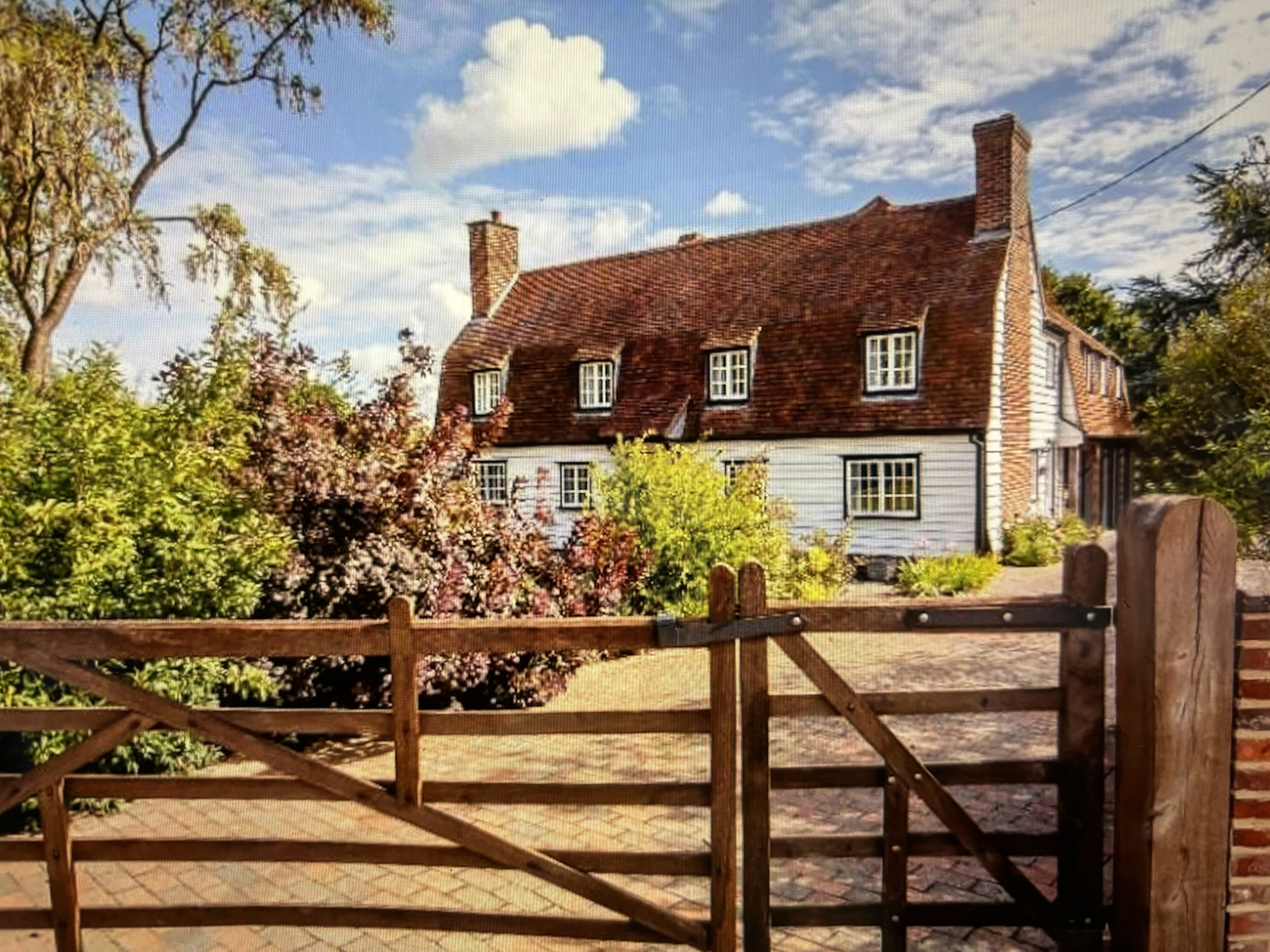
  The Olde House, North Street
- Pump (Approximately 3 Metres South of Sports Pavilion)

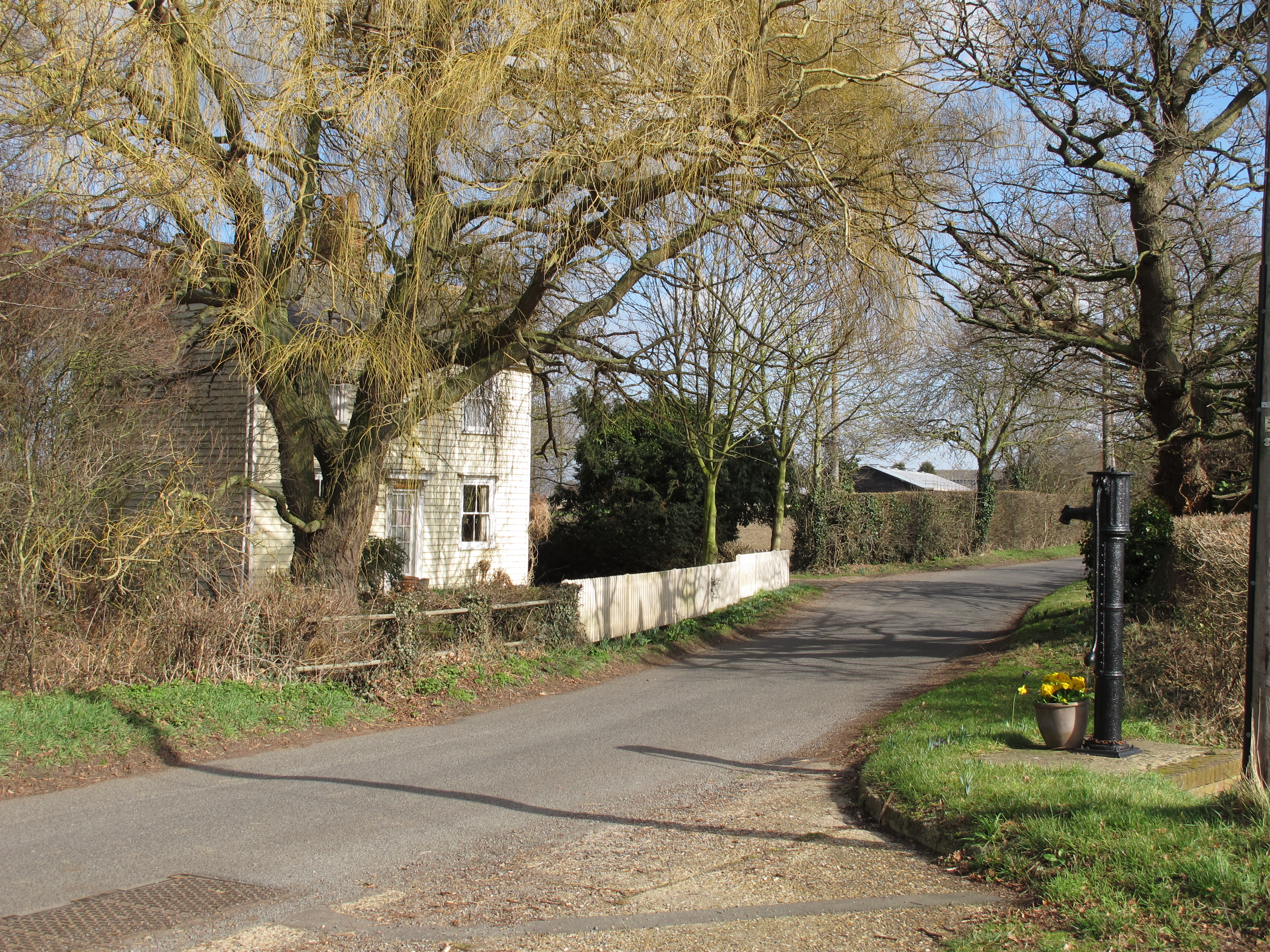
Water pump, Willow, Cottage

- Pump (Opposite and Approximately 20 Metres South West of Brook Cottage)
- Quinneys
- Rose Cottage and Attached Former Butchers Shop
- Shop Formerly a Butchers Shop and Adjoining Number 19 to the North
- Stow Cottage
- Stows Farmhouse
- Telephone Kiosk, The Square
- Thatched Cottage

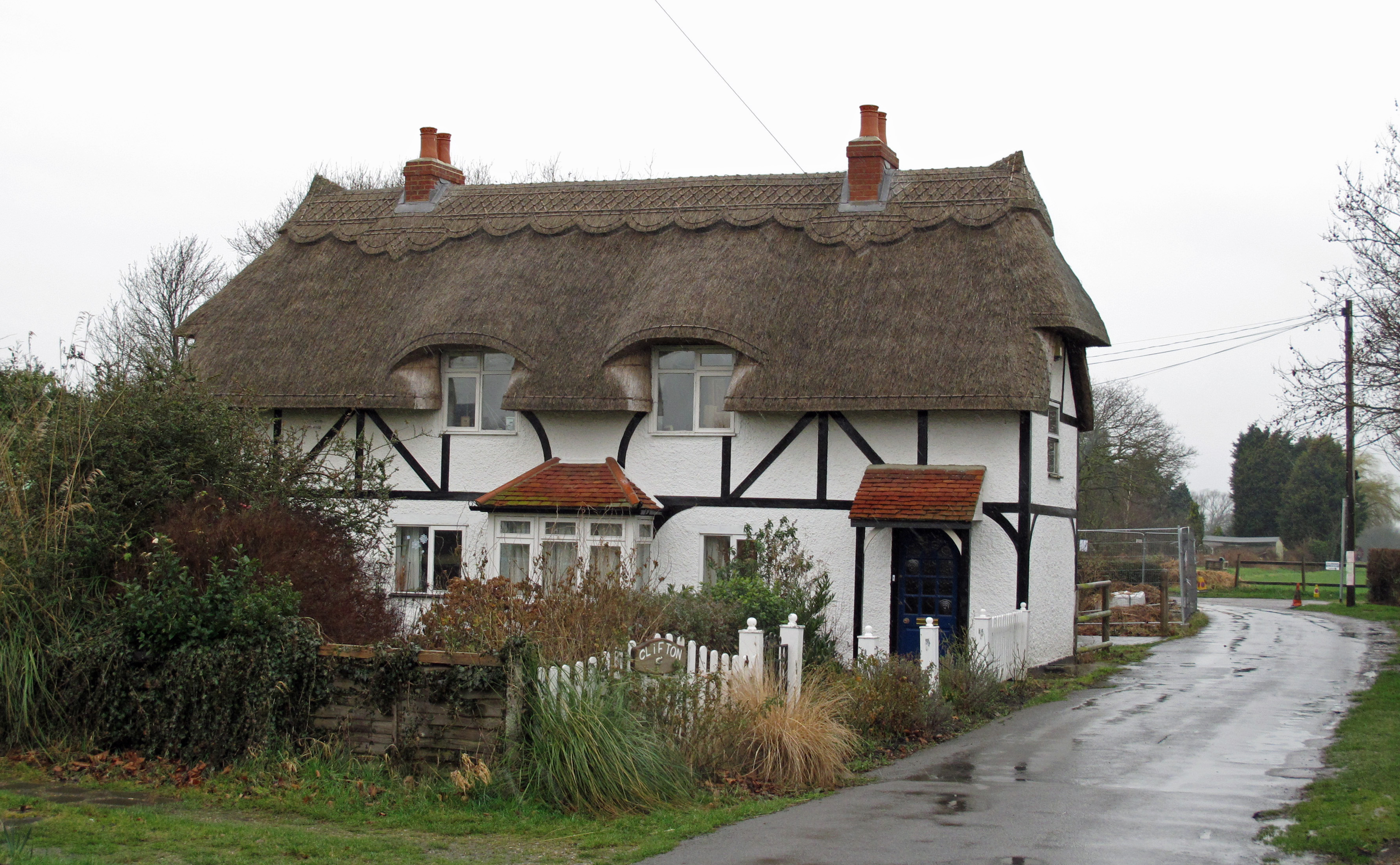
Thatched Cottage, Vicarage Lane

- Tillingham Post Office and House, South Street
- Village Pump, on Green Approximately 30 Metres West of Fox and Hounds Public House
- 1, 2, 7, 9, 16, 18, 52 and 54 The Square
- 13 and 25 North Street
- 1–5, 7, 9 and 12 South Street
- 3 Vicarage Lane

== Grade II* Listed Buildings ==
- Church of St Nicholas, 18 The Square Tillingham CM0 7SU
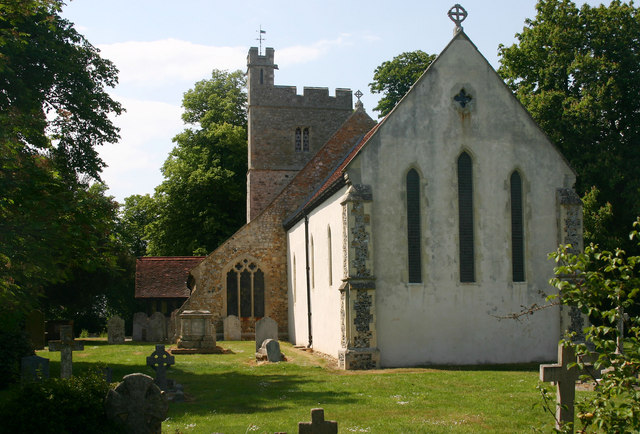
  St Nicholas, Tillingham

== Transport ==
The distance between London and Tillingham by road is 57 miles (93 km). The journey takes approximately 1h 14m by car using the A13.

The nearest railway stations are at Southminster and Burnham-on-Crouch which offer frequent services to South Woodham Ferrers, Billericay and London Liverpool Street, the quickest trains are 1hr 15m.

Local buses, the most frequent service is the Dengie route D4 which operates to Southminster and Burnham-on-Crouch. Fords Coaches operate the fortnightly service 3 into Chelmsford.

Three airports are within easy reach of Tillingham. London Southend Airport is 28 miles away, approximately 45m by car. London Stansted Airport is 40 miles by road, journey time just over an hour. London City Airport is by road distance 50 miles. The journey time by car is approximately 1h 10m and 1h 25m by train from Southminster Railway Station.

== Tillingham Private Airstrip ==
Tillingham Private Airstrip is at Stowes Farm. This civil-use airstrip was first used in 1984 and is still in use today. This airport has no ICAO airport code, it uses GB-0433 as a reference.

There is a public footpath which runs north to south through the farm and then adjacent to the runway. The runway is also visible from Tillingham Road immediately to the south.

Coordinates: 51°41'34"N - 0°52'25"E

== Notable People ==
Protestant resident Thomas Causton who was burnt at the stake was born in Tillingham. The Obelisk in Rayleigh High Street says Near this spot suffered for the truth Thomas Causton 26 March 1555.

Mary Adams, a Tillingham girl, was accused of giving birth to the ‘Devil’.

Major Baker, who “suffered for the King at the Siege of Colchester” in 1648, founded four almshouses in the village. The village lost 23 men during the Great War and another 4 during the Second World War.
