= Steeple, Essex =

Village in Essex, England

Coordinates: 51.691°N 0.799°E

Steeple
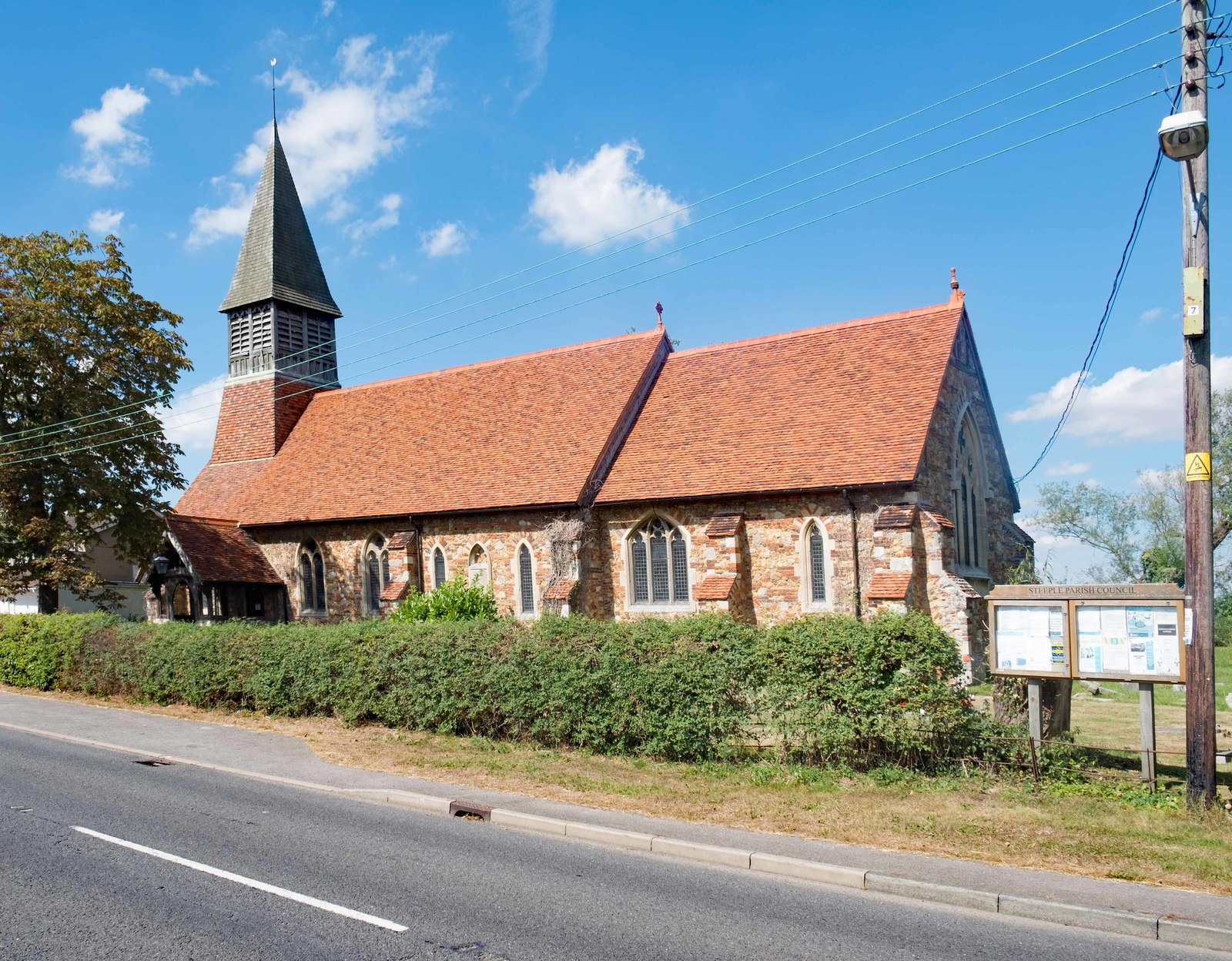
- St Lawrence and All Saints' Church, Steeple

- Location within Essex
- Population: 486 (Parish, 2021)
- OS grid reference: TL934029
- District: Maldon
- Shire county: Essex
- Region: East
- Country: England
- Sovereign state: United Kingdom
- Post town: Southminster
- Postcode district: CM0
- Dialling code: 01621
- Police: Essex
- Fire: Essex
- Ambulance: East of England
- UK Parliament: Maldon

Steeple is a village on the Dengie Peninsula in Essex, England. It is situated just east of Maylandsea and Mayland, on the southern side of the River Blackwater estuary. The parish also includes the small hamlet of Stansgate on the banks of Blackwater. At the 2021 census the parish had a population of 486.

== Amenities ==
The village has no shops, but does have a pub called The Star, which has a serviced touring field to the rear with 40 pitches as well as four rooms for visitors.

== Steeple Church ==
The original parish church of St Lawrence, located 600 yards (550 m) west of the present building, was destroyed by fire. The current church was built in the centre of the village c. 1882–84 re-using some materials from the old church.

On the west side of the village, there is a former chapel building of the Peculiar People, built in 1877.

== Stansgate Priory ==
Stansgate Priory was a Cluniac Priory built near to the banks of the River Blackwater in about 1120. It was one of many priories closed by Thomas Cromwell in 1534.

== Viscounts Stansgate ==
The village has been home to several generations of the Benn family, who were created Viscounts Stansgate in 1942, since about 1900. They live in Stansgate House.
