= Mayland, Essex =

Village in Essex, England

Coordinates: 51.687°N 0.754°E

Mayland
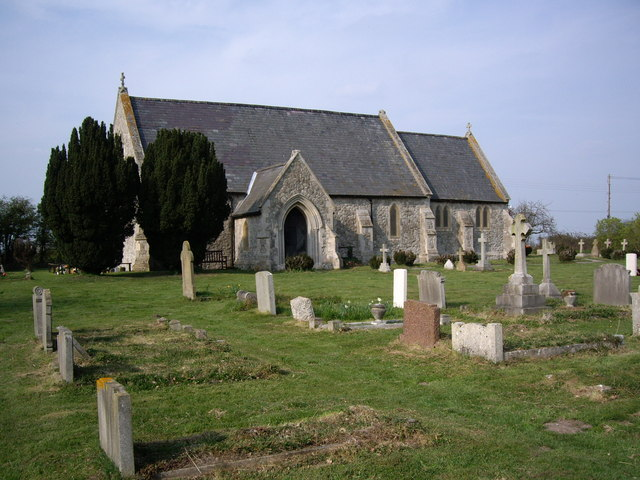
- Parish church of St Barnabas

- Location within Essex
- Population: 3,873 (Parish, 2021); 3,797 (Built up area, 2021)
- OS grid reference: TL904022
- Civil parish: Mayland
- District: Maldon
- Shire county: Essex
- Region: East
- Country: England
- Sovereign state: United Kingdom
- Post town: CHELMSFORD
- Postcode district: CM3
- Dialling code: 01245, 01621
- Police: Essex
- Fire: Essex
- Ambulance: East of England
- UK Parliament: Maldon

Mayland is a village and civil parish on the Dengie Peninsula in the Maldon District of Essex, England. The northern part of the built up area is also known as Maylandsea, which faces onto a creek which forms part of the Blackwater Estuary. At the 2021 census the parish had a population of 3,873 and the Mayland built up area as defined by the Office for National Statistics (which includes Maylandsea) had a population of 3,797.

== Toponymy ==
The meaning of Mayland is uncertain. It may mean the place where mayweed grows, or alternatively "at the island" in the sense of an area of drier ground within a wider marshy landscape.

The northern part of the built up area is also known as Maylandsea; the main parade of shops is on Imperial Avenue at the Maylandsea end of the village and the village school is called Maylandsea Primary School. Mayland is the official name of both the civil and ecclesiastical parish, and the name of the built up area as defined by the Office for National Statistics, which includes Maylandsea. The Royal Mail also uses Mayland in official postal addresses, including for the Maylandsea end of the village.

== History ==
Mayland was an ancient parish in the Dengie Hundred of Essex. The original settlement was a little way inland around the manor house of Mayland Hall and the adjoining church of St Barnabas. The medieval church stood immediately north of Mayland Hall. A replacement church was built in 1867 on a new site a short distance south of Mayland Hall.

At the end of the 19th century, the part of the parish north of the settlement around Mayland Hall included a windmill and a couple of farms but little else by way of development. In 1906, Nipsell's Farm, which covered much of the northern part of the parish, was bought by Joseph Fels for division into plotlands as part of the Back-to-the-land movement. This area then developed into Lower Mayland, centred on Steeple Road, and Maylandsea, on the banks of the estuary. There was sporadic plotlands development between Lower Mayland and Maylandsea. Lower Mayland and Maylandsea gradually consolidated into a single built up area, which the Office for National Statistics calls Mayland, but the parish council refers to as "Mayland / Maylandsea" in its Neighbourhood Plan.

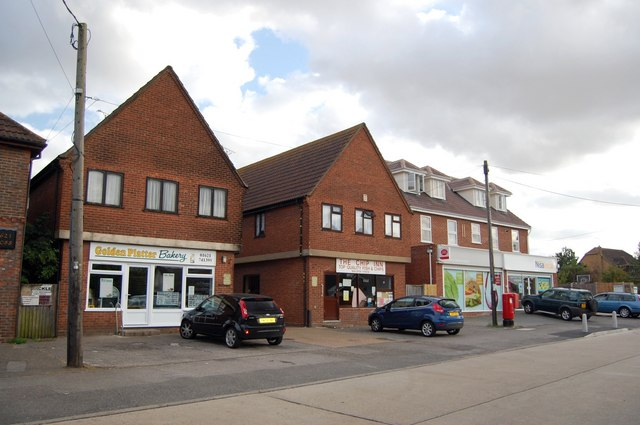
Shops on Imperial Avenue, Maylandsea

As Maylandsea grew, it expanded westwards into the neighbouring parish of Latchingdon. The parish boundary was adjusted in 1987 to bring Maylandsea entirely within Mayland parish.

== Governance ==
There are three tiers of local government covering Mayland, at parish, district, and county level: Mayland Parish Council, Maldon District Council, and Essex County Council. The parish council meets at Lawling Park Hall on Katonia Avenue.

== Local amenities ==
There are two public house/restaurants: "Blackwater Bar & Bistro", situated adjacent to the Blackwater Marina, and "Hardy's". There are two sailing clubs; Maylandsea Bay Sailing Club, situated near the boat yard & Bistro and the Harlow (Blackwater) Sailing Club, accessed via North Drive, Mayland. The sea wall walk is enjoyed by locals and many visiting ramblers' groups.

The boatyard, originally Cardnells Boatyard, was involved in building motor torpedo boats (MTBs) in the Second World War.

The present local primary school is Maylandsea County Primary School, in Katonia Avenue. It was built when increased development in Maylandsea and Lower Mayland made it impractical to transport the children to either Mayland & Althorne County Primary School, Southminster Road, Upper Mayland, or to Latchingdon C. of E. Primary school in the nearby village of Latchingdon.

Along Imperial Avenue, Maylandsea, there is a small shopping area serving the community; including (in 2017) a combined supermarket and Post Office; a bakery; general store; card shop; two hairdressers/barber's/beauty salon; dog grooming parlour; fish and chip shop; a second food outlet; pharmacy and a charity shop;.

On Steeple Road, Mayland, the award-winning Indian restaurant "Zara" can be found in the converted old farm workers' cottages near the junction of Steeple Road and Grange Avenue, Mayland. Although the restaurant (previously a pub) has been known as "The Mayland Mill" for many years, this is not the site of the actual windmill. The Mayland post-mill, thought to have been built in 1817, was known for many years as Cardnell's Mill, as apparently George Cardnell occupied it from 1863 to 1899. The site of the windmill was in a field opposite Mill Road, Mayland, therefore further along the Steeple Road and on the opposite side. Although the mill was demolished many years ago, the mill house still remains as a residential property.

The Henry Samuel Hall on Steeple Road, Mayland, has a fascinating history linked to the American philanthropist Joseph Fels and The Back to the Land Movement. This is still being researched, but it is known the hall was brought to Mayland from a site in Kingsway, London in 1908, arranged by Fel's agricultural smallholdings manager Thomas Smith, to be used as a temporary school for the children of the farmers and agricultural workers.

There is also a local paper known as The Maylands Mayl which is a useful source of information for in and around the area.

== Local interest ==
There are always fossils to be found in Maylandsea, the most common being lobster fragments. There is a crashed P51B Mustang from World War II near Lawling Creek.
