= Dengie =

Village in Essex, England

Coordinates: 51°40′43″N 0°52′18″E

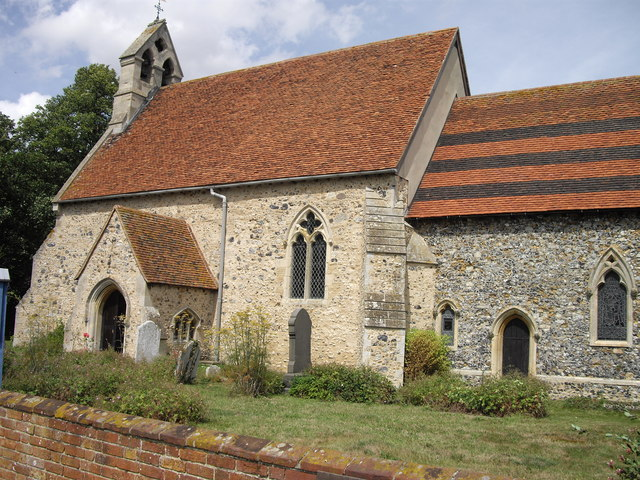
- St James' Church, Dengie

- Location within Essex
- Population: 116 (Parish, 2021)
- OS grid reference: TL986016
- District: Maldon
- Shire county: Essex
- Region: East
- Country: England
- Sovereign state: United Kingdom
- Post town: Southminster
- Postcode district: CM0
- Police: Essex
- Fire: Essex
- Ambulance: East of England

Dengie /ˈdɛndʒiː/ is a scattered village and civil parish in the Maldon district of Essex, England. It is about 2 1/2 miles (4.0 km) of the nearest town (and railway station), Southminster, on the slightly higher ground to the north of Dengie Marshes. Dengie nature reserve is about 3 miles (4.8 km) to the north-east. At the 2021 census the parish had a population of 116. The parish shares a grouped parish council with the neighbouring parish of Asheldham.

It gives its name to the Dengie peninsula and hundred and to the Dengie Special Protection Area.

The place-name "Dengie" is first attested in a manuscript of between 709 and 745, where it appears as Deningei. It appears as Daneseia in the Domesday Book of 1086. The name may mean "Dene's island" or "the island of Dene's people". Alternatively, it may derive from Old English Dænninga + ēg, "marshland occupied by the Dænningas-folk", Dænningas being a demonym based on dænn ‘woodland pasture for swine’. However, Margaret Gelling has noted that dænn is unlikely to appear in placenames in Essex, usually being restricted to the Weald area of Kent and Sussex. Instead, this element may derive from denu in its archaic sense of "low, flat space", referring to the nearby now-reclaimed marshlands.

The 14th-century church of St James is the parish church.

Dengie Flats, offshore, was used as a bombing and strafing range by the RAF and USAAF during the Second World War, and also attracted many crash-landing aircraft bound to or from the nearby RAF Bradwell Bay airfield. Between 1942 and 1945, Dengie was also the site of a 10-cm Coast Defence radar station used to warn of enemy ships, low-flying aircraft and doodlebugs.

Dengie Marshes were once used to film an episode of Doctor Who.

== See also ==
- Dengie Hundred
