= Asheldham =

Village in Essex, England

Coordinates: 51.6742°N 0.8464°E

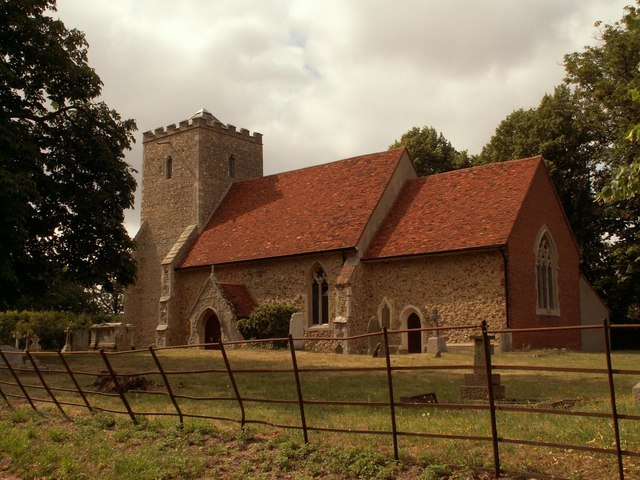
- St. Lawrence's church, Asheldham

- Location within Essex
- Population: 199 (Parish, 2021)
- OS grid reference: TL969011
- Civil parish: Asheldham
- District: Maldon
- Shire county: Essex
- Region: East
- Country: England
- Sovereign state: United Kingdom
- Post town: SOUTHMINSTER
- Postcode district: CM0
- Dialling code: 01621
- Police: Essex
- Fire: Essex
- Ambulance: East of England
- UK Parliament: Maldon & East Chelmsford

Asheldham is a village and civil parish in Essex, England. It is located about 14 km (8.7 mi) southeast of Maldon and is 26 km (16 mi) east-southeast from the county town of Chelmsford. The village is in the district of Maldon and the parliamentary constituency of Maldon & East Chelmsford. At the 2021 census the parish had a population of 199. The parish shares a grouped parish council with the neighbouring parish of Dengie.

It is on the Dengie peninsula, and is about 12 miles by road from Maldon. The former parish church, dedicated to St Lawrence became redundant in May 1973 and was converted into use as a youth church and residential centre for the Chelmsford Diocese. With a chancel, nave and tower dating from the 1300s, it is a Grade II listed building.

A Ham class minesweeper, HMS Asheldham, launched in September 1953 was named after the hamlet.

Archeological excavations into Romano-British field systems, Anglo-Saxon graves and medieval buildings have taken place in the village.
