= Dengie Peninsula =

Peninsula in Essex, England

Coordinates: 51°44′N 0°56′E

Dengie (pronounced with a soft 'g') is a peninsula in Essex, England, that once formed a hundred of the same name (sometimes spelled Dengy). The peninsula is formed by the River Crouch to the south, the Blackwater to the north, both of which are tidal, and the North Sea to the east. The eastern part of the peninsula is marshy and forms the Dengie Marshes.

The western boundary of Dengie hundred ran from North Fambridge to a bit west of Maldon. The peninsula forms about half of the Maldon local government district.

Places on the peninsula are:

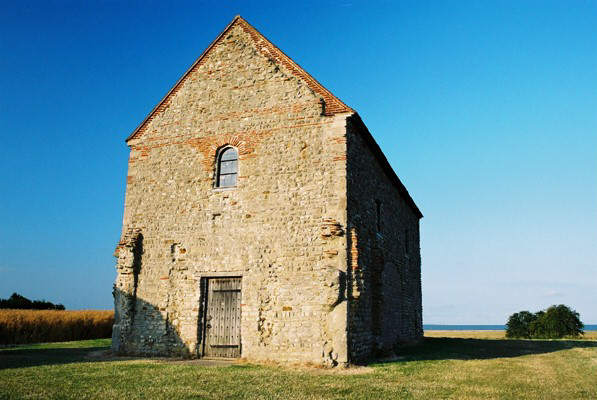
St. Peter-on-the-Wall Chapel, at the tip of the peninsula, and on the site of the Roman Saxon Shore fort of Othona

- Althorne
- Asheldham
- Bradwell-on-Sea
- Bradwell Waterside
- Burnham-on-Crouch
- Cold Norton
- Creeksea
- Dengie (village)
- Hazeleigh
- Langford
- Latchingdon
- Maldon
- Mayland
- Maylandsea
- Mundon
- North Fambridge
- Ostend
- Purleigh
- Ramsey Island
- Snoreham
- Southminster
- Steeple
- Stow Maries
- St Lawrence Bay
- Tillingham
- Woodham Mortimer
- Woodham Walter

== Farming ==
The soil on the Dengie Peninsula is very rich. The area usually has mild winters.

The Dengie Peninsula is home to some of the oldest and largest vineyards in the UK, including:

- Clayhill Vineyard
- New Hall Vineyard

== See also ==
- Dengie SPA
