= Dengie nature reserve =

Nature reserve in Essex, England

Coordinates: 51.683°N 0.948°E

Dengie
- Site of Special Scientific Interest
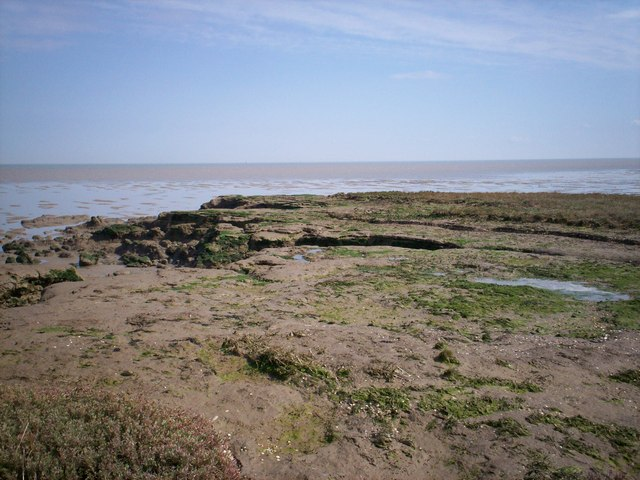
- Tillingham Marshes
- Location of Dengie.
- Area of search: Essex
- Grid reference: TM045030
- Interest: Biological; Geological
- Area: 12 sq. mi. (3105.0 hectares)
- Notification date: 1986
- Location map: Magic Map

Designations

Ramsar Wetland
- Official name: Dengie
- Designated: 24 March 1994
- Reference no.: 651

Dengie nature reserve is a 12 sq. mi. (3,105 hectare) biological and geological Site of Special Scientific Interest between the estuaries of the Blackwater and Crouch near Bradwell-on-Sea in Essex. It is also a National Nature Reserve, a Special Protection Area, a Nature Conservation Review site, a Geological Conservation Review site and a Ramsar site. It is part of the Essex estuaries Special Area of Conservation. An area of 30 acres (12 hectares) is the Bradwell Shell Bank nature reserve, which is managed by the Essex Wildlife Trust.

It consists of large, remote area of tidal mud-flats and salt marshes at the eastern end of the Dengie peninsula . The Chapel of St Peter-on-the-Wall overlooks some of the site.

It is a wetland of international importance and provides habitats for:

- Bar-tailed godwit (Limosa lapponica)
- Hen harrier (Circus cyaneus)
- Grey plover (Pluvialis squatarola)
- Red knot (Calidris canutus)
- Black-tailed godwit (Limosa limosa islandica)
- Dunlin (Calidris alpina alpina)
- Northern lapwing (Vanellus vanellus)
- Oystercatcher (Haematopus ostralegus)
- Dark-bellied brent goose (Branta bernicla bernicla)
- Cormorant (Phalacrocorax carbo)
- Great crested grebe (Podiceps cristatus)
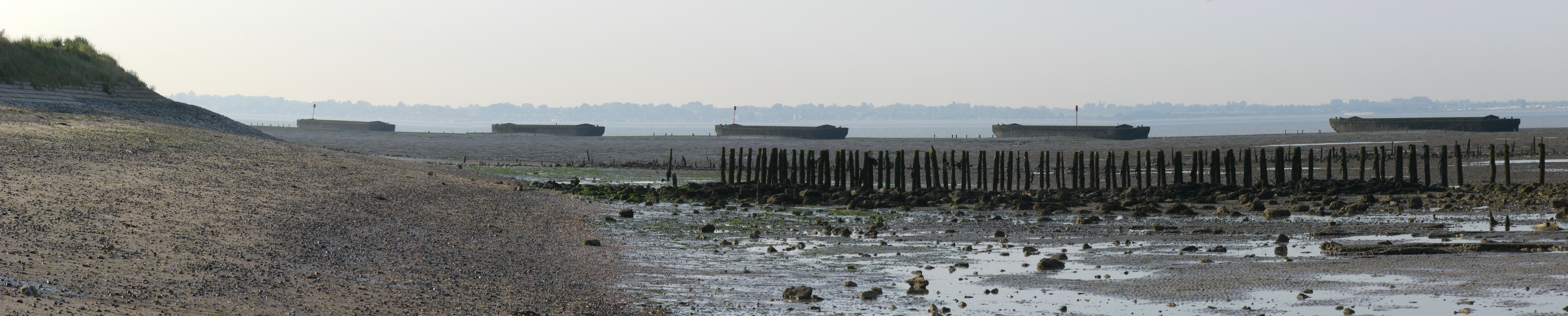
Sunken barges used as a breakwater, in the northern part of the SPA
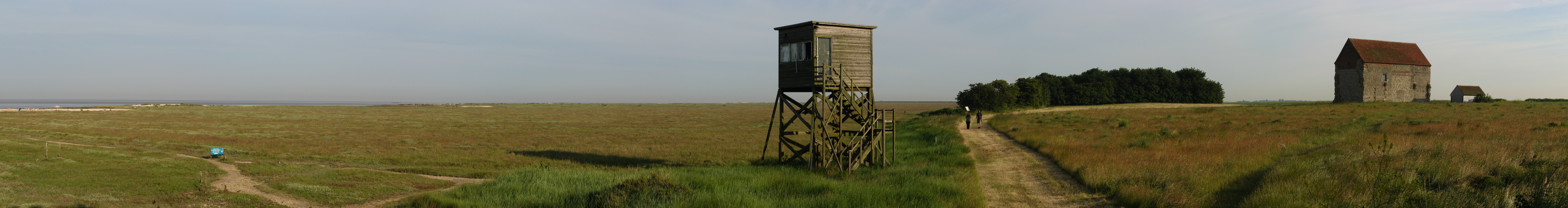
View southward near the Chapel of St Peter-on-the-Wall
