= Latchingdon =

Village in Essex, England

Coordinates: 51.671278°N 0.726128°E

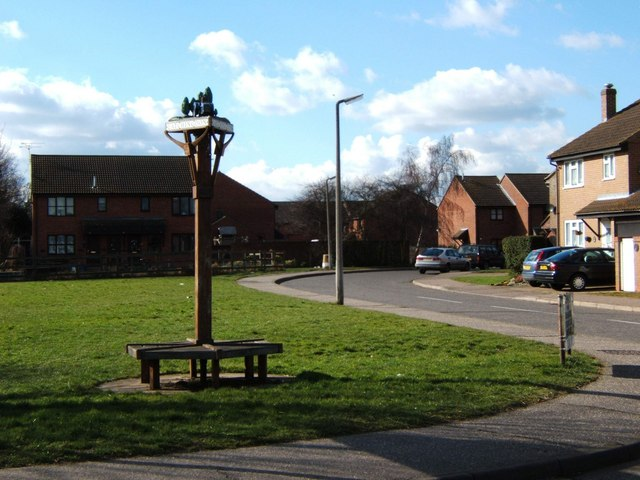
- The village sign at Latchingdon. The street in the background is Buchanan Way.

- Location within Essex
- Population: 1,407 (Parish, 2021)
- OS grid reference: TL885005
- District: Maldon
- Shire county: Essex
- Region: East
- Country: England
- Sovereign state: United Kingdom
- Post town: Chelmsford
- Postcode district: CM3
- Dialling code: 01621
- Police: Essex
- Fire: Essex
- Ambulance: East of England
- UK Parliament: Maldon and East Chelmsford

Latchingdon is a village situated on the Dengie Peninsula in Essex, England, south of the city of Chelmsford. The parish was at one time called Latchingdon-cum-Snoreham, and Snoreham Hall still exists to the south of Latchingdon. At the 2021 census the parish had a population of 1,407.

The place-name 'Latchingdon' is first attested in 1065 in a charter later published in the Diplomatarium anglicum edited by Benjamin Thorpe, where it appears as Laecedune. It appears in the Domesday Book of 1086 as Lacenduna, Lachenduna and Lessenduna. The name may derive from an unrecorded Old English word *læcce from the verb læccan to catch, meaning a trap, and related to the modern word 'latch'. The name would then mean 'hill with a trap', presumably to catch animals.

== Churches ==
The village's Christ Church, built in 1857, features an Essex bell-cote.

St Michael's Church was built in late 13th century, but its use was limited once Christ Church was built in the centre of the village due to its increasing population. St Michael's was kept as a mortuary chapel until it was deconsecrated in the late 1950s. In 1968 it was named as the first of 100 Essex churches to be disposed of by the Church of England. In 1976 it was converted to a private house.

A Congregational Church was also built in the village, but it closed and is now also a private house.

== Latchingdon and Snoreham Poor ==
Under the Poor Law of 1834, Latchingdon and Snoreham became part of the Maldon Union.

== Parish Council ==
Latchingdon Parish Council meets monthly at Latchingdon village hall.
