= Dengie Hundred =

Former administrative division of Essex, England

Coordinates: 51.685°N 0.874°E

Dengie is a hundred in the county of Essex, England.

It corresponded to the Dengie peninsula, with the inland, western boundary running from North Fambridge to just west of Maldon. It was known at the time of Domesday as Witbrictesherna (Wibrihtesherne) Hundred until the hundred court changed its meeting location.

== See also ==
- Hundreds of Essex
