= Southminster =

Town in Essex, England

Coordinates: 51.6598°N 0.831°E

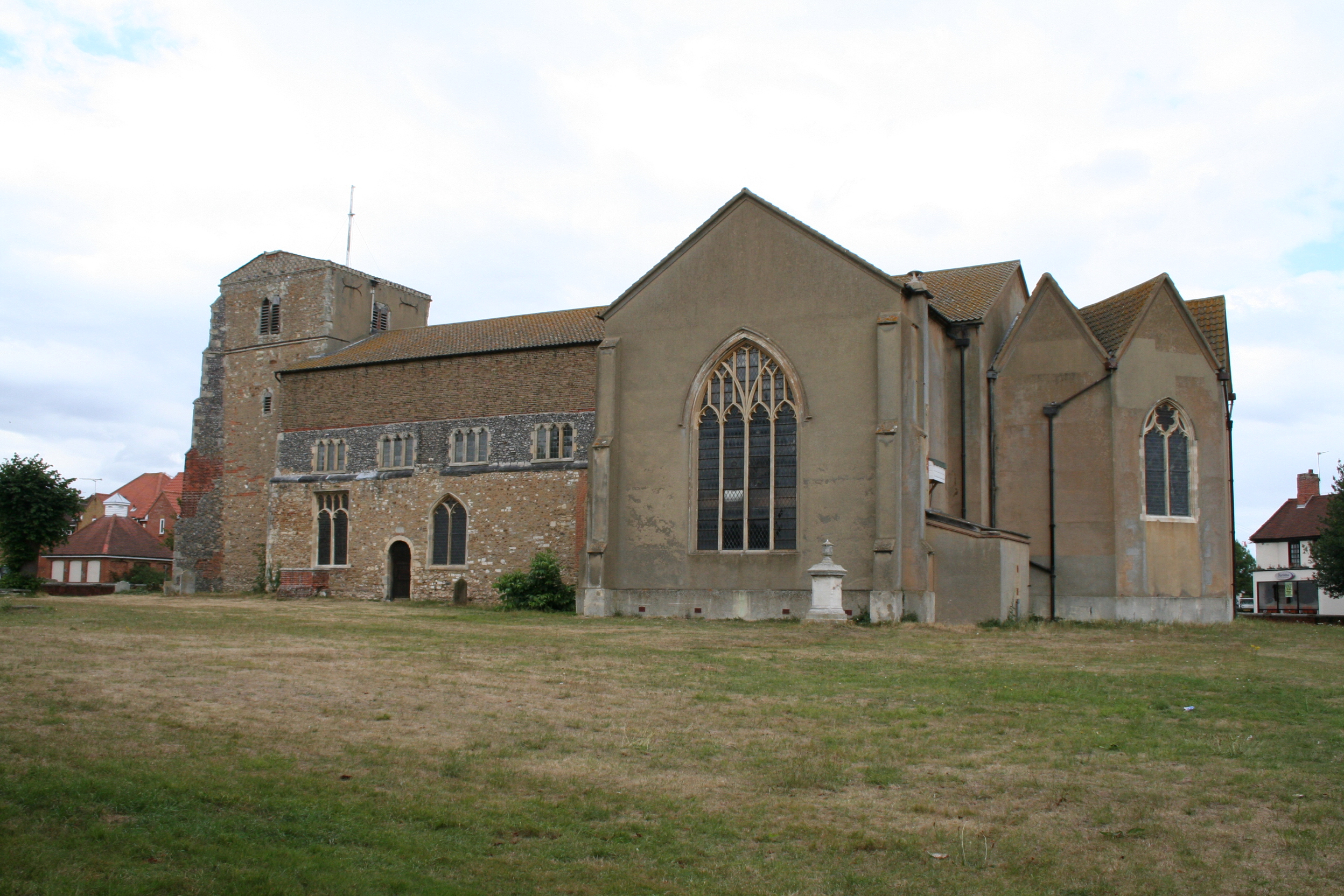
- St Leonard's, Southminster

- Location within Essex
- Population: 4,828 (Parish, 2021)
- OS grid reference: TQ961995
- District: Maldon
- Shire county: Essex
- Region: East
- Country: England
- Sovereign state: United Kingdom
- Post town: SOUTHMINSTER
- Postcode district: CM0
- Dialling code: 01621
- Police: Essex
- Fire: Essex
- Ambulance: East of England
- UK Parliament: Maldon

Southminster is a town and civil parish on the Dengie Peninsula in the Maldon district of Essex in the East of England. It lies about 3 miles (4.8 km) north of Burnham-on-Crouch and 10 miles (16 km) south-east of Maldon; it is approximately 52 miles (84 km) east-north-east of London. To the north is the River Blackwater, which is tidal, and, since Roman times, has been the gateway to trading in the area. At the 2021 census the parish had a population of 4,828.

== Etymology ==
The village's name is basically similar in meaning to that of Westminster in London; from Old English Suðmynstre, meaning "south minster".

== History ==
Southminster is in the centre of the Dengie peninsula, which once formed a hundred of the same name.

A major horse market used to be held annually in the town.

Southminster marshes were a favourite centre for hare coursing in Victorian times.

Pandole Wood contains ancient earthworks believed to date from the Iron Age. The landscape surrounding the town, and elsewhere on the peninsula, is characterized by a pattern of strictly rectangular field boundaries, with evidence of a unit of measurement having been applied to the scheme as a whole. Middle Saxon administrations have been suggested as its origin, although the road to the Roman Saxon Shore fort of Othona at Bradwell-on-Sea also conforms to the pattern.

== St Leonard's Church ==
The medieval St Leonard's Church dates mainly from the 15th century, although there are traces of much earlier work, including from the 12th century. It is a relatively large, "townish" church by Essex standards. The church also stands at an important road junction, contrasting with the familiar Essex pattern of a church and manor house complex on the same site. These features are consistent with John Blair's formulation of an Anglo-Saxon minster, in contrast to a private oratory in its origins, and the place-name would perhaps suggest Cedd's mission at the Chapel of St Peter-on-the-Wall near Bradwell (to the north) as its parent. The church is a Grade II* listed building.

Several well-known clergymen are associated with the church, including naturalist Walter Henry Hill, curate from 1832 to 1839, and Alexander John Scott, rector 1805 to 1840 but previously personal chaplain to Horatio Nelson. After the Battle of Trafalgar Nelson died in the arms of Scott, and several artefacts that once belonged to Scott are found in the church.

There is also a brick-built United Reformed Church building in North Street, Southminster.

== Facilities ==
The town has a pre-school, infant and a primary school, a small library, a handful of pubs, a swimming pool, a brewery and cidery and one holiday park. The local football team - Southminster United F.C. play on the King George V Memorial Field.

== Transport ==
=== Railway ===
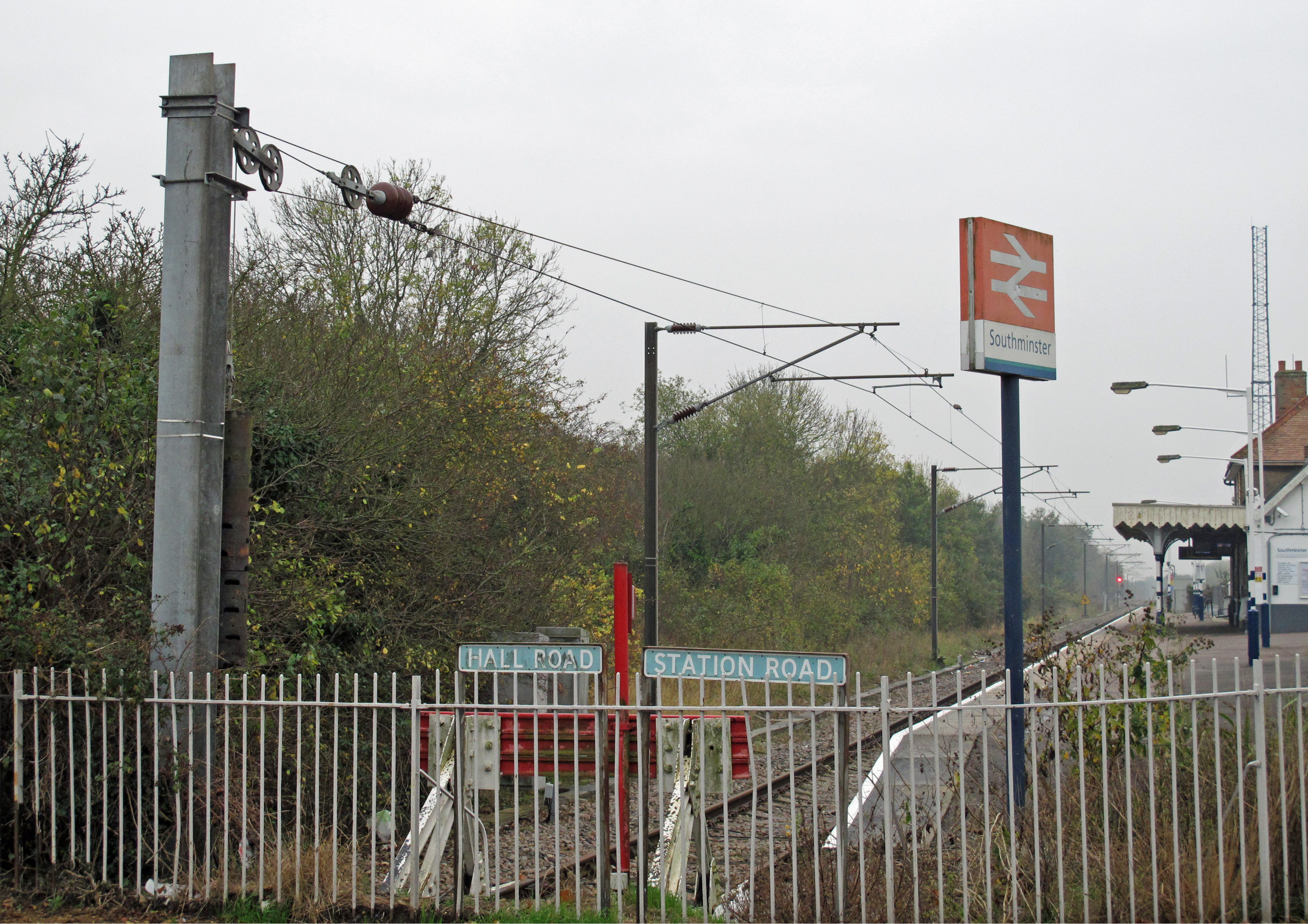
Southminster railway station in 2011

Southminster railway station is the northern terminus of the Crouch Valley line, which provides generally hourly stopping services to Wickford. Some early-morning peak services continue beyond Wickford to London Liverpool Street. Trains are operated by Greater Anglia.

The single-tracked line was electrified in the 1980s.

=== Buses ===
Bus services in Southminster are operated by First Essex, Hedingham & Chambers and Stephensons of Essex.

Routes include:

- 331 Chelmsford – Burnham on Crouch
- D2 Maldon – Southminster

== Location grid ==
Parishes adjacent to the Southminster parish:
