= Grade II* listed buildings in Maldon (district) =

There are over 20,000 Grade II* listed buildings in England. This page is a list of these buildings in the district of Maldon in Essex.

== Maldon ==
| Name | Location | Type | Completed (Note: The date given is the date used by Historic England as significant for the initial building or that of an important part in the structure's description.) | Date designated | Grid ref. (Note: Sometimes known as OSGB36, the grid reference is based on the British national grid reference system used by the Ordnance Survey.) Geo-coordinates | Entry number (Note: The "List Entry Number" is a unique number assigned to each listed building and scheduled monument by Historic England.) | Image |
|---|---|---|---|---|---|---|---|
| Parish Church of St Andrew | Althorne, Maldon | Parish Church | Late 14th century | 1 November 1953 | TQ9090398926; 51°39′24″N 0°45′31″E | 1110862 | Parish Church of St Andrew More images |
| Bradwell Hall | Bradwell-on-Sea, Maldon | House | 14th century | 10 January 1953 | TL9887505386; 51°42′43″N 0°52′38″E | 1147175 | Upload Photo |
| Bradwell Lodge | Bradwell-on-Sea, Maldon | Country House | c. 1785 | 10 January 1953 | TM0048806758; 51°43′25″N 0°54′05″E | 1337401 | Bradwell Lodge More images |
| Church of St Thomas | Bradwell-on-Sea, Maldon | Parish Church | 14th century | 30 December 1959 | TM0041606840; 51°43′28″N 0°54′01″E | 1308856 | Church of St Thomas More images |
| Church of St Mary the Virgin | Burnham-on-Crouch, Maldon | Church | 1733 | 10 November 1951 | TQ9486797034; 51°38′18″N 0°48′53″E | 1123763 | Church of St Mary the Virgin More images |
| Creeksea Place | Creeksea, Burnham-on-Crouch, Maldon | House | 16th century by 1569 | 10 November 1951 | TQ9344996163; 51°37′52″N 0°47′37″E | 1123776 | Creeksea Place More images |
| Royal Corinthian Yacht Club | Burnham-on-Crouch, Maldon | Sailing Club | 1930 | 28 January 1971 | TQ9543195416; 51°37′25″N 0°49′19″E | 1123772 | Royal Corinthian Yacht Club More images |
| Stow Maries WWI Airfield | Cold Norton, Maldon | Military Airfield | First World War | 26 April 2012 | TL8193300209; 51°40′16″N 0°37′47″E | 1406155 | Stow Maries WWI Airfield More images |
| Braxted Park | Great Braxted, Maldon | Country House | 17th century | 30 December 1959 | TL8549915344; 51°48′21″N 0°41′21″E | 1111110 | Braxted Park More images |
| Cave/Icehouse situated at North Western End of the Lake | Braxted Park, Great Braxted, Maldon | Game Larder | C18/C19 | 8 August 1985 | TL8508815647; 51°48′32″N 0°41′00″E | 1111072 | Upload Photo |
| Church of All Saints | Great Braxted, Maldon | Church | 12th century | 30 December 1959 | TL8509415439; 51°48′25″N 0°41′00″E | 1165777 | Church of All Saints More images |
| Tiptree Priory | Great Braxted, Maldon | Priory/House | c. 1570 | 7 May 1985 | TL8754214571; 51°47′54″N 0°43′06″E | 1166055 | Tiptree Priory More images |
| Church of St Peter | Great Totham, Maldon | Parish Church | 13th century or 14th century | 30 December 1959 | TL8619811021; 51°46′01″N 0°41′49″E | 1111050 | Church of St Peter More images |
| Great Ruffins | Beacon Hill, Great Totham, Maldon | House | c. 1904 | 8 August 1985 | TL8520912666; 51°46′55″N 0°41′01″E | 1111087 | Upload Photo |
| Mountains and Garden Wall attached to right | Great Totham, Maldon | Timber Framed House | C15/C16 | 8 August 1985 | TL8618112891; 51°47′01″N 0°41′52″E | 1337335 | Upload Photo |
| Church of St Giles | Langford, Maldon | Parish Church | C11/C12 | 30 December 1959 | TL8377309020; 51°44′59″N 0°39′39″E | 1166011 | Church of St Giles More images |
| Kitchen/dovecote, approximately 100 Metres North of Little Braxted Hall | Little Braxted, Maldon | Kitchen | 15th century | 30 December 1959 | TL8353514808; 51°48′06″N 0°39′38″E | 1146757 | Upload Photo |
| Beeleigh Steam Mill and Bridge over Tail Race | Beeleigh, Maldon | Steam Mill and Bridge | Early 19th century | 24 September 1971 | TL8396908192; 51°44′32″N 0°39′48″E | 1257130 | Beeleigh Steam Mill and Bridge over Tail Race More images |
| Blue Boar Hotel | Maldon | House | Mid 19th century | 2 October 1951 | TL8490607084; 51°43′55″N 0°40′34″E | 1256381 | Blue Boar Hotel More images |
| Chandlers | Maldon | House | 17th century extension | 24 September 1971 | TL8493907110; 51°43′56″N 0°40′36″E | 1256387 | Upload Photo |
| No 2, London Road with Raised Forecourt and Boundary Walls | Maldon | House | Mid to late 18th century | 2 October 1951 | TL8478207028; 51°43′53″N 0°40′28″E | 1256575 | Upload Photo |
| Swan Hotel | Maldon | Hall House | Late 14th century | 2 October 1951 | TL8517807020; 51°43′53″N 0°40′48″E | 1256847 | Swan Hotel More images |
| Talbots | Maldon | House | Late 16th century or early 17th century | 24 September 1971 | TL8477907003; 51°43′53″N 0°40′28″E | 1256578 | Upload Photo |
| The Old Custom House | Maldon | House | Early 18th century | 2 October 1951 | TL8505507274; 51°44′01″N 0°40′43″E | 1256548 | Upload Photo |
| Vicarage of Church of All Saints | Maldon | Jettied House | Early 16th century to mid 16th century | 24 September 1971 | TL8496407114; 51°43′56″N 0°40′37″E | 1257084 | Vicarage of Church of All Saints More images |
| 1, 3 and 3a High Street | Maldon | Apartment | C20 | 4 August 1971 | TL8483007022; 51°43′53″N 0°40′30″E | 1256956 | Upload Photo |
| 69 and 71 High Street | Maldon | Jettied House | 16th century | 2 October 1951 | TL8515307029; 51°43′53″N 0°40′47″E | 1256844 | 69 and 71 High Street |
| 90, 92 and 94 High Street | Maldon | Open Hall House | 15th century | 24 September 1971 | TL8517106992; 51°43′52″N 0°40′48″E | 1256860 | Upload Photo |
| 160, 160a, 162, 164 High Street | Maldon | Shops | C20 | 24 September 1971 | TL8546406832; 51°43′46″N 0°41′03″E | 1256809 | 160, 160a, 162, 164 High Street More images |
| White House Farmhouse | Mundon | Farmhouse | c. 1570 | 30 May 1986 | TL8767503683; 51°42′02″N 0°42′52″E | 1168535 | White House Farmhouse More images |
| Church of St Leonard | Southminster, Maldon | Parish Church | 12th century | 30 December 1959 | TQ9585199696; 51°39′43″N 0°49′49″E | 1264082 | Church of St Leonard More images |
| Parish Church of St Mary | Stow Maries, Maldon | Parish Church | 14th century | 1 November 1953 | TQ8336299386; 51°39′48″N 0°38′59″E | 1337436 | Parish Church of St Mary More images |
| Church of St Nicholas | Tillingham, Maldon | Parish Church | 12th century | 30 December 1959 | TL9932503831; 51°41′52″N 0°52′58″E | 1247743 | Church of St Nicholas More images |
| Stows Farmhouse | Tillingham, Maldon | Jettied House | 15th century | 5 August 1986 | TL9883603572; 51°41′44″N 0°52′32″E | 1247749 | Upload Photo |
| Bourchier's Hall | Tollesbury, Maldon | House | 16th century | 10 January 1953 | TL9443011658; 51°46′11″N 0°48′59″E | 1141665 | Upload Photo |
| Church of St Mary the Virgin | Tollesbury, Maldon | Parish Church | Late 11th century | 30 December 1959 | TL9563910370; 51°45′28″N 0°50′00″E | 1328624 | Church of St Mary the Virgin More images |
| Tollesbury Hall | Tollesbury, Maldon | Cross Wing House | Before 15th century | 10 January 1953 | TL9565110341; 51°45′27″N 0°50′00″E | 1141670 | Upload Photo |
| Tolleshunt D'Arcy Hall | Tolleshunt D'Arcy, Maldon | House | Late 17th century | 10 January 1953 | TL9283711614; 51°46′12″N 0°47′36″E | 1142513 | Upload Photo |
| Bridge over Moat, 12 Metres South of Tolleshunt D'Arcy Hall | Tolleshunt D'Arcy, Maldon | Moat | 1585 | 10 January 1953 | TL9282011584; 51°46′11″N 0°47′35″E | 1142514 | Upload Photo |
| Dovecote approx. 35 Metres North East of Tolleshunt D'Arcy Hall | Tolleshunt D'Arcy, Maldon | Dovecote | Late 16th century | 10 January 1953 | TL9285411649; 51°46′13″N 0°47′37″E | 1323172 | Upload Photo |
| Church of All Saints | Tolleshunt Knights, Maldon | Parish Church | 12th century | 30 December 1959 | TL9269513863; 51°47′25″N 0°47′33″E | 1121938 | Church of All Saints More images |
| Gatehouse 40 Metres West of Beckingham Hall | Tolleshunt Major, Maldon | Courtyard | 1543-6 | 30 December 1959 | TL9093411252; 51°46′03″N 0°45′56″E | 1142526 | Gatehouse 40 Metres West of Beckingham Hall More images |
| Highams Farmhouse | Tolleshunt Major, Maldon | Dairy | 18th century | 5 February 1987 | TL9119509344; 51°45′01″N 0°46′06″E | 1337678 | Upload Photo |
| Church of All Saints | Ulting, Maldon | Parish Church | 13th century | 30 December 1959 | TL8013408767; 51°44′55″N 0°36′29″E | 1111002 | Church of All Saints More images |
| Ulting Hall | Ulting, Maldon | Manor House | Late 18th century or early 19th century | 10 January 1953 | TL8111409104; 51°45′05″N 0°37′21″E | 1337355 | Upload Photo |
| Blue Mills | Wickham Hill, Wickham Bishops, Maldon | Watermill | Early 19th century | 1 March 1950 | TL8305713140; 51°47′13″N 0°39′10″E | 1122562 | Blue Mills More images |
| Church of St Peter | Wickham Bishops, Maldon | Parish Church | Disused | 14 November 1985 | TL8248811207; 51°46′11″N 0°38′36″E | 1111019 | Church of St Peter More images |
| Mathyns | Wickham Hill, Wickham Bishops, Maldon | House | 1950 | 1 March 1950 | TL8308013134; 51°47′13″N 0°39′11″E | 1169879 | Upload Photo |
| Wickham Place | Wickham Bishops, Maldon | House | Later extensions | 30 November 1959 | TL8232411755; 51°46′29″N 0°38′29″E | 1337357 | Upload Photo |
| Nursery Farmhouse | Woodham Mortimer, Maldon | House | Early 18th century | 30 December 1959 | TL8122204380; 51°42′32″N 0°37′18″E | 1146691 | Upload Photo |
| Church of St Michael | Woodham Walter, Maldon | Bell Tower | 19th century | 30 December 1959 | TL8089506707; 51°43′48″N 0°37′05″E | 1110960 | Church of St Michael More images |
| West Bowers Hall | Woodham Walter, Maldon | House | Later | 10 January 1953 | TL7979407686; 51°44′21″N 0°36′09″E | 1308604 | West Bowers Hall More images |
