= Bradwell Lodge =

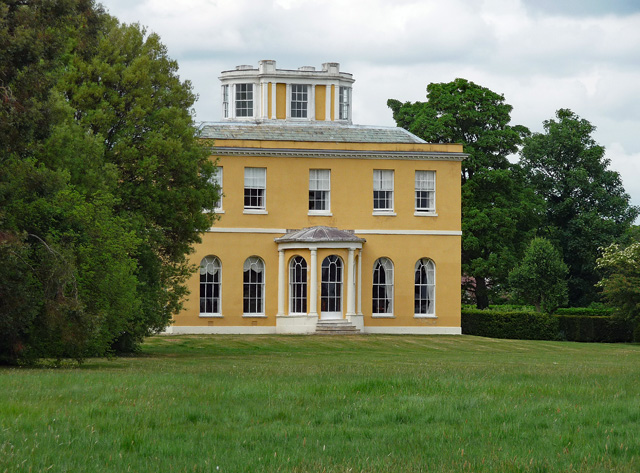

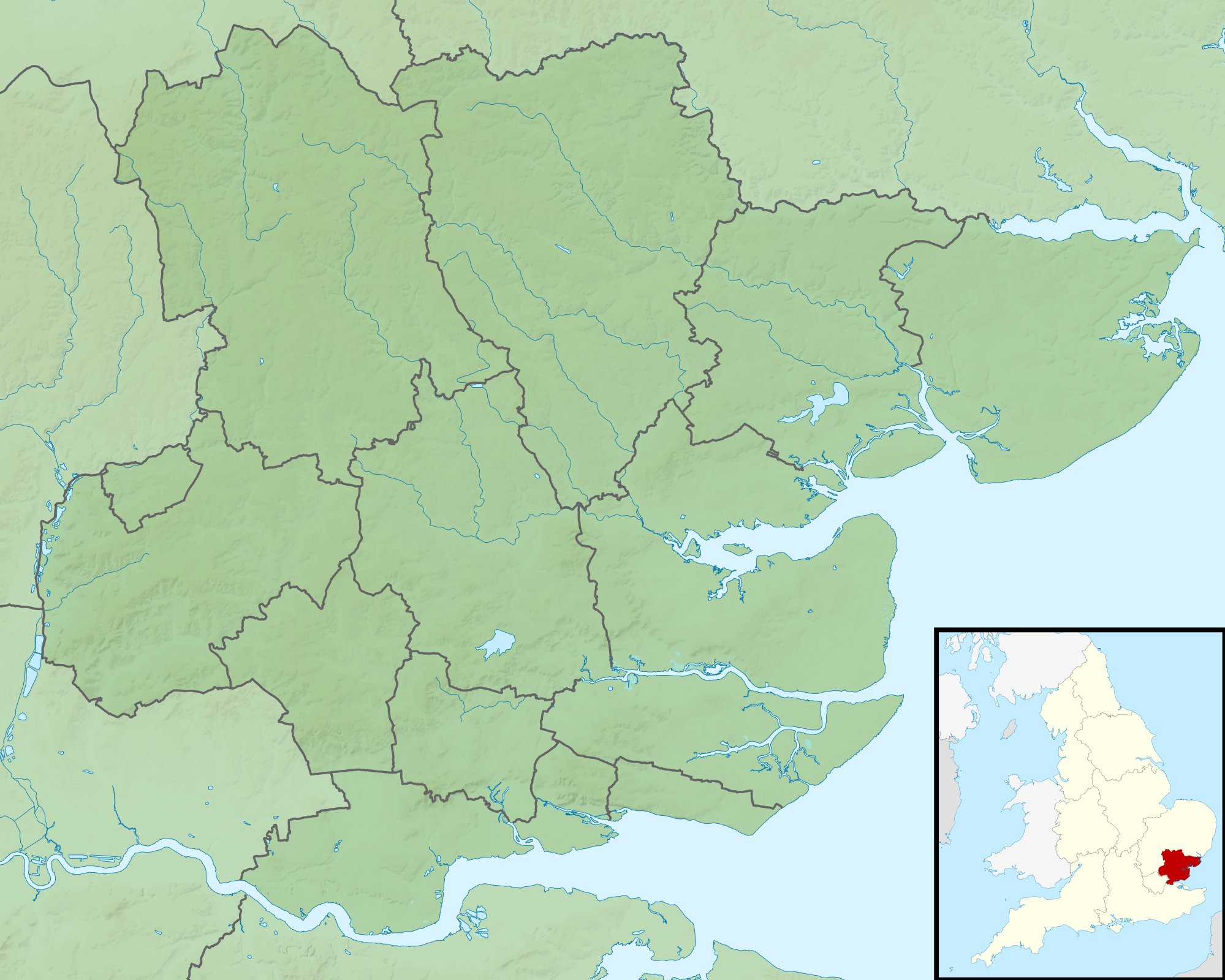
- Location within Essex
- 51.7237°N 0.9014°E
- Type: House
- Location: Bradwell-on-Sea, Essex

History
- Built: Tudor, Neoclassical extension c. 1785, 21st century portico

Site notes
- Architect(s): John Johnson, 18th century, Quinlan Terry, 21st century
- Governing body: Privately owned

Listed Building – Grade II*
- Official name: Bradwell Lodge
- Designated: 10 January 1953
- Reference no.: 1337401

Listed Building – Grade II
- Official name: Former Coach House and Stables 30M north of Bradwell Lodge
- Designated: 5 August 1986
- Reference no.: 1308762

Listed Building – Grade II
- Official name: Walled Garden 50M northeast of Bradwell Lodge
- Designated: 7 December 1977
- Reference no.: 1110944

Bradwell Lodge is a country house in the village of Bradwell-on-Sea, on the Dengie Peninsula in Essex, England. Originally a Tudor rectory, in the 18th century the house was purchased by the Reverend Sir Henry Bate Dudley. Bate Dudley engaged John Johnson, Surveyor of the County of Essex, to build a large Neoclassical extension. In the 20th century, the lodge was the home of the local MP, Tom Driberg. Bradwell remains a private residence. It is a Grade II* listed building.

== History ==
Bradwell Lodge stands close to the Church of St Thomas in the village of Bradwell-on-Sea. The origins of the house are a moated manor house dating from Tudor times. (Note: Historic England, in their listing record for the lodge, give a rather imprecise date for the original construction of the 15th or 16th centuries.) By the 18th century the lodge had become the village rectory. In the later half of that century, the lodge was bought by the Reverend Sir Henry Bate Dudley (1745-1824), a Church of England minister. (Note: The name, Bate Dudley, is sometimes hyphenated to Bate-Dudley.) In addition to his religious duties, Bate Dudley edited one newspaper, the Morning Post and ran another, the Morning Herald, courting controversy and enduring imprisonment as the "most notorious editor in London." He wrote plays and was a close friend of both the actor David Garrick and the artist Thomas Gainsborough, who twice painted his portrait. He was also a famous duellist, gaining the nickname, "The Fighting Parson". (Note: In 1781 Bate Dudley was imprisoned for a year for libelling the Duke of Richmond.)

Between 1781 and 1786 Bate Dudley engaged John Johnson (1732-1814) to embellish the original manor house with a large extension to the south side. Johnson held the post of Surveyor of the County of Essex and was a prolific architect of country houses and public buildings throughout the county, as well as a number of aristocratic townhouses in London.

In 1939, the lodge was purchased by Tom Driberg. (Note: The lodge had previously been viewed, and rejected, by the American socialite and politician Henry “Chips” Channon.) Driberg had made his name as the gossip columnist William Hickey in the Daily Express and in 1942 was elected member of parliament for Maldon, the Essex constituency in which Bradwell Lodge was sited. The house was unavailable to him during the Second World War as it was requisitioned by the Royal Air Force to serve as an officers' mess for the nearby RAF Bradwell Bay. Driberg returned to the lodge after the war and brought his new wife, Ena Mary Binfield, there in 1951. Their marriage had surprised Driberg's friends and connections as he was openly homosexual; some suspected that the partnership was in part to provide cover for his sexual orientation, as well as a chatelaine for his substantial country house. (Note: On seeing a photograph of Ena at the time of the couple's engagement, Winston Churchill is reported to have remarked; "buggers can't be choosers".) (Note: On another occasion Churchill, not usually given to censoriousness, described Driberg as “the sort of man who gives sodomy a bad name.”)

The grounds contain a rare Ginkgo biloba tree presented to Driberg when Chairman of the Labour Party by the Premier of the People's Republic of China, Zhou Enlai. In 1976 Driberg was elevated to the peerage as Baron Bradwell of Bradwell juxta Mare in the County of Essex. He died three weeks later and is buried in the graveyard of St Thomas's Church, near to the lodge. Bradwell Lodge remains a private residence, and has been sold on a number of occasions in the 21st century.

== Architecture and description ==
Bradwell Lodge is formed of two main structures, the remnant of the original Tudor manor house, and the 18th-century block added by Bate Dudley. The former is a two-storey building of timber and brick. The latter is again of two-storeys but of a "clearly metropolitan" Neoclassical style. The interior contains decoration in the style of Angelica Kaufman and other elements were undertaken by Robert Smirke. John Bettley, in his 2007 Essex volume of the Pevsner Buildings of England series, also notes the traditional attribution of parts of the interior design scheme to Robert Adam but states that there is no documentary evidence to support the claim. A portico on the south front was added by Quinlan Terry in 2005. The Georgian extension is topped with a belvedere.

Bradwell Lodge is a Grade II* listed building. The walled garden and the former coach house and stables are listed Grade II.

== Sources ==
- Bettley, James; Pevsner, Nikolaus (2007). Essex. The Buildings of England. New Haven, US and London: Yale University Press. ISBN 978-0-300-11614-4. OCLC 1042848015.
- Channon, Henry (2021). Simon Heffer (ed.). Henry "Chips" Channon - The Diaries: 1918-1938. London: Hutchinson. ISBN 978-1-786-33181-6. OCLC 1130667674.
- Colvin, Howard (1978). A Biographical Dictionary of British Architects 1600-1840. London, UK: John Murray. ISBN 978-0-719-53328-0.
- Plater, Jill (2008). "Bradwell Lodge (formerly the rectory)" (PDF). Essex Gardens Trust.
- Reynolds, Peter (2019). The Children of Harvey Milk: How LGBTQ Politicians Changed the World. Oxford: Oxford University Press. ISBN 978-0-190-46095-2.
