= Sir Henry Dudley, 1st Baronet =

British clergyman, magistrate and playwright

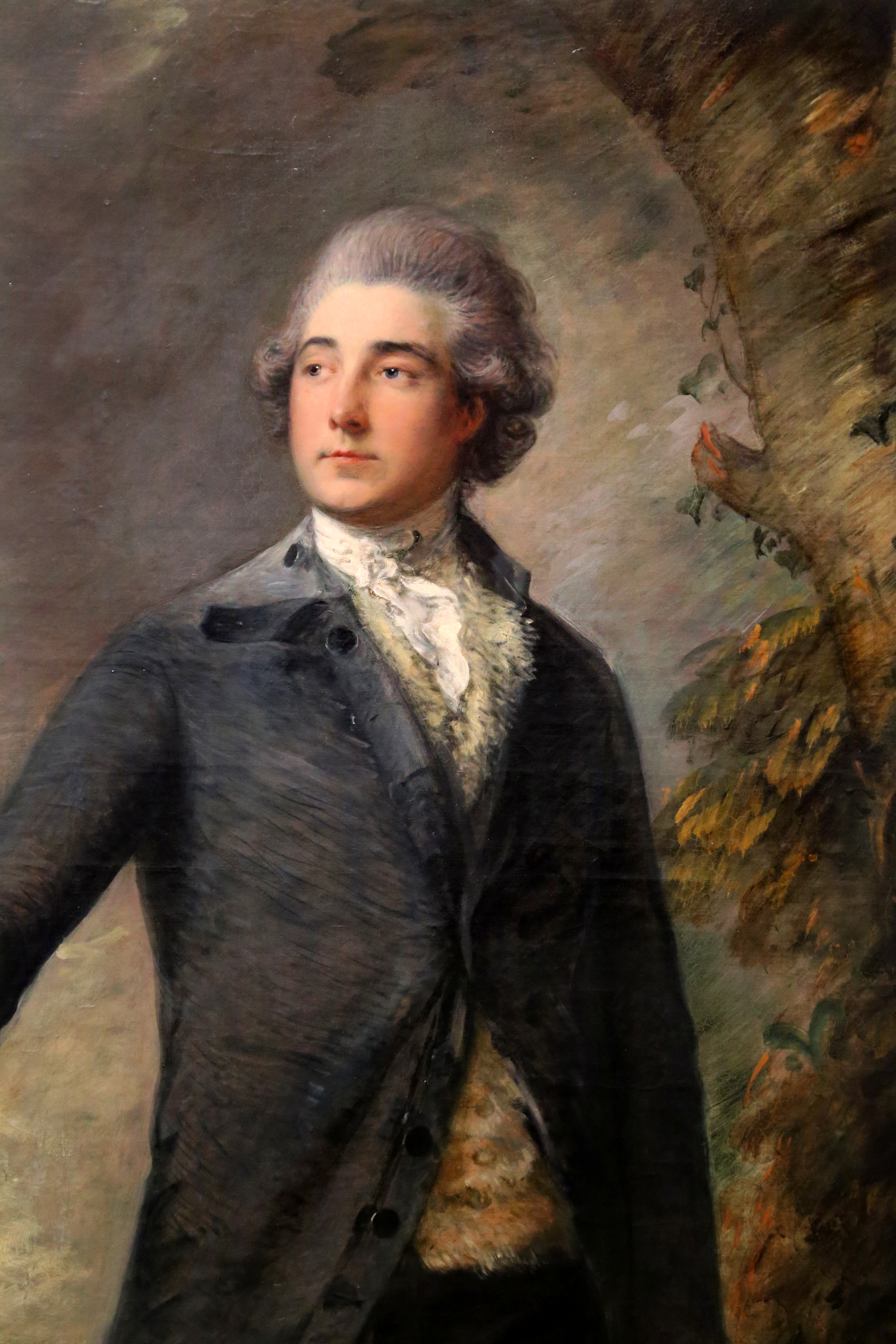
Henry Bate Dudley by Thomas Gainsborough, cropped from full length, circa 1780

Sir Henry Bate Dudley, 1st Baronet (25 August 1745 – 1 February 1824) was a British clergyman, magistrate and playwright.

He was born in Fenny Compton, Warwickshire, but in 1763 his father moved the family to Essex to take up a rectory at North Fambridge near Chelmsford. He was educated at Magdalen College, Oxford and ordained a priest of the Church of England in 1768. On his father's death, Bate Dudley took over the benefice. In Essex, he owned Bradwell Lodge, a Tudor country house near Bradwell-on-Sea and engaged the architect John Johnson to construct a large extension attached to the south side of the original house, designed in a Neoclassical style.

In addition to his religious duties, Bate Dudley edited one newspaper, The Morning Post and in 1780 founded another, the Morning Herald, courting controversy and enduring imprisonment as the "most notorious editor in London."

He wrote plays and was a close friend of both the actor David Garrick and the artist Thomas Gainsborough, who twice painted his portrait. He was also a famous duellist, gaining the nickname, "The Fighting Parson". In 1781 Bate Dudley was imprisoned for a year for libelling the Duke of Richmond.

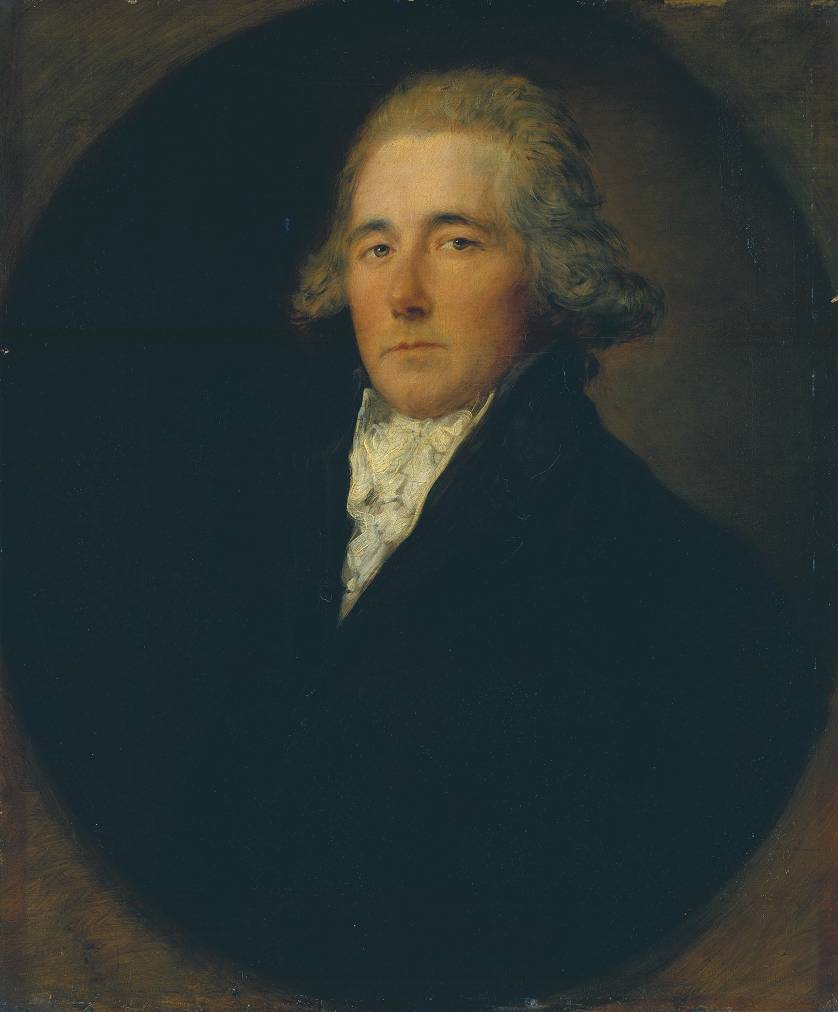
Henry Bate Dudley by Thomas Gainsborough, circa 1780

Bate Dudley was a great supporter of, and chronicled the life of the artist Thomas Gainsborough . Much of this work was published in the Morning Herald which Bate Dudley owned and ran, and The Morning Post with which he was also associated but had left to set up the Herald after a disagreement in 1780. Much of this was republished in 1915 in Life of Gainsborough by William Whitley.

After meeting James Townley and being influenced by his farce High Life Below Stairs Bate Dudley started writing scripts for comic operas. Following his The Rival Candidates, his libretto for The Flitch of Bacon (1778) was the first of his collaboration with the composer William Shield, whom he assisted in bringing to prominence. The Shield and Dudley operas also included The Woodman (1791) and Travellers in Switzerland (1794), and were produced at Covent Garden.

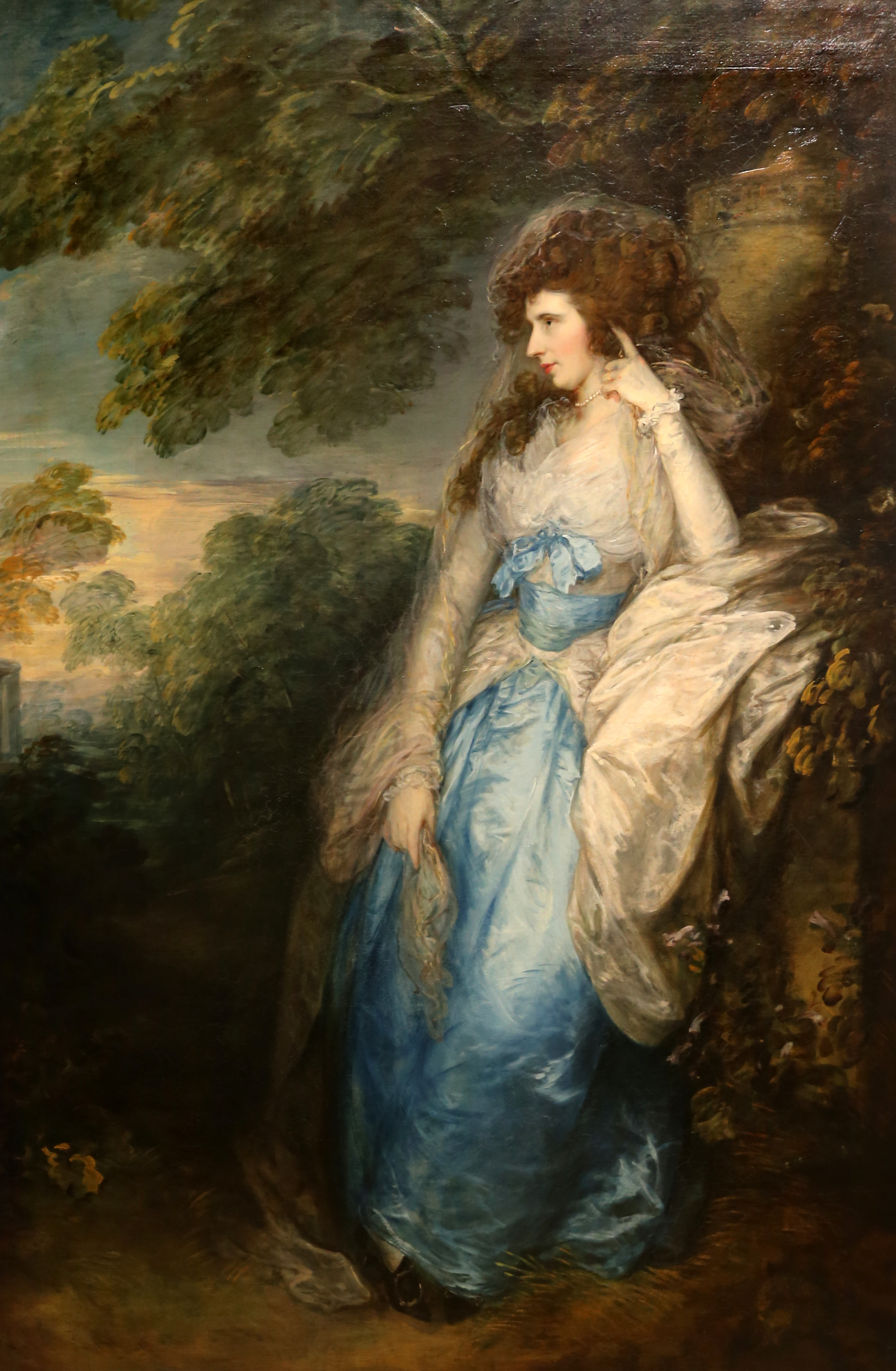
Thomas Gainsborough, Lady Bate-Dudley, 1787

For a time, between 1804 and 1812, Bate Dudley moved from Essex to Ireland due to financial difficulties and took up a rectory in Kilscoran and Kilglass. He returned to England in 1812 to take up a rectory in Willingham, Cambridgeshire. In October of the same year he was created a baronet, of Sloane Street, Chelsea, in the County of Middlesex, and of Kilscoran House in the County of Wexford.

Bate Dudley played a part in the suppression of the Ely and Littleport riots 1816. These were part of a more widespread discontent which affected Norfolk, Suffolk, Huntingdonshire and Cambridgeshire. It had its roots in discontent over the enclosure of the fenlands, but the high price of bread, poor pay of agricultural workers, and unemployment of soldiers returning from the Napoleonic Wars were also factors. Bate Dudley, who was a magistrate at Ely at the time, organised opposition to the rioters at Littleport, near Ely, where the insurgents were defeated, but only after troops opened fire on them.

== Comic operas ==
- Sir Henry Bate Dudley, The Rival Candidates, 1775.
- William Shield, Sir Henry Bate Dudley, The Flitch of Bacon, 1779.
- William Shield, Sir Henry Bate Dudley, The Woodman, 1791.
- William Shield, Sir Henry Bate Dudley, Travellers in Switzerland, 1794.

== Bibliography ==
- s.n., "Obituary: Sir Henry Bate Dudley, Bart.", The Gentleman's magazine, pp. 273–276, 638–639, Vol. 135, 1824
- Edward Royle, Revolutionary Britannia?: reflections on the threat of revolution in Britain, 1789-1848, Manchester University Press, 2000 ISBN 0-7190-4803-6.
- William T. Whitley, Art of England 1821-1837, Read Books, 2007 ISBN 1-4067-5294-0.

Baronetage of the United Kingdom
| New creation | Baronet (of Sloane Street and Kilscoran House); 1812–1824 | Extinct |
| Preceded by Anderson baronets | Dudley baronets of Sloane Street and Kilscoran House; 17 April 1813 | Succeeded by Jackson baronets |
