= Tom Driberg =

English journalist, politician and churchman (1905–1976)

The Right Honourable The Lord Bradwell
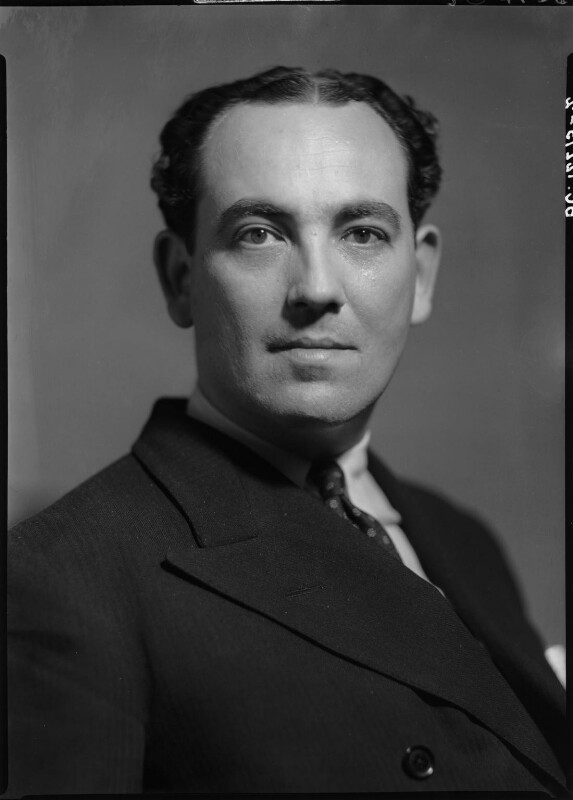
- Driberg in 1941

Chairman of the Labour Party
- In office 1957–1958
- Leader: Hugh Gaitskell
- Preceded by: Margaret Herbison
- Succeeded by: Barbara Castle

Member of Parliament for Maldon
- In office 25 June 1942 – 6 May 1955
- Preceded by: Sir Edward Ruggles-Brise
- Succeeded by: Alastair Harrison

Member of Parliament for Barking
- In office 8 October 1959 – 8 February 1974
- Preceded by: Somerville Hastings
- Succeeded by: Jo Richardson

Personal details
- Born: Thomas Edward Neil Driberg; 22 May 1905 Crowborough, Sussex, England
- Died: 12 August 1976 (aged 71) Paddington, London, England
- Resting place: Bradwell Cemetery, Bradwell-on-Sea
- Party: Labour
- Other political affiliations: Communist Party of Great Britain
- Spouse: Ena Mary Driberg (m. 1951)
- Education: Christ Church, Oxford
- Occupation: Journalist, politician

Thomas Edward Neil Driberg, Baron Bradwell (22 May 1905 – 12 August 1976) was a British journalist, politician, High Anglican churchman and possible Soviet spy, who served as a Member of Parliament (MP) from 1942 to 1955, and again from 1959 to 1974. A member of the Communist Party of Great Britain for more than twenty years, he was first elected to Parliament as an Independent and joined the Labour Party in 1945. He never held any ministerial office, but rose to senior positions within the Labour Party and was a popular and influential figure in left-wing politics for many years.

The son of a retired colonial officer, Driberg was educated at Lancing and Christ Church, Oxford. After leaving the university without a degree, he attempted to establish himself as a poet before joining the Daily Express as a reporter, later becoming a columnist. In 1933 he began the "William Hickey" society column, which he continued to write until 1943. He was later a regular columnist for the Co-operative Group newspaper Reynold's News and for other left-leaning journals. He wrote several books, including biographies of the press baron Lord Beaverbrook and the Soviet spy Guy Burgess. He retired from the House of Commons in 1974, and was subsequently raised to the peerage as Baron Bradwell, of Bradwell juxta Mare in the County of Essex.

Driberg made no secret of his homosexuality, which he practised throughout his life despite its being a criminal offence in Britain until 1967; his ability to avoid any consequences for his risky and often brazen behaviour baffled his friends and colleagues. Always in search of bizarre experiences, Driberg befriended at various times the occultist Aleister Crowley and the Kray twins, along with honoured and respected figures in the worlds of literature and politics. He combined this lifestyle with an unwavering devotion to Anglo-Catholicism. Following his death, allegations were published about his role over many years as an MI5 informant, a KGB agent, or both. The extent and nature of Driberg's involvement with these agencies remain uncertain.

== Early life ==
=== Family background and childhood ===
Driberg was born on 22 May 1905 in Crowborough, a small dormitory town about 40 miles (64 km) south of London. He was the youngest of three sons born to John James Street Driberg, a former officer in the Indian Civil Service, and his wife Amy Mary Irving Driberg (née Bell). The Driberg family had immigrated from Holland about 200 years previously; the Bells were lowland Scots from Dumfriesshire. John Driberg had retired in 1896 after 35 years in Assam, latterly as head of the state's police, and was 65 years old when his youngest son was born. For Tom Driberg, growing up mostly alone with his elderly parents was a stifling experience; he would later describe Crowborough as "a place which I can never revisit, or think of, without a feeling of sick horror".

At the age of eight Driberg began as a day-boy at the Grange school in Crowborough. In his autobiography he mentions in particular two aspects of his time there: learning the "facts of life" from other boys, with extensive experimentation, and his discovery of what he calls "exotic" religion—High Anglicanism. These experiences formed what he called two "conflicting compulsions", soon to be joined by a third—left-wing politics—to shape the ruling passions of his life.

=== Lancing ===
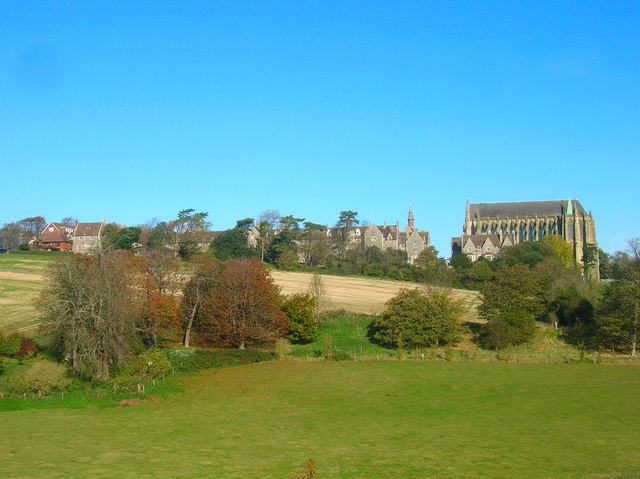
Lancing College in West Sussex; the tall building to the right is the Gothic Revival Lancing College Chapel

In 1918, when he was 13, Driberg left the Grange for Lancing College, the public school near Worthing on the south coast where, after some initial bullying and humiliation, he was befriended by fellow-pupil Evelyn Waugh. Under Waugh's sponsorship Driberg joined an intellectual society, the Dilettanti, which promoted literary and artistic activities alongside political debate. He began to write poetry; his aesthetic education was further assisted by J. F. Roxburgh, "a magnetically brilliant teacher" who later became headmaster of Stowe School.

Lancing's Gothic chapel gave Driberg the religious atmosphere he sought, though he found the services disappointingly "moderate". By 1920 he was inclining to the political left and was in rebellion against his conservative upbringing. Finding the Labour Party too dull for his tastes, he joined the Brighton branch of the newly formed Communist Party of Great Britain.

After Driberg had risen to responsible positions within the school (deputy head boy, head librarian, and chief sacristan, among others), his Lancing career ended suddenly in the autumn of 1923, when two boys complained about his sexual overtures. To avoid distressing the widowed Amy Driberg (John Driberg had died in 1919), the headmaster allowed him to remain in the school for the remainder of the term, stripped of his offices and segregated from all social contact with other boys. At the end of the term he was required to leave, on the pretext that he needed private tuition to pass his Oxford entrance examination which he had failed the previous summer. Back in Crowborough, after several months' application under the guidance of his tutor, the young lawyer Colin Pearson, Driberg won a classics scholarship to Christ Church, Oxford.

== Oxford ==
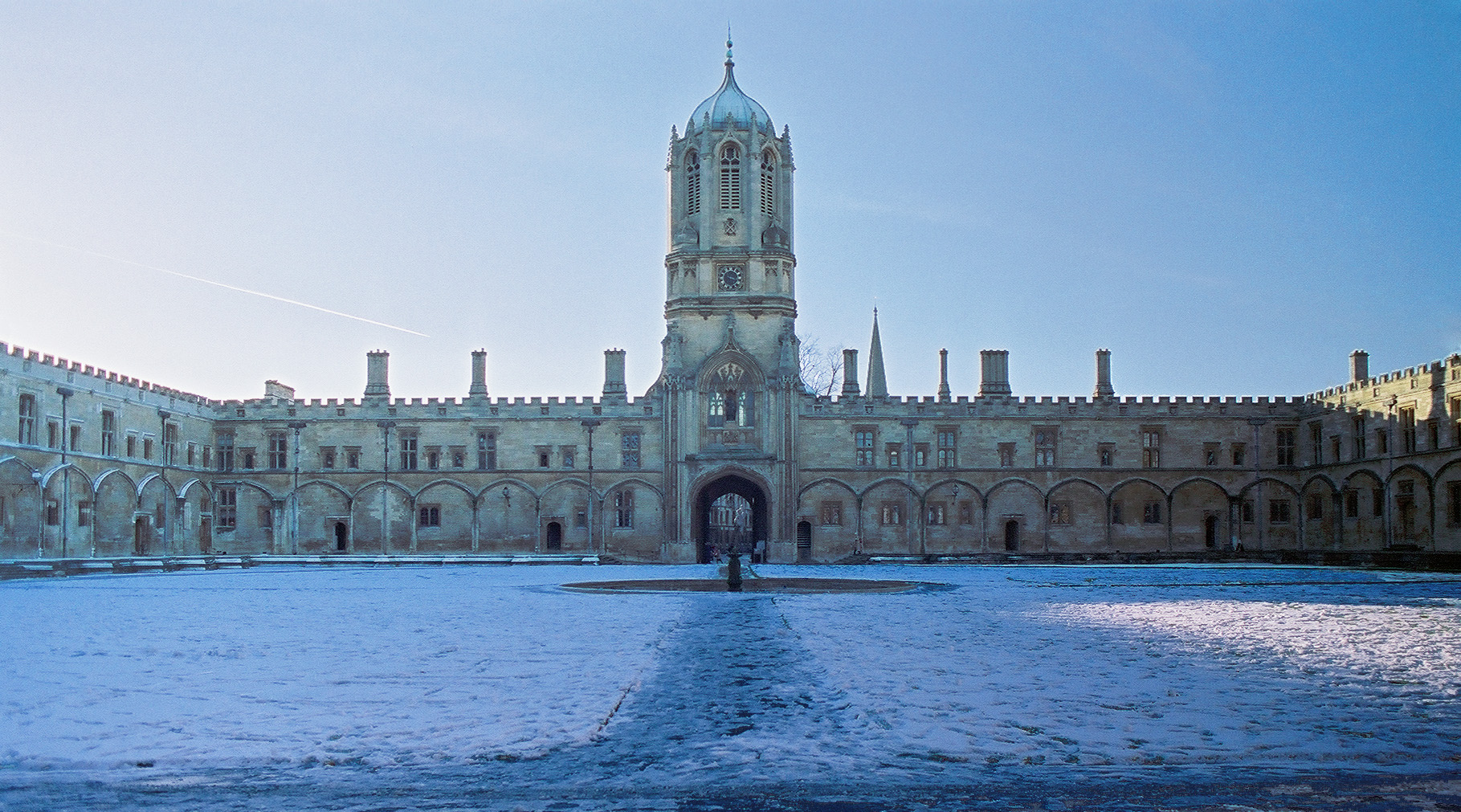
Christ Church, Oxford in the snow; photographed in 2004

Oxford in 1924 featured an avant-garde aesthetic movement in which personalities such as Harold Acton, Brian Howard, Cyril Connolly and, a little later, W. H. Auden were leading lights. Driberg was soon immersed in a world of art, politics, poetry and parties: "There was just no time for any academic work", he wrote later. With Auden, he discovered T. S. Eliot's The Waste Land, which they read again and again, "with growing awe". A poem by Driberg, in the style of Edith Sitwell, was published in Oxford Poetry 1926; when Sitwell came to Oxford to deliver a lecture, Driberg invited her to have tea with him, and she accepted. After her lecture he found an opportunity to recite one of his own poems, and was rewarded when Sitwell declared him "the hope of English poetry".

Meanwhile, together with the future historian A. J. P. Taylor, Driberg formed the membership of the Oxford University Communist Party. During the General Strike of May 1926, most Oxford students supported the government and enrolled as special constables and strike-breakers. A minority, which included the future Labour Party leader Hugh Gaitskell and the future Poet Laureate John Betjeman, sided with the strikers, while Driberg and Taylor offered their services at the British Communist Party's headquarters in London. The Party showed no urgency to employ them, and Taylor soon left. Driberg, given a job distributing strike bulletins, was arrested by the police before he could begin and was detained for several hours. This ended his active role in the strike. Notwithstanding his extreme left-wing associations, he secured 75 votes (against the winner's 152) in the 1927 elections for the presidency of the Oxford Union.

Throughout his time at Oxford, Driberg followed his passion for Anglican rituals by regularly attending Mass at Pusey House, an independent religious institution with a mission to "[restore] the Church of England's Catholic life and witness". In spite of the prevalent Oxford homoerotic ethos, his sexual energies were largely devoted to casual encounters with working-class men, rather than to relationships with his fellow undergraduates. He experienced sexual relations with only one don, whom he met outside the university, unaware of the latter's identity.

One of Driberg's elaborate hoaxes was a concert called "Homage to Beethoven", which featured megaphones, typewriters and a flushing lavatory. Newspaper accounts of this event raised the interest of the occultist Aleister Crowley. Driberg accepted an invitation to lunch with Crowley for the first of several meetings between them, at one of which Crowley nominated Driberg as his successor as World Teacher. Nothing came of the proposal, though the two continued to meet; Driberg received from Crowley manuscripts and books that he later sold for sizeable sums. These various extracurricular activities resulted in neglect of his academic work. He failed his final examinations and, in the summer of 1927, he left Oxford without a degree.

== Daily Express columnist ==
=== "The Talk of London" ===
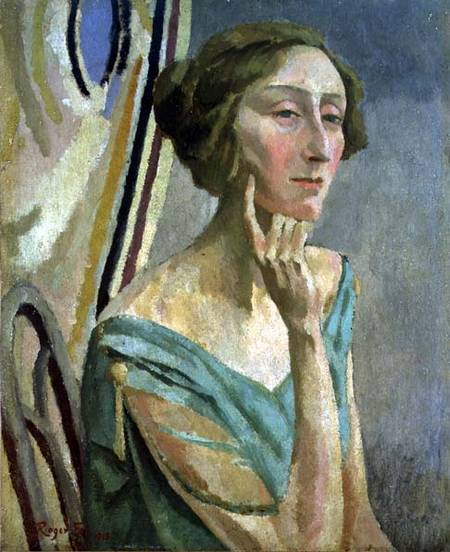
Portrait (1915) of Edith Sitwell, Driberg's early mentor (by Roger Fry)

After leaving Oxford, Driberg lived precariously in London, attempting to establish himself as a poet while doing odd jobs and pawning his few valuables. Occasionally he had chance encounters with Oxford acquaintances; Evelyn Waugh's diary entry for 30 October 1927 records: "I went to church in Margaret Street where I was discomposed to observe Tom Driberg's satanic face in the congregation". Driberg had maintained his contact with Edith Sitwell, and attended regular literary tea parties at her Bayswater flat. When Sitwell discovered her protégé's impoverished circumstances she arranged an interview for him with the Daily Express. After his submission of an article on London's nightlife, he was engaged in January 1928 for a six-week trial as a reporter; coincidentally, Waugh had undergone an unsuccessful trial with the same newspaper a few months earlier.

Within a month of beginning his duties, Driberg achieved a scoop with the first national newspaper reports of the activities in Oxford of the American evangelist Frank Buchman, whose movement would in time be known as Moral Re-Armament. Driberg's reports were generally abrasive, even mocking in tone, and drew complaints from Buchman's organisation about news bias. The trial period at the Express was extended, and in July 1928 Driberg filed an exclusive report on a society party at the swimming baths in Buckingham Palace Road, where the guests included Lytton Strachey and Tallulah Bankhead. This evidence of Driberg's social contacts led to a permanent contract with the Express, as assistant to Percy Sewell who, under the name "The Dragoman", wrote a daily feature called "The Talk of London". Driberg later defended his association with an inconsequential society column by arguing that his approach was satirical, and that he deliberately exaggerated the doings of the idle rich as a way of enraging working-class opinion and helping the Communist Party.

Driberg used the column to introduce readers to up-and-coming socialites and literary figures, Acton, Betjeman, Nancy Mitford and Peter Quennell among them. Sometimes he introduced more serious causes: capital punishment, modern architecture, the works of D. H. Lawrence and Jacob Epstein, and the lesbian novel The Well of Loneliness by Radclyffe Hall, which had been denounced in the Express editorial columns as "infamous". By prior arrangement with Waugh, the column included a discreet announcement in September 1930 of Waugh's conversion to Roman Catholicism; Driberg was his only guest at the service. He further assisted Waugh in 1932 by giving him space in the column to attack the editor of the Catholic journal The Tablet, after it had described Waugh's Black Mischief as blasphemous.

=== As William Hickey ===
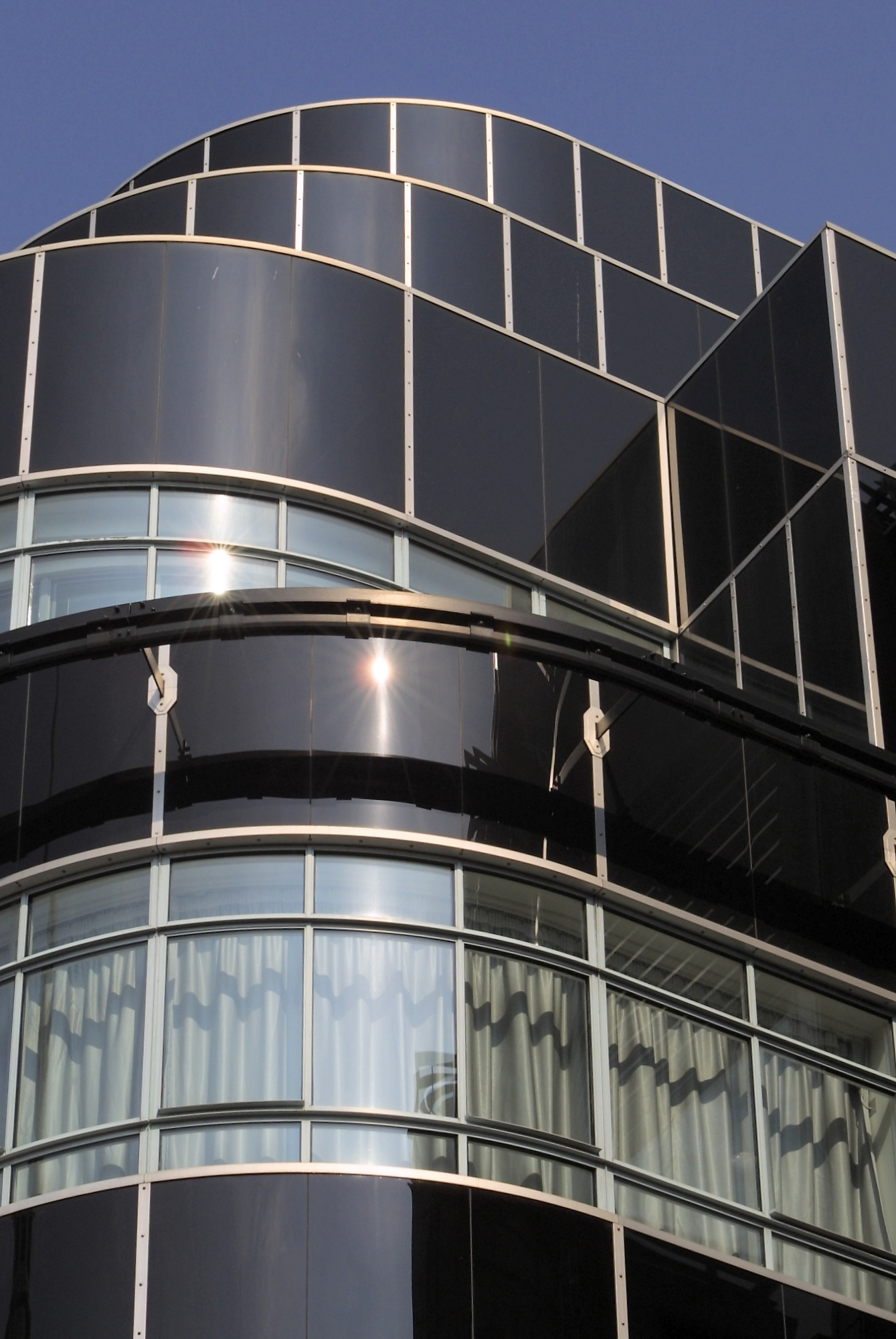
The Art Deco Daily Express building in Fleet Street, London

Sewell retired in 1932, leaving Driberg in sole charge of "The Talk of London" column. He grew increasingly frustrated with the trivial nature of his work. Following the intervention of Express proprietor Lord Beaverbrook, the column was relaunched in May 1933 as "These Names Make News", and its by-line changed to "William Hickey", after the 18th-century diarist and rake. Driberg described the new feature as "... an intimate biographical column about ... men and women who matter. Artists, statesmen, airmen, writers, financiers, explorers..." Historian David Kynaston calls Driberg the "founder of the modern gossip column", although it soon began to move decisively away from chit-chat and towards social and political issues. The tone of the column was described by Driberg's Oxford Dictionary of National Biography (ODNB) biographer Richard Davenport-Hines as "wry, compassionate, and brimm[ing] with ... open-minded intelligence".

Beaverbrook, who had developed a fondness for Driberg, was amused by the disparity between his columnist's professed left-wing sympathies and bon vivant lifestyle. The proprietor knew of Driberg's persistent mismanagement of his personal finances, and on various occasions helped out with loans and gifts. During his time in London, Driberg had continued to indulge his taste for rough, casual sex; his memoir records many such instances. In the autumn of 1935 he was charged with indecent assault, after an incident in which he had shared his bed with two Scotsmen picked up late one night, in the bohemian district of London which Driberg had christened "Fitzrovia" in the Hickey column. Beaverbrook paid for a leading counsel, J. D. Cassels, and two unimpeachable character witnesses were recruited by the defence. Driberg was acquitted, and Beaverbrook's influence ensured that the case went unreported by the press. This was the first known instance of what writer Kingsley Amis called the "baffling immunity [Driberg] enjoyed from the law and the Press to the end of his days".

In the latter part of the 1930s Driberg travelled widely: twice to Spain, to observe the Spanish Civil War, to Germany after the Munich Agreement of 1938, to Rome for the coronation of Pope Pius XII and to New York for the 1939 New York World's Fair. After the Nazi-Soviet Pact was announced in August 1939, he informed his readers that there would be "no war this crisis". Nine days later, after the German invasion of Poland precipitated the Second World War, he apologised for his mistake, and ended his first wartime column with the words "We're all in it". His opposition to the Nazi-Soviet Pact and his support for the war in September 1939 may have been the reason for his expulsion from the Communist Party in 1941. An alternative explanation, proffered later, is that he was reported by Anthony Blunt for passing information on the Party to Maxwell Knight of MI5. Driberg and Knight were long-standing acquaintances who met frequently and, among other things, shared a mutual interest in the works of Aleister Crowley.

Driberg's mother had died in July 1939. With his share of her money and the help of a substantial mortgage, he bought and renovated Bradwell Lodge, a country house in Bradwell-on-Sea on the Essex coast, where he lived and entertained until the house was requisitioned by the Royal Air Force (RAF) in 1940. He continued to write the Hickey column, not always to his editor's satisfaction; his protestations against indiscriminate bombing of German civilians were particularly frowned on. In November 1941, he went to America and was in Washington on Monday 8 December, after the attack on Pearl Harbor, to report President Roosevelt's speech to Congress announcing America's entry into the war.

== Early parliamentary career ==
=== Independent Member for Maldon, 1942–45 ===
When Driberg returned to Britain in March 1942 he found widespread public dissatisfaction with the government's conduct of the war. This mood was reflected in a series of parliamentary by-elections in which candidates supporting the wartime coalition government were defeated by independents – the major parties had agreed to a pact under which they would not contest by-elections in seats held by their respective parties. Driberg, in his column, generally welcomed this trend, while questioning "the merit of some of the candidates likely to get in if the reaction against the Party machines continues". On 12 May 1942 the death was announced of Sir Edward Ruggles-Brise, the Conservative member for Maldon—the constituency in which Bradwell Lodge was situated. Next day, Driberg requested three weeks' leave from his column to fight the by-election. Contrary to the belief of prime minister Winston Churchill and others that Driberg was being "run" by Beaverbrook, the Express proprietor was unenthusiastic; an editorial on 25 May drew attention to Driberg's individual viewpoint and stated that "The Daily Express does not support his candidature".

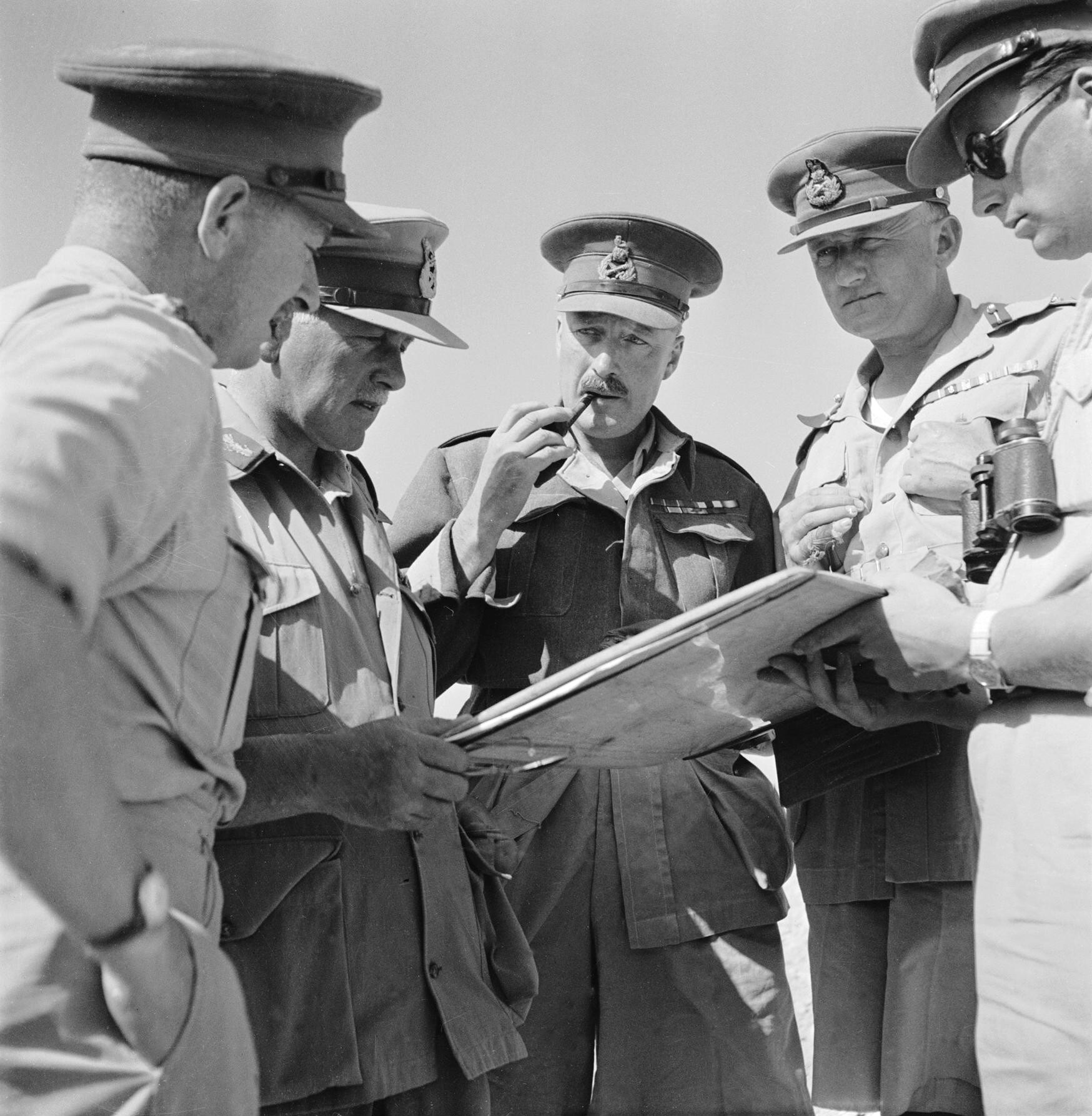
British Eighth Army Commander Gen. Neil Ritchie (centre, with pipe). The surrender of Tobruk on 21 June 1942 after Ritchie's defeat at Gazala may have contributed to Driberg's by-election victory.

Driberg's campaign slogan was "A Candid Friend For Churchill", personally supportive but critical of many of the prime minister's circle. The lacklustre campaign of his right-wing Conservative opponent helped to secure Driberg a wide range of support, from moderate Conservatives, Liberals and socialists. His fame as "William Hickey", and his stance as the only candidate with a home in the constituency, gave him a strong local profile. His previous Communist Party associations were not revealed. At the poll, on 25 June, he overturned a Conservative majority of 8,000 to finish 6,000 votes ahead of his opponent. In his war memoirs, Churchill called the result "one of the by-products of Tobruk" – which had fallen to Rommel on 21 June following the recent Battle of Gazala. Waugh, in his diary, remarked that the presentation of Driberg during the by-election merely as a journalist and churchwarden gave "a very imperfect picture of that sinister character".

On 2 July 1942 Driberg cast his first vote in the House of Commons, in support of Churchill against a rebel motion of censure on the government's conduct of the war. The rebels' case was put incompetently, which ensured that the motion gained only 25 votes, as against 477 cast for the government. Driberg delivered his maiden speech on 7 July, in a debate on the use of propaganda. He called for the lifting of the ban on the Communist Party's newspaper, the Daily Worker, which he saw as a potentially valuable weapon of home propaganda.

In the following months he tabled questions and intervened in debates on behalf of various progressive causes. On 29 September 1942 he asked the prime minister to "make friendly representations to the American military authorities asking them to instruct their men that the colour bar is not a custom in this country". He continued to write the Hickey column and used his parliamentary salary to fund a constituency office in Maldon.

In January 1943, while in Edinburgh to campaign in another by-election, Driberg was caught by a policeman while in the act of fellating a Norwegian sailor. In his account of the incident Driberg records that he escaped arrest by identifying himself as "William Hickey" and as a member of parliament. These disclosures evidently overawed the constable, who took no further action; indeed, Driberg says, the incident began a chaste friendship with the officer that endured for more than ten years. Beaverbrook had become disenchanted with him, and did not intervene when Arthur Christiansen, the Express editor, sacked the columnist in June 1943 over a story detrimental to a government minister, Andrew Rae Duncan. Driberg subsequently signed up with Reynolds News, a Sunday newspaper owned by The Co-operative Group, and undertook a regular parliamentary column for the New Statesman. He also contributed to a weekly BBC European Service broadcast until, in October 1943, he was banned after government pressure. He reported the post-D-Day allied advances in France and Belgium as a war correspondent for Reynolds News, and as a member of a parliamentary delegation witnessed the aftermath of the liberation of Buchenwald concentration camp in April 1945. Driberg was chosen to write the delegation's final report due to his experience of journalism.

=== Labour Member, 1945–55 ===
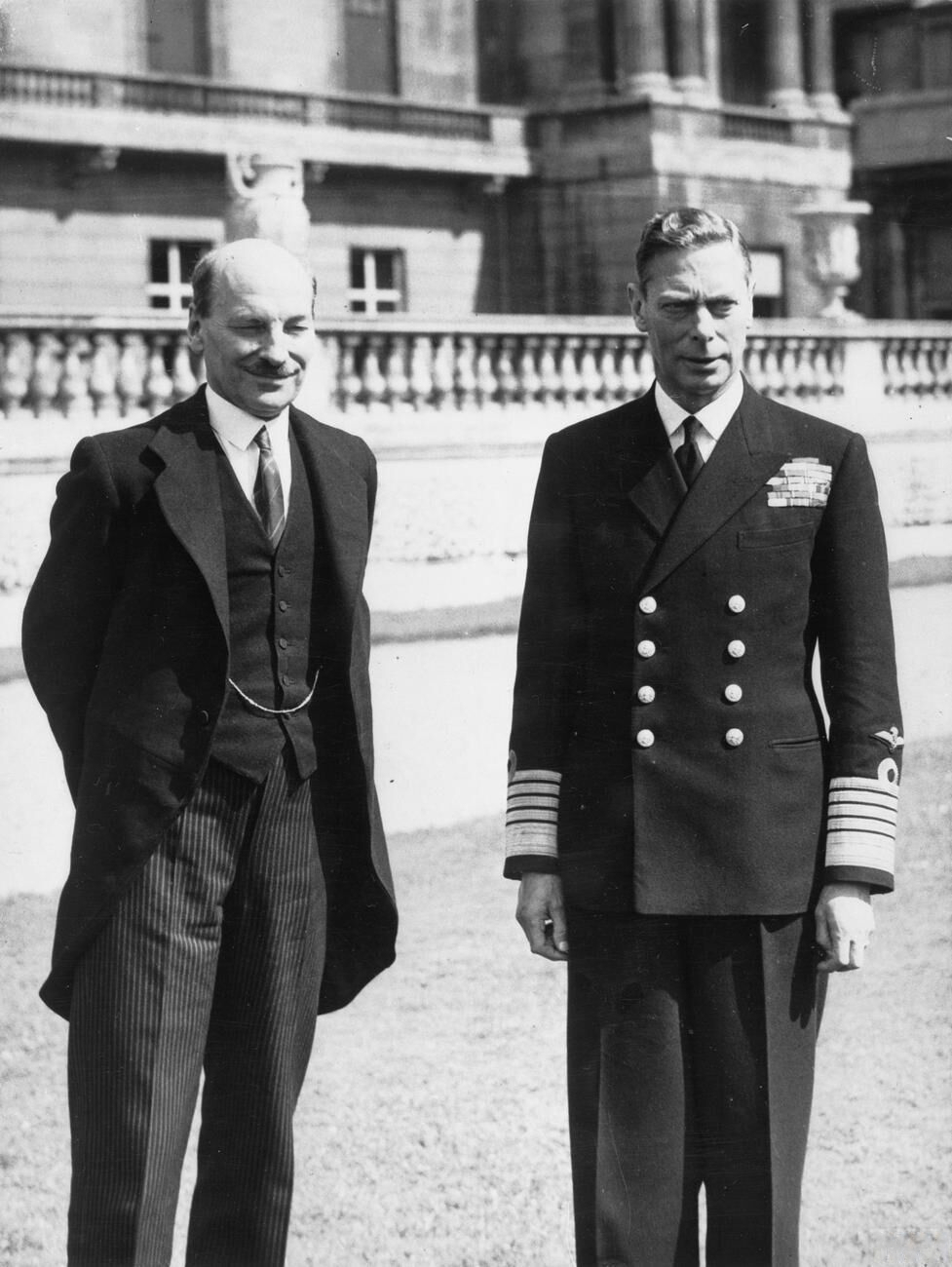
Clement Attlee with King George VI, following the Labour Party's election in 1945. Attlee served as prime minister from 1945 to 1951.

In the general election of July 1945 Driberg increased his majority at Maldon to 7,727. Before the election he had joined the Labour Party and had been welcomed by the local constituency party as their candidate. He was thus one of the 393 Labour MPs in the landslide election victory that replaced Churchill as prime minister with Clement Attlee.

Within a few days of his victory, Driberg left for the Far East, to report on the conditions of the allied troops in Burma. The Supreme Allied Commander, Lord Mountbatten, knew him slightly and made him an unofficial temporary special adviser. In this role he met the Patriotic Burmese Forces leader, Aung San, who impressed him as honest and incorruptible, "unlike some of the older Burmese politicians". Later, he visited Saigon and offered to mediate with Ho Chi Minh, who had recently declared an independent Vietnam state. Driberg later maintained that, had his offer been taken up, he might have prevented the Vietnam War.

Because of his journalism, Driberg was a well-known figure within the Labour Party generally, and in 1949 was elected to the party's National Executive Committee (NEC). In the February 1950 general election he was again elected at Maldon, while nationally Labour lost 68 seats, reducing its parliamentary majority to six. With so small a majority, members' regular attendance in the Commons chamber became important; however, in August 1950 Driberg left the country for Korea, where Britain had joined the United States in a United Nations military expedition to repel the North Korean invasion of the South. Driberg and a few other left-wing MPs had objected to British involvement; In his Reynolds News column, Driberg had written of "Tories (Conservatives) who ... cannot help baying their delight at the smell of blood in the air", a comment that caused outrage in parliament among the Conservative members. Whatever his reservations, Driberg's war dispatches to Reynolds News were strongly supportive of the British troops. He participated in several night operations, and won respect from many of the soldiers for his courage despite, as one Marine put it "being a bit bent". He was away from parliament for three months, missing many critical House of Commons divisions, and on his return was severely censured by his fellow Labour MPs for neglecting his duties. His general standing in the party was unaffected; he had been re-elected in absentia to the NEC in September 1950.

In April 1951 the Labour government was hit by the resignations of three ministers—Aneurin Bevan, the future prime minister Harold Wilson, and John Freeman—over the imposition of prescription charges to pay for an increased armaments programme. Driberg was sympathetic to the rebels, though he tried to find a basis for compromise that would avoid resignations. The former ministers strengthened the small Labour group known as "Keep Left", in which Driberg was prominent; the group would henceforth be known as "Bevanites". In the October 1951 general election the Labour Party was defeated, and Churchill resumed office; Driberg held on to his Maldon seat by 704 votes. Through the years of Labour government he had neither received nor sought office, having what historian Kenneth O. Morgan called a "backbench mindset". He still enjoyed aspects of his parliamentary life, such as in 1953 when he showed the American singing sensation Johnnie Ray round the House of Commons; his attempts to seduce the singer were politely resisted. However, he needed to earn more money, and in the spring of 1952 responded to a suggestion that he should write a biography of Beaverbrook. The press lord was amenable, and work began in the summer of 1953. The project extended over several years, by which time Driberg was no longer in parliament; he had announced in March 1954 that he was standing down from Maldon, which at the general election of May 1955 fell, as he had expected, to the Conservatives.

== Marriage ==
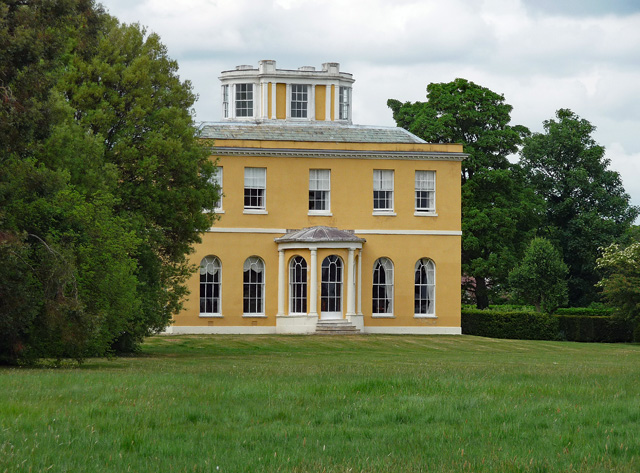
Bradwell Lodge in Essex in 2011

On 16 February 1951 Driberg surprised his friends by announcing his engagement to Ena Mary Binfield (née Lyttelton). A former Suffolk county councillor, she worked as an administrator at the Marie Curie Hospital in London and was well known in senior Labour circles; she had met Driberg in 1949, at a weekend party given by the government minister George Strauss. According to her son, she was fully aware of Driberg's sexual preferences, but looked forward to some political excitement, and "thought they could do a useful job as Mr. and Mrs." Driberg's motives are less clear, but he told his friend John Freeman that he needed someone to run Bradwell Lodge, to which he had returned in 1946 after its release by the RAF.

At Driberg's insistence, Ena, a non-practising Jew, was baptised into the Church of England before the wedding at St Mary's, Bourne Street on 30 June 1951. The bride entered the church to a chorale arranged from the Labour Party anthem "The Red Flag"; this was followed by a nuptial mass described by Driberg's biographer Francis Wheen as "outrageously ornate". Four hundred guests then attended an elaborate reception at the House of Commons.

In the ensuing years Ena tried hard to adapt to Driberg's way of life and to control his wayward finances, but with little success. He continued his frequent travels and casual homosexual liaisons, and was hostile to her efforts to control or change any aspect of his life. In 1961 she wrote to him: "I have tried for ten years to make a compromise with you in your extraordinary mode of life and have now given up." Thereafter they often lived apart, though they never formally separated. Even after a final breach in 1971, they remained legally married.

== Later career ==
=== Out of parliament ===
On leaving parliament in 1955, Driberg's main task was to complete the Beaverbrook biography. Although Beaverbrook had initially promised no interference with the text, he changed his mind when he began to read Driberg's drafts. In the course of a prolonged disagreement, Beaverbrook accused his biographer of being driven by "malice and hatred". When the manuscript was finally cleared for publication, much of the objectionable material had been removed; nevertheless, Beaverbrook used the Daily Express to campaign against the book and denounce its hostile tone. Evelyn Waugh, to whom Driberg sent a copy, expressed disappointment that the work was in fact "a honeyed eulogy".

In an effort to build his post-parliamentary career, Driberg turned briefly to creative writing, but without success. In his more familiar field of journalism he caused a sensation by flying to Moscow in August 1956 to interview Guy Burgess, the former British diplomat who in 1951 had defected to Russia with his colleague Donald Maclean. The pair had emerged in Moscow in February 1956, to give a brief press conference. Driberg had known Burgess in the 1940s, and the two shared similar homosexual inclinations; this acquaintance was sufficient to secure the Moscow interview. On his return home Driberg rapidly wrote a book from the interview material, the serial rights of which were sold to the Daily Mail. Critics drew attention to the book's relatively sympathetic portrayal of Burgess; some believed the book had been vetted by the KGB, while others saw it as part of an MI5 plot to trap Burgess into revealing secret information for which he could be prosecuted should he ever return to Britain.

In 1956, Driberg convened a group of Christian socialists that met regularly at the Lamb public house in Bloomsbury to discuss issues such as imperialism, colonialism, immigration and nuclear disarmament. The group's dispatches, Papers from the Lamb, led to the foundation in 1960 of the Christian Socialist Movement. Although no longer an MP, Driberg remained a member of the Labour Party's NEC and was active in party affairs. In 1957, in the face of antagonism from trade union leaders repelled by his lifestyle, he became Labour Party chairman, a largely ceremonial role. He travelled widely during his year in office, generally as a Reynolds News correspondent but using the party title to advantage whenever he could. Thus, in a 1958 visit to Moscow to interview space scientists, he obtained two meetings with Nikita Khrushchev.

In his final speech as chairman, to the party conference in 1958, Driberg angered the Conservatives and their press supporters by referring to the Tory ideology as not essentially different from the German Herrenvolk philosophy. He had been contemplating for some time a return to the House of Commons, and in February 1959 was adopted as a candidate by the Barking constituency, a safe seat for the Labour Party. In the general election of October 1959, which delivered a 100-seat majority to Harold Macmillan's Conservative government, he won at Barking with a majority of exactly 12,000.

=== Member for Barking, 1959–74 ===
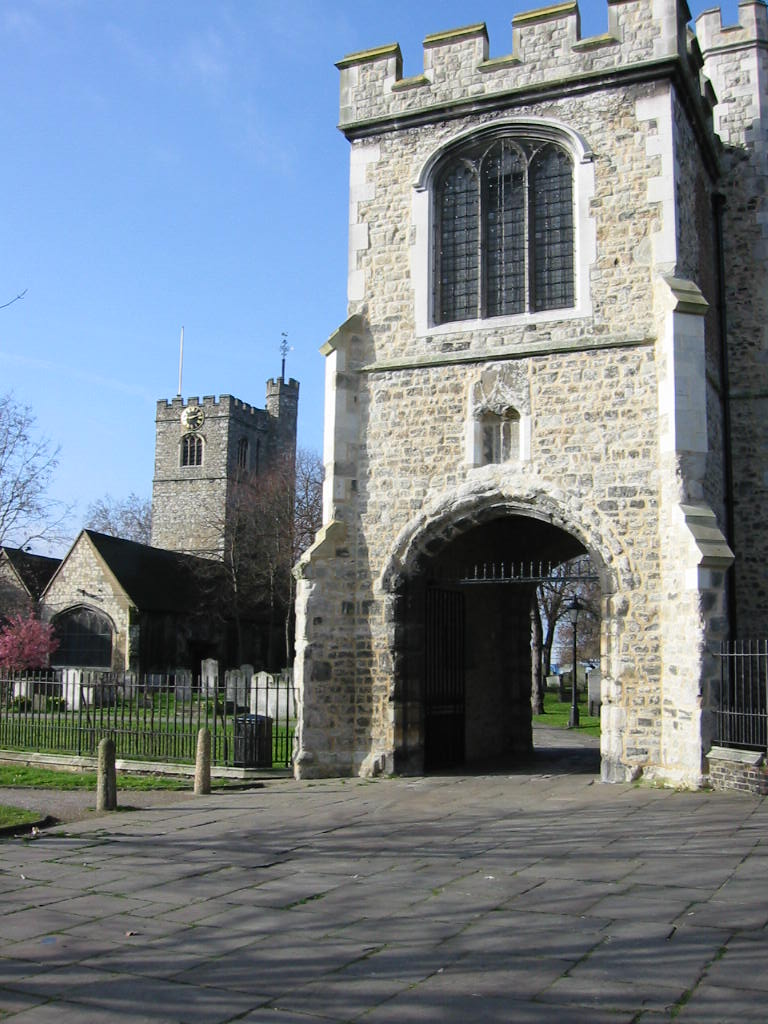
Barking Abbey in Barking, Essex, Driberg's parliamentary constituency 1959–74

A dominant issue when Driberg returned to Westminster was that of the use or outlawing of nuclear weapons. The Campaign for Nuclear Disarmament (CND) had been launched on 17 February 1958, though Driberg's involvement with the issue predated CND by three years. On 2 March 1955, in an amendment to a House of Commons motion, he had called for Great Britain to "regain the moral leadership of the world by taking an initiative ... that may lead to the outlawing of ... thermo-nuclear weapons".

In October 1960 he supported the unilateralist motions passed at the Labour Party conference, and fought unsuccessfully in the NEC for them to be adopted as party policy. The conference motion was reversed the following year, but he continued to pursue the matter in parliament. On 29 May 1962, he urged that Britain not be a party to the renewal of nuclear tests, and in a speech on 23 July he said: "The unilateral abandonment of testing—or, better still, a test ban agreement—would be the most valuable first step towards general and complete disarmament."

According to his colleague Ian Mikardo, Driberg was less than enthusiastic about his duties in Barking—"a very, very bad constituency MP". Even his strongest supporters acknowledged that he attended as few local events as possible. In the Commons chamber he was a regular speaker on issues that concerned him, in particular disarmament, church affairs and racial discrimination. He supported the lowering of the voting age to 18, and the broadcasting of parliamentary debates; he opposed increases to judges' salaries and the extension of Stansted Airport. After the general election of 1964, which narrowly returned Labour to power under Harold Wilson, he was not offered a place in the new government, and soon found himself in opposition to Wilson's policies on Vietnam, the Common Market, immigration and other major issues. He joined with Mikardo and other dissidents to form the "Tribune Group", with the aim of promoting more left-wing policies. The group's influence lessened after March 1966, when in another general election Wilson increased his majority to 98.

Driberg embraced enthusiastically the climate of the 1960s and the social and cultural freedoms that the decade introduced. In 1963, he met the Kray twins, prominent London gangland figures, and began a lengthy friendship with them and their associates. In July 1964, two backbench Conservative MPs reported to their Chief Whip that Driberg and Lord Boothby (a well-known Conservative peer) had been importuning males at a dog track, and were involved with gangs of thugs.

At parties which Driberg and Boothby attended at the Krays' flat, "rough but compliant East End lads were served like so many canapés", according to Wheen. While Driberg avoided publicity, Boothby was hounded by the press and forced to issue a series of denials. After the twins had been convicted of murder in 1969, Driberg frequently lobbied the Home Office about their prison conditions, requesting that they be given more visits and allowed regular reunions. Driberg was impressed with Mick Jagger, to whom he was introduced in 1965, and tried hard over a number of years to persuade the singer to take up active Labour politics. He also began a long association with the satirical magazine Private Eye, supplying it with political gossip and, under the pseudonym "Tiresias", compiling a regular, highly risqué prize cryptic crossword puzzle which on one occasion was won by the wife of the future Archbishop of Canterbury.

In 1964, Driberg published a critical study of Moral Re-armament, which brought him attacks from the movement on the basis of his homosexuality and communist past. Although he made money from this book, throughout the 1960s he was beset by financial problems. When Reynolds News, which had evolved into the Sunday Citizen, finally folded in 1967, he became fully dependent on his parliamentary salary and casual journalism. He had long considered selling Bradwell Lodge, preferably to the National Trust on a basis that would allow him to continue living there. However, the Trust required the property to be mortgage-free and endowed with a substantial fund to cover future repairs, neither of which terms could be arranged. In the event, the house remained unsold until 1971. As the 1970 election approached, Driberg wished to retire from parliament, and asked Wilson to appoint him as ambassador to the Vatican. Wilson refused, citing Driberg's age — at 65 he was beyond the retirement age for senior diplomats.

Against his will, but with few other sources of income available to him, Driberg fought the June 1970 general election. He was returned for Barking with a comfortable though reduced majority; nationally, Wilson's government was defeated by Edward Heath's Conservatives.

== Retirement, ennoblement and death ==
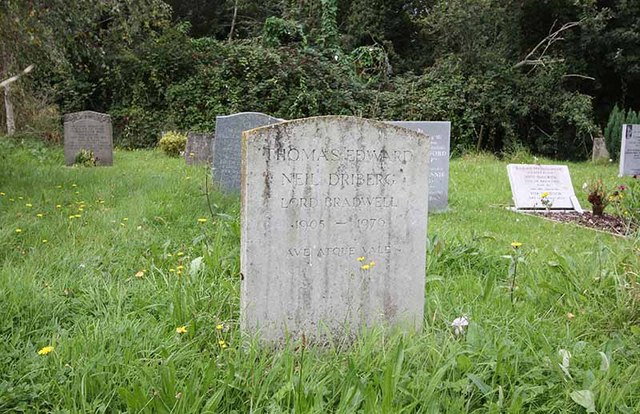
Driberg's grave in Bradwell-on-Sea cemetery in Essex

Hampered by age and declining health, Driberg became less active politically, and in 1972 was voted off Labour's NEC. The sale of Bradwell Lodge to a private buyer removed his main burden of debt, and he rented a small flat in the Barbican development in the City of London. In February 1974, at the age of 68, he retired from the House of Commons with the intention of writing his memoirs. Still short of income, he first completed a biography of his fellow-journalist Hannen Swaffer, which was indifferently received—"a feeble potboiler", according to Davenport-Hines. Friends organised an elaborate 70th birthday party for him on 21 May 1975; "one duke, two dukes' daughters, sundry lords, a bishop, a poet laureate—not bad for an old left-wing MP", Driberg observed to a guest.

In November 1975 he was granted a life peerage, and on 21 January 1976 was introduced to the House of Lords as Baron Bradwell, of Bradwell juxta Mare in the County of Essex. On 14 April he tabled a motion in the Lords calling on the government to consider the withdrawal of troops from Northern Ireland, but won little support. His health was failing, though he continued to work on his memoirs. His final contribution to the House of Lords was on 22 July, in a debate on entry vouchers for the dependents of immigrants.

Three weeks later, on 12 August 1976, while travelling by taxi from Paddington to his Barbican flat, he suffered a fatal heart attack. The funeral was held on 19 August at St Matthew's, Westminster; he was buried in the cemetery attached to St Thomas's Church, Bradwell-on-Sea.

== Allegations of treachery ==
After the publication of his relatively sympathetic portrait of Burgess in 1956, Driberg had been denounced as a "dupe of Moscow" by some elements of the press. Two years after Driberg's death, the investigative reporter Chapman Pincher alleged that he had been "a Kremlin agent of sympathy" and a supporter of Communist front organisations. In 1979 Andrew Boyle published The Climate of Treason, which exposed Anthony Blunt and led to a period of "spy mania" in Britain. Boyle's exhaustive account of the Burgess–Maclean–Philby–Blunt circle mentioned Driberg as a friend of Burgess, "of much the same background, tastes and views", but made no allegations that he was part of an espionage ring.

In this atmosphere, Pincher published Their Trade is Treachery (1981), in which he maintained that Driberg had been recruited by MI5 to spy on the Communist Party while still a schoolboy at Lancing, and that he was later "in the KGB's pay as a double agent". Other writers added further details; the former British Intelligence officer Peter Wright, in Spycatcher (1987), alleged that Driberg had been "providing material to a Czech controller for money". The former Kremlin archivist Vasili Mitrokhin asserted that the Soviets had blackmailed Driberg into working for the KGB by threatening to expose his homosexuality. In a 2016 biography of Burgess, Andrew Lownie reports that Driberg was "caught in a KGB sting operation" at a Moscow urinal, and as a result agreed to work as a Soviet agent.

The weight of information, and its constant repetition, made an apparently strong case against Driberg, and former friends such as Mervyn Stockwood, the Bishop of Southwark, became convinced that he had indeed betrayed his country. Other friends and colleagues were more sceptical. According to ex-Labour MP Reginald Paget, not even the security services were "lunatic enough to recruit a man like Driberg", who was famously indiscreet and could never keep a secret. Mitrokhin's "blackmail" story is questioned by historian Jeff Sharlet, on the grounds that by the 1950s and 1960s Driberg's homosexuality had been an open secret in British political circles for many years; he frequently boasted of his "rough trade" conquests to his colleagues. The journalist A. N. Wilson quotes Churchill commenting years before that "Tom Driberg is the sort of person who gives sodomy a bad name".

Pincher, however, argued that as homosexual acts were criminal offences in Britain until 1967, Driberg was still vulnerable to blackmail, although he also claimed that the MI5 connection secured Driberg a lifelong immunity from prosecution. Driberg's colleague Michael Foot denied Pincher's claim that Margaret Thatcher, when prime minister, had made a secret agreement with Foot to protect Driberg if Foot, in turn, would remain silent about the supposed treachery of Roger Hollis, another of Pincher's recently dead targets.

Wheen asserts that Pincher was not an objective commentator; the Labour Party, and its supposed infiltration by Communist agents, had been his target over many years. Pincher's verdict on Driberg is that "in journalism, in politics and intelligence ... eventually, he betrayed everybody". Wheen argues that Driberg's greatest vice was indiscretion; he gossiped about everyone, but "indiscretion is not synonymous with betrayal". Driberg's Labour Party colleague, Leo Abse, offers a more complex explanation: Driberg was an adventurer who loved taking risks and played many parts. "Driberg could have played the part of the spy with superb skill, and if the officers of MI5 were indeed inept enough to have attempted to recruit him, then, in turn, Tom Driberg would have gained special pleasure in fooling and betraying them".

== Appraisal ==
In his will Driberg had stipulated that at his funeral his friend Gerard Irvine, an Anglo-Catholic priest, should deliver an "anti-panegyric" in place of the normal eulogy. Irvine obliged, with a detailed assessment of Driberg against the Seven Deadly Sins, finding him guilty of Gluttony, Lust and Wrath, but relatively free from Avarice and Envy and entirely untouched by Sloth. Pride, Irvine maintained, was in Driberg's case mitigated by "the contrary virtue of humility". Ena did not attend the funeral; she gave a single press interview in which she expressed "huge respect for Tom's journalistic skills, political power and championship of the underdog". She added that if her admiration for him did not extend to their personal life together, that was a private matter.

Driberg prided himself on being an exception to a rule propounded by Cyril Connolly, that the war between the generations is the one war in which everyone changes sides eventually. Mervyn Stockwood, in his address at the funeral service, praised Driberg as "a searcher for truth", whose loyalty to the socialist cause was beyond question. This verdict was echoed by Michael Foot, who in a postscript to Driberg's memoir wrote of Driberg's "great services" to the Labour Party in the various offices that he occupied. Foot believed that Driberg's homosexual passion, rather than bringing him fulfilment, had "condemned him to a lifetime of deep loneliness". The Times obituarist described Driberg as "A journalist, an intellectual, a drinking man, a gossip, a high churchman, a liturgist, a homosexual", the first time, according to journalist Christopher Hitchens, that the newspaper had ever defined a public figure specifically as homosexual.

Nevertheless, Driberg's incomplete memoir Ruling Passions, when published in June 1977, was a shock to the public and to some of his erstwhile associates, despite advance hints of the book's scandalous content. Driberg's candid revelations of his "cottaging" and his descriptions of casual oral sex were called by one commentator "the biggest outpouring of literary dung a public figure has ever flung into print." The comedians Peter Cook and Dudley Moore depicted Driberg as a sexual predator, wearing "fine fishnet stockings" and cavorting with a rent boy, in a sketch, "Back of the Cab", which they recorded in 1977.

More vituperation followed when Pincher's allegations of Driberg's links with the Russian secret service were published in 1981; Pincher christened him "Lord of the Spies". However, Foot dismissed these accusations as typical of the "fantasies of the secret service world that seem to have taken possession of Pincher's mind". Foot added that Driberg "had always been much too ready to look forgivingly on Communist misdeeds, but this attitude was combined with an absolutely genuine devotion to the cause of peace".

In his 2004 biographical sketch, Davenport-Hines describes Driberg as "a sincere if eccentric Christian socialist who detested racism and colonialism", who at the same time "could be pompous, mannered, wayward, self-indulgent, ungrateful, bullying and indiscreet". As to the apparent contradiction between sincere Christianity and promiscuous homosexuality, Wheen argues that "there had been a recognisable male homosexual subculture in the Anglo-Catholic movement since the late nineteenth century". This theme is explored in a paper by David Hilliard of Flinders University, who maintains that "the [19th century] conflict between Protestantism and Anglo-Catholicism within the Church of England was ... regularly depicted by Protestant propagandists as a struggle between masculine and feminine styles of religion".

In 2015 Simon Danczuk MP claimed that a retired Metropolitan Police detective sergeant had told him that Tom Driberg had been identified as a child abuser by police in 1968, but that no charges were pressed after the Director of Public Prosecutions Norman Skelhorn had been advised that proceeding with the case would not have been in the public interest. Since the detective sergeant who allegedly made these statements was deceased at the time Danczuk made this claim, it cannot be verified.

Driberg throughout his life was a devout Anglo-Catholic; Wheen suggests that Evelyn Waugh, in Brideshead Revisited, may have had Driberg in mind when the novel's protagonist Charles Ryder is warned on arrival at Oxford to "beware of Anglo-Catholics—they're all sodomites with unpleasant accents."

Driberg was the subject of a play, Tom and Clem, by Stephen Churchett, which was staged at London's Aldwych Theatre in April 1997. The action takes place during Driberg's brief visit to the Potsdam Conference in July 1945 and deals with the contrast of compromise, represented by the pragmatic Clement Attlee, and post-war idealism, personified by Driberg. Michael Gambon's portrayal of Driberg, as "a slovenly, paunchy Bacchus with a mouth that can suddenly gape like a painfully-hooked fish", won special praise from The Times critic Benedict Nightingale.

== Bibliography ==
Driberg wrote or compiled the following books:

- Mosley? No!. London: W. H. Allen. 1948. OCLC 559815889. (A pamphlet attacking Sir Oswald Mosley)
- Colonnade 1937-1947. London: The Pilot Press. 1949. OCLC 2846959. (A collection of Driberg's journalism)
- The Best of Both Worlds. A Personal Diary. London: Phoenix House. 1953. OCLC 3434288. (Driberg's journalism and diary jottings from the early 1950s)
- Beaverbrook: A Study in Power and Frustration. London: Weidenfeld and Nicolson. 1956. OCLC 559815813.
- Guy Burgess: A Portrait with Background. London: Weidenfeld and Nicolson. 1956. OCLC 559815854.
- M R A: A Critical Examination. Harlow: The Shenval Press. 1962. OCLC 559815879. (Lectures on Moral Rearmament)
- The Mystery of Moral Re-Armament a Study of Frank Buchman and His Movement. London: Secker and Warburg. 1964. OCLC 460115621.
- Swaff: The Life and Times of Hannen Swaffer. London: Macdonald and Jane's. 1974. ISBN 0-356-04369-X.
- Ruling Passions. London: Jonathan Cape. 1977. ISBN 0-224-01402-1. (Incomplete autobiography, published posthumously)
- Private Eye Crosswords. London: Hutchinson. 1983. ISBN 0-09-154431-9. (Driberg's crossword puzzles set for Private Eye magazine, collected and published posthumously)

== Sources ==
- Amis, Kingsley (1991). Memoirs. London: Hutchinson. ISBN 0-09-174533-0.
- Amory, Mark, ed. (1995) [Originally published by Weidenfeld and Nicolson, London 1980]. The Letters of Evelyn Waugh. London: Phoenix. ISBN 1-85799-245-8.
- Boyle, Andrew (1980) [Originally published by Hutchinson, London 1979]. The Climate of Treason. London: Coronet Books. ISBN 0-340-25572-2.
- Carpenter, Humphrey (1989). The Brideshead Generation: Evelyn Waugh and his Friends. London: Weidenfeld and Nicolson. ISBN 0-297-79320-9.
- Christiansen, Arthur (1961). Headlines All My Life. London: William Heinemann.
- Churchill, Winston S. (1951). The Second World War. Volume IV: The Hinge of Fate. London: Cassell & Co.
- Clark, Alan (1998). The Tories:Conservatives and the Nation State 1922–1997. London: Weidenfeld & Nicolson. ISBN 978-0-297-81849-6.
- Davie, Michael, ed. (1976). The Diaries of Evelyn Waugh. London: Weidenfeld and Nicolson. ISBN 0-297-77126-4.
- Driberg, Tom (1977). Ruling Passions. London: Jonathan Cape. ISBN 0-224-01402-1.
- Gardiner, Juliet (2011). The Thirties. London: HarperCollins. ISBN 978-0-00-731453-9.
- Green, Martin (1976). Children of the Sun: A Narrative of Decadence in England After 1918. London: Constable. ISBN 0-09-461430-X.
- Hastings, Max (1988) [Originally published by Michael Joseph, London 1987]. The Korean War. London: Pan Books. ISBN 0-330-30265-5.
- Hastings, Selina (1994). Evelyn Waugh: A biography. London: Sinclair-Stevenson. ISBN 1-85619-223-7.
- Jenkins, Roy (1992) [Originally published by Macmillan, London 1991]. A Life at the Centre. London: Pan Books. ISBN 0-333-55164-8.
- Jenkins, Roy (2002). Churchill. London: Pan Books. ISBN 0-330-48805-8. (Originally published by Macmillan, London 2001)
- Kynaston, David (2007). Austerity Britain 1945–51. London: Bloomsbury Publishing. ISBN 978-0-7475-7985-4.
- Kynaston, David (2009). Family Britain 1951–57. London: Bloomsbury Publishing. ISBN 978-0-7475-8385-1.
- Lent, Adam (2002). Social Movements Since 1945: Sec, Colour, Peace, Power. Basingstoke: Palgrave. ISBN 0-333-72009-1.
- Levin, Bernard (1970). The Pendulum Years. London: Jonathan Cape. ISBN 0-224-61963-2.
- Lownie, Andrew (2016). Stalin's Englishman: The Lives of Guy Burgess. London: Hodder & Stoughton. ISBN 978-1-473-62738-3.
- Morgan, Kenneth (2008) [Originally published by Harper Perennial, London 2007]. Michael Foot: A Life. London: Harper Perennial. ISBN 978-0-00-717827-8.
- Pincher, Chapman (1979) [Originally published by Sidgwick & Jackson, London 1978]. Inside Story. London: Sidgwick & Jackson. ISBN 0-283-98576-3.
- Pincher, Chapman (1982) [Originally published by Sidgwick & Jackson, London 1981]. Their Trade is Treachery. London: Sidgwick & Jackson. ISBN 978-0-283-98847-9.
- Sharlet, Jeff (2008). The Family: Power, Politics and Fundamentalism's Shadow Elite. St Lucia, Queensland: University of Queensland Press. ISBN 978-0-7022-3694-5.
- Thompson, Harry (1994). Richard Ingrams, Lord of the Gnomes. London: Heinemann. ISBN 978-0-434-77828-7.
- Waugh, Evelyn (1981) [Originally published by Chapman & Hall, London 1945]. Brideshead Revisited. Harmondsworth: Penguin Books. ISBN 0-14-005915-6.
- Wheen, Francis (2001). The Soul of Indiscretion: Tom Driberg, Poet, Philanderer, Legislator and Outlaw. London: Fourth Estate. ISBN 1-84115-575-6. (Originally published as Tom Driberg: His Life and Indiscretions by Chatto & Windus, London 1990)
- Wheen, Francis (2010). Strange Days Indeed: The Golden Age of Paranoia. London: Fourth Estate. ISBN 978-0-00-724428-7.
- Williams, Philip M. (1979). Hugh Gaitskell: A Political Biography. London: Jonathan Cape. ISBN 0-224-01451-X.
- Wright, Peter (1987). Spycatcher. Richmond, Victoria: William Heinemann Australia. ISBN 0-85561-098-0.
