= William Hickey (columnist) =

By-line of a Daily Express gossip column

"William Hickey" is the pseudonymous byline of a gossip column published in the Daily Express, a British newspaper. It was named after the 18th-century diarist William Hickey.

== Column ==
The column was first established by Tom Driberg in May 1933. An existing gossip column was relaunched following the intervention of the Express's proprietor Lord Beaverbrook. It was titled "These Names Make News". Driberg described the new feature as "...an intimate biographical column about...men and women who matter. Artists, statesmen, airmen, writers, financiers, explorers..."

Historian David Kynaston calls Driberg the "founder of the modern gossip column", which moved away from genteel chit-chat towards commentary on social and political issues. The tone of the column was described by biographer Richard Davenport-Hines as "wry, compassionate, and brimm[ing] with...open-minded intelligence". Driberg continued to write the column until 1943.

The column has been written by numerous anonymous journalists over the decades. In the 1960s, it was written by columnist Nigel Dempster.

In the 1970s, the column was referenced in John Cooper Clarke's poem 'You'll Never See A Nipple In The Daily Express', where "William Hickey meets Michael Caine – again and again and again and again".
