= Stone Bridge, Chelmsford =

Bridge in Chelmsford, Essex, England, UK

Coordinates: 51°43′54″N 0°28′29″E

The current Stone Bridge in Chelmsford, Essex, England, was commissioned in 1784 by the Essex Court of Quarter Sessions, who had responsibility for the crossing. The work was entrusted to John Johnson, the county surveyor for Essex from 1782 to 1812. The first stone was laid on 5 October 1785, with a temporary bridge slightly down river allowing a crossing while the work was undertaken. Stone was brought by sea from Dorset to Maldon and then transferred to carts to be taken through Danbury before reaching Chelmsford.

It became a Grade II listed structure in 1949.
