= Engines of Privilege =

Book by Francis Green and David Kynaston

Engines of Privilege: Britain's Private School Problem
- First edition
- Author: Francis Green; David Kynaston
- Publisher: Bloomsbury Publishing
- ISBN: 9781526601278
- OCLC: 1101130802

Engines of Privilege: Britain's Private School Problem is a book by Francis Green and David Kynaston about private schools in the United Kingdom. The authors argue that the "educational apartheid" of independent (private) schools and state schools in the United Kingdom:

1. prevents social mobility and meritocracy
2. underpins damaging democratic deficit
3. perpetuates privilege (and social inequality) through generations
4. deploys national resources unfairly and suboptimally

== Reviews ==
Published in 2019, the book received a range of reviews from commentators inside and outside private schools. Writing in the Financial Times, Miranda Green wrote, "we can expect the manifesto-writers at the next general election to pass magpie-like over these chapters ... The appeal to act is heartfelt." Privately educated journalist Hugo Rifkind in The Times described the book as doing "a fine job of explaining and damning Britain's private school problem", but also commented that "this powerful attack on public schools ends up an unintended advert for them".

Much of criticism of the book came from commentators who were privately educated, rather than in state schools, what the book calls independent school lobbyists on behalf of the Independent Schools Council (ISC):

- The privately educated poet Kate Clanchy writing in The Guardian, described the book as "aloof considerations of educational issues"
- Private school head Patrick Derham at Westminster School in London, saw the book as a "missed opportunity" that "falls short of a full account of the story of social mobility".

Anne McElvoy (state educated) wrote that the book "reminds us that many arguments recur down the decades".
