= The Flitch of Bacon (opera) =

1778 comic opera

- Original language: English
- Written by: Henry Bate Dudley
- Genre: Comic opera
- Setting: Essex,

Premiere
- Date: 17 August 1778
- Place: Theatre Royal, Haymarket, London

The Flitch of Bacon is a 1778 comic opera composed by William Shield with a libretto by Henry Bate Dudley. It is inspired by the Flitch of Bacon tradition and takes place at Little Dunmow Priory in Essex. It premiered at the Theatre Royal, Haymarket in London on 17 August 1778. The original cast included William Parsons as Major Benbow, Charles Bannister as Captain Wilson, John Edwin as Tipple and Elizabeth Harpur as Eliza. The Irish premiere took place at the Crow Street Theatre in Dublin on 2 December 1779. The tradition later inspired the 1854 novel The Flitch of Bacon by William Harrison Ainsworth.

== Bibliography ==
- Greene, John C. Theatre in Dublin, 1745-1820: A Calendar of Performances, Volume 6. Lexington Books, 2011.
- Nicoll, Allardyce. A History of English Drama 1660–1900: Volume III. Cambridge University Press, 2009.
- Hogan, C.B (ed.) The London Stage, 1660–1800: Volume V. Southern Illinois University Press, 1968.
