= John Johnson (architect, born 1732) =

English architect (1732–1814)

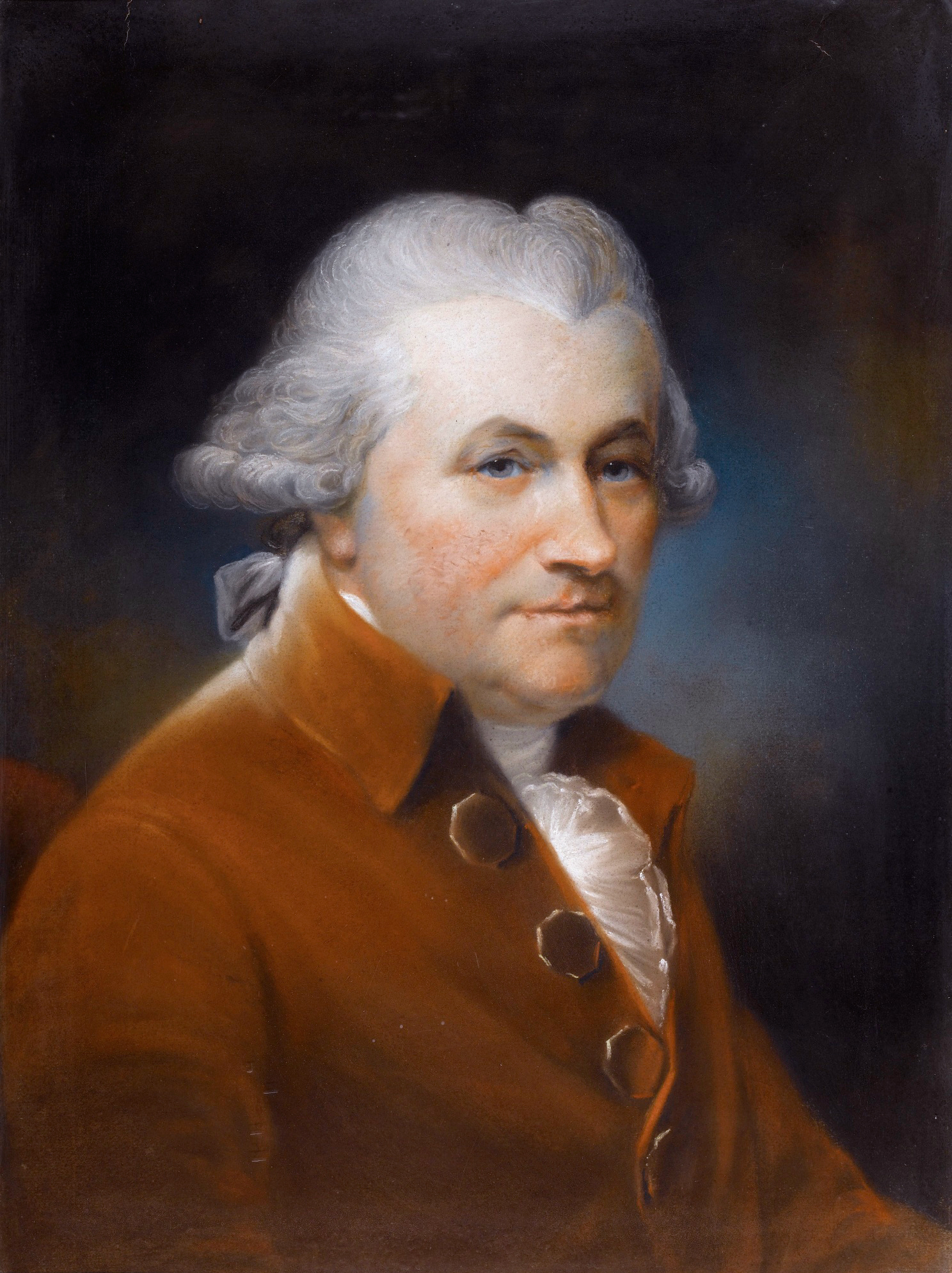
- John Johnson (painted by John Russell)
- Born: 22 April 1732; Leicester, England, Kingdom of Great Britain
- Died: 17 August 1814 (aged 82); Leicester, England, United Kingdom of Great Britain and Ireland
- Occupations: Architect and surveyor

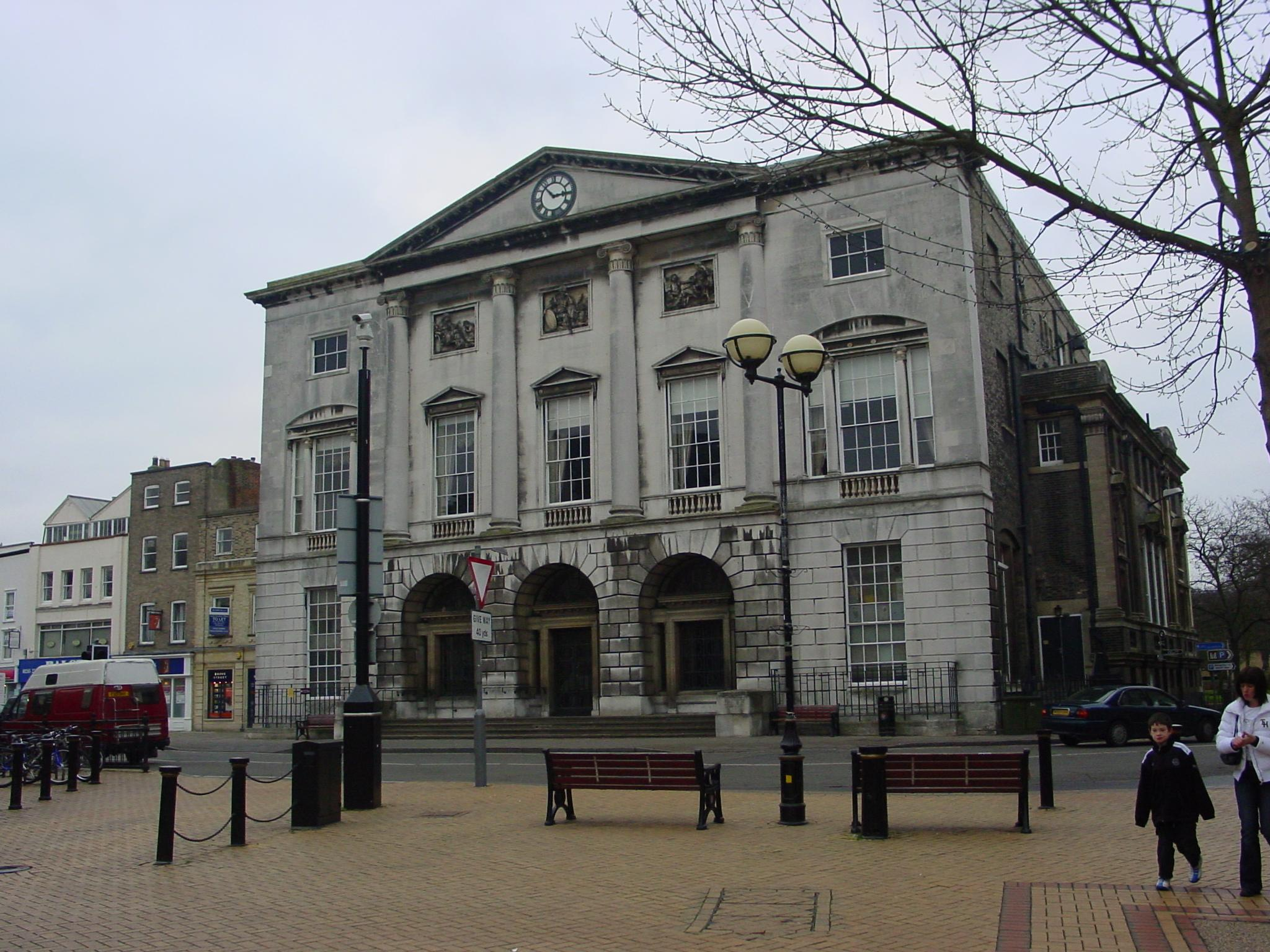
Shire Hall, Chelmsford

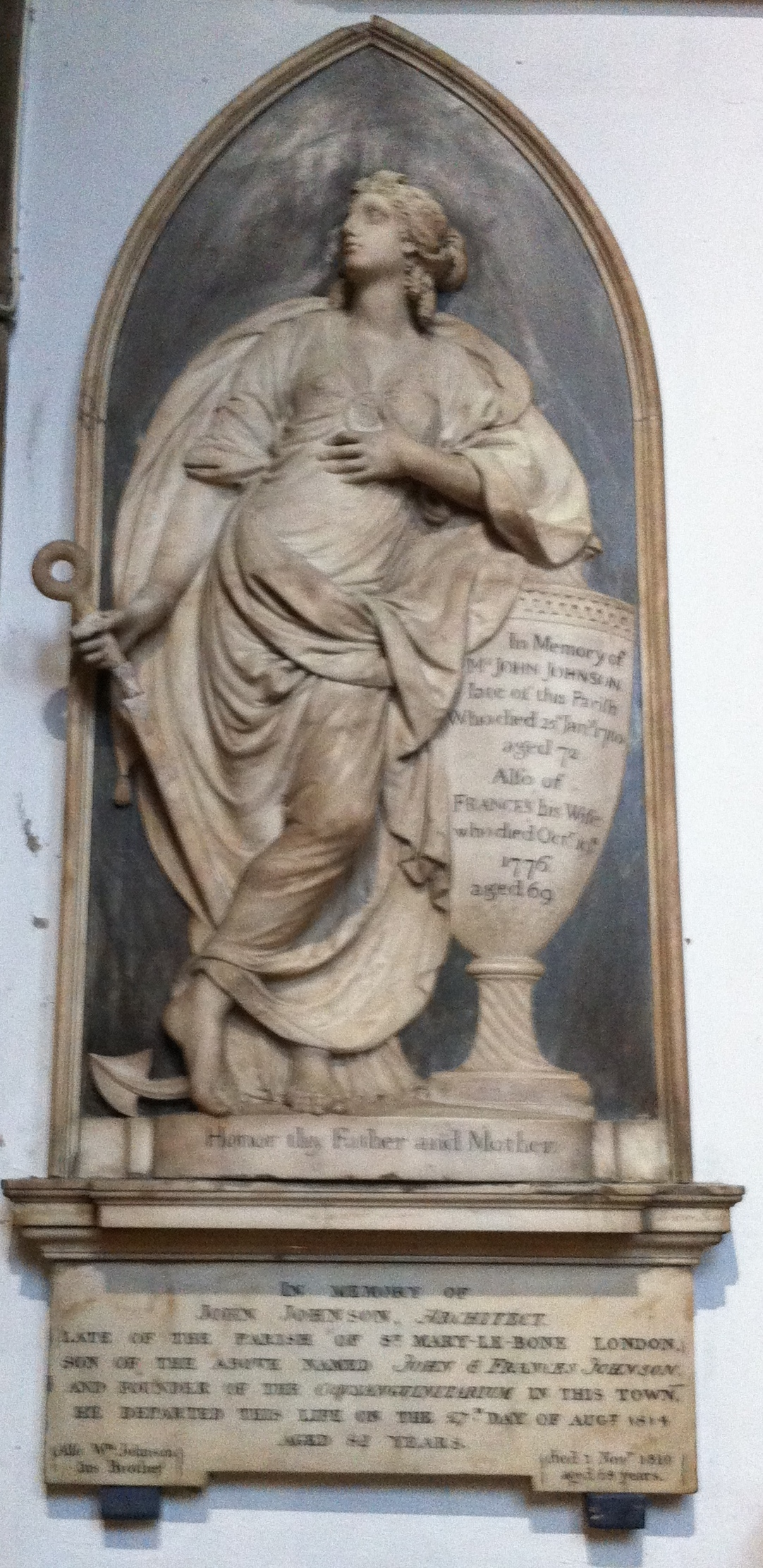
Memorial to John Johnson in Leicester Cathedral

John Johnson (22 April 1732 – 17 August 1814) was an English architect and surveyor to the county of Essex. He is best known for designing the Shire Hall, Chelmsford.

== Life ==
Johnson was born in Leicester. He moved to London before his thirtieth birthday and in the late 1760s was engaged by William Berners in speculative building of Berners' estate in Marylebone. For most of the rest of his life he lived in one of the houses that he had built in Berners Street. In 1782 he succeeded William Hillyer as Surveyor to the County of Essex, a position that he held for thirty years, retiring at the age of 80. In 1785 he became a partner with Sir Herbert Mackworth and others in Dorsett and Co, a bank in Bond Street, but Mackworth left before 1792, the bank failed in 1797 and was wound up in 1803. After this, Johnson moved from Berners Street to Camden Town, and on his retirement in 1812 returned to Leicester, where he died. He was buried in St Martin's Church (now Leicester Cathedral) where he is commemorated on the base of a monument by John Bacon, originally erected in 1786 as a memorial to his parents.

== Works ==
Among Johnson's surviving works are:

=== Public buildings ===
- The Jockey Club's clubhouse, Newmarket (1771–2)
- The Shire Hall, Chelmsford (1789–91)
- The City Rooms, Leicester (1799–1800)
- Ingrams Close, Felsted School (1799–1802)
- Chelmsford Cathedral (rebuilt the nave, 1801–03)
- St Andrew's Church, Hornchurch (rebuilt the south aisle, 1802)
- County Hall, Lewes (1808–12), which became Lewes Crown Court and is now Lewes Combined Court Centre

=== Country houses ===
- Castle Ashby (rebuilt the Great Hall, 1771-4)
- Terling Place, Essex (1772-c1780)
- Woolverstone Hall, Suffolk (1776)
- Bradwell Lodge, Essex (c.1785), reconstruction of an earlier house
- Benhall Lodge, Benhall, Suffolk (1790), only a fragment of this building remains as part of 'Old Lodge', as the house was totally rebuilt in the Regency period
- Hatfield Place, Hatfield Peverel, Essex (1791–5)

=== London houses ===
- Asia House, no. 63 (originally no. 9), New Cavendish Street, Marylebone (c1775-77)
- Galloway House, no. 29 Charles Street, (1775-6) with a 63 ft. frontage. For John Stewart, 7th Earl of Galloway. Demolished 1912. (British History online)

=== Other structures ===
- Stonebridge, Chelmsford
