= St Mary's Church, Burnham on Crouch =

Church in Burnham-on-Crouch, Essex, England

Coordinates: 51.638345°N 0.815007°E

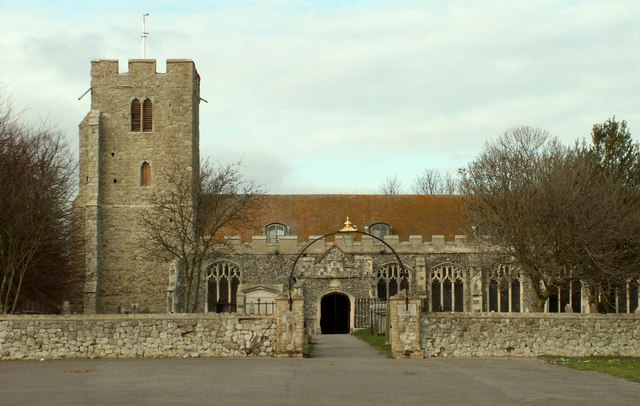
St Mary, Burnham-On-Crouch

St Mary's Church is a Church of England church in Burnham on Crouch, Essex. It is Grade II* listed
