= Morning Herald =

The Morning Herald was an early daily newspaper in the United Kingdom.

== History ==
The newspaper was founded in 1780 by the Reverend Sir Henry Bate Dudley, former editor of The Morning Post. It was initially a liberal paper aligned with the Prince of Wales, but later became aligned with the Tories. In 1843, it was bought by Edward Baldwin, then after his death in 1848 was acquired by James Johnstone, who also owned the Evening Standard. He differentiated the two newspapers by charging 4d a copy for the Herald and only 2d for the Standard. This was initially successful, and he briefly created the Evening Herald as a companion to the Morning Herald, but neither edition made a profit, the evening edition soon closing and the Morning Herald closing in 1869.

== Editors ==
1780: Henry Bate Dudley
1805: Stanley Lees Giffard
1846–1858 Robert Knox
