= Tiptree Priory =

Former Augustinian priory in Essex

Coordinates: 51.798408°N 0.718513°E

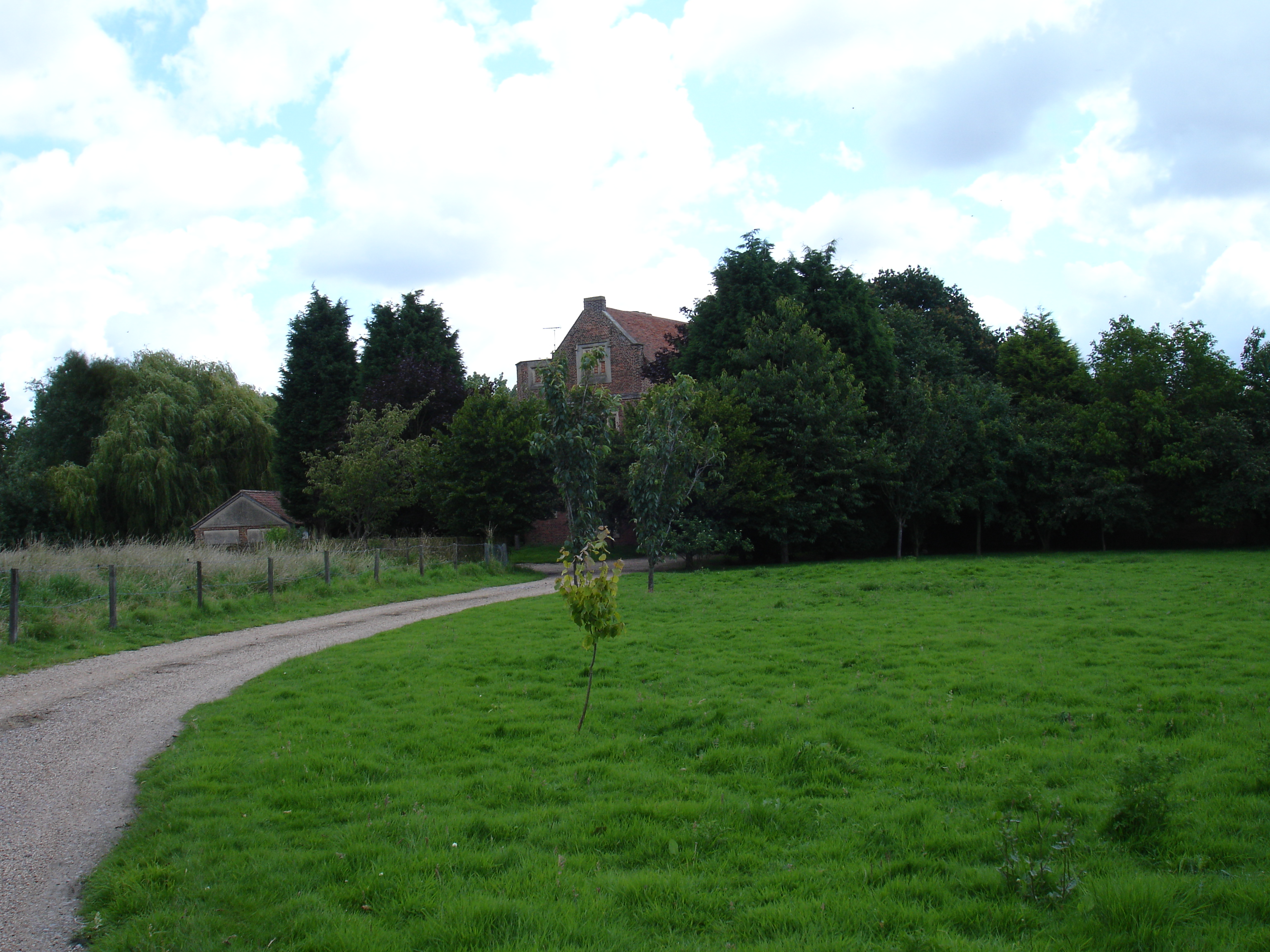
Tiptree Priory house

Tiptree Priory was a small Augustinian priory in Great Braxted, Essex, England and afterwards the name of the 16th century house built on the ruins.

The priory was founded in the 12th century by the local Tregoz family as a community of Augustinian Canons Regular. The priory church was dedicated to Saints Mary and Nicholas.

The priory was suppressed in 1525 as part of the Dissolution of the Monasteries by Henry VIII and granted initially to Cardinal Wolsey. In 1526 he granted it to Cardinals College, Oxford (now Christ Church) and then to his college at Ipswich. On Wolsey's downfall in 1530 it reverted to the Crown, who granted it to Edward Huddlestone. It was acquired in 1547 by Thomas Darcy, whose grandson Brian (High Sheriff of Essex in 1585) built the present house c.1570. This house was built in red brick in two storeys. The priory church was demolished. After passing down in the Darcy family for several generations, the property was sold and afterwards passed through a succession of unrelated hands.
