= Bradwell-on-Sea =

Village in Essex, England

Coordinates: 51.7234°N 0.8946°E

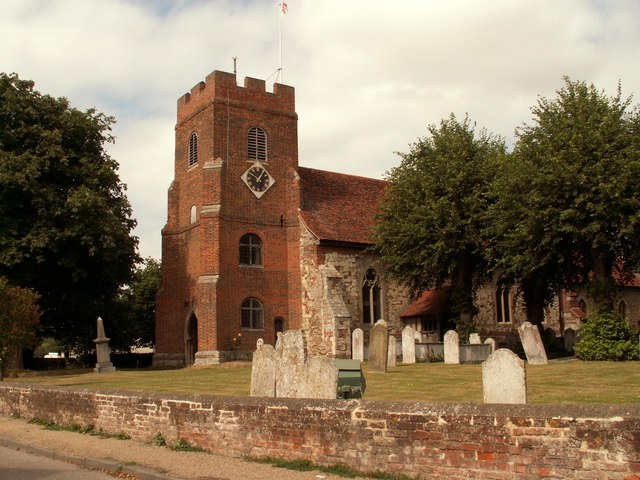
- St Thomas’ Church, Bradwell-on-Sea

- Location within Essex
- Population: 893 (Parish, 2021)
- OS grid reference: TM000067
- Civil parish: Bradwell-on-Sea
- District: Maldon
- Shire county: Essex
- Region: East
- Country: England
- Sovereign state: United Kingdom
- Post town: SOUTHMINSTER
- Postcode district: CM0
- Dialling code: 01621
- Police: Essex
- Fire: Essex
- Ambulance: East of England
- UK Parliament: Maldon

Bradwell-on-Sea is a village and civil parish in Essex, England; it is on the Dengie peninsula. It is located 5.6 mi (9.0 km) north-north-east of Southminster and is 19 mi (31 km) east of the county town of Chelmsford. The village is in the District of Maldon and in the parliamentary constituency of Maldon. At the 2021 census the parish had a population of 893.

== History ==
Bradwell-on-Sea was a Saxon Shore fort in Roman times known as Othona. The Anglo-Saxons originally called it Ithancester. Saint Cedd founded a monastery within the old walls in 653, which survives as the restored Chapel of St Peter-on-the-Wall, one of the oldest churches in Britain. From there, he continued the evangelisation of Essex.

In the 20th century, the village became known as the site for Bradwell nuclear power station this closed in 2002, and has now been decommissioned. It also has a school, St Cedd’s Church of England primary school and a sailing club.

The village has been called Bradwell juxta Mare (local pronunciation is same as in juxtaposition and a female horse; Latin pronunciation is yux-ta and mare-eh), Bradwell-next-the-Sea and Bradwell near the Sea.

Notable residents include the Tudor martyr Thomas Abel, the newspaper editor Sir Henry Bate Dudley, the artist Frederick Hans Haagensen, the MP Tom Driberg (later Baron Bradwell), who lived at Bradwell Lodge and who is buried in the churchyard.

The local newspaper is the Maldon and Burnham Standard. There is a Facebook page called The Bradwell News and gossip.

=== World War Two ===
During the Second World War the airfield sited to the north-east of Bradwell Waterside was a front-line station, and named RAF Bradwell Bay. Before the war a small grass airfield was sited there for refuelling and re-arming the aircraft used by pilots practising shooting and bombing at the ranges on nearby Dengie Marshes. In 1941 the airfield was enlarged, swallowing up the pre-war grass landing ground, and three concrete runways were laid down. As it was quite near the coast, and many aircraft in distress landed there, it had Fog Investigation and Dispersal Operation (FIDO) system installed to help pilots find a safe landing in foggy weather. Many night-fighter squadrons were based here, equipped first with the Douglas Havoc, then the de Havilland Mosquito, the ubiquitous multi-role-combat aircraft of its time. The airfield was also used as a jumping-off point for fighters escorting long-distance bombing raids on Germany, and such types as the Spitfire and North American Mustang could be seen. A recent memorial, in the shape of a crashed de Havilland Mosquito, has been placed near to the edge of the airfield to remember all those who lost their lives in defence of Britain in the war whilst based at RAF Bradwell Bay.

== See also ==
- Bradwell Waterside
- Bradwell nuclear power station
- Bradwell Shell Bank
- Dengie nature reserve
