= David Kynaston =

English historian and author (born 1951)

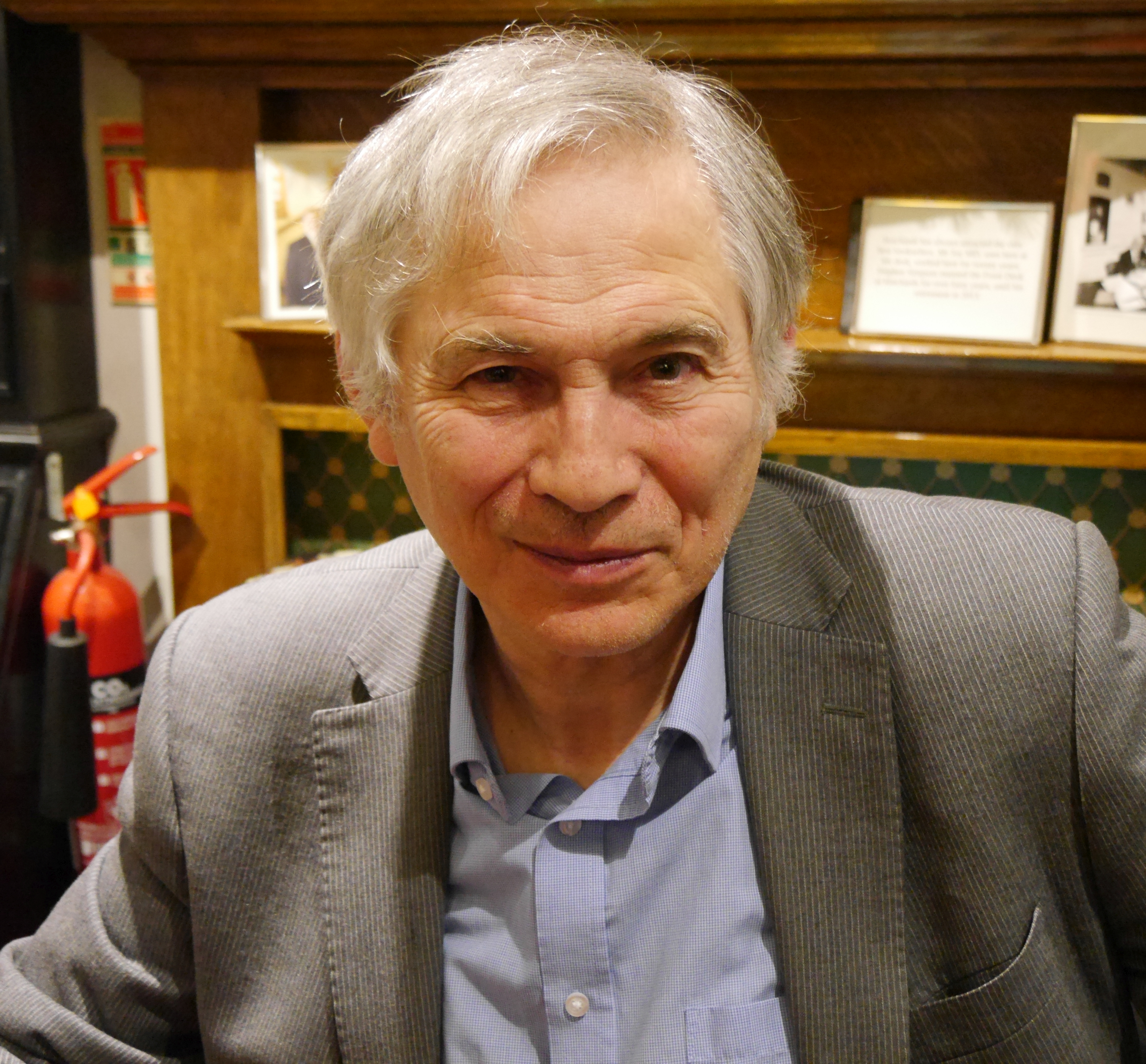
- David Kynaston, Hatchards, London, 2023
- Born: David Thomas Anthony Kynaston; 30 July 1951 (age 75); Aldershot, England

Academic background
- Education: Wellington College; University of Oxford (BA); London School of Economics (PhD)
- Thesis: The London Stock Exchange, 1870-1914 : an institutional history (1983)

Academic work
- Discipline: History
- Sub-discipline: English society
- Institutions: Kingston University

David Thomas Anthony Kynaston (/ˈkɪnəstən/; born 30 July 1951 in Aldershot, England) is an English historian specialising in the social history of England. He has written more than 30 books, including the first four books in his series Tales of a New Jerusalem, in which he chronicles the history of Great Britain from the end of World War II in 1945 to the accession of Margaret Thatcher in 1979. The first book in the series–Austerity Britain–was named "Book of the Decade" in 2009 by The Sunday Times.

== Education and academic career ==
Kynaston was educated at Wellington College, Berkshire and New College, Oxford, from which he graduated with a Bachelor of Arts degree in modern history in 1973. He was awarded a PhD from the London School of Economics for his 1983 thesis on the history of the London Stock Exchange. Kynaston became a visiting professor at Kingston University in 2001, and was elected a Fellow of the Royal Society of Literature in 2010.

== Tales of a New Jerusalem ==
In 2007, Kynaston published Austerity Britain, 1945–1951, to much acclaim. The book consists of two volumes–A World To Build and Smoke In the Valley–that together constitute the first in a projected series of six books entitled Tales of a New Jerusalem, chronicling the history of Great Britain from the end of World War II in 1945 to the accession of Margaret Thatcher in 1979. Austerity Britain was named "Book of the Decade" by The Sunday Times.

Family Britain (2010) is the second book in the series, covering the period from 1951 to the Suez Crisis of 1956, and was released as a single volume containing two parts–The Certainties Of Place and A Thicker Cut. It was Book of the Week on BBC Radio 4 for the week of 23 November 2009, read by Dominic West.

The third book in the series, Modernity Britain, covering the years 1957–62, was published as two volumes–Opening The Box in June 2013 and A Shake Of The Dice in 2014.

The first volume of the fourth book, A Northern Wind, covering the years 1962–65, was published on 28 September 2023. The second volume, Deep into the Sixties, covering 1965–66, was published on 24 September 2026.

== Publications ==
As of October 2026, Kynaston has authored over 30 books either alone or jointly with other authors.

- King Labour: British Working Class, 1850–1914, 1976, ISBN 978-0-429-78620-4
- Shots In The Dark: A Diary of Saturday Dreams and Strange Times, 1978, ISBN 978-1-5266-2302-7
- The Secretary of State, 1978, ISBN 978-0-900963-80-3
- The Chancellor of the Exchequer, 1980, ISBN 978-0-900963-97-1
- Bobby Abel: Professional Batsman, 1857–1936, 1982, ISBN 978-0-436-23951-9
- Archie's Last Stand: M.C.C. in New Zealand 1922–23: Being an Account of Mr. A. C. MacLaren's tour and His Last Stand, 1984, ISBN 978-0-356-10548-2
- The Financial Times: a centenary history, 1988, ISBN 978-0-670-81295-0
- WG's Birthday Party, 1990, ISBN 978-0-7011-3496-9
- Cazenove & Co.: a history, 1991, ISBN 978-0-7134-6059-9
- The City of London, Volume I: A World of Its Own, 1815–90, 1995, ISBN 978-1-4481-1229-6
- The City of London, Volume II: Golden Years, 1890–1914, 1995, ISBN 978-1-4481-1230-2
- LIFFE: A Market and its Makers, 1997, ISBN 978-1-85757-056-4
- The City of London, Volume III: Illusions of Gold, 1914–45, 1999, ISBN 978-1-4481-1231-9
- Phillips and Drew: Professionals in the City (with William Joseph Reader), 2001, ISBN 978-0-7090-6292-9
- City State: A Contemporary History of the City and How Money Triumphed (with Richard Roberts), 2001, ISBN 978-1-84765-043-6
- The City of London, Volume IV: Club No More (with Will Sulkin), 1945–2000, 2002, ISBN 978-1-4481-1232-6
- The Bank of England: Money, Power, and Influence 1694–1994, 2002 (editor, with Richard Roberts, ISBN 978-0-19-828952-4
- City of London, 1815-2000, 2004, ISBN 978-1-4481-1472-6
- Austerity Britain, 1945–51, 2007, ISBN 978-1-4088-0907-5, reprinted as:
  - Austerity Britain: A World to Build, 1945–48, 2008, ISBN 978-0-7475-8540-4
  - Austerity Britain: Smoke in the Valley, 1948–51, 2008, ISBN 978-0-7475-9228-0
- Family Britain, 1951–57, 2009, ISBN 978-1-4088-0349-3
- City of London: The History, 2012, ISBN 978-1-4481-1472-6
- Modernity Britain, 1957–62, 2012, ISBN 978-1-4088-4438-0, reprinted as:
  - Modernity Britain: Opening the Box, 1957–59, 2013, ISBN 978-0-7475-8893-1
  - Modernity Britain: A Shake of the Dice, 1959–62, 2014, ISBN 978-1-4088-4440-3
- The Lion Wakes: A Modern History of HSBC (with Richard Roberts), 2015, 978-1847658975
- Till Time's Last Sand: A History of the Bank of England 1694–2013, 2017, ISBN 978-1-4088-6858-4
- Arlott, Swanton and the Soul of English Cricket (with Stephen Fay), 2018, ISBN 978-1-4088-9539-9
- Engines of Privilege: Britain's private school problem (with Francis Greenwood), 2019, ISBN 978-1-5266-0127-8
- London's Square Mile: A Secret City (with Polly Braden), 2019, ISBN 978-1-910566-44-2
- On the Cusp: Days of '62, 2021, ISBN 978-1-5266-3202-9
- Banker and Philanthropist: A Portrait of Anthony de Rothschild, 2022, ISBN 978-0-903696-56-2
- A Northern Wind: Britain 1962–65, 2023, ISBN 978-1-5266-5756-5
- Richie Benaud's Blue Suede Shoes: The Story of an Ashes Classic (with Harry Ricketts), 2024, ISBN 978-1-5266-7030-4
- Deep into the Sixties: Britain 1965–66, 2026, ISBN 978-1-5266-5759-6
