= Broadwell =

Broadwell may refer to:

== Places ==
=== England ===
- Broadwell, Oxfordshire
  - RAF Broadwell
- Broadwell, Warwickshire
- Broadwell, Cotswold, Gloucestershire
- Broadwell, Forest of Dean, Gloucestershire

=== United States ===
- Broadwell, Illinois
- Broadwell Township, Logan County, Illinois
- Broadwell, Kentucky

== Other uses ==
- Broadwell (microarchitecture), an Intel microarchitecture codename
- Broadwell (surname)

== See also ==
- Broadwell Ring, a small ring in French and German artillery
- Bradwell (disambiguation)
