= Bradwell =

Bradwell may refer to:

== Places ==
=== England ===
- Bradwell, Devon
- Bradwell, Derbyshire, a village in the Derbyshire Peak District
- Bradwell, Norfolk, Great Yarmouth
- Bradwell, Staffordshire

==== Buckinghamshire ====
- Bradwell and New Bradwell; each a village, district and civil parish now part of Milton Keynes
- Bradwell Abbey, an ancient monument in Milton Keynes

==== Essex ====
- Bradwell Juxta Coggeshall, a village and civil parish in Essex, England
- Bradwell-on-Sea, a village and civil parish
- Bradwell Waterside, a small hamlet
- Bradwell nuclear power station

=== North America ===
- Bradwell, Saskatchewan, a village in Canada
- Bradwell Reservoir, a reservoir in Saskatchewan, Canada
- Bradwell Bay Wilderness, a designated wilderness area in the state of Oklahoma, US

== People ==
- Tom Driberg, Baron Bradwell (1905–1976), British journalist and politician
- Chris Bradwell (born 1983), US athlete
- James B. Bradwell (1828–1907), US lawyer and judge
- Mike Bradwell (born 1986), Canadian athlete
- Mike Bradwell (theatre director) (1948–2025), British theatre director and playwright
- Myra Bradwell (1831–1894), US publisher and political activist
- Oliver Bradwell (born 1992), US athlete

== Other uses ==
- Bradwell Institute, a public high school in Hinesville, Georgia, US
- Bradwell (car), a cyclecar by the British manufacturer Bradwell & Company
- Bradwell Episcopal Area, an episcopal area within the Diocese of Chelmsford.

== See also ==
- Broadwell (disambiguation)
