= Core M =

Core M may refer to:

- A class of processors based on the Skylake microarchitecture
- A class of processors based on the Broadwell microarchitecture

== See also ==
- List of Intel Core M microprocessors
