= Broadwell (surname) =

Broadwell is a surname, probably derived from placenames in Britain. Notable people with the surname include:

- Cyrus Broadwell (1801–1879), builder of Cyrus Broadwell House
- Lewis Wells Broadwell (1820–1906), American engineer and inventor of firearms and artillery components
- Lucina C. Broadwell (c. 1890–1919), American murder victim
- Robert Broadwell (fl. 1919), director of The Great Radium Mystery
- James Eugene Broadwell (1921–2018), American aeronautical engineer
- Charles Broadwell (fl. 2000s), publisher of The Fayetteville Observer
- Paula Broadwell (fl. 2012), American biographer of Gen. David Petraeus

== Fictional characters ==
- Amanda Broadwell, in web series The Cavanaughs
