= 6800K =

6800K may refer to:

- AMD A10-6800K, CPU released in 2013
- Intel Core i7-6800K, CPU released in 2016
