= List of Intel Xeon processors (Broadwell-based) =

== "Broadwell-DE" (14 nm) ==
- All models support: MMX, SSE, SSE2, SSE3, SSSE3, SSE4.1, SSE4.2, AVX, F16C, Enhanced Intel SpeedStep Technology (EIST), Intel 64, XD bit (an NX bit implementation), TXT, Intel VT-x, Intel EPT, Intel VT-d, Hyper-threading, Turbo Boost (except D-1518, D-1529), AES-NI, Smart Cache, ECC memory.
- SoC peripherals include 8× USB (4× 2.0, 4× 3.0), 6× SATA, 2× Integrated 10 GbE LAN, UART, GPIO, and 32 lanes of PCI Express (8× 2.0, 24× 3.0), in ×16, ×8 and ×4 configurations.
- Support for up to four DIMMs of DDR4 or DDR3L memory per CPU socket.

=== Xeon D-15xx (uniprocessor, SoC) ===
| Model number | sSpec number | Cores | Frequency | Turbo | L2 cache | L3 cache | TDP | Socket | I/O bus | Memory | Release date | Part number(s) | Release price (USD) |
|---|---|---|---|---|---|---|---|---|---|---|---|---|---|
Quad Core
| Xeon D-1513N | SR3KV (A1) | 4 | 1.6 GHz | 2.2 GHz | 4 × 256 KB | 6 MB | 35 W | FC-BGA 1667 | DMI 2.0 | 2× DDR4-2133; 2× DDR3L-1600 | July 2017 | GG8068203255106 | $192 |
| Xeon D-1518 | SR2DN (V2) | 4 | 2.2 GHz | —N/a | 4 × 256 KB | 6 MB | 35 W | FC-BGA 1667 | DMI 2.0 | 2× DDR4-2133; 2× DDR3L-1600 | November 2015 | GG8067402569700 | $234 |
| Xeon D-1520 | SR29B (V1) | 4 | 2.2 GHz | 2.6 GHz | 4 × 256 KB | 6 MB | 45 W | FC-BGA 1667 | DMI 2.0 | 2× DDR4-2133; 2× DDR3L-1600 | March 2015 | GG8067401741800 | $199 |
| Xeon D-1521 | SR2DF (V2) | 4 | 2.4 GHz | 2.7 GHz | 4 × 256 KB | 6 MB | 45 W | FC-BGA 1667 | DMI 2.0 | 2× DDR4-2133; 2× DDR3L-1600 | November 2015 | GG8067402568800 | $199 |
| Xeon D-1523N | SR3KU (A1) | 4 | 2 GHz | 2.6 GHz | 4 × 256 KB | 6 MB | 45 W | FC-BGA 1667 | DMI 2.0 | 2× DDR4-2133; 2× DDR3L-1600 | July 2017 | GG8068203255105 | $256 |
| Xeon D-1527 | SR2DK (V2) | 4 | 2.2 GHz | 2.7 GHz | 4 × 256 KB | 6 MB | 35 W | FC-BGA 1667 | DMI 2.0 | 2× DDR4-2133; 2× DDR3L-1600 | November 2015 | GG8067402569400 | $259 |
| Xeon D-1529 | SR2DR (V2) | 4 | 1.3 GHz | —N/a | 4 × 256 KB | 6 MB | 20 W | FC-BGA 1667 | DMI 2.0 | 2× DDR4-2133; 2× DDR3L-1600 | April 2016 | GG8067402570001 | $324 |
Six Core
| Xeon D-1528 | SR2DL (V2) | 6 | 1.9 GHz | 2.5 GHz | 6 × 256 KB | 9 MB | 35 W | FC-BGA 1667 | DMI 2.0 | 2× DDR4-2133; 2× DDR3L-1600 | November 2015 | GG8067402569500 | $389 |
| Xeon D-1531 | SR2DG (V2) | 6 | 2.2 GHz | 2.7 GHz | 6 × 256 KB | 9 MB | 45 W | FC-BGA 1667 | DMI 2.0 | 2× DDR4-2133; 2× DDR3L-1600 | November 2015 | GG8067402568900 | $348 |
| Xeon D-1533N | SR3KS (A1) | 6 | 2.1 GHz | 2.7 GHz | 6 × 256 KB | 9 MB | 45 W | FC-BGA 1667 | DMI 2.0 | 2× DDR4-2133; 2× DDR3L-1600 | July 2017 | GG8068203255103 | $470 |
Eight Core
| Xeon D-1537 | SR2GF (V2) | 8 | 1.7 GHz | 2.3 GHz | 8 × 256 KB | 12 MB | 35 W | FC-BGA 1667 | DMI 2.0 | 2× DDR4-2133; 2× DDR3L-1600 | November 2015 | GG8067402612700 | $571 |
| Xeon D-1539 | SR2DH (V2) | 8 | 1.6 GHz | 2.2 GHz | 8 × 256 KB | 12 MB | 35 W | FC-BGA 1667 | DMI 2.0 | 2× DDR4-2133; 2× DDR3L-1600 | April 2016 | GG8067402569000 | $590 |
| Xeon D-1540 | SR29A (V1) | 8 | 2 GHz | 2.6 GHz | 8 × 256 KB | 12 MB | 45 W | FC-BGA 1667 | DMI 2.0 | 2× DDR4-2133; 2× DDR3L-1600 | March 2015 | GG8067401635553 | $581 |
| Xeon D-1541 | SR2DE (V2) | 8 | 2.1 GHz | 2.7 GHz | 8 × 256 KB | 12 MB | 45 W | FC-BGA 1667 | DMI 2.0 | 2× DDR4-2133; 2× DDR3L-1600 | November 2015 | GG8067402568700 | $581 |
| Xeon D-1543N | SR3KW (A1) | 8 | 1.9 GHz | 2.5 GHz | 8 × 256 KB | 12 MB | 45 W | FC-BGA 1667 | DMI 2.0 | 2× DDR4-2133; 2× DDR3L-1600 | July 2017 | GG8068203255107 | $652 |
| Xeon D-1548 | SR2DJ (V2) | 8 | 2 GHz | 2.6 GHz | 8 × 256 KB | 12 MB | 45 W | FC-BGA 1667 | DMI 2.0 | 2× DDR4-2133; 2× DDR3L-1600 | November 2015 | GG8067402569300 | $675 |
| Xeon D-1553N | SR3KT (A1) | 8 | 2.3 GHz | 2.7 GHz | 8 × 256 KB | 12 MB | 65 W | FC-BGA 1667 | DMI 2.0 | 2× DDR4-2133; 2× DDR3L-1600 | July 2017 | GG8068203255104 | $855 |
Twelve Core
| Xeon D-1557 | SR2M4 (Y0) | 12 | 1.5 GHz | 2.1 GHz | 12 × 256 KB | 18 MB | 45 W | FC-BGA 1667 | DMI 2.0 | 2× DDR4-2133; 2× DDR3L-1600 | March 2016 | GG8067402570702 | $844 |
| Xeon D-1559 | SR2M5 (Y0) | 12 | 1.5 GHz | 2.1 GHz | 12 × 256 KB | 18 MB | 45 W | FC-BGA 1667 | DMI 2.0 | 2× DDR4-2133; 2× DDR3L-1600 | April 2016 | GG8067402570801 | $883 |
| Xeon D-1567 | SR2M3 (Y0) | 12 | 2.1 GHz | 2.7 GHz | 12 × 256 KB | 18 MB | 65 W | FC-BGA 1667 | DMI 2.0 | 2× DDR4-2133; 2× DDR3L-1600 | March 2016 | GG8067402570603 | $1299 |
Sixteen Core
| Xeon D-1571 | SR2M0 (Y0) | 16 | 1.3 GHz | 2.1 GHz | 16 × 256 KB | 24 MB | 45 W | FC-BGA 1667 | DMI 2.0 | 2× DDR4-2133; 2× DDR3L-1600 | February 2016 | GG8067402570310 | $1222 |
| Xeon D-1577 | SR2M2 (Y0) | 16 | 1.3 GHz | 2.1 GHz | 16 × 256 KB | 24 MB | 45 W | FC-BGA 1667 | DMI 2.0 | 2× DDR4-2133; 2× DDR3L-1600 | February 2016 | GG8067402570503 | $1477 |
| Xeon D-1581 | SR2LZ (Y0) | 16 | 1.8 GHz | 2.4 GHz | 16 × 256 KB | 24 MB | 65 W | FC-BGA 1667 | DMI 2.0 | 2× DDR4-2133; 2× DDR3L-1600 | Q1 2016 | GG8067402570204 | OEM |
| Xeon D-1587 | SR2M1 (Y0) | 16 | 1.7 GHz | 2.3 GHz | 16 × 256 KB | 24 MB | 65 W | FC-BGA 1667 | DMI 2.0 | 2× DDR4-2133; 2× DDR3L-1600 | February 2016 | GG8067402570403 | $1754 |

== "Hewitt Lake" (14 nm) ==
=== Xeon D-16xx (uniprocessor, SoC) ===
| Model number | sSpec number | Cores (threads) | Frequency | Turbo Boost all-core/2.0 (/max. 3.0) | L2 cache | L3 cache | TDP | Socket | I/O bus | Memory | Release date | Part number(s) | Release price (USD) |
|---|---|---|---|---|---|---|---|---|---|---|---|---|---|
Edge Server and Cloud
| Xeon D-1602 | SRG05 (A1) | 2 (4) | 2.5 GHz | 2.8/3.2 GHz | 0.5 MB | 3 MB | 27 W | FC-BGA 1667 | DMI 3.0 | 2× DDR4-2133 | April 2019 | GG8068204236502 | $106 |
| Xeon D-1622 | SRG08 (A1) | 4 (8) | 2.6 GHz | 2.9/3.2 GHz | 1.0 MB | 6 MB | 40 W | FC-BGA 1667 | DMI 3.0 | 2× DDR4-2133 | April 2019 | GG8068204236902 | $170 |
Integrated Intel Network
| Xeon D-1627 | SRG09 (A1) | 4 (8) | 2.9 GHz | 3.2/3.2 GHz | 1.0 MB | 6 MB | 45 W | FC-BGA 1667 | DMI 3.0 | 2× DDR4-2133 | April 2019 | GG8068204237001 | $202 |
| Xeon D-1637 | SRG0A (A1) | 6 (12) | 2.9 GHz | 3.2/3.2 GHz | 1.5 MB | 9 MB | 55 W | FC-BGA 1667 | DMI 3.0 | 2× DDR4-2400 | April 2019 | GG8068204237101 | $406 |
Integrated Intel Network and QuickAssist Technology
| Xeon D-1623N | SRG07 (A1) | 4 (8) | 2.4 GHz | 2.7/3.2 GHz | 1.0 MB | 6 MB | 35 W | FC-BGA 1667 | DMI 3.0 | 2× DDR4-1866 | April 2019 | GG8068204236801 | $256 |
| Xeon D-1633N | SRG0B (A1) | 6 (12) | 2.5 GHz | 2.8/3.2 GHz | 1.5 MB | 9 MB | 45 W | FC-BGA 1667 | DMI 3.0 | 2× DDR4-2133 | April 2019 | GG8068204237201 | $470 |
| Xeon D-1649N | SRG0D (A1) | 8 (16) | 2.3 GHz | 2.5/3.0 GHz | 2.0 MB | 12 MB | 45 W | FC-BGA 1667 | DMI 3.0 | 2× DDR4-2133 | April 2019 | GG8068204237401 | $705 |
| Xeon D-1653N | SRG04 (A1) | 8 (16) | 2.8 GHz | 3.1/3.2 GHz | 2.0 MB | 12 MB | 65 W | FC-BGA 1667 | DMI 3.0 | 2× DDR4-2400 | April 2019 | GG8068204235902 | $748 |

== "Broadwell-H" (14 nm) ==
- All models support: MMX, SSE, SSE2, SSE3, SSSE3, SSE4.1, SSE4.2, AVX, F16C, Enhanced Intel SpeedStep Technology (EIST), Intel 64, XD bit (an NX bit implementation), TXT, Intel VT-x, Intel EPT, Intel VT-d, Hyper-threading, Turbo Boost, AES-NI, Smart Cache, ECC memory.
- Support for up to four DIMMs of DDR3L memory per CPU socket.

=== Xeon E3-12xx v4 (uniprocessor) ===
| Model number | sSpec number | Cores | Frequency | Turbo | L2 cache | L3 cache | GPU model | GPU frequency | TDP | Socket | I/O bus | Release date | Part number(s) | Release price (USD) |
|---|---|---|---|---|---|---|---|---|---|---|---|---|---|---|
Quad Core
| Xeon E3-1285 v4 | SR2CX (G0) | 4 | 3.5 GHz | 3.8 GHz | 4 × 256 KB | 6 MB | Iris Pro Graphics P6300 | 300–1150 MHz | 95 W | LGA 1150 | DMI 2.0 | June 2015 | CM8065802482701 | $557 |
Quad Core, low power
| Xeon E3-1258L v4 | SR2E9 (G0) | 4 | 1.8 GHz | 3.2 GHz | 4 × 256 KB | 6 MB | HD Graphics P5700 | 700–1000 MHz | 47 W | BGA-1364 | DMI 2.0 | June 2015 | FH8065802420602 | $481 |
| Xeon E3-1265L v4 | SR2B3 (G0) | 4 | 2.3 GHz | 3.3 GHz | 4 × 256 KB | 6 MB | Iris Pro Graphics P6300 | 300–1050 MHz | 35 W | LGA 1150 | DMI 2.0 | June 2015 | CM8065802483001 | $418 |
| Xeon E3-1270L v4 | SR2AZ (G0) | 4 | 3 GHz | 3.6 GHz | 4 × 256 KB | 6 MB | —N/a | —N/a | 45 W | LGA 1150 | DMI 2.0 | | CM8065802482501 | OEM |
| Xeon E3-1278L v4 | SR2E7 (G0) | 4 | 2 GHz | 3.3 GHz | 4 × 256 KB | 6 MB | Iris Pro Graphics P6300 | 800–1000 MHz | 47 W | BGA-1364 | DMI 2.0 | June 2015 | FH8065802420303 | $546 |
| Xeon E3-1283L v4 | SR2EA (G0) | 4 | 2.9 GHz | 3.8 GHz | 4 × 256 KB | 6 MB | Iris Pro Graphics P6300 | 300-1150 MHz | 47 W | BGA-1364 | DMI 2.0 | | FH8065802483704 | OEM |
| Xeon E3-1284L v4 | SR2B4 (G0) | 4 | 2.9 GHz | 3.8 GHz | 4 × 256 KB | 6 MB | Iris Pro Graphics P6300 | 300–1150 MHz | 47 W | LGA 1150 | DMI 2.0 | June 2015 | FH8065802483703 | OEM |
| Xeon E3-1285L v4 | SR2B1 (G0) | 4 | 3.4 GHz | 3.8 GHz | 4 × 256 KB | 6 MB | Iris Pro Graphics P6300 | 300–1150 MHz | 65 W | LGA 1150 | DMI 2.0 | June 2015 | CM8065802482901 | $445 |

== "Broadwell-EP" (14 nm) ==
- All models support: MMX, SSE, SSE2, SSE3, SSSE3, SSE4.1, SSE4.2, AVX, AVX2, FMA3, F16C, Enhanced Intel SpeedStep Technology (EIST), Intel 64, XD bit (an NX bit implementation), Intel VT-x, Intel VT-d, Hyper-threading (except E5-2603v4, 2609v4 and 4627v4), Turbo Boost 2.0 (except E5-1603v4, 1607v4, 2603v4, 2609v4 and 4610v4), AES-NI, Smart Cache.
- Transistors: Up to 10 cores: 3.20 billion, Up to 15 cores: 4.70 billion, Up to 24 cores: 7.20 billion
- Die size: Up to 10 cores: 246 mm^{2}, Up to 15 cores: 306 mm^{2}, Up to 24 cores: 456 mm^{2}
- Support for up to twelve DIMMs of DDR4 memory per CPU socket.

=== Xeon E5-16xx v4 (uniprocessor) ===
| Model number | sSpec number | Cores | Frequency | Turbo | L2 cache | L3 cache | TDP | Socket | I/O bus | Memory | Release date | Part number(s) | Release price (USD) |
|---|---|---|---|---|---|---|---|---|---|---|---|---|---|
Quad Core
| Xeon E5-1603 v4 | SR2PG (R0) | 4 | 2.8 GHz | —N/a | 4 × 256 KB | 10 MB | 140 W | LGA 2011-3 | DMI 2.0 | 4× DDR4-2133 | June 2016 | CM8066002395400 | OEM |
| Xeon E5-1607 v4 | SR2PH (R0) | 4 | 3.1 GHz | —N/a | 4 × 256 KB | 10 MB | 140 W | LGA 2011-3 | DMI 2.0 | 4× DDR4-2133 | June 2016 | CM8066002395500 | OEM |
| Xeon E5-1620 v4 | SR2P6 (R0) | 4 | 3.5 GHz | 1/?/?/3 | 4 × 256 KB | 10 MB | 140 W | LGA 2011-3 | DMI 2.0 | 4× DDR4-2400 | June 2016 | CM8066002044103; BX80660E51620V4 | $294 |
| Xeon E5-1630 v4 | SR2PF (R0) | 4 | 3.7 GHz | 1/1/3/3 | 4 × 256 KB | 10 MB | 140 W | LGA 2011-3 | DMI 2.0 | 4× DDR4-2400 | June 2016 | CM8066002395300 | $406 |
Six Core
| Xeon E5-1650 v4 | SR2P7 (R0) | 6 | 3.6 GHz | 2/2/2/2/4/4 | 6 × 256 KB | 15 MB | 140 W | LGA 2011-3 | DMI 2.0 | 4× DDR4-2400 | June 2016 | CM8066002044306; BX80660E51650V4 | $617 |
Eight Core
| Xeon E5-1660 v4 | SR2PK (R0) | 8 | 3.2 GHz | 2/?/?/?/?/?/?/6 | 8 × 256 KB | 20 MB | 140 W | LGA 2011-3 | DMI 2.0 | 4× DDR4-2400 | June 2016 | CM8066002646401 | $1113 |
| Xeon E5-1680 v4 | SR2P8 (R0) | 8 | 3.4 GHz | 2/?/?/?/?/?/?/6 | 8 × 256 KB | 20 MB | 140 W | LGA 2011-3 | DMI 2.0 | 4× DDR4-2400 | June 2016 | CM8066002044401 | $1723 |

=== Xeon E5-26xx v4 (dual-processor) ===
| Model number | sSpec number | Cores | Frequency | Turbo | L2 cache | L3 cache | TDP | Socket | I/O bus | Memory | Release date | Part number(s) | Release price (USD) |
|---|---|---|---|---|---|---|---|---|---|---|---|---|---|
Quad Core
| Xeon E5-2623 v4 | SR2PJ (R0) | 4 | 2.6 GHz | 2/4/6/6 | 4 × 256 KB | 10 MB | 85 W | LGA 2011-3 | 2× 8.0 GT/s QPI | 4× DDR4-2133 | April 2016 | CM8066002402400 | $444 |
| Xeon E5-2637 v4 | SR2P3 (R0) | 4 | 3.5 GHz | 1/1/2/2 | 4 × 256 KB | 15 MB | 135 W | LGA 2011-3 | 2× 9.6 GT/s QPI | 4× DDR4-2400 | April 2016 | CM8066002041100 | $996 |
Six Core
| Xeon E5-2603 v4 | SR2P0 (R0) | 6 | 1.7 GHz | —N/a | 6 × 256 KB | 15 MB | 85 W | LGA 2011-3 | 2× 6.4 GT/s QPI | 4× DDR4-1866 | April 2016 | BX80660E52603V4; CM8066002032805 | $213 |
| Xeon E5-2643 v4 | SR2P4 (R0) | 6 | 3.4 GHz | 2/2/2/2/3/3 | 6 × 256 KB | 20 MB | 135 W | LGA 2011-3 | 2× 9.6 GT/s QPI | 4× DDR4-2400 | April 2016 | CM8066002041500 | $1552 |
Eight Core
| Xeon E5-2608L v4 | SR2P9 (R0) | 8 | 1.6 GHz | 1/1/1/1/1/1/1/1 | 8 × 256 KB | 20 MB | 50 W | LGA 2011-3 | 2× 6.4 GT/s QPI | 4× DDR4-1866 | April 2016 | CM8066002045102 | $363 |
| Xeon E5-2609 v4 | SR2P1 (R0) | 8 | 1.7 GHz | —N/a | 8 × 256 KB | 20 MB | 85 W | LGA 2011-3 | 2× 6.4 GT/s QPI | 4× DDR4-1866 | April 2016 | BX80660E52609V4; CM8066002032901 | $306 |
| Xeon E5-2620 v4 | SR2R6 (R0) | 8 | 2.1 GHz | 2/3/4/5/6/7/9/9 | 8 × 256 KB | 20 MB | 85 W | LGA 2011-3 | 2× 8.0 GT/s QPI | 4× DDR4-2133 | April 2016 | BX80660E52620V4; CM8066002032201 | $417 |
| Xeon E5-2667 v4 | SR2P5 (R0) | 8 | 3.2 GHz | 3/3/3/3/3/3/4/4 | 8 × 256 KB | 25 MB | 135 W | LGA 2011-3 | 2× 9.6 GT/s QPI | 4× DDR4-2400 | April 2016 | CM8066002041900 | $2057 |
| Xeon E5-2689A v4 | SR2KZ | 8 | 3.4 GHz | 1/?/?/?/?/?/?/2 | 8 × 256 KB | 20 MB | 145 W | LGA 2011-3 | 2× 9.6 GT/s QPI | 4× DDR4-2400 | 2016 | CM8066002810500 | OEM |
Ten Core
| Xeon E5-2618L v4 | SR2PE (R0) | 10 | 2.2 GHz | 2/2/3/4/5/6/7/8/10/10 | 10 × 256 KB | 25 MB | 75 W | LGA 2011-3 | 2× 8.0 GT/s QPI | 4× DDR4-2133 | April 2016 | CM8066002061300 | $779 |
| Xeon E5-2630 v4 | SR2R7 (R0) | 10 | 2.2 GHz | 2/2/2/3/4/5/6/7/9/9 | 10 × 256 KB | 25 MB | 85 W | LGA 2011-3 | 2× 8.0 GT/s QPI | 4× DDR4-2133 | April 2016 | BX80660E52630V4; CM8066002032301 | $667 |
| Xeon E5-2630L v4 | SR2P2 (R0) | 10 | 1.8 GHz | 2/3/4/5/6/7/8/9/11/11 | 10 × 256 KB | 25 MB | 55 W | LGA 2011-3 | 2× 8.0 GT/s QPI | 4× DDR4-2133 | April 2016 | CM8066002033202 | $612 |
| Xeon E5-2640 v4 | SR2NZ (R0) | 10 | 2.4 GHz | 2/2/3/4/5/6/7/8/10/10 | 10 × 256 KB | 25 MB | 90 W | LGA 2011-3 | 2× 8.0 GT/s QPI | 4× DDR4-2133 | April 2016 | BX80660E52640V4; CM8066002032701 | $939 |
| Xeon E5-2689 v4 | SR2T7 (B0) | 10 | 3.1 GHz | 6/6/6/6/6/6/6/6/7/7 | 10 × 256 KB | 25 MB | 165 W | LGA 2011-3 | 2× 9.6 GT/s QPI | 4× DDR4-2400 | April 2016 | CM8066002648200 | $2723 |
Twelve Core
| Xeon E5-2628L v4 | SR2NC (M0) | 12 | 1.9 GHz | 2/2/2/2/2/2/2/2/2/3/ 5/5 | 12 × 256 KB | 30 MB | 75 W | LGA 2011-3 | 2× 8.0 GT/s QPI | 4× DDR4-2133 | April 2016 | CM8066002044903 | $1364 |
| Xeon E5-2650 v4 | SR2N3 (M0) | 12 | 2.2 GHz | 3/3/3/3/3/3/3/3/4/5/ 7/7 | 12 × 256 KB | 30 MB | 105 W | LGA 2011-3 | 2× 9.6 GT/s QPI | 4× DDR4-2400 | April 2016 | BX80660E52650V4; CM8066002031103 | $1166 |
| Xeon E5-2666 v4 | SR2N9 (M0) | 12 | 2.8 GHz | 3/3/3/3/3/3/3/3/3/4/ 6/6 | 12 × 256 KB | 30 MB | 145 W | LGA 2011-3 | 2× 9.6 GT/s QPI | 4× DDR4-2400 | 2016 | CM8066002034302 | OEM for Amazon |
| Xeon E5-2687W v4 | SR2NA (M0) | 12 | 3 GHz | 2/2/2/2/2/2/2/2/2/3/ 5/5 | 12 × 256 KB | 30 MB | 160 W | LGA 2011-3 | 2× 9.6 GT/s QPI | 4× DDR4-2400 | April 2016 | BX80660E52687V4; CM8066002042802 | $2141 |
Fourteen Core
| Xeon E5-2648L v4 | SR2ND (M0) | 14 | 1.8 GHz | 3/3/3/3/3/3/3/3/3/3/ 4/5/7/7 | 14 × 256 KB | 35 MB | 75 W | LGA 2011-3 | 2× 9.6 GT/s QPI | 4× DDR4-2400 | April 2016 | CM8066002189001 | $1544 |
| Xeon E5-2650L v4 | SR2N8 (M0) | 14 | 1.7 GHz | 3/3/3/3/3/3/3/3/3/4/ 5/6/8/8 | 14 × 256 KB | 35 MB | 65 W | LGA 2011-3 | 2× 9.6 GT/s QPI | 4× DDR4-2400 | April 2016 | CM8066002033006 | $1329 |
| Xeon E5-2658 v4 | SR2NB (M0) | 14 | 2.3 GHz | 2/2/2/2/2/2/2/2/2/2/ 2/5/5/5 | 14 × 256 KB | 35 MB | 105 W | LGA 2011-3 | 2× 9.6 GT/s QPI | 4× DDR4-2400 | April 2016 | CM8066002044801 | $1832 |
| Xeon E5-2660 v4 | SR2N4 (M0) | 14 | 2 GHz | 4/4/4/4/4/4/5/6/7/8/ 9/10/12/12 | 14 × 256 KB | 35 MB | 105 W | LGA 2011-3 | 2× 9.6 GT/s QPI | 4× DDR4-2400 | April 2016 | BX80660E52660V4; CM8066002031201 | $1445 |
| Xeon E5-2680 v4 | SR2N7 (M0) | 14 | 2.4 GHz | 5/5/5/5/5/5/5/5/5/5/ 6/7/9/9 | 14 × 256 KB | 35 MB | 120 W | LGA 2011-3 | 2× 9.6 GT/s QPI | 4× DDR4-2400 | April 2016 | BX80660E52680V4; CM8066002031501 | $1745 |
| Xeon E5-2690 v4 | SR2N2 (M0) | 14 | 2.6 GHz | 6/6/6/6/6/6/6/6/6/6/ 6/7/9/9 | 14 × 256 KB | 35 MB | 135 W | LGA 2011-3 | 2× 9.6 GT/s QPI | 4× DDR4-2400 | April 2016 | BX80660E52690V4; CM8066002030908 | $2090 |
Sixteen Core
| Xeon AWS-1100 v4 | SR2HZ (B0) | 16 | 2.4 GHz | 3/?/?/?/?/?/?/?/?/?/ ?/?/?/?/?/6 | 16 × 256 KB | 40 MB | 145 W | LGA 2011-3 | 2× 9.6 GT/s QPI | 4× DDR4-2400 | 2016 | CM8066002034209 | OEM |
| Xeon E5-2676 v4 | SR2JY (B0) | 16 | 2.4 GHz | 3/3/3/3/3/3/3/3/3/3/ 3/3/3/4/6/6 | 16 × 256 KB | 40 MB | 145 W | LGA 2011-3 | 2× 9.6 GT/s QPI | 4× DDR4-2400 | 2016 | CM8066002396203 | OEM |
| Xeon E5-2682 v4 | SR2K4 (B0) | 16 | 2.5 GHz | 4/4/4/4/4/4/4/4/4/4/ 4/4/4/4/5/5 | 16 × 256 KB | 40 MB | 120 W | LGA 2011-3 | 2× 9.6 GT/s QPI | 4× DDR4-2400 | April 2016 | CM8066002647700 | OEM |
| Xeon E5-2683 v4 | SR2JT (B0) | 16 | 2.1 GHz | 5/5/5/5/5/5/5/5/5/5/ 5/5/6/7/9/9 | 16 × 256 KB | 40 MB | 120 W | LGA 2011-3 | 2× 9.6 GT/s QPI | 4× DDR4-2400 | April 2016 | CM8066002023604 | $1846 |
| Xeon E5-2697A v4 | SR2K1 (B0) | 16 | 2.6 GHz | 5/5/5/5/5/5/5/5/5/5/ 5/6/7/8/10/10 | 16 × 256 KB | 40 MB | 145 W | LGA 2011-3 | 2× 9.6 GT/s QPI | 4× DDR4-2400 | April 2016 | CM8066002645900 | $2891 |
Eighteen Core
| Xeon E5-2686 v4 | SR2K8 (B0) | 18 | 2.3 GHz | 4/4/4/4/4/4/4/4/4/4/ 4/4/4/4/4/5/7/7 | 18 × 256 KB | 45 MB | 145 W | LGA 2011-3 | 2× 9.6 GT/s QPI | 4× DDR3-1866 & DDR4-2400 | April 2016 | CM8066002685800 | OEM |
| Xeon E5-2695 v4 | SR2J1 (B0) | 18 | 2.1 GHz | 5/5/5/5/5/5/5/5/5/5/ 5/6/7/8/9/10/12/12 | 18 × 256 KB | 45 MB | 120 W | LGA 2011-3 | 2× 9.6 GT/s QPI | 4× DDR4-2400 | April 2016 | CM8066002023801 | $2424 |
| Xeon E5-2697 v4 | SR2JV (B0) | 18 | 2.3 GHz | 5/5/5/5/5/5/5/5/5/5/ 6/7/8/9/10/11/13/13 | 18 × 256 KB | 45 MB | 145 W | LGA 2011-3 | 2× 9.6 GT/s QPI | 4× DDR4-2400 | April 2016 | CM8066002023907 | $2702 |
Twenty Core
| Xeon E5-2673 v4 | SR2KE (B0) | 20 | 2.3 GHz | 3/3/3/3/3/3/3/3/3/3/ 4/5/6/7/8/9/10/11/13/13 | 20 × 256 KB | 50 MB | 135 W | LGA 2011-3 | 2× 9.6 GT/s QPI | 4× DDR4-2400 | 2016 | CM8066002733700 | OEM |
| Xeon E5-2679 v4 | SR2K5 (B0) | 20 | 2.5 GHz | 7/7/7/7/7/7/7/7/7/7/ 7/7/7/7/7/7/7/7/8/8 | 20 × 256 KB | 50 MB | 200 W | LGA 2011-3 | 2× 9.6 GT/s QPI | 4× DDR4-2400 | April 2016 | CM8066002647800 | OEM |
| Xeon E5-2698 v4 | SR2JW (B0) | 20 | 2.2 GHz | 5/5/5/5/5/5/5/5/5/5/ 5/6/7/8/9/10/11/12/14/14 | 20 × 256 KB | 50 MB | 135 W | LGA 2011-3 | 2× 9.6 GT/s QPI | 4× DDR4-2400 | April 2016 | CM8066002024000 | $3226 |
Twenty-Two Core
| Xeon E5-2696 v4 | SR2J0 (B0) | 22 | 2.2 GHz | 6/6/6/6/6/6/6/6/6/6/ 6/6/6/7/8/9/10/11/12/13/ 15/15 | 22 × 256 KB | 55 MB | 150 W | LGA 2011-3 | 2× 9.6 GT/s QPI | 4× DDR3-1866 & DDR4-2400 | April 2016 | CM8066002402501 | OEM |
| Xeon E5-2699 v4 | SR2JS (B0) | 22 | 2.2 GHz | 6/6/6/6/6/6/6/6/6/6/ 6/6/6/6/7/8/9/10/11/12/ 14/14 | 22 × 256 KB | 55 MB | 145 W | LGA 2011-3 | 2× 9.6 GT/s QPI | 4× DDR4-2400 | April 2016 | CM8066002022506 | $4115 |
| Xeon E5-2699A v4 | SR30Y (B0) | 22 | 2.4 GHz | 6/6/6/6/6/6/6/6/6/6/ 6/6/6/6/6/6/7/8/9/10/ 12/12 | 22 × 256 KB | 55 MB | 145 W | LGA 2011-3 | 2× 9.6 GT/s QPI | 4× DDR4-2400 | October 2016 | CM8066003197800 | $4938 |
| Xeon E5-2699C v4 | SR2TF (B0) | 22 | 2.2 GHz | 2/2/2/2/2/2/2/2/2/2/ 2/2/2/2/2/2/2/2/2/2/ 2/2 | 22 × 256 KB | 55 MB | 145 W | LGA 2011-3 | 2× 9.6 GT/s QPI | 4× DDR4-2400 | 2016 | | OEM |
| Xeon E5-2699R v4 | SR31X (B0) | 22 | 2.2 GHz | 6/6/6/6/6/6/6/6/6/6/ 6/6/6/6/7/8/9/10/11/12/ 14/14 | 22 × 256 KB | 55 MB | 145 W | LGA 2011-3 | 2× 9.6 GT/s QPI | 4× DDR4-2400 | October 2016 | CM8066003216500 (Embedded version on sale for 7 years, works on the same 2011-3 socket) | $4560 |
| Xeon E5-2699P v4 | | 22 | 3 GHz | 6/6/6/6/6/6/6/6/6/6/ 6/6/6/6/6/6/6/6/6/6/ /6/6 | 22 × 256 KB | 55 MB | 300 W | LGA 2011-3 | 2× 9.6 GT/s QPI | 4× DDR4-2400 | January 2017 | This CPU seems like an unreleased product. | OEM |

=== Xeon E5-46xx v4 (quad-processor) ===
| Model number | sSpec number | Cores | Frequency | Turbo | L2 cache | L3 cache | TDP | Socket | I/O bus | Memory | Release date | Part number(s) | Release price (USD) |
|---|---|---|---|---|---|---|---|---|---|---|---|---|---|
| Xeon E5-4610 v4 | SR2SE (M0) | 10 | 1.8 GHz | —N/a | 10 × 256 KB | 25 MB | 105 W | LGA 2011-3 | 2× 6.4 GT/s QPI | 4× DDR4 | June 2016 | CM8066002062800 | $1219 |
| Xeon E5-4620 v4 | SR2SJ (M0) | 10 | 2.1 GHz | 2.6 GHz | 10 × 256 KB | 25 MB | 105 W | LGA 2011-3 | 2× 8.0 GT/s QPI | 4× DDR4 | June 2016 | CM8066002883900 | $1668 |
| Xeon E5-4627 v4 | SR2SN (M0) | 10 | 2.6 GHz | 3.2 GHz | 10 × 256 KB | 25 MB | 135 W | LGA 2011-3 | 2× 8.0 GT/s QPI | 4× DDR4 | June 2016 | CM8066002330800 | $2225 |
| Xeon E5-4628L v4 | SR2SB (M0) | 14 | 1.8 GHz | 2.2 GHz | 14 × 256 KB | 35 MB | 75 W | LGA 2011-3 | 2× 8.0 GT/s QPI | 4× DDR4 | June 2016 | CM8066002061000 | $2535 |
| Xeon E5-4640 v4 | SR2SC (M0) | 12 | 2.1 GHz | 2.6 GHz | 12 × 256 KB | 30 MB | 105 W | LGA 2011-3 | 2× 8.0 GT/s QPI | 4× DDR4 | June 2016 | CM8066002061701 | $2837 |
| Xeon E5-4650 v4 | SR2SA (M0) | 14 | 2.2 GHz | 2.8 GHz | 14 × 256 KB | 35 MB | 105 W | LGA 2011-3 | 2× 9.6 GT/s QPI | 4× DDR4 | June 2016 | CM8066002028621 | $3838 |
| Xeon E5-4655 v4 | SR2SH (M0) | 8 | 2.5 GHz | 1/1/2/3/4/5/7/7 | 8 × 256 KB | 30 MB | 135 W | LGA 2011-3 | 2× 9.6 GT/s QPI | 4× DDR4 | June 2016 | CM8066002065000 | $4616 |
| Xeon E5-4660 v4 | SR2SD (B0) | 16 | 2.2 GHz | 3.0 GHz | 16 × 256 KB | 40 MB | 120 W | LGA 2011-3 | 2× 9.6 GT/s QPI | 4× DDR4 | June 2016 | CM8066002062605 | $4727 |
| Xeon E5-4667 v4 | SR2SF (B0) | 18 | 2.2 GHz | 3.0 GHz | 18 × 256 KB | 45 MB | 135 W | LGA 2011-3 | 2× 9.6 GT/s QPI | 4× DDR4 | June 2016 | CM8066002064600 | $5729 |
| Xeon E5-4669 v4 | SR2SG (B0) | 22 | 2.2 GHz | 3.0 GHz | 22 × 256 KB | 55 MB | 135 W | LGA 2011-3 | 2× 9.6 GT/s QPI | 4× DDR4 | June 2016 | CM8066002064800 | $7007 |

== "Broadwell-EX" (14 nm) ==
- All models support: MMX, SSE, SSE2, SSE3, SSSE3, SSE4.1, SSE4.2, AVX, AVX2, FMA3, F16C, Enhanced Intel SpeedStep Technology (EIST), Intel 64, XD bit (an NX bit implementation), Intel VT-x, Intel VT-d, Hyper-threading, Turbo Boost 2.0, AES-NI, Smart Cache.
- Support for up to 12 DIMMs of DDR4 memory per CPU socket.

=== Xeon E7-48xx v4 (quad-processor) ===
| Model number | sSpec number | Cores | Frequency | Turbo | L2 cache | L3 cache | TDP | Socket | I/O bus | Memory | Release date | Part number(s) | Release price (USD) |
|---|---|---|---|---|---|---|---|---|---|---|---|---|---|
| Xeon E7-4809 v4 | SR2S5 (B0) | 8 | 2.1 GHz | —N/a | 8 × 256 KB | 20 MB | 115 W | LGA 2011-1 | 3× 6.4 GT/s QPI | 4× DDR4-1866; 4× DDR3-1333 | June 6, 2016 | CM8066902027604 | $1223 |
| Xeon E7-4820 v4 | SR2S4 (B0) | 10 | 2 GHz | —N/a | 10 × 256 KB | 25 MB | 115 W | LGA 2011-1 | 3× 6.4 GT/s QPI | 4× DDR4-1866; 4× DDR3-1333 | June 6, 2016 | CM8066902027500 | $1502 |
| Xeon E7-4830 v4 | SR2S3 (B0) | 14 | 2 GHz | 2/2/2/2/2/2/2/2/3/4/ 5/6/8/8 | 14 × 256 KB | 35 MB | 115 W | LGA 2011-1 | 3× 8.0 GT/s QPI | 4× DDR4-1866; 4× DDR3-1600 | June 6, 2016 | CM8066902027102 | $2170 |
| Xeon E7-4850 v4 | SR2S2 (B0) | 16 | 2.1 GHz | 3/3/3/3/3/3/3/3/3/3/ 3/3/4/5/7/7 | 16 × 256 KB | 40 MB | 115 W | LGA 2011-1 | 3× 8.0 GT/s QPI | 4× DDR4-1866; 4× DDR3-1600 | June 6, 2016 | CM8066902026904 | $3003 |

=== Xeon E7-88xx v4 (octa-processor) ===
| Model number | sSpec number | Cores | Frequency | Turbo | L2 cache | L3 cache | TDP | Socket | I/O bus | Memory | Release date | Part number(s) | Release price (USD) |
|---|---|---|---|---|---|---|---|---|---|---|---|---|---|
| Xeon E7-8855 v4 | SR2S9 (B0) | 14 | 2.1 GHz | 3/3/3/3/3/3/3/3/3/3/ 4/5/7/7 | 14 × 256 KB | 35 MB | 140 W | LGA 2011-1 | 3× 8.0 GT/s QPI | 4× DDR4-1866; 4× DDR3-1600 | June 6, 2016 | CM8066902675600 | $3003 |
| Xeon E7-8860 v4 | SR2S8 (B0) | 18 | 2.2 GHz | 5/5/5/5/5/5/5/5/5/5/ 5/5/5/6/7/8/10/10 | 18 × 256 KB | 45 MB | 140 W | LGA 2011-1 | 3× 9.6 GT/s QPI | 4× DDR4-1866; 4× DDR3-1600 | June 6, 2016 | CM8066902325800 | $4061 |
| Xeon E7-8867 v4 | SR2S6 (B0) | 18 | 2.4 GHz | 4/4/4/4/4/4/4/4/4/4/ 4/4/4/5/6/7/9/9 | 18 × 256 KB | 45 MB | 165 W | LGA 2011-1 | 3× 9.6 GT/s QPI | 4× DDR4-1866; 4× DDR3-1600 | June 6, 2016 | CM8066902028403 | $4672 |
| Xeon E7-8870 v4 | SR2S1 (B0) | 20 | 2.1 GHz | 5/5/5/5/5/5/5/5/5/5/ 5/5/5/5/5/6/7/8/9/9 | 20 × 256 KB | 50 MB | 140 W | LGA 2011-1 | 3× 9.6 GT/s QPI | 4× DDR4-1866; 4× DDR3-1600 | June 6, 2016 | CM8066902025802 | $4672 |
| Xeon E7-8880 v4 | SR2S7 (B0) | 22 | 2.2 GHz | 4/4/4/4/4/4/4/4/4/4/ 4/4/4/4/4/5/6/7/8/9/ 11/11 | 22 × 256 KB | 55 MB | 150 W | LGA 2011-1 | 3× 9.6 GT/s QPI | 4× DDR4-1866; 4× DDR3-1600 | June 6, 2016 | CM8066902325500 | $5895 |
| Xeon E7-8890 v4 | SR2SS (B0) | 24 | 2.2 GHz | 4/4/4/4/4/4/4/4/4/4/ 4/4/4/4/4/4/5/6/7/8/ 9/10/12/12 | 24 × 256 KB | 60 MB | 165 W | LGA 2011-1 | 3× 9.6 GT/s QPI | 4× DDR4-1866; 4× DDR3-1600 | June 6, 2016 | CM8066902885200 | $7174 |
| Xeon E7-8891 v4 | SR2SQ (B0) | 10 | 2.8 GHz | 5/5/5/5/5/5/5/5/7/7 | 10 × 256 KB | 60 MB | 165 W | LGA 2011-1 | 3× 9.6 GT/s QPI | 4× DDR4-1866; 4× DDR3-1600 | June 6, 2016 | CM8066902027903 | $6841 |
| Xeon E7-8893 v4 | SR2SR (B0) | 4 | 3.2 GHz | 2/2/3/3 | 4 × 256 KB | 60 MB | 140 W | LGA 2011-1 | 3× 9.6 GT/s QPI | 4× DDR4-1866; 4× DDR3-1600 | June 6, 2016 | CM8066902065502 | $6841 |
| Xeon E7-8894 v4 | SR32U (B0) | 24 | 2.4 GHz | 5/5/5/5/5/5/5/5/5/5/ 5/5/5/5/5/5/5/5/5/6/ 7/8/10/10 | 24 × 256 KB | 60 MB | 165 W | LGA 2011-1 | 3× 9.6 GT/s QPI | 4× DDR4-1866; 4× DDR3-1600 | February 9, 2017 | CM8066903251800 | $8898 |
