= Bradwell, Devon =

Hamlet in Devon, England

Coordinates: 51.15°N 04.16°W

Bradwell
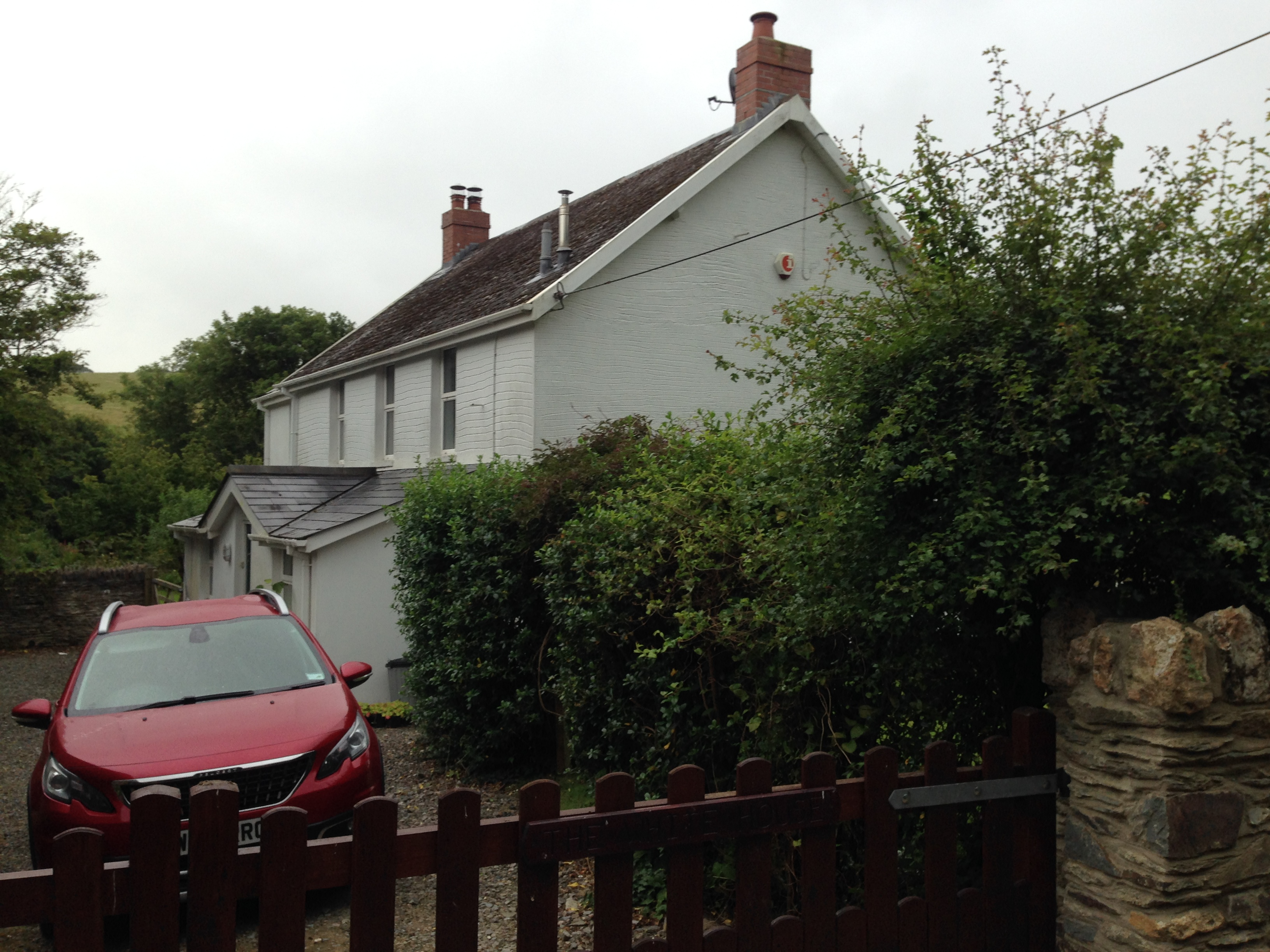
- Buildings in Bradwell

- Location within Devon
- OS grid reference: SS4942
- Civil parish: West Down
- District: North Devon
- Shire county: Devon
- Region: South West
- Country: England
- Sovereign state: United Kingdom
- Police: Devon and Cornwall
- Fire: Devon and Somerset
- Ambulance: South Western

Bradwell is a hamlet in Devon, England.
