= The Cavanaughs (web series) =

2010 soap opera web series

The Cavanaughs is a 2010 soap opera web series following a group of friends who reunite after working on a failed television pilot, and then come together to create a television sitcom entitled The Cavanaughs. Along the way, they find themselves creating a family of their own.

== Production history ==
The Cavanaughs was developed from a stage play-within-a-play comedy entitled The Seven Lessons of Life, which ran in Hollywood during the summers of 2002 and 2003, featuring the character of sitcom actor and drag queen Noreen Cavanaugh. This was followed with a workshop sequel play A Night with the Cavanaughs in 2004, which included musical numbers. Toward the end of the 2007–2008 Writers Guild of America strike, OAPCA Productions opted to bring these stage characters into a television form with the dramedy pilot The Cavanaughs. The first story saw a group of offbeat actors looking for money to run a theater in Hollywood while dealing with their own neuroses. The pilot generated interest and filming went smoothly. Soap Actor Thom Bierdz generously donated his personal artwork for several scenes. However, the project stalled for a year in post-production.

In the fall of 2009, creator Adrian Morales decided to generate an audience via the internet. Twelve initial episodes were written. In a twist from the stage plays and the unsold pilot, the web series would follow newly created fictionalized actors reassembling for a new television sitcom The Cavanaughs, retaining the show within a show concept. Production commenced on February 20, 2010, after assembling the majority of the main cast from the 2008 production. Shooting only on weekends, The Cavanaughs completed the first six episodes on April 11, 2010. The next six were completed on September 5, 2010.

Presented in episodes eight to ten minutes in length, season one of The Cavanaughs premiered on YouTube on May 20, 2010. Season two premiered on YouTube on March 17, 2011.

=== Filming ===
The Cavanaughs is filmed on Panasonic HVX200 cameras. Private residences in Santa Monica, California, and Silverlake, California, have served as the characters residences for Bryan, Maddie and Noreen. All nightclub and bar scenes were filmed at Alibi East in Pomona, California. For episodes 7 and 12, the office scenes were filmed in the historic Bradbury Building in Los Angeles, California.

=== Opening sequence ===
The opening sequence is a compilation of scenes from the series mixed with still photos, including various daytime shots of Santa Monica beach and day and evening shots of downtown Los Angeles buildings. The photo of Deborah Estelle Phillips in the mocking stance of a mannequin was taken on set of the original sitcom pilot. Photos of Amanda Broadwell being playfully tackled by a dog are featured in episodes one to seven and are replaced by other film clips of the Cavanaugh series.

=== Music ===
The piano instrumental opening theme is from the song "When Will Love Find Me" by Adrian Morales and Michael Upward. The song was originally performed in the stage play Only A Phone Call Away. The theme is featured throughout the series applying to the storylines. An abridged version is sung in Episode 3 by Daniel Rhyder (Scott).

LA-based band The Wildcat and Joshua Gollish gave permission for the use of their music to be featured, blending in with the storylines. "The Gray Road Home" is heard over the montages in episodes two and seven. Also used are the songs "Take Me Away" (episodes five and eight) and "Something in Her Eyes" (episode eight).

== Characters ==
- Noreen Cavanaugh (Ginger Snappz) – a colorful drag queen with a heart of gold who has had her own wildly successful television sitcom. She takes pride The Cavanaughs was written especially for her and becomes a den mother to the cast and crew.
- Bryan (Adrian Morales) – the writer. After two years, he returns to the project finding a new direction with his characters and must decide if he can move on with his life after the death of his lover, Shea.
- Maddie (Cwennen Corral) – Bryan's co-producing partner and sister of Shea. Head strong and confident, she has pushed love out of her life to watch over her friends in need. She is best friends with Charley.
- Charley (Deborah Estelle Phillips) – a chain-smoking actress about to be married to a man she is not in love with. She harbors a secret she feels will tear her family apart and goes to extreme lengths to conceal it.
- Mark (Grant Landry) – an outgoing, successfully working actor. He is very confident in his actions, though some see him as too cocky. While he has a love-hate relationship with his co-star Sarah, Mark has a stalker who follows his every move.
- Sarah (Amanda Broadwell) – a quirky actress who does her work via internet and commercials. Though she is attracted to Mark, she is envious of his success. Hit with cupid's arrow, Sarah must decide on how to act.
- Scott (Daniel Rhyder) – Sarah's best friend. A genuinely good person, he does what he can to watch over Sarah while trying to embark on his own singing career.

With

- Justin (Kevin Makely) – Maddie's ex-boyfriend and Charley's ex-roommate. After a twist of fate, he wishes Maddie was back in his life.
- Hope (Kimberly Fox) – a producer who promises to make The Cavanaughs happen with her own agenda.
- Dumas (Percy Rustomji) – Mark's stalker. He shares a past connection with his obsession.
- Chris (Patrick O'Sullivan - Season 1) – Charley's groom-to-be.
- Shea (Mikey Lamar- Season 1; Ryan Kibby - Season 2) – Byran's deceased lover and Maddie's brother.
- Zack (Matthew Trbovich- Season 2) – Sarah's beau who is an airhead model living in his own little bubble.

Notable guests

- Dina Martinez and Gregg Potter – LA-based talk show hosts from The Dina & Gregg Show.
- Beverly Fairfax – LA-based drag queen personality

Trivia

- Grant Landry and Daniel Rhyder appear together in the dramatic indie feature Better Half.

== Episodes ==
=== Season 1 ===
Episode	Episode Title	Directed by	Written by	Release date	Summary
1.01	Think of Me	Byron Macdonald	Adrian Morales	May 20, 2010	Pilot
1.02	Woman in White	Byron Macdonald	Adrian Morales	May 27, 2010	The identity of the guy in the picture is revealed. The idea of returning to 'The Cavanaughs' is tossed around. On the eve of her wedding, Charley has a heart to heart with Maddie.
1.03	If Only	Byron Macdonald	Adrian Morales	June 3, 2010	Charley's wedding day arrives. Sarah finds herself thinking of Mark. Scott performs Bryan's song.
1.04	Half A Moment	Byron Macdonald	Adrian Morales	June 17, 2010	Writer's block causes Bryan to hallucinate. Maddie gets a visit from a former flame. Mark has a stalker. Charlie returns with a decision regarding 'The Cavanaughs'.
1.05	Stop! Wait! Please!	Byron Macdonald	Adrian Morales	June 24, 2010	Maddie gives Bryan a writing deadline for a new "Cavanaughs" script. Noreen tries to stop Sarah from doing something drastic with Mark. Mark has his hands full dealing with his stepbrother.
1.06	Don't Know How to Love Him	Byron Macdonald	Adrian Morales	July 7, 2010	A new script for The Cavanaughs is completed and a dinner party is called. Dumas makes an attempt at friendship with Mark. Sarah's act of love encourages Maddie and Scott to act impulsively.
1.07	Memory	Nicole Olmsted	Adrian Morales	July 29, 2010	Noreen is on a mission to find out why two actors have quit The Cavanaughs. Charley and Bryan lean on each other. Dumas remains persistent in his brotherly relationship with Mark.
1.08	Dice Are Rolling	Nicole Olmsted	Adrian Morales	August 5, 2010	Noreen and Maddie debate the religion issue. Scott reaches out to Bryan. Charley runs into Chris, the man she left at the altar. Dumas realizes Sarah has feelings for Mark.
1.09	Seeing is Believing	Nicole Olmsted	Adrian Morales	August 19, 2010	Noreen shares a secret with Mark. Bryan compromises on not doing the script with the religious jokes to get Maddie back on board. Maddie shares how things are going with Justin. Charley finds a friendly ear with Beverly Fairfax.
1.10	Likes of Us	Byron Macdonald	Adrian Morales	September 23, 2010	Noreen and Beverly Fairfax share some TV History. Scott sees a different side of Mark. Sarah is panned on YouTube. The new producer offers Justin a job, and her identity makes Maddie assume the worst.
1.11	Let Me Finish	Byron Macdonald	Adrian Morales	September 30, 2010	Dumas targets Scott. Mark gives Sarah a boost of confidence. Noreen defends Charley. Justin questions Hope's motives. Maddie and Hope meet for the first time.
1.12	Point of No Return	Byron Macdonald	Adrian Morales	October 7, 2010	The Cavanaughs have their first table read. Charley gets a call from her parents. Scott finds himself thinking of Mark. Hope reveals her true self to Bryan.

=== Season 2 ===
Episode	Episode Title	Directed by	Written by	Release date	Summary
2.01	The Wine and The Dice	Byron Macdonald	Adrian Morales	March 17, 2011	Hope wants Maddie off 'The Cavanaughs'. Scott does not approve of Sarah's new suitor and goes to Mark for help. Charley reveals a sad secret to Justin.
2.02	If Not For Me	Byron Macdonald	Adrian Morales	March 24, 2011	In defense of Maddie's firing, the cast attempt a walk out. Maddie and Charley have a falling-out. Justin confronts Hope. Shea returns.
2.03	Beautiful Game	Byron Macdonald	Adrian Morales	March 31, 2011	Shea continues to haunt Noreen. Justin brings Maddie and Charley back together. Bryan and Shea share a moment. Sarah is entertained by her new beau which makes Scott feel left out. Mark and Scott place a wager over a game of pool.
2.04	So Much To Do	Byron Macdonald	Adrian Morales	April 7, 2011	Hope interrogates Bryan about his drinking. Charley checks up on Maddie. Beverly urges Noreen get Maddie back on 'The Cavanaughs' before it is too late. Justin has a hunch and uses Dumas help him. Sarah brings Zack to meet Mark, much to Scott's chagrin. Hope finds a casting replacement in talk show hostess Dina Martinez.
1.05	Poor Fool	Byron Macdonald	Adrian Morales	April 14, 2011	Justin confronts Hope. Sarah and Scott's friendship is on shaky ground. Noreen and Maddie learn Dina Martinez has joined the cast. Dumas gets a jolt.
1.06	Dear Old Friend	Byron Macdonald	Adrian Morales	April 21, 2011	The spring finale of the series features a major cast announcement, a reconciliation between friends, and a "morning after" surprise.

== Press ==
On May 4, 2010, The Dina and Gregg Show released episode five, previewing the upcoming The Cavanaughs and an interview with Grant Landry. The Dina and Gregg Show continual positive attitude toward the series prompted an invite for the hosts to appear as themselves on Episodes 7, 9 and 12.

On May 14, 2010, Soap News Website Daytime Confidential posted an article by Jamey Giddens, previewing The Cavanaughs as "Think Sordid Lives meets 30 Rock. The Cavanaughs looks like a lot of fun!". Jamey Giddens has continually blogged and posted about each episode.

Another Soap News Website WeLoveSoaps has also posted each new episode on its website and features The Cavanaughs among other websoaps on its Indi Soap Beat News. The Cavanaughs has consistently ranked in the top 3 throughout every episode released on the WeLoveSoaps - Indi Soap of the Week Poll, indicating the websoap has developed a small loyal audience.

The Cavanaughs has also been regularly featured on the TimeAfterTime/Soap World website, which promotes daytime and nighttime soaps both currently on air and cancelled. On July 2, TATSW praised The Cavanaughs with "Taking the idea of diversity and creativity to the next step". The Cavanaughs was voted number 2 best indie soap for the month of June.

On July 7, 2010, WeLoveSoapsTV released Episode 48, where WLS Editor Roger Newcomb interviewed Grant Landry (Mark) in Times Square, New York. The interview detailed Landry's history in acting and his experiences/storylines so far in The Cavanaughs.

Issue 51 of SGL Weekly Magazine profiled Daniel Rhyder (Scott) in which briefly discussed his positive experiences and involvement with The Cavanaughs.

In reviewing the first six episodes, popular blogspot Deep Dish: Web Series of the Week, which spotlights 'groovy gay pop culture', Marc Harshbarger complimented The Cavanaughs, " With high production values, a talented cast and some interesting storylines, The Cavanaughs is definitely worth checking out." Deep Dish has consistently recommended The Cavanaughs as one of the Webseries Picks of the week.

Online magazine Dign2it wrote an article covering the emergence of web soaps amidst the decline of daytime programming, and appealing aspect of the stories indie soaps are able to tell not normally seen on broadcast television or by the traditional conservative soap followings. They applauded The Cavanaughs for their prominent LGBT storylines.

== Awards and nominations ==
The 2nd Annual Indie Soap Awards recognized The Cavanaughs with two nominations - Outstanding Leading Actress for Cwennen Corral (Maddie) and the Fan Choice Award for the soap itself. The Deep Dish also gave two nods to Grant Landry (Mark) for runner-up Hottest Hunk - Web Series of 2010 and an Honorable Mention was given to Ginger Snappz (Noreen) for Most Entertaining Character - Web Series of 2010.
