= James Eugene Broadwell =

American aeronautical engineer

James Eugene "Gene" Broadwell (January 15, 1921, Atlanta, Georgia – June 22, 2018, Palo Alto, California) was an American aeronautical engineer, known for the Broadwell model (1964, Physics of Fluids). The model consists of a set of differential equations, describing the structure of a shock wave in a simple discrete velocity gas.

== Biography ==
Broadwell graduated in 1942 from Georgia Institute of Technology (Georgia Tech) with a B.S. in mechanical engineering. He served from 1942 to 1946 in the United States Army Air Force. During his military service, he was stationed at Wright Field in Dayton, Ohio, except when he was sent for additional training to California Institute of Technology (Caltech), where he received in 1944 an M.S. in aeronautical engineering. During his service at Wright Field, he worked on the design and development of aircraft engines. In October 1943 in Dayton, he married Edith "Edie" Merriman (1923–2018). Their marriage took place a few days before he was posted to Caltech. In 1948, the couple with their first daughter moved to Ann Arbor, Michigan, where he enrolled as a graduate student at the University of Michigan. There in 1952 he received a Ph.D. in aeronautical engineering. From 1948 to 1959 he was at the University of Michigan, where he was eventually promoted to associate professor. During Gene and Edie Broadwell's years in Ann Arbor, she gave birth to two more daughters, had her own television show, acted in university plays, and was a troop leader for the Brownies and the Girl Scouts of the USA. The family left Michigan and moved to Palos Verdes in Los Angeles County, California. There Gene Broadwell worked for TRW for many years. He also worked with colleagues at Caltech and sometimes did research at Caltech and Stanford University.

In 1987 he was elected to the National Academy of Engineering for "contributions to the understanding and management of turbulent mixing with application to chemical laser design." In 2014 he was elected to the Georgia Tech Engineering Hall of Fame.

Gene and Edie Broadwell were married for 75 years. She died about a month before he died. Upon his death he was survived by three daughters, a grandson, and two great-granddaughters.

== Selected publications ==
- Broadwell, J. E. (January 1950). "Supersonic Airfoils Simplified" (PDF). Journal of the Aeronautical Sciences. 17 (1): 61–62.
- Broadwell, James E. (1950). "Note on Rotational Gas Flow". Journal of the Aeronautical Sciences. 17 (2): 123–124. doi:10.2514/8.1540. ISSN 1936-9956.
- Broadwell, James E. (1958). "A simple model of the non-equilibrium dissociation of a gas in Couette and boundary-layer flows". Journal of Fluid Mechanics. 4 (2): 113. Bibcode:1958JFM.....4..113B. doi:10.1017/S0022112058000355. S2CID 122937498.
- Broadwell, James E. (1963). "Analysis of the Fluid Mechanics of Secondary Injection for Thrust Vector Control". AIAA Journal. 1 (5): 1067–1075. Bibcode:1963AIAAJ...1.1067B. doi:10.2514/3.1726.
- Broadwell, James E. (1964). "Shock Structure in a Simple Discrete Velocity Gas". Physics of Fluids. 7 (8): 1243. Bibcode:1964PhFl....7.1243B. doi:10.1063/1.1711368. (over 430 citations)
- Broadwell, James E. (1964). "Study of rarefied shear flow by the discrete velocity method". Journal of Fluid Mechanics. 19 (3): 401–414. Bibcode:1964JFM....19..401B. doi:10.1017/S0022112064000817. S2CID 124015960.
- Broadwell, J. E.; Tsu, C. N. (1967). "Transient pressures caused by rocket start and shutdown in ducted launchers". Journal of Spacecraft and Rockets. 4 (10): 1323–1328. Bibcode:1967JSpRo...4.1323B. doi:10.2514/3.29079.
- Vogenitz, F. W.; Bird, G. A.; Broadwell, J. E.; Rungaldier, H. (1968). "Theoretical and experimental study of rarefied supersonic flows about several simple shapes". AIAA Journal. 6 (12): 2388–2394. Bibcode:1968AIAAJ...6.2388B. doi:10.2514/3.4999.
- Vogenitz, F. W.; Broadwell, J. E.; Bird, G. A. (1970). "Leading edge flow by the Monte Carlo direct simulation technique". AIAA Journal. 8 (3): 504–510. Bibcode:1970AIAAJ...8..504B. doi:10.2514/3.5697.
- Dimotakis, Paul E.; Broadwell, James E. (1973). "Local temperature measurements in supercritical counterflow in liquid helium II". Physics of Fluids. 16 (11): 1787. Bibcode:1973PhFl...16.1787D. doi:10.1063/1.1694214.
- Broadwell, J. E. (1974). "Effect of Mixing Rate on HF Chemical Laser Performance". Applied Optics. 13 (4): 962–967. Bibcode:1974ApOpt..13..962B. doi:10.1364/AO.13.000962. PMID 20126107.
- Broadwell, J. E.; Breidenthal, R. E. (1982). "A simple model of mixing and chemical reaction in a turbulent shear layer". Journal of Fluid Mechanics. 125: 397. Bibcode:1982JFM...125..397B. doi:10.1017/S0022112082003401. S2CID 16394757.
- Broadwell, J. E.; Breidenthal, R. E. (1984). "Structure and mixing of a transverse jet in incompressible flow". Journal of Fluid Mechanics. 148: 405–412. Bibcode:1984JFM...148..405B. doi:10.1017/S0022112084002408. S2CID 17315683.
- Broadwell, James E.; Dahm, Werner J.A.; Mungal, M. Godfrey (1985). "Blowout of turbulent diffusion flames". Symposium (International) on Combustion. 20: 303–310. doi:10.1016/S0082-0784(85)80515-4.
- Koochesfahani, M. M.; Dimotakis, P. E.; Broadwell, J. E. (1985). "A 'flip' experiment in a chemically reacting turbulent mixing layer". AIAA Journal. 23 (8): 1191–1194. Bibcode:1985AIAAJ..23.1191K. doi:10.2514/3.9063.
- Broadwell, James E.; Dimotakis, Paul E. (1986). "Implications of recent experimental results for modeling reactions in turbulent flows". AIAA Journal. 24 (6): 885–889. Bibcode:1986AIAAJ..24..885B. doi:10.2514/3.9363.
- Broadwell, James E.; Mungal, M. Godfrey (1989). "Molecular mixing and chemical reactions in turbulent shear layers". Symposium (International) on Combustion. 22: 579–587. Bibcode:1989syic.proc..579B. doi:10.1016/S0082-0784(89)80065-7.
- Goldstein, D.; Sturtevant, B.; Broadwell, J. E. (1989). "Investigations of the motion of discrete-velocity gases". Progress in Astronautics and Aeronautics. 117: 100. Bibcode:1989PrAA..117..100G.
