= Broadwell (microarchitecture) =

Fifth generation of Intel Core processors

General information
- Launched: October 27, 2014; 12 years ago
- Discontinued: November 2018
- Marketed by: Intel
- Designed by: Intel
- Common manufacturer: Intel
- CPUID code: 0306D4h
- Product code: 80658 (mainstream desktop/mobile, Xeon E3); 80660 (Xeon E5); 80669 (Xeon E7); 80671 (enthusiast desktop); 80674 (Xeon D); 80682 (Xeon D, Hewitt Lake)

Performance
- QPI speeds: 6.4 GT/s to 9.6 GT/s
- DMI speeds: 4 GT/s

Physical specifications
- Cores: 2–4 (mainstream); 6–10 (enthusiast); 4–24 (Xeon)
- GPUs: HD 5300; HD 5500; HD 5700P; HD 6000; HD 6100; HD 6200; HD 6300P; HD Graphics
- Sockets: LGA 1150; BGA 1364; LGA 2011-v3

Cache
- L1 cache: 64 KB per core
- L2 cache: 256 KB per core
- L3 cache: 2-6 MB (shared)
- L4 cache: 128 MB of eDRAM (Iris Pro models only)

Architecture and classification
- Technology node: 14 nm (Tri-Gate)
- Microarchitecture: Haswell
- Instruction set: x86-16, IA-32, x86-64
- Extensions: MMX, SSE, SSE2, SSE3, SSSE3, SSE4.1, SSE4.2, AVX, AVX2, TSX, FMA3; AES-NI, CLMUL, RDRAND, TXT; VT-x, VT-d

Products, models, variants
- Product code name: Rockwell
- Brand name: Core i3; Core i5; Core i7; Core M; Celeron; Pentium; Xeon

History
- Predecessors: Haswell (tock/architecture); Haswell Refresh (optimization)
- Successor: Skylake (tock/architecture)

Support status
- Unsupported

Haswell and Broadwell feature a Fully Integrated Voltage Regulator.

Broadwell (previously Rockwell) is an CPU microarchitecture designed by Intel, based on the x86-64 instruction set. As a "tick" generation of the company's tick–tock model, Broadwell is a die shrink of its predecessor, Haswell, manufactured with the newer 14 nm FinFET process node. Broadwell-based products are marketed as the fifth generation Core, v4-suffixed Xeon, and various models of Pentium and Celeron. Like some of the previous tick-tock iterations, Broadwell did not completely replace the full range of Haswell CPUs, as there were no low-end desktop CPUs based on Broadwell. The microarchitecture also introduced the Core M processor branding for the first time.

Broadwell's H and C variants are used in conjunction with Intel 9 Series chipsets (Z97, H97 and HM97), in addition to retaining backward compatibility with some of the Intel 8 Series chipsets.

== Design and variants ==
Broadwell has been launched in three major variants:

- BGA package:
  - Broadwell-Y: system on a chip (SoC); 4.5 W and 3.5 W thermal design power (TDP) classes, for tablets and certain ultrabook-class implementations. GT2 GPU was used, while maximum supported memory is 8 GB of LPDDR3-1600. These were the first chips to roll out, in Q3/Q4 2014. At Computex 2014, Intel announced that these chips would be branded as Core M. TSX instructions are disabled in this series of processors because a bug that cannot be fixed with a microcode update exists.
  - Broadwell-U: SoC; two TDP classes – 15 W for 2+2 and 2+3 configurations (two cores with a GT2 or GT3 GPU) as well as 28 W for 2+3 configurations. Designed to be used on motherboards with the PCH-LP chipset for Intel's ultrabook and NUC platforms. Maximum supported is up to 16 GB of DDR3 or LPDDR3 memory, with DDR3-1600 and LPDDR3-1867 as the maximum memory speeds. The 2+2 configuration is scheduled for Q4 2014, while the 2+3 is estimated for Q1 2015. For Broadwell-U models with integrated 5x00 GPUs, die size is 82 mm^{2} with a total of 1.3 billion transistors, while for the models with 6100 and 6200 GPUs the die size is 133 mm^{2} with a total of 1.9 billion transistors.
  - Broadwell-H: 37 W and 47 W TDP classes, for motherboards with HM86, HM87, QM87 and the new HM97 chipsets for "all-in-one" systems, mini-ITX form-factor motherboards, and other small footprint formats. It was expected to come in two different variants, as single and dual chips; the dual chips (4 cores, 8 threads) would have GT3e and GT2 GPU, while a single chip (SoC; two cores, four threads) would have GT3e GPU. Maximum supported memory is 32 GB of DDR3-1600. These are scheduled for Q2 2015.
- LGA 1150 socket:
  - Broadwell-DT: quad-core unlocked desktop version with GT3e integrated graphics (Iris Pro 6200) and 128 MB of eDRAM L4 cache, in a 65 W TDP class. Announced to be backward compatible with the LGA 1150 motherboards designed for Haswell processors.
- LGA 2011-1 socket:
  - Broadwell-EX: Brickland platform, for mission-critical servers. Intel QuickPath Interconnect (QPI) is expected to be updated to version 1.1, enabling seamless scaling beyond eight-socket systems. Maximum supported memory speeds are expected to be DDR3-1600 and DDR4-1866. Up to 24 core and 48 threads, up to 60 MB of L3 cache and 32 PCI Express 3.0 lanes, with 115–165 W TDP.
- LGA 2011-v3 socket:
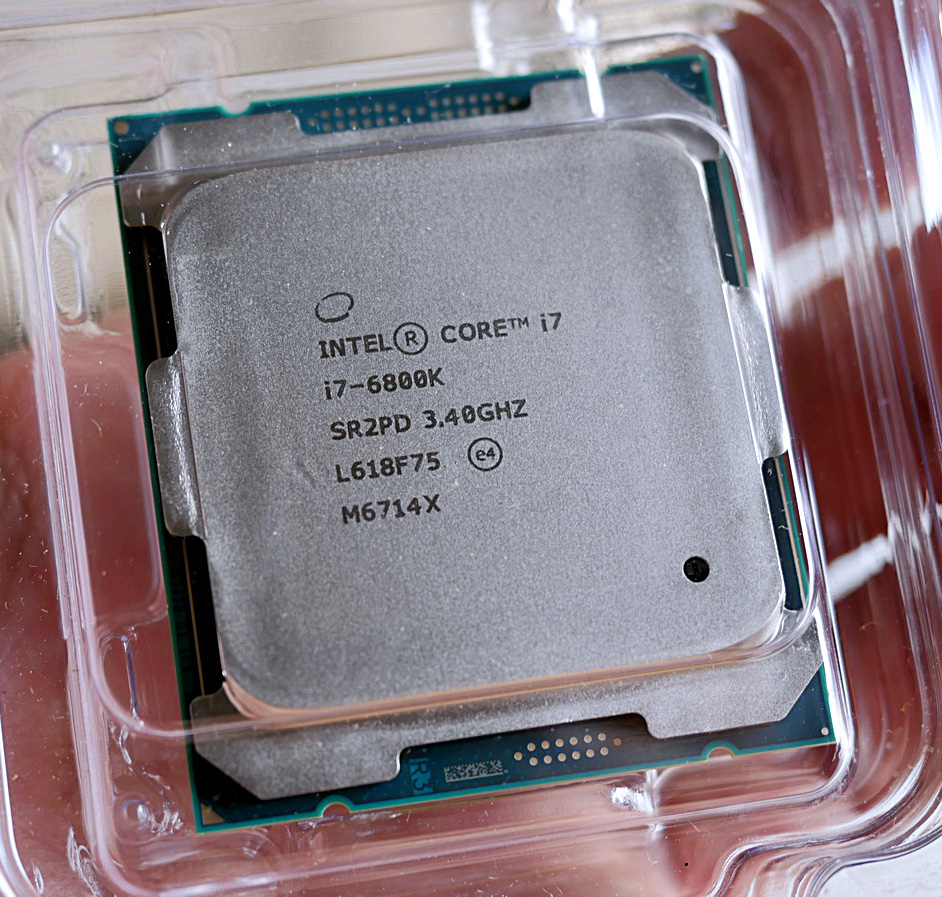
  Intel i7 6800K
  - Broadwell-EP: to be marketed as Xeon E5-2600 v4 etc., while using the C610 Wellsburg chipset platform. Up to 22 cores and 44 threads, up to 55 MB of total cache and 40 PCI Express 3.0 lanes, with 55–160 W TDP classes. Maximum supported memory speed is quad-channel DDR4-2400.
  - Broadwell-E: HEDT platform, for enthusiasts. Announced at Computex 2016, it was released in July that year. Consisting of four processors: the 6800K, 6850K, 6900K, and the deca-core 6950X, with clock speeds ranging from 3 GHz to 4 GHz as well as up to 25 MB of L3 cache.

== Architecture changes compared to Haswell ==
Unusually for a "tick", Broadwell introduces some instruction set architecture extensions not present in earlier versions of the Haswell microarchitecture:

=== CPU ===
- Instruction
  - Intel ADX: ADOX and ADCX for improving performance of arbitrary-precision integer operations
  - RDSEED for generating 16-, 32- or 64-bit random numbers from a thermal noise entropy stream, according to NIST SP 800-90B and 800-90C
  - PREFETCHW instruction
  - SMAP instruction
- Supervisor Mode Access Prevention (SMAP) – optionally disallows access from kernel-space memory to user-space memory, a feature aimed at making it harder to exploit software bugs.
- Transactional Synchronization Extensions (except for Broadwell-Y due hardware bug)
- FP multiplication instructions has improved latency
- Larger scheduler (up to 64 entries)
- Broadwell-E introduced Intel Turbo Boost Max Technology 3.0

=== GPU ===
- Gen 8 (From Gen 7.5)
- Up to 48 Execution Units (from 40)
- VP8 hardware decoding and hybrid encoding
- HEVC hybrid decoding
- Two independent bit stream decoder (BSD) rings to process video commands on GT3 GPUs, allows one BSD ring to process decoding and the other BSD ring to process encoding at the same time.
- Direct3D 12
- OpenGL 4.4 (OpenGL 4.6 on Linux)
- OpenCL 2.0.

=== I/O ===
- 90 series chipset: H97 and Z97
- Add PCIe M.2 support (only H97 and Z97)

All versions of Haswell except for the Haswell-EX variants has been fixed with a new CPU stepping level.Erratum: In fact, among Broadwell i3, i5 and i7 CPUs, only four of them support TSX instructions (i7 5650U and 5600U, i5 5350U and 5300U); it is not even precised on Intel's website whether i5 5200U does support TSX instructions.

== List of Broadwell processors ==
=== Desktop processors ===
| Processor branding | Model | Cores (threads) | GPU model | CPU frequency | | TDP | Graphics clock rate | | L3 cache | L4 cache (Note: Implemented as eDRAM and serving primarily to increase the performance of integrated GPU, while being shared with the CPU) | Release date | Price (USD) | Socket |
| Processor branding | Model | Cores (threads) | GPU model | Base | Turbo | TDP | Base | Max | L3 cache | L4 cache | Release date | Price (USD) | Socket |
|---|---|---|---|---|---|---|---|---|---|---|---|---|---|
| Core i7 | 5775C | 4 (8) | Iris Pro 6200 | 3.3 GHz | 3.7 GHz | 65 W | 300 MHz | 1.15 GHz | 6 MB | 128 MB | June 2, 2015 | $366 | LGA; 1150 |
| Core i5 | 5675C | 4 (4) | Iris Pro 6200 | 3.1 GHz | 3.6 GHz | 65 W | 300 MHz | 1.1 GHz | 4 MB | 128 MB | June 2, 2015 | $276 | LGA; 1150 |

==== "Broadwell-E" HEDT (14 nm) ====
| Model | sSpec number | Cores | Clock rate | Turbo | L2 cache | L3 cache | TDP | Socket | I/O bus | Memory | Release date | Part number(s) | Release price (USD) |
|---|---|---|---|---|---|---|---|---|---|---|---|---|---|
| Core i7-6950X | SR2PA | 10 | 3.0 GHz | 3.5 GHz | 10 × 256 KiB | 25 MB | 140 W | LGA 2011-3 | | 4 × DDR4-2400 | May 30, 2016 | BX80671I76950X; BXC80671I76950X | $1723 |
| Core i7-6900K | SR2PB | 8 | 3.2 GHz | 3.7 GHz | 8 × 256 KiB | 20 MB | 140 W | LGA 2011-3 | | 4 × DDR4-2400 | Q2 2016 | BX80671I76900K; BXC80671I76900K | $1089 |
| Core i7-6850K | SR2PC | 6 | 3.6 GHz | 3.8 GHz | 6 × 256 KiB | 15 MB | 140 W | LGA 2011-3 | | 4 × DDR4-2400 | Q2 2016 | BX80671I76850K; BXC80671I76850K | $617 |
| Core i7-6800K | SR2PD | 6 | 3.4 GHz | 3.6 GHz | 6 × 256 KiB | 15 MB | 140 W | LGA 2011-3 | | 4 × DDR4-2400 | Q2 2016 | BX80671I76800K; BXC80671I76800K | $434 |

=== Embedded processors ===
| Processor branding | Model | Cores (threads) | GPU model | CPU frequency | | TDP | Graphics clock rate | | L3 cache | L4 cache | Release date | Price (USD) | Socket |
| Processor branding | Model | Cores (threads) | GPU model | Base | Turbo | TDP | Base | Max | L3 cache | L4 cache | Release date | Price (USD) | Socket |
|---|---|---|---|---|---|---|---|---|---|---|---|---|---|
| Core i7 | 5775R | 4 (8) | Iris Pro 6200 | 3.3 GHz | 3.8 GHz | 65 W | 300 MHz | 1.15 GHz | 6 MB | 128 MB | June 2, 2015 | $348 | BGA; 1364 |
| Core i5 | 5675R | 4 (4) | Iris Pro 6200 | 3.1 GHz | 3.6 GHz | 65 W | 300 MHz | 1.1 GHz | 4 MB | 128 MB | June 2, 2015 | $265 | BGA; 1364 |
| Core i5 | 5575R | 4 (4) | Iris Pro 6200 | 2.8 GHz | 3.3 GHz | 65 W | 300 MHz | 1.05 GHz | 4 MB | 128 MB | June 2, 2015 | $244 | BGA; 1364 |
| Xeon E3 | 1284Lv4 | 4 (8) | Iris Pro P6300 | 2.9 GHz | 3.8 GHz | 47 W | 300 MHz | 1.15 GHz | 6 MB | 128 MB | June 2, 2015 | OEM | BGA; 1364 |
| Xeon E3 | 1278Lv4 | 4 (8) | Iris Pro P6300 | 2.0 GHz | 3.3 GHz | 47 W | 800 MHz | 1.0 GHz | 6 MB | 128 MB | June 2, 2015 | $546 | BGA; 1364 |
| Xeon E3 | 1258Lv4 | 4 (8) | P5700 | 1.8 GHz | 3.2 GHz | 47 W | 700 MHz | 1.0 GHz | 6 MB | —N/a | June 2, 2015 | $481 | BGA; 1364 |

=== Mobile processors ===
| Processor branding | Model | Cores (threads) | GPU model | Base frequency | Turbo frequency | | TDP | cTDP down | Graphics clock rate | | L3 cache | Release date | Price (USD) |
| Processor branding | Model | Cores (threads) | GPU model | Base frequency | Single Core | Dual Core | TDP | cTDP down | Base | Max | L3 cache | Release date | Price (USD) |
|---|---|---|---|---|---|---|---|---|---|---|---|---|---|
| Core i7 | 5950HQ | 4 (8) | Iris Pro 6200 | 2.9 GHz | 3.7 GHz | —N/a | 47 W | —N/a | 300 MHz | 1.15 GHz | 6 MB | June 2015 | $623 |
| Core i7 | 5850HQ | 4 (8) | Iris Pro 6200 | 2.7 GHz | 3.6 GHz | —N/a | 47 W | —N/a | 300 MHz | 1.1 GHz | 6 MB | June 2015 | $434 |
| Core i7 | 5750HQ | 4 (8) | Iris Pro 6200 | 2.5 GHz | 3.4 GHz | —N/a | 47 W | 600 MHz / 37 W | 300 MHz | 1.05 GHz | 6 MB | June 2015 | $434 |
| Core i7 | 5700HQ | 4 (8) | HD 5600 | 2.7 GHz | 3.5 GHz | —N/a | 47 W | 600 MHz / 37 W | 300 MHz | 1.05 GHz | 6 MB | June 2015 | $378 |
| Core i7 | 5650U | 2 (4) | HD 6000 | 2.2 GHz | 3.2 GHz | 3.1 GHz | 15 W | 600 MHz / 9.5 W | 300 MHz | 1 GHz | 4 MB | Q1 2015 | $426 |
| Core i7 | 5600U | 2 (4) | HD 5500 | 2.6 GHz | 3.2 GHz | 3.1 GHz | 15 W | 600 MHz / 7.5 W | 300 MHz | 950 MHz | 4 MB | Q1 2015 | $393 |
| Core i7 | 5557U | 2 (4) | Iris 6100 | 3.1 GHz | 3.4 GHz | 3.4 GHz | 28 W | N/A / 23 W | 300 MHz | 1.1 GHz | 4 MB | Q1 2015 | $426 |
| Core i7 | 5550U | 2 (4) | HD 6000 | 2.0 GHz | 3.0 GHz | 2.9 GHz | 15 W | 600 MHz / 9.5 W | 300 MHz | 1 GHz | 4 MB | Q1 2015 | $426 |
| Core i7 | 5500U | 2 (4) | HD 5500 | 2.4 GHz | 3.0 GHz | 2.9 GHz | 15 W | 600 MHz / 7.5 W | 300 MHz | 950 MHz | 4 MB | Q1 2015 | $393 |
| Core i5 | 5350H | 2 (4) | Iris Pro 6200 | 3.1 GHz | 3.5 GHz | —N/a | 47 W | —N/a | 300 MHz | 1.05 GHz | 4 MB | June 2015 | $289 |
| Core i5 | 5350U | 2 (4) | HD 6000 | 1.8 GHz | 2.9 GHz | 2.7 GHz | 15 W | 600 MHz / 9.5 W | 300 MHz | 1 GHz | 3 MB | Q1 2015 | $315 |
| Core i5 | 5300U | 2 (4) | HD 5500 | 2.3 GHz | 2.9 GHz | 2.7 GHz | 15 W | 600 MHz / 7.5 W | 300 MHz | 900 MHz | 3 MB | Q1 2015 | $281 |
| Core i5 | 5287U | 2 (4) | Iris 6100 | 2.9 GHz | 3.3 GHz | 3.3 GHz | 28 W | 600 MHz / 23 W | 300 MHz | 1.1 GHz | 3 MB | Q1 2015 | $315 |
| Core i5 | 5257U | 2 (4) | Iris 6100 | 2.7 GHz | 3.1 GHz | 3.1 GHz | 28 W | 600 MHz / 23 W | 300 MHz | 1.05 GHz | 3 MB | Q1 2015 | $315 |
| Core i5 | 5250U | 2 (4) | HD 6000 | 1.6 GHz | 2.7 GHz | 2.5 GHz | 15 W | 600 MHz / 9.5 W | 300 MHz | 950 MHz | 3 MB | Q1 2015 | $315 |
| Core i5 | 5200U | 2 (4) | HD 5500 | 2.2 GHz | 2.7 GHz | 2.5 GHz | 15 W | 600 MHz / 7.5 W | 300 MHz | 900 MHz | 3 MB | February 2015 | $281 |
| Core i3 | 5157U | 2 (4) | Iris 6100 | 2.5 GHz | —N/a | —N/a | 28 W | 600 MHz / 23 W | 300 MHz | 1 GHz | 3 MB | January 2015 | $315 |
| Core i3 | 5020U | 2 (4) | HD 5500 | 2.2 GHz | —N/a | —N/a | 28 W | 600 MHz / 10 W | 300 MHz | 900 MHz | 3 MB | March 2015 | $281 |
| Core i3 | 5015U | 2 (4) | HD 5500 | 2.1 GHz | —N/a | —N/a | 28 W | 600 MHz / 10 W | 300 MHz | 850 MHz | 3 MB | March 2015 | $275 |
| Core i3 | 5010U | 2 (4) | HD 5500 | 2.1 GHz | —N/a | —N/a | 28 W | 600 MHz / 10 W | 300 MHz | 900 MHz | 3 MB | January 2015 | $281 |
| Core i3 | 5005U | 2 (4) | HD 5500 | 2.0 GHz | —N/a | —N/a | 28 W | 600 MHz / 10 W | 300 MHz | 850 MHz | 3 MB | January 2015 | $275 |
| Pentium | 3825U | 2 (4) | HD Graphics | 1.9 GHz | —N/a | —N/a | 28 W | 600 MHz / 10 W | 300 MHz | 850 MHz | 2 MB | March 2015 | |
| Pentium | 3805U | 2 (2) | HD Graphics | 1.9 GHz | —N/a | —N/a | 28 W | 600 MHz / 10 W | 100 MHz | 800 MHz | 2 MB | Q1 2015 | $161 |
| Celeron | 3755U | 2 (2) | HD Graphics | 1.7 GHz | —N/a | —N/a | 28 W | 600 MHz / 10 W | 100 MHz | 800 MHz | 2 MB | Q1 2015 | $107 |
| Celeron | 3205U | 2 (2) | HD Graphics | 1.5 GHz | —N/a | —N/a | 28 W | 600 MHz / 10 W | 100 MHz | 800 MHz | 2 MB | Q1 2015 | $107 |

=== Core M Ultra Low Power Mobile Processors ===
| Processor branding | Model | Cores (Threads) | GPU Model | Programmable TDP | | | | CPU Turbo | Graphics Clock rate | | L3 Cache | Release Date | Price (USD) |
| Processor branding | Model | Cores (Threads) | GPU Model | SDP | cTDP down^{[a]} | Nominal TDP^{[b]} | cTDP up^{[c]} | 1-core | Normal | Turbo | L3 Cache | Release Date | Price (USD) |
|---|---|---|---|---|---|---|---|---|---|---|---|---|---|
| Core M (vPro) | 5Y71 | 2 (4) | HD 5300 (GT2) | 3.5 W | 3.5 W / 600 MHz | 4.5 W / 1.2 GHz | 6 W / 1.4 GHz | 2.9 GHz | 300 MHz | 900 MHz | 4 MB | October 27, 2014 | $281 |
| Core M (vPro) | 5Y70 | 2 (4) | HD 5300 (GT2) | —N/a | —N/a | 4.5 W / 1.1 GHz | —N/a | 2.6 GHz | 100 MHz | 850 MHz | 4 MB | September 5, 2014 | $281 |
| Core M | 5Y51 | 2 (4) | HD 5300 (GT2) | 3.5 W | 3.5 W / 600 MHz | 4.5 W / 1.1 GHz | 6 W / 1.3 GHz | 2.6 GHz | 300 MHz | 900 MHz | 4 MB | October 27, 2014 | $281 |
| Core M | 5Y31 | 2 (4) | HD 5300 (GT2) | 3.5 W | 3.5 W / 600 MHz | 4.5 W / 900 MHz | 6 W / 1.1 GHz | 2.4 GHz | 300 MHz | 850 MHz | 4 MB | October 27, 2014 | $281 |
| Core M | 5Y10c | 2 (4) | HD 5300 (GT2) | 3.5 W | 3.5 W / 600 MHz | 4.5 W / 800 MHz | 6 W / 1 GHz | 2.0 GHz | 300 MHz | 800 MHz | 4 MB | October 27, 2014 | $281 |
| Core M | 5Y10a | 2 (4) | HD 5300 (GT2) | —N/a | —N/a | 4.5 W / 800 MHz | —N/a | 2.0 GHz | 100 MHz | 800 MHz | 4 MB | September 5, 2014 | $281 |
| Core M | 5Y10 | 2 (4) | HD 5300 (GT2) | —N/a | 4 W / ? MHz | 4.5 W / 800 MHz | —N/a | 2.0 GHz | 100 MHz | 800 MHz | 4 MB | September 5, 2014 | $281 |

1. When a cooler or quieter mode of operation is desired, this mode specifies a lower TDP and lower guaranteed frequency versus the nominal mode.
2. This is the processor's rated frequency and TDP.
3. When extra cooling is available, this mode specifies a higher TDP and higher guaranteed frequency versus the nominal mode.

=== Server processors ===
==== SoC processors ====
| Processor branding | Model | Cores (threads) | Base frequency | Turbo frequency | | TDP | Socket | Memory | | L3 cache | Release date | Price (USD) |
| Processor branding | Model | Cores (threads) | Base frequency | Single core | All cores | TDP | Socket | Type | Channel | L3 cache | Release date | Price (USD) |
|---|---|---|---|---|---|---|---|---|---|---|---|---|
| Xeon D | D-1587 | 16 (32) | 1.7 GHz | —N/a | 2.3 GHz | 65 W | FCBGA 1667 | DDR4 up to 128 GB w/ ECC support | Dual | 24 MB | Q1 2016 | $1754 |
| Xeon D | D-1577 | 16 (32) | 1.3 GHz | —N/a | 2.1 GHz | 45 W | FCBGA 1667 | DDR4 up to 128 GB w/ ECC support | Dual | 24 MB | Q1 2016 | $1477 |
| Xeon D | D-1571 | 16 (32) | 1.3 GHz | —N/a | 2.1 GHz | 45 W | FCBGA 1667 | DDR4 up to 128 GB w/ ECC support | Dual | 24 MB | Q1 2016 | $1222 |
| Xeon D | D-1567 | 12 (24) | 2.1 GHz | —N/a | 2.7 GHz | 65 W | FCBGA 1667 | DDR4 up to 128 GB w/ ECC support | Dual | 18 MB | Q1 2016 | $1299 |
| Xeon D | D-1559 | 12 (24) | 1.5 GHz | —N/a | 2.1 GHz | 45 W | FCBGA 1667 | DDR4 up to 128 GB w/ ECC support | Dual | 18 MB | Q2 2016 | $883 |
| Xeon D | D-1557 | 12 (24) | 1.5 GHz | —N/a | 2.1 GHz | 45 W | FCBGA 1667 | DDR4 up to 128 GB w/ ECC support | Dual | 18 MB | Q1 2016 | $844 |
| Xeon D | D-1553N | 8 (16) | 2.3 GHz | —N/a | 2.7 GHz | 65 W | FCBGA 1667 | DDR4 up to 128 GB w/ ECC support | Dual | 12 MB | Q3 2017 | $855 |
| Xeon D | D-1548 | 8 (16) | 2.0 GHz | —N/a | 2.6 GHz | 45 W | FCBGA 1667 | DDR4 up to 128 GB w/ ECC support | Dual | 12 MB | Q4 2015 | $675 |
| Xeon D | D-1543N | 8 (16) | 1.9 GHz | —N/a | 2.4 GHz | 45 W | FCBGA 1667 | DDR4 up to 128 GB w/ ECC support | Dual | 12 MB | Q3 2017 | $652 |
| Xeon D | D-1541 | 8 (16) | 2.1 GHz | —N/a | 2.7 GHz | 45 W | FCBGA 1667 | DDR4 up to 128 GB w/ ECC support | Dual | 12 MB | Q4 2015 | $581 |
| Xeon D | D-1540 | 8 (16) | 2.0 GHz | —N/a | 2.6 GHz | 45 W | FCBGA 1667 | DDR4 up to 128 GB w/ ECC support | Dual | 12 MB | Q1 2015 | $581 |
| Xeon D | D-1539 | 8 (16) | 1.6 GHz | —N/a | 2.2 GHz | 35 W | FCBGA 1667 | DDR4 up to 128 GB w/ ECC support | Dual | 12 MB | Q2 2016 | $590 |
| Xeon D | D-1537 | 8 (16) | 1.7 GHz | —N/a | 2.3 GHz | 35 W | FCBGA 1667 | DDR4 up to 128 GB w/ ECC support | Dual | 12 MB | Q4 2015 | $571 |
| Xeon D | D-1533N | 6 (12) | 2.1 GHz | —N/a | 2.7 GHz | 45 W | FCBGA 1667 | DDR4 up to 128 GB w/ ECC support | Dual | 9 MB | Q3 2017 | $470 |
| Xeon D | D-1531 | 6 (12) | 2.2 GHz | —N/a | 2.7 GHz | 45 W | FCBGA 1667 | DDR4 up to 128 GB w/ ECC support | Dual | 9 MB | Q4 2015 | $348 |
| Xeon D | D-1529 | 4 (8) | 1.3 GHz | —N/a | 1.3 GHz | 20 W | FCBGA 1667 | DDR4 up to 128 GB w/ ECC support | Dual | 6 MB | Q2 2016 | $324 |
| Xeon D | D-1528 | 6 (12) | 1.9 GHz | —N/a | 2.5 GHz | 35 W | FCBGA 1667 | DDR4 up to 128 GB w/ ECC support | Dual | 9 MB | Q4 2015 | $389 |
| Xeon D | D-1527 | 4 (8) | 2.2 GHz | —N/a | 2.7 GHz | 35 W | FCBGA 1667 | DDR4 up to 128 GB w/ ECC support | Dual | 6 MB | Q4 2015 | $259 |
| Xeon D | D-1523N | 4 (8) | 2.0 GHz | —N/a | 2.6 GHz | 45 W | FCBGA 1667 | DDR4 up to 128 GB w/ ECC support | Dual | 6 MB | Q3 2017 | $256 |
| Xeon D | D-1521 | 4 (8) | 2.4 GHz | —N/a | 2.7 GHz | 45 W | FCBGA 1667 | DDR4 up to 128 GB w/ ECC support | Dual | 6 MB | Q4 2015 | $199 |
| Xeon D | D-1520 | 4 (8) | 2.2 GHz | —N/a | 2.6 GHz | 45 W | FCBGA 1667 | DDR4 up to 128 GB w/ ECC support | Dual | 6 MB | Q1 2015 | $199 |
| Xeon D | D-1518 | 4 (8) | 2.2 GHz | —N/a | 2.2 GHz | 35 W | FCBGA 1667 | DDR4 up to 128 GB w/ ECC support | Dual | 6 MB | Q4 2015 | $234 |
| Xeon D | D-1513N | 4 (8) | 1.6 GHz | —N/a | 2.2 GHz | 35 W | FCBGA 1667 | DDR4 up to 128 GB w/ ECC support | Dual | 6 MB | Q3 2017 | $192 |
| Pentium D | D1519 | 4 (8) | 1.5 GHz | —N/a | 2.1 GHz | 25 W | FCBGA 1667 | DDR4 up to 128 GB w/ ECC support | Dual | 6 MB | Q2 2016 | $200 |
| Pentium D | D1517 | 4 (8) | 1.6 GHz | —N/a | 2.2 GHz | 25 W | FCBGA 1667 | DDR4 up to 128 GB w/ ECC support | Dual | 6 MB | Q4 2015 | $194 |
| Pentium D | D1509 | 2 (2) | 1.5 GHz | —N/a | TBA | 19 W | FCBGA 1667 | DDR4 up to 128 GB w/ ECC support | Dual | 3 MB | Q4 2015 | $156 |
| Pentium D | D1508 | 2 (4) | 2.2 GHz | —N/a | 2.6 GHz | 25 W | FCBGA 1667 | DDR4 up to 128 GB w/ ECC support | Dual | 3 MB | Q4 2015 | $129 |
| Pentium D | D1507 | 2 (2) | 1.2 GHz | —N/a | TBA | 20 W | FCBGA 1667 | DDR4 up to 128 GB w/ ECC support | Dual | 3 MB | Q4 2015 | $103 |

==== Server CPUs ====
| Processor branding | Model | Cores (threads) | GPU model | CPU clock rate | | Graphics clock rate | | L3 cache | TDP | Release date | Release price (USD) tray / box | Motherboard | | |
| Processor branding | Model | Cores (threads) | GPU model | Normal | Turbo | Normal | Turbo | L3 cache | TDP | Release date | Release price (USD) tray / box | Socket | Interface | Memory |
|---|---|---|---|---|---|---|---|---|---|---|---|---|---|---|
| Xeon E3 v4 | 1285v4 | 4 (8) | Iris Pro P6300 | 3.5 GHz | 3.8 GHz | 300 MHz | 1.15 GHz | 6 MB | 95 W | Q2 15 | $556 / — | LGA; 1150 | DMI 2.0; PCIe 3.0 | DDR3 or DDR3L; 1333/1600/1866 with ECC |
| Xeon E3 v4 | 1285Lv4 | 4 (8) | Iris Pro P6300 | 3.4 GHz | 3.8 GHz | 300 MHz | 1.15 GHz | 6 MB | 65 W | Q2 15 | $445 / — | LGA; 1150 | DMI 2.0; PCIe 3.0 | DDR3 or DDR3L; 1333/1600/1866 with ECC |
| Xeon E3 v4 | 1265Lv4 | 4 (8) | Iris Pro P6300 | 2.3 GHz | 3.3 GHz | 300 MHz | 1.05 GHz | 6 MB | 35 W | Q2 15 | $417 / — | LGA; 1150 | DMI 2.0; PCIe 3.0 | DDR3 or DDR3L; 1333/1600/1866 with ECC |

==== Single/dual socket CPUs ====
- Socket: LGA 2011-3 Just like Haswell-EP, the Broadwell-EP Xeon E5 has three different die configurations. The largest die (454 mm^{2}), and highest core count (16 - 22) SKUs still work with a two-ring configuration connected by two bridges. The second configuration supports 12 to 15 cores and is a smaller version (306mm^{2}). These dies still have two memory controllers. The smallest 10-core die uses only one dual ring, two columns of cores, and only one memory controller.
- Interface: PCIe 3.0

| Processor branding | Model | Cores (threads) | CPU clock rate | | L3 cache | TDP | Release date | Release price | Sockets | Memory Support |
| Processor branding | Model | Cores (threads) | Normal | Turbo | L3 cache | TDP | Release date | Release price | Sockets | Memory Support |
|---|---|---|---|---|---|---|---|---|---|---|
| Xeon E5 v4 | 2699A v4 | 22 (44) | 2.4 GHz | 3.6 GHz | 55 MB | 145 W | Q2 16 | $4938 | 2 | DDR4; 1600/1866/2133/2400 with ECC (Note: 2696 v4 and 2686 v4 additionally supports, DDR3; 1333/1600/1866 with ECC) |
| Xeon E5 v4 | 2699 v4 | 22 (44) | 2.2 GHz | 3.6 GHz | 55 MB | 145 W | Q1 16 | $4115 | 2 | DDR4; 1600/1866/2133/2400 with ECC (Note: 2696 v4 and 2686 v4 additionally supports, DDR3; 1333/1600/1866 with ECC) |
| Xeon E5 v4 | 2698 v4 | 20 (40) | 2.2 GHz | 3.6 GHz | 50 MB | 135 W | Q1 16 | $3226 | 2 | DDR4; 1600/1866/2133/2400 with ECC (Note: 2696 v4 and 2686 v4 additionally supports, DDR3; 1333/1600/1866 with ECC) |
| Xeon E5 v4 | 2697 v4 | 18 (36) | 2.3 GHz | 3.6 GHz | 45 MB | 145 W | Q1 16 | $2702 | 2 | DDR4; 1600/1866/2133/2400 with ECC (Note: 2696 v4 and 2686 v4 additionally supports, DDR3; 1333/1600/1866 with ECC) |
| Xeon E5 v4 | 2697A v4 | 16 (32) | 2.6 GHz | 3.6 GHz | 40 MB | 145 W | Q1 16 | $2891 | 2 | DDR4; 1600/1866/2133/2400 with ECC (Note: 2696 v4 and 2686 v4 additionally supports, DDR3; 1333/1600/1866 with ECC) |
| Xeon E5 v4 | 2696 v4 | 22 (44) | 2.2 GHz | 3.7 GHz | 55 MB | 150 W | Q1 16 | OEM | 2 | DDR4; 1600/1866/2133/2400 with ECC (Note: 2696 v4 and 2686 v4 additionally supports, DDR3; 1333/1600/1866 with ECC) |
| Xeon E5 v4 | 2695 v4 | 18 (36) | 2.1 GHz | 3.3 GHz | 45 MB | 120 W | Q1 16 | $2424 | 2 | DDR4; 1600/1866/2133/2400 with ECC (Note: 2696 v4 and 2686 v4 additionally supports, DDR3; 1333/1600/1866 with ECC) |
| Xeon E5 v4 | 2690 v4 | 14 (28) | 2.6 GHz | 3.5 GHz | 35 MB | 135 W | Q1 16 | $2090 | 2 | DDR4; 1600/1866/2133/2400 with ECC (Note: 2696 v4 and 2686 v4 additionally supports, DDR3; 1333/1600/1866 with ECC) |
| Xeon E5 v4 | 2689 v4 | 10 (20) | 3.1 GHz | 3.8 GHz | 25 MB | 165 W | Q1 16 | $2723 | 2 | DDR4; 1600/1866/2133/2400 with ECC (Note: 2696 v4 and 2686 v4 additionally supports, DDR3; 1333/1600/1866 with ECC) |
| Xeon E5 v4 | 2687W v4 | 12 (24) | 3.0 GHz | 3.5 GHz | 30 MB | 160 W | Q1 16 | $2141 | 2 | DDR4; 1600/1866/2133/2400 with ECC (Note: 2696 v4 and 2686 v4 additionally supports, DDR3; 1333/1600/1866 with ECC) |
| Xeon E5 v4 | 2686 v4 | 18 (36) | 2.3 GHz | 3.0 GHz | 45 MB | 145 W | Q1 16 | OEM | 2 | DDR4; 1600/1866/2133/2400 with ECC (Note: 2696 v4 and 2686 v4 additionally supports, DDR3; 1333/1600/1866 with ECC) |
| Xeon E5 v4 | 2683 v4 | 16 (32) | 2.1 GHz | 3.0 GHz | 40 MB | 120 W | Q1 16 | $1846 | 2 | DDR4; 1600/1866/2133/2400 with ECC (Note: 2696 v4 and 2686 v4 additionally supports, DDR3; 1333/1600/1866 with ECC) |
| Xeon E5 v4 | 2680 v4 | 14 (28) | 2.4 GHz | 3.3 GHz | 35 MB | 120 W | Q1 16 | $1745 | 2 | DDR4; 1600/1866/2133/2400 with ECC (Note: 2696 v4 and 2686 v4 additionally supports, DDR3; 1333/1600/1866 with ECC) |
| Xeon E5 v4 | 2667 v4 | 8 (16) | 3.2 GHz | 3.6 GHz | 25 MB | 135 W | Q1 16 | $2057 | 2 | DDR4; 1600/1866/2133/2400 with ECC (Note: 2696 v4 and 2686 v4 additionally supports, DDR3; 1333/1600/1866 with ECC) |
| Xeon E5 v4 | 2660 v4 | 14 (28) | 2.0 GHz | 3.2 GHz | 35 MB | 105 W | Q1 16 | $1445 | 2 | DDR4; 1600/1866/2133/2400 with ECC (Note: 2696 v4 and 2686 v4 additionally supports, DDR3; 1333/1600/1866 with ECC) |
| Xeon E5 v4 | 2658 v4 | 14 (28) | 2.3 GHz | 2.8 GHz | 35 MB | 105 W | Q1 16 | $1832 | 2 | DDR4; 1600/1866/2133/2400 with ECC (Note: 2696 v4 and 2686 v4 additionally supports, DDR3; 1333/1600/1866 with ECC) |
| Xeon E5 v4 | 2650 v4 | 12 (24) | 2.2 GHz | 2.9 GHz | 30 MB | 105 W | Q1 16 | $1166 | 2 | DDR4; 1600/1866/2133/2400 with ECC (Note: 2696 v4 and 2686 v4 additionally supports, DDR3; 1333/1600/1866 with ECC) |
| Xeon E5 v4 | 2650L v4 | 14 (28) | 1.7 GHz | 2.5 GHz | 35 MB | 65 W | Q1 16 | $1329 | 2 | DDR4; 1600/1866/2133/2400 with ECC (Note: 2696 v4 and 2686 v4 additionally supports, DDR3; 1333/1600/1866 with ECC) |
| Xeon E5 v4 | 2648L v4 | 14 (28) | 1.8 GHz | 2.5 GHz | 35 MB | 75 W | Q1 16 | $1544 | 2 | DDR4; 1600/1866/2133/2400 with ECC (Note: 2696 v4 and 2686 v4 additionally supports, DDR3; 1333/1600/1866 with ECC) |
| Xeon E5 v4 | 2643 v4 | 6 (12) | 3.4 GHz | 3.7 GHz | 20 MB | 135 W | Q1 16 | $1552 | 2 | DDR4; 1600/1866/2133/2400 with ECC (Note: 2696 v4 and 2686 v4 additionally supports, DDR3; 1333/1600/1866 with ECC) |
| Xeon E5 v4 | 2640 v4 | 10 (20) | 2.4 GHz | 3.4 GHz | 25 MB | 90 W | Q1 16 | $939 | 2 | DDR4; 1600/1866/2133 with ECC |
| Xeon E5 v4 | 2637 v4 | 4 (8) | 3.5 GHz | 3.7 GHz | 15 MB | 135 W | Q1 16 | $996 | 2 | DDR4; 1600/1866/2133/2400 with ECC |
| Xeon E5 v4 | 2630 v4 | 10 (20) | 2.2 GHz | 3.1 GHz | 25 MB | 85 W | Q1 16 | $667 | 2 | DDR4; 1600/1866/2133 with ECC |
| Xeon E5 v4 | 2630L v4 | 10 (20) | 1.8 GHz | 2.9 GHz | 25 MB | 55 W | Q1 16 | $612 | 2 | DDR4; 1600/1866/2133 with ECC |
| Xeon E5 v4 | 2628L v4 | 12 (24) | 1.9 GHz | 2.4 GHz | 30 MB | 75 W | Q1 16 | $1364 | 2 | DDR4; 1600/1866/2133 with ECC |
| Xeon E5 v4 | 2623 v4 | 4 (8) | 2.6 GHz | 3.2 GHz | 10 MB | 85 W | Q1 16 | $444 | 2 | DDR4; 1600/1866/2133 with ECC |
| Xeon E5 v4 | 2620 v4 | 8 (16) | 2.1 GHz | 3.0 GHz | 20 MB | 85 W | Q1 16 | $417 | 2 | DDR4; 1600/1866/2133 with ECC |
| Xeon E5 v4 | 2618L v4 | 10 (20) | 2.2 GHz | 3.2 GHz | 25 MB | 75 W | Q1 16 | $779 | 2 | DDR4; 1600/1866/2133 with ECC |
| Xeon E5 v4 | 2609 v4 | 8 (8) | 1.7 GHz | 1.7 GHz | 20 MB | 85 W | Q1 16 | $306 | 2 | DDR4; 1600/1866 with ECC |
| Xeon E5 v4 | 2608L v4 | 8 (16) | 1.6 GHz | 1.7 GHz | 20 MB | 50 W | Q1 16 | $363 | 2 | DDR4; 1600/1866 with ECC |
| Xeon E5 v4 | 2603 v4 | 6 (6) | 1.7 GHz | 1.7 GHz | 15 MB | 85 W | Q1 16 | $213 | 2 | DDR4; 1600/1866 with ECC |
| Xeon E5 v4 | 1680 v4 | 8 (16) | 3.4 GHz | 4.0 GHz | 20 MB | 140 W | Q2 16 | $1723 | 1 | DDR4; 1600/1866/2133/2400 with ECC |
| Xeon E5 v4 | 1660 v4 | 8 (16) | 3.2 GHz | 3.8 GHz | 20 MB | 140 W | Q2 16 | $1113 | 1 | DDR4; 1600/1866/2133/2400 with ECC |
| Xeon E5 v4 | 1650 v4 | 6 (12) | 3.6 GHz | 4.0 GHz | 15 MB | 140 W | Q2 16 | $617 | 1 | DDR4; 1600/1866/2133/2400 with ECC |
| Xeon E5 v4 | 1630 v4 | 4 (8) | 3.7 GHz | 4.0 GHz | 10 MB | 140 W | Q2 16 | $406 | 1 | DDR4; 1600/1866/2133/2400 with ECC |
| Xeon E5 v4 | 1620 v4 | 4 (8) | 3.5 GHz | 3.8 GHz | 10 MB | 140 W | Q2 16 | $294 | 1 | DDR4; 1600/1866/2133/2400 with ECC |

== Roadmap and history ==
On September 10, 2013, Intel showcased the Broadwell 14 nm processor in a demonstration at IDF. Intel CEO Brian Krzanich claimed that the chip would allow systems to provide a 30 percent improvement in power use over the Haswell chips released in mid-2013. Krzanich also claimed that the chips would ship by the end of 2013; however, the shipment was delayed due to low yields from Intel's 14 nm process.

On October 21, 2013, a leaked Intel roadmap indicated a late 2014 or early 2015 release of the K-series Broadwell on the LGA 1150 platform, in parallel with the previously announced Haswell refresh. This would coincide with the release of Intel's 9-series chipset, which would be required for Broadwell processors due to a change in power specifications for its LGA 1150 socket.

On May 18, 2014, Reuters quoted Intel's CEO promising that Broadwell-based PCs would be on shelves for the holiday season, but probably not for the back-to-school shopping.

Mobile CPUs were expected in Q4 2014 and high-performance quad-core CPUs in 2015. The mobile CPUs would benefit from the reduced energy consumption of the die shrink.

On June 18, 2014, Intel told CNET that while some specialized Broadwell-based products would be out in Q4 2014, "broader availability" (including mobile CPUs) would only happen in 2015.

As of July 2014, Broadwell CPUs were available to Intel's hardware partners in sample quantities. Intel was expected to release 17 Broadwell U series family microprocessors at CES 2015. Also, according to a leak posted on vr-zone, Broadwell-E chips would be available in 2016.

On August 11, 2014, Intel unveiled formally its 14 nm manufacturing process, and indicated that mobile variants of the process would be known as Core M products. Additionally, Core M products were announced to be shipping during the end of 2014, with desktop variants shipping shortly after.

With Broadwell, Intel focused mainly on laptops, miniature desktops, and all-in-one systems. This left traditional desktop users with no new socketed CPU options beyond fourth-generation Haswell, which first arrived in 2013. Even though the company finally introduced two Broadwell desktop chips in the summer of 2015, it launched its high-end sixth-generation Skylake CPUs very shortly thereafter. In September 2015, Kirk Skaugen, senior vice president and general manager of Intel's Client Computing Group, admitted that skipping desktops with Broadwell was a poor decision. Between the end-of-life for Windows XP in 2014 and the lack of new desktop chips, Intel had not given desktop PC users any good reasons to upgrade in 2015.

=== Releases ===
On September 5, 2014, Intel launched the first three Broadwell-based processors that belong to the low-TDP Core M family, Core M 5Y10, Core M 5Y10a and Core M 5Y70.

On October 9, 2014, the first laptop with Broadwell Intel Core M 5Y70 CPU, Lenovo Yoga 3 Pro, was launched.

On October 31, 2014, four more Broadwell based CPUs were launched belonging to Core M Family, increasing the number of launched Broadwell CPUs to seven.

On January 5, 2015, 17 additional Broadwell laptop CPUs were launched for the Celeron, Pentium and Core i3, i5 and i7 series.

On March 31, 2016, Intel officially launched 14 nm Broadwell-EP Xeon E5 V4 CPUs.

On May 30, 2016, Intel officially launched 14 nm Broadwell-E Core i7 69xx/68xx processor family.

== See also ==
- List of Intel CPU microarchitectures
- List of Intel Core M microprocessors

== Notes ==
| Atom (ULV) | | Node name | Pentium/Core | | | | | | |
| Microarch. | Step | Node name | Microarch. | Step | | | | | |
| | | 600 nm | P6 | Pentium Pro (133 MHz) | | | | | |
| | | 500 nm | P6 | Pentium Pro (150 MHz) | | | | | |
| | | 350 nm | P6 | Pentium Pro (166–200 MHz) | | | | | |
| | | 350 nm | P6 | Klamath | | | | | |
| | | 250 nm | P6 | Deschutes | | | | | |
| | | 250 nm | P6 | Katmai | NetBurst | | | | |
| | | 180 nm | P6 | Coppermine | Willamette | | | | |
| | | 130 nm | P6 | Tualatin | Northwood | | | | |
| | | 130 nm | Pentium M (P6) | Banias | Northwood | | NetBurst(HT) | | NetBurst(×2) |
| | | 90 nm | Pentium M (P6) | Dothan | Prescott | ⇨ | Prescott‑2M | ⇨ | Smithfield |
| | | 90 nm | Pentium M (P6) | Dothan | ~~Tejas~~ | → | ⇩ | → | ~~Cedarmill (Tejas)~~ |
| | | 65 nm | Pentium M (P6) | Yonah | ~~Nehalem (NetBurst)~~ | | Cedar Mill | ⇨ | Presler |
| | | 65 nm | Core | Merom | 4 cores on mainstream desktop, DDR3 introduced | | | | |
| Bonnell | Bonnell | 45 nm | Core | Penryn | | | | | |
| Bonnell | Bonnell | 45 nm | Nehalem | Nehalem | HT reintroduced, integrated MC, PCH; L3-cache introduced, 256 KB L2-cache/core | | | | |
| Bonnell | Saltwell | 32 nm | Nehalem | Westmere | Introduced GPU on same package and AES-NI | | | | |
| Bonnell | Saltwell | 32 nm | Sandy Bridge | Sandy Bridge | On-die ring bus, no more non-UEFI motherboards | | | | |
| Silvermont | Silvermont | 22 nm | Sandy Bridge | Ivy Bridge | | | | | |
| Silvermont | Silvermont | 22 nm | Haswell | Haswell | Fully integrated voltage regulator | | | | |
| Silvermont | Airmont | 14 nm | Haswell | Broadwell | | | | | |
| Silvermont | Airmont | 14 nm | Skylake | Skylake | DDR4 introduced on mainstream desktop | | | | |
| Goldmont | | 14 nm | Skylake | Kaby Lake | | | | | |
| Goldmont | | 14 nm | Skylake | Coffee Lake | 6 cores on mainstream desktop | | | | |
| Goldmont | | 14 nm | Skylake | Amber Lake | Mobile-only | | | | |
| Goldmont Plus | | 14 nm | Skylake | Whiskey Lake | Mobile-only | | | | |
| Goldmont Plus | | 14 nm | Skylake | Coffee Lake Refresh | 8 cores on mainstream desktop | | | | |
| Goldmont Plus | | 14 nm | Skylake | Comet Lake | 10 cores on mainstream desktop | | | | |
| Goldmont Plus | | 14 nm | Sunny Cove | Cypress Cove (Rocket Lake) | Backported Sunny Cove microarchitecture for 14 nm | | | | |
| Tremont | | 10 nm | Skylake | Palm Cove (Cannon Lake) | Mobile-only | | | | |
| Tremont | | 10 nm | Sunny Cove | Sunny Cove (Ice Lake) | 512 KB L2-cache/core | | | | |
| Tremont | | 10 nm | Sunny Cove | Willow Cove (Tiger Lake) | X^{e} graphics engine | | | | |
| Gracemont | | Intel 7 (10 nm ESF) | Golden Cove | Golden Cove (Alder Lake) | Hybrid, DDR5, PCIe 5.0 | | | | |
| Gracemont | | Intel 7 (10 nm ESF) | Golden Cove | Raptor Cove (Raptor Lake) | | | | | |
| Crestmont | | Intel 4 | Redwood Cove | Meteor Lake | Mobile-only; NPU, chiplet architecture | | | | |
| Crestmont | | Intel 3 | Redwood Cove | Arrow Lake-U | | | | | |
| Skymont | | TSMC N3B | Lion Cove | Lunar Lake | Low power mobile only (9–30 W) | | | | |
| Skymont | | TSMC N3B | Lion Cove | Arrow Lake | | | | | |
| Darkmont | | Intel 18A | Cougar Cove | Panther Lake | | | | | |
| Arctic Wolf | | Intel 18A and/or TSMC N2P | Coyote Cove | Nova Lake | | | | | |
