= Tolleshunt Major =

Village in Essex, England

Coordinates: 51.76805°N 0.75224°E

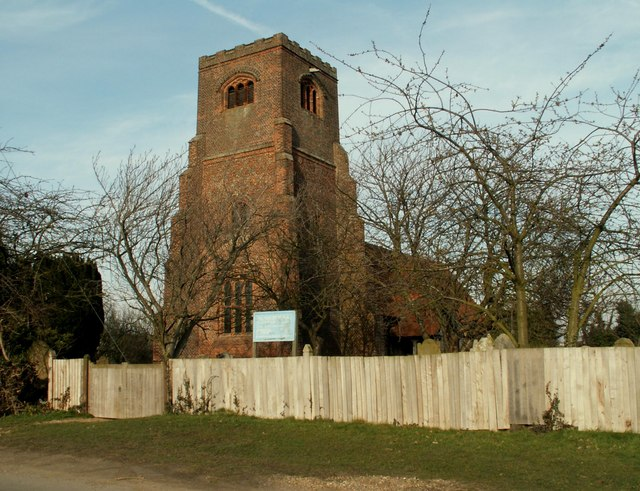
- St Nicholas's Church, Tolleshunt Major

- Location within Essex
- Population: 729 (Parish, 2021)
- OS grid reference: TL900113
- Civil parish: Tolleshunt D'Arcy
- District: Maldon
- Shire county: Essex
- Region: East
- Country: England
- Sovereign state: United Kingdom
- Post town: MALDON
- Postcode district: CM9
- Dialling code: 01621
- Police: Essex
- Fire: Essex
- Ambulance: East of England
- UK Parliament: Witham

Tolleshunt Major (/ˈtoʊlzhʌnt/ TOHLZ-hunt) is a village and civil parish in the Maldon District of Essex, England. It lies 5 miles (8 km) north-east of the town of Maldon on the northern bank of the River Blackwater. At the 2021 census the parish had a population of 729.

== History ==
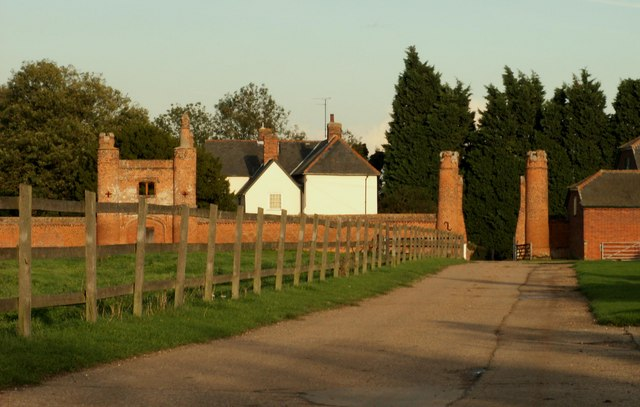
Side view of Beckingham Manor

The Tolleshunt group of villages (Major, Knights, D'Arcy and Tollesbury) grew up in the area settled by the Saxon chief Toll who cleared areas of forest round local water sources. Tolleshunta was the Anglo Saxon name for Toll's spring. The name Tolleshunt Major (or Mauger as it was previously known), was granted by King Henry VIII to Stephen Beckenham, in 1544. Beckenham bought various landscapes in and around the village and built a semi-fortified manor house with a turreted gatehouse within a red-brick boundary wall. This became known as "Beckingham House". The house was demolished in 1782 and was replaced by a farmhouse. The former gatehouse which formed part of Beckingham Manor, complete with turrets and boundary wall still remain.

In 1609, Beckingham completed the design and construction of a heraldic shield which featured statuettes of himself and his wife Alvis Beckingham (née Terral). The monument was displayed at the parish church of St. Nicholas. This has since been pulled down and scrapped.

=== Beckingham family ===
The Beckingham family originally came from Wiltshire. Stephen's son Thomas Beckingham received a knighthood and died in 1633. His son, William, became heir to the estate aged 12. The estate was eventually sold to Sir Thomas Adams, an alderman from London. The manor house changed hands several times before eventually becoming the property of the current owners.

== Geography ==
Tolleshunt Major's only streets are Beckingham Street, Bakers Lane, Mill Lane, Witham Road, Tudwick Road and Tolleshunt D'Arcy Road, all situated within the built-up part of the village, which consists of just over one hundred dwellings.

The village's parish boundaries stretch as far as Little Totham, taking in parts of Sawyers Lane and Plains Road. Other rural parts of the village include Church Road to the east, Tudwick Road to the north, Sawyers Lane and Plains Road to the west, and parts of Scraley Road, Wash Lane and Bakers Green to the south.

The village, which is not on any main road, is bordered by the villages of Little Totham, Goldhanger, Tolleshunt D'Arcy, Tolleshunt Knights and Great Totham North and South. Nearby towns include Maldon, Colchester, Chelmsford and Tiptree.

== Economy ==
Tolleshunt Major is host to The Beckingham Business park which has a small number of businesses, ranging from a transport company to a sports equipment manufacturing company. There are no street lights, mains gas supply or bus service apart from a schools service in the village.

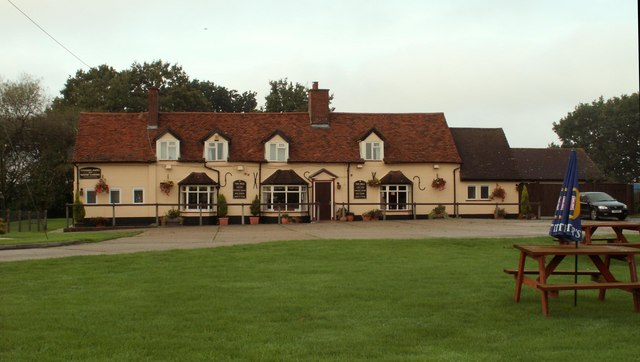
The Beckingham Bell

The village has one public house called the Beckingham Bell which is situated in Beckingham Street.

The village does have one small shop on Wicks Manor Farm situated in Tolleshunt Major which is owned by Howies & Sons. Wicks Manor Farm is a Local Essex farm which produces dry cured bacon, sausages, ham, gammons and pork.

Other shops can be found in Tiptree which is about a ten-minute drive where large supermarkets can be found as well as fast food restaurants, newsagents, a post office, hair salons, doctors and pharmacists. Also in Tiptree is the jam factory owned by Wilkin & Sons Limited. Bigger shopping centres are at Chelmsford City about 30 minutes drive away and Colchester Town about 30 minutes away.

== Governance ==
There are three tiers of local government covering Tolleshunt Major, at parish, district, and county level: Tolleshunt Major Parish Council, Maldon District Council, and Essex County Council. The parish council meets at St Nicholas Hall.

== Public transport ==
=== Bus ===
There is no bus service that runs through Tolleshunt Major. Buses can be boarded at the nearby village of Tolleshunt D’arcy. Other villages served are Maldon, Chelmsford and Witham.

=== Railway ===
The closest National Rail stations are Witham and Hatfield Peveral, both are operated by Greater Anglia. Destinations served from these stations include London Liverpool Street and Ipswich, Clacton, Harwich, Braintree and Norwich via the Great Eastern Main Line. The nearest London Underground line is the Central Line at Stratford International.

== Schools ==
There are no schools in the village of Tolleshunt Major, the nearest primary school being in Tolleshunt D'arcy.

== Healthcare ==
The nearest NHS(National Health Service (England)) hospitals are Broomfield Hospital in Chelmsford. or Colchester General, in Highwoods, Colchester.
