= Tolleshunt =

Tolleshunt may refer to the following places in Essex, England:

- Tolleshunt D'Arcy
- Tolleshunt Knights
- Tolleshunt Major
