= Great Braxted =

Village in Essex, England

Coordinates: 51.795°N 0.699°E

- Location within Essex
- Population: 384 (Parish, 2021)
- OS grid reference: TL 862 141
- District: Maldon
- Shire county: Essex
- Region: East
- Country: England
- Sovereign state: United Kingdom
- Post town: Witham
- Postcode district: CM8
- Police: Essex
- Fire: Essex
- Ambulance: East of England
- UK Parliament: Witham

Great Braxted is a village between Great Totham and Tiptree in Essex, England. At the 2021 census the parish had a population of 384. The local manor house is known as Braxted Park. The medieval All Saints' church is contained within its 2,000-acre estate.

The place-name 'Braxted' is first attested in the Domesday Book of 1086, where it appears as Brachesteda. The name comes from the Old English 'braec', meaning 'newly cultivated land'. Great Braxted is first attested (in Latin) as Magna Bracsted in 1206, whilst Little Braxted is first attested as Parva Bracstede in 1254.

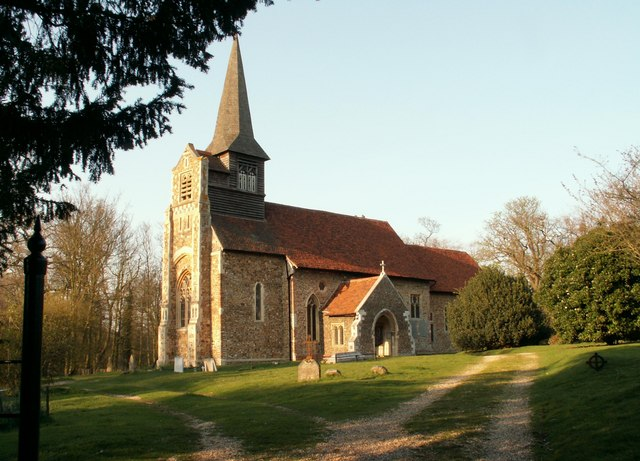
All Saints' church, Great Braxted
