= Little Scarlet =

Variety of strawberry

Little Scarlet is a type of Fragaria virginiana, a wild strawberry, and the name of a jam made from it. The species of strawberry is from North America but this selection is grown only in Britain.

This tiny berry is approximately one fifth the size of a commercially cultivated strawberry, similar in size to the alpine or wood strawberry. The plant was brought to Britain in the 1900s by C.J. Wilkin, a member of the family who own the Wilkin & Sons conserve manufacturing company in Tiptree, Essex, following a visit to the United States where the plant grew wild. The company seems to be the only commercial grower of this fruit anywhere in the world. The Little Scarlet conserve sells in around fifty countries at prices up to US$19 for a 12 oz jar.

== Cultural references ==
According to her former chef, Queen Elizabeth II would eat the product when her preferred home-made jam is unavailable.

Ian Fleming portrays James Bond's favorite breakfast to include the product in From Russia, with Love. Pulitzer Prize-winner Philip Roth often wrote about the product, including in Sabbath's Theater.
