= Tiptree Parish Field =

Nature Reserve

Coordinates: 51.8133°N 0.75331°E

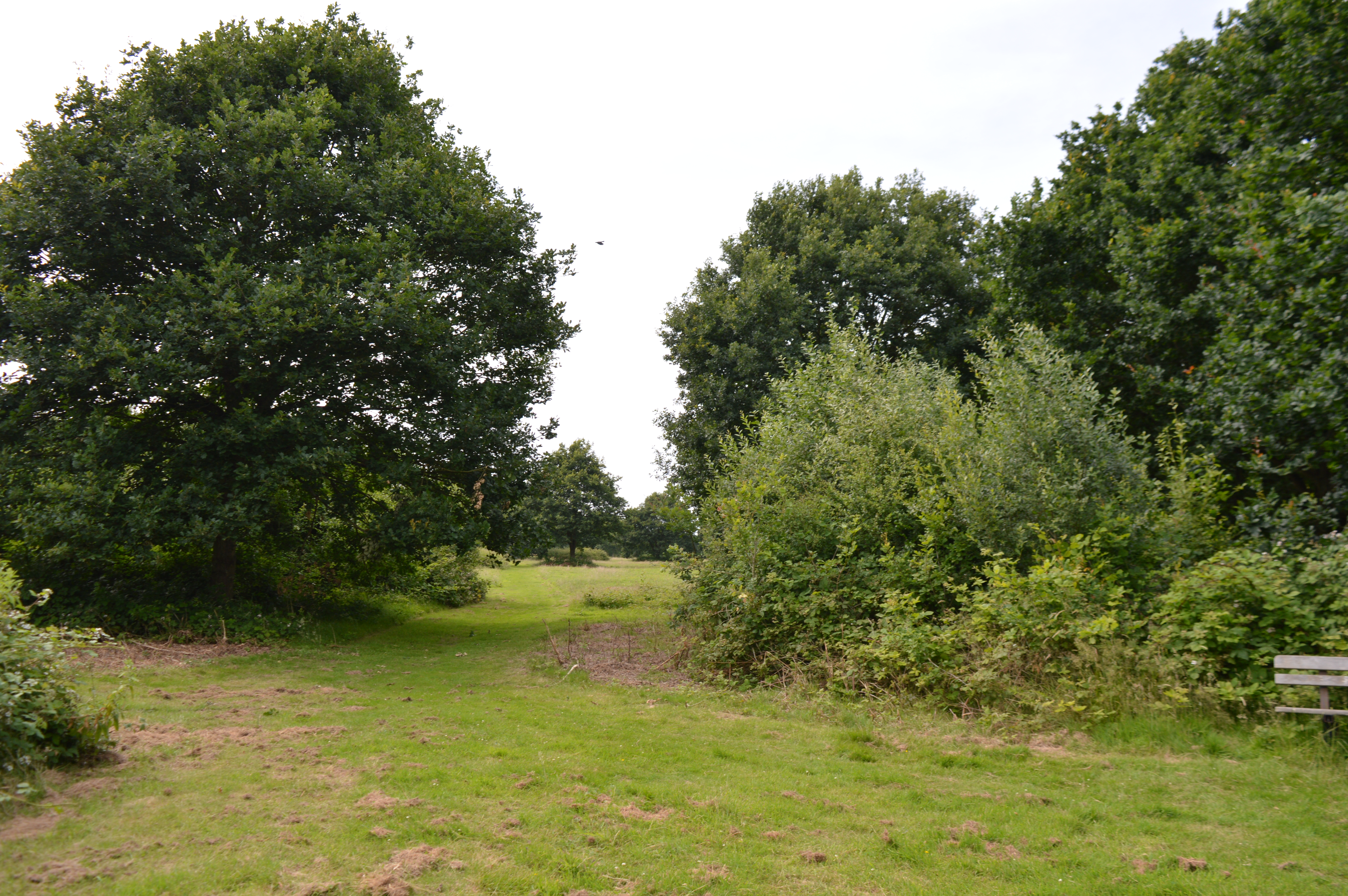
- Interactive map of Tiptree Parish Field
- Type: Local Nature Reserve
- Location: Tiptree, Essex
- OS grid: TL 898 163
- Area: 2.2 hectares (5.4 acres)
- Manager: Tiptree Parish Council

Tiptree Parish Field is a 2.2 hectare Local Nature Reserve in Tiptree in Essex, England. It is owned and managed by Tiptree Parish Council.

The site is on a field adjacent to Park Lane, an ancient road between Tiptree and Tolleshunt Knights. In 1976 the council purchased the land for sports facilities, but these were never constructed due to shortage of funds, and in the 1990s the area became a nature reserve. It has acid rough grassland with young oak woodland, and a pond which was created by widening Layer Brook.

There is access to the site from Park Lane, off Newbridge Road. Tiptree Parish Field is the eastern half of the larger Park Lane Nature Reserve.
