= List of the largest villages in England =

Several places claim to be the largest village in England. This title is disputed as there is no standard definition of a village as distinct from a town and 'largest' can refer to population or area.

A typical contender is Lancing in West Sussex with a population of around 19,000. Whilst Lancing might be described as a town in everyday use, it has not formally taken on this status and, in this case with three tiers of local government, it has a parish council rather than a town council. Also, it has a village hall instead of a town hall. All claimants must avoid having had a town charter or licence to hold a market from the Crown. Many other villages are in a similar position. Some of the claimants below, such as Cottingham, Great Baddow, Lancing and Rawmarsh, are part of larger urban areas and it can be contended that such claimants are suburbs or 'suburban villages' rather than 'standalone villages' which have a clear surrounding open space buffer zone.

The old simple definitions of a town is a settlement with:

- town charters (see the list of towns in England); or
- with a regular market.

These two features have been long surpassed by large 'new towns' on former villages such as Harlow which have neither feature yet have virtually no claims that they are villages.

The claim is therefore complicated by disputes over what renders a village a town, the usual trichotomy in current use of British English being village, town or city.

== Typical factors ==
Definitions can refer to history of population growth or popular formulae based on types and quantities of key buildings (e.g. schools, retailers, railway/tram station, more than one church or community hall), limited business parks and maximum limits to the density of housing. The few large dispersed settlements, historically tied to one church community, and major changes to boundaries allow more elaborate claims. A third common criterion is simply stating it is a 'village' in a nameplate or whole community organisation, which leads to city district such as Blackheath, London having a strong claim.

=== Impact of postal towns and boroughs ===
The country is split up into postal towns: settlements from village to city scale that can contrast markedly, but are carefully cited by some village contenders to rule out other villages. Others point to the fact that a rival village is in a borough.

=== Parish criterion ===
The typical English local government district contains a variety of settlements and, while planning law encourages the existence of buffers, the term village has no formal use and wards are not permanently fixed. Civil parishes exist in many such districts to add an extra rung to local government, with fewer major changes – they can contain divorced villages, neighbourhoods hamlets, often based on old ties to what was one community, an ecclesiastical parish which may be lost, such as by the building of a motorway.

=== Popular definitions and changes ===
Popularly, many settlements are described both as a town and a village by different people and/or can change over small areas. For example, Hebden Bridge in West Yorkshire is widely considered a "town" yet its population is half that of Birstall in the same county, most organisations of which and writers about which describe it as a village.

Furthermore, settlements have a tendency to become denser and/or expand wider and, when they do, many residents may prefer to think of their home as a village rather than a town, and institutions such as a village green or village hall will tend to retain the name that they were given when the settlement was smaller. Since 1974, separation of rural settlements from urban settlements has not been important for local authorities themselves, and became less so with the new top-level authorities created that year e.g. Bessacarr, South Yorkshire was not part of the town of Doncaster before 1974; it is often spoken of as a suburb of Doncaster now, but, where described as a village today, then it was a ward with Cantley having 14,408 people in 2011.

=== Consensus ===
Such difficulties in measurement, and desires for different organisations to be called a town or a village, mean that the media has been free to pick whichever criteria it sees fit when choosing whether to describe a settlement as a town or a village.

== Contenders ==
Places for which this claim has been made, and the reported population in the 2011 census (most recent all households census) include:

| Village | Ceremonial county | Population 2011 Census | Area (km²) | Notes on basis of claim |
|---|---|---|---|---|
| Bradfield | South Yorkshire | 17,100 | 142.92 | Largest civil parish. No more than 500 metres (550 yd) separates High Bradfield from Low Bradfield its twin settlements. |
| Great Baddow | Essex | 14,650 | | Contiguous with the city of Chelmsford. Stated on its visitessex.com page as one of the largest villages in England by population size, although the official census population figure is actually higher. |
| Broughton Astley | Leicestershire | 11,940 | | Broughton Astley is a large village and civil parish located in the Harborough district of Leicestershire, England. |
| Rawmarsh | South Yorkshire | 13,389 | 6.63 | One ward, buffered. No civil parish council |
| Chalfont St Peter | Buckinghamshire | 12,766 | 16.1 | Contiguous with Chalfont St Giles. |
| Cranleigh | Surrey | 11,492 | 32.78 | Based on area. |
| Cottingham | East Riding of Yorkshire | 17,164 | 12.13 | Has made the claim on the basis of including the grounds of Cottingham Manor. Contiguous with Kingston upon Hull. |
| Horsforth | West Yorkshire | 18,895 | 8.07 | Claim made in 19th century – parish council converted in name to a 'town council'. Contiguous with Leeds. |
| Kidlington | Oxfordshire | 15,046 | 9.12 | Described by its parish council as the "second largest village in England". |
| Lancing | West Sussex | 18,810 | 14.14 | Adjacent to Shoreham by Sea – though largely separated by the River Adur and land covering Brighton Airport and farms. |
| Heath Hayes and Wimblebury | Staffordshire | 14,085 | 4.17 | |
| Wombourne | Staffordshire | 14,157 | 11.84 | |
| Ecclesfield | South Yorkshire | 32,073 | 21.36 | The most populous civil parish in England not to meet either of the two official town criteria, nor a new town. |
| Rustington | West Sussex | 13,883 | 3.72 | Often described as a sleepy village, Rustington has never acquired town status, despite its size. |

Unusual claims
| Village | Ceremonial county | Population 2011 Census | Area (km²) | Notes on basis of claim |
|---|---|---|---|---|
| Bembridge | Isle of Wight | 3,688 | 9.130 | Claimed by a personal website to be the "largest village in Europe" based on parish council control, claiming that larger contenders are town council controlled |
| Tiptree | Essex | 9,152 | 2.36 | Location of the Wilkin & Sons factory for Tiptree Jam. A referendum held in 1999 asked residents of Tiptree whether they wanted to remain a village, with the results being overwhelmingly in favour. |
| Theydon Bois | Essex | 4,062 | 8.32 | No street lighting |
| Meopham | Kent | 6,722 | 17 | Although not the largest by population or area, Meopham is claimed to be the longest village in Europe, being 7 miles (11 km) in length. |
| Mark | Somerset | 1,478 | Unknown | The Mark Parish Council website claims that the village is in the Guinness Book of Records as the longest in the United Kingdom, but a Guinness World Records spokesperson replying to SomersetLive said that the claim cannot be confirmed. |
