= Messing-cum-Inworth =

Civil parish in Essex

Coordinates: 51.832°N 0.740°E

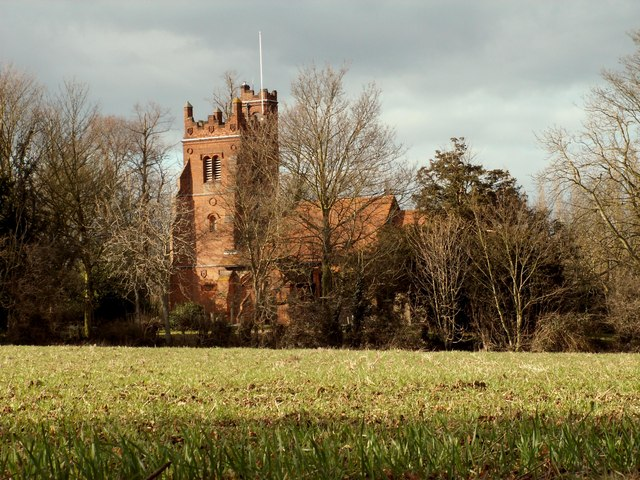
- All Saints' Church, Inworth

- Location within Essex
- Population: 400 (Parish, 2021)
- Civil parish: Messing-cum-Inworth
- District: Colchester
- Shire county: Essex
- Region: East
- Country: England
- Sovereign state: United Kingdom

Messing-cum-Inworth is a civil parish in the Colchester district, in north-east Essex, 8.5 miles west of Colchester, and 15 miles east of Chelmsford. The parish consists of two small villages; Messing and Inworth, which were formerly separate parishes; the modern parish was created in 1934. At the 2021 census the parish had a population of 400.

== Geography ==
The parish of Messing-cum-Inworth is bounded by the parishes of Kelvedon to the west, Feering to the north, Birch to the east and Tiptree to the south. The highest point in the parish is no more than 69 metres (226 ft) above sea level dropping to 32 metres (105 ft) in the vicinity of Domsey Brook. It is situated in the Birch & Winstree ward of Colchester Borough Council. Amenities in Messing include Messing Primary School, a church, a pub/restaurant, and a large garden centre, while Inworth hosts most of the small businesses in the parish.

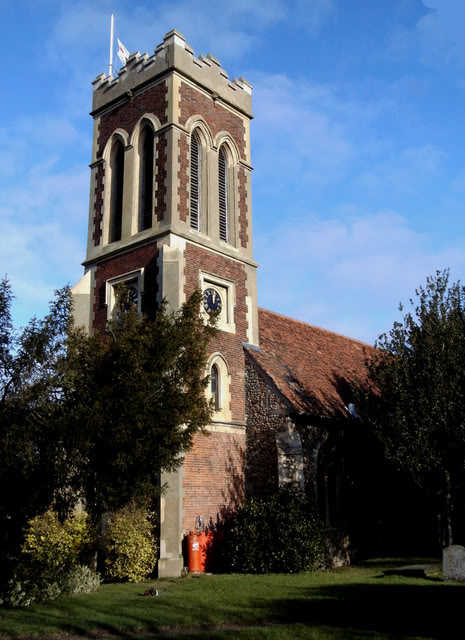
All Saints' Church, Messing

== History ==
Inworth and Messing were both ancient parishes in the Lexden hundred of Essex. Both parishes included parts of the urban area of Tiptree to the south. In 1934 a new parish of Tiptree was created, taking areas from both Inworth and Messing. The remainders of those two parishes were merged into a new civil parish called Messing-cum-Inworth at the same time, subject to some minor adjustments to the boundaries with other neighbouring parishes.

== Notable residents ==
- John Haynes – First Governor of Connecticut, 1639–54
- Reynald Bush (1593–1670) – Patrilineal ancestor of George H. W. Bush and George W. Bush; the last such ancestor to be born in England
