= Inworth =

Village in Essex, England

Coordinates: 51°49′N 0°44′E

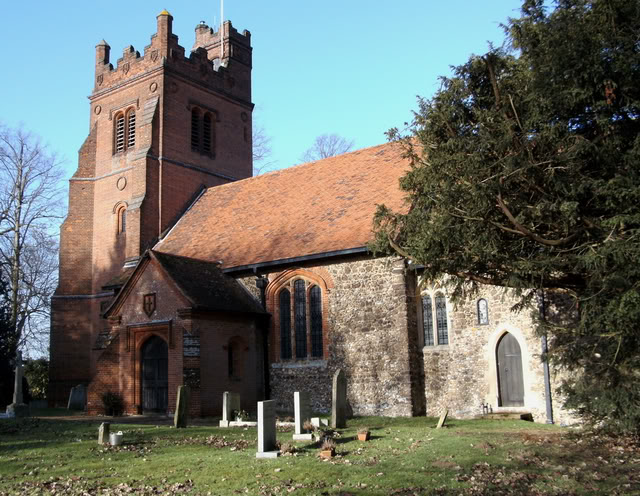
- All Saints' Church

- Location within Essex
- Civil parish: Messing-cum-Inworth
- District: Colchester
- Shire county: Essex
- Region: East
- Country: England
- Sovereign state: United Kingdom

Inworth is a small village and in the civil parish of Messing-cum-Inworth, in the Colchester district of Essex, England, near to Tiptree.

Inworth village dates back to medieval times, and has been known in the past as Ineworth, Inneworth, Inneworde and Inford. A placename close to the modern name is first attested in the Curia Regis Rolls of 1206, where it appears as Inewrth. This derives from Ina's worþ ("Ina's homestead").

The grave of local celebrity 'Spotty', a faithful golden retriever, can be found by the village post office, attracting many visitors. His ghost is said to haunt the meat shop on the corner.

All Saints' Church dates from the 11th century and is a grade I listed building.

Inworth was an ancient parish in the Lexden hundred of Essex. The parish was abolished in 1934; the southern end of the parish was added to the new parish of Tiptree, a small area was transferred to Feering, and the remainder merged with Messing to form a new civil parish called Messing-cum-Inworth. At the 1931 census (the last before the abolition of the civil parish), Inworth had a population of 847.
