= Messing, Essex =

Village in Essex, England

Coordinates: 51.835618°N 0.750509°E

Messing
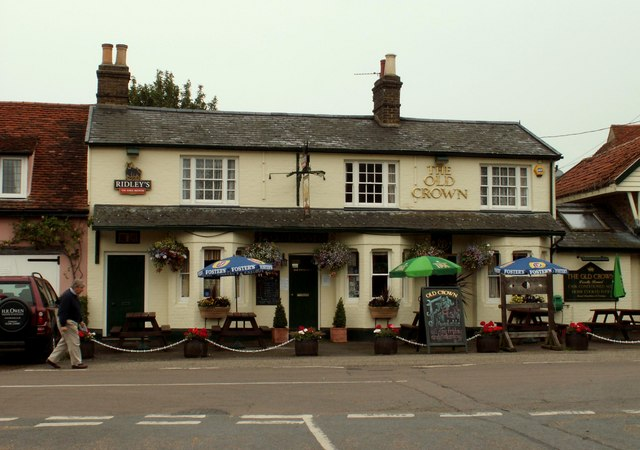
- The Old Crown

- Location within Essex
- Population: 300 (around)
- OS grid reference: TL887617
- Civil parish: Messing-cum-Inworth
- District: Colchester
- Shire county: Essex
- Region: East
- Country: England
- Sovereign state: United Kingdom
- Police: Essex
- Fire: Essex
- Ambulance: East of England

Messing is a village in the civil parish of Messing-cum-Inworth in the City of Colchester district of Essex, England. It lies 14 miles (23 km) north east of Chelmsford, The village has a population of around 300.

== Features ==
Messing has a church called All Saints and a pub called The Old Crown.

== History ==
The name "Messing" means 'Maecca's people'. Messing was recorded in the Domesday Book as Metcinges.

Messing was an ancient parish in the Lexden hundred of Essex. The parish was effectively abolished in 1934; the southern end of the parish was added to the new parish of Tiptree, a small area was transferred to Layer Marney, and almost all the remainder merged with Inworth to form a new civil parish called Messing-cum-Inworth. It subsequently emerged that the plans accompanying the 1934 order had failed to account for one 3 acre field from the old Messing parish north of Cantfield Farm. Having not been assigned to any other parish, this field continued to be the parish of Messing, which had therefore not been completely abolished as intended in 1934. An inquiry in 1937 recommended adding this uninhabited single field parish of Messing to the neighbouring parish of Birch; a recommendation which was eventually put into effect in 1946, finally abolishing Messing parish. At the 1931 census (the last before the abolition of the civil parish), Messing had a population of 929.
