= John Joseph Mechi =

British silversmith and alderman (1802–1880)

Alderman John Joseph Mechi
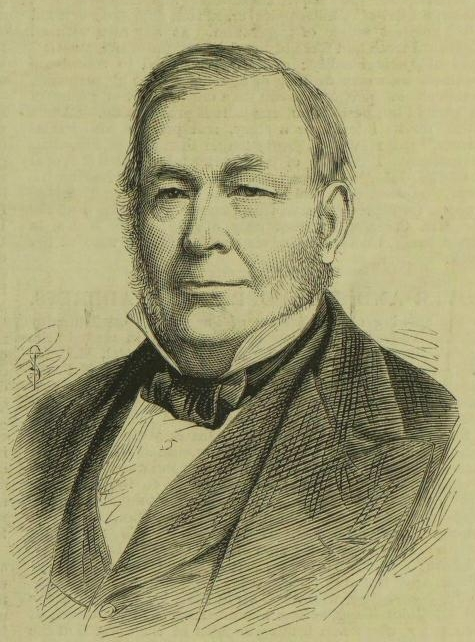
- Born: 22 May 1802; London, England
- Died: 26 December 1880 (aged 78); Tiptree Hall, Essex, England
- Resting place: Tiptree
- Occupations: silversmith; banker
- Known for: Alderman of the City of London; Farming improvements

Alderman John Joseph Mechi (1802–1880) was a silversmith, banker, inventor and Alderman of the City of London. He experimented with new farming methods on his estate at Tiptree in Essex.

Mechi was born in London 22 May 1802, the third son of Giacomo Mechi, a citizen of Bologna, who had settled in England early in life, was naturalised, and obtained a post at Kensington Palace in the household of George III. His mother was Elizabeth, daughter of J. Beyer of Poland Street, London. John at the age of sixteen was placed as a clerk in a house in Walbrook, trading with Newfoundland, a job he had for ten years. In 1828 he set up on his own account as a cutler in a small workshop at 130 Leadenhall Street, from where he removed to No. 4 in the same street in 1830. Between 1830 and 1840 he made his fortune through the 'magic razor strop' which bears his name After the Crimean War and a fashion for beards, sales declined. On 10 November 1840 he took out a patent for 'improvements in apparatus to be applied to lamps in order to carry off heat and the products of consumption'. This was for the external shop-window lamps. From 1859 to 1869 he was in partnership with Charles Bazan, and then gave up his city business and moved to 112, Regent Street.

In 1841, after studying English farming, he became interested in improvements in agriculture, and accordingly purchased a farm of about 130 acres, including Tiptree Hall, at Tiptree Heath, one of the least productive districts in Essex. Here he tried deep drainage and the application of steam power, and made the farm profitable. The press acknowledged the services he had rendered to agricultural science by the introduction of modern processes into his model farm. He was appointed to the shrievalty of London in 1856, and in 1858 elected an alderman of the city. He was a member of the council of the Society of Arts, and was a juror in the department of art and science at The Great Exhibition of 1851 and at the Paris Exposition Universelle of 1855. His 1857 publication, How to Farm Profitably, had in various forms a circulation of ten thousand copies.

The failure of the Unity Joint Stock Bank in 1866, of which he was a governor, and an unfortunate connection with the Unity Fire and General Life Assurance Office, caused him such heavy losses that, instead of becoming Lord Mayor of London, he was in August 1866 obliged to resign his aldermanic gown. Many bad seasons followed at Tiptree farm, particularly that of 1879, and at last, worn out with diabetes and broken-hearted, his affairs were put in liquidation on 14 December 1880. He died at Tiptree Hall on 26 December 1880, and was buried in Tiptree Church on 1 January 1881. He was married twice; firstly, in 1823, to Fanny Frost, and secondly, in 1846, Charlotte, daughter of Francis Ward of Chillesford, Suffolk. A subscription was made for his widow and daughters.

== Bibliography ==
- Letters on Agriculture, 1844
- A Series of Letters on Agricultural Improvement, 1845
- On the Principles which ensure Success in Trade 1850; another edition 1856
- How to Farm Profitably, particularly on Stiff Heavy Clays 1857; several editions
- On the Sewerage of Towns as it affects British Agriculture, 1860
- Mr. Mechi's Farm Balance Sheets, also his Lectures and Papers on Farming, 1867
- Profitable Farming: Mr. Mechi's Latest Agricultural Sayings and Doings, with Balance Sheets, 1869
- Profitable Farming: Being the Second Series of the Sayings and Doings of J.J. Mechi, 1872
- How to Farm Profitably: Third Series, 1876
- Mr. Mechi's Statement to his Visitors on Agricultural Improvements, 1878.
  - Some of Mechi's statements were replied to in publications by W. W. Good in 1851 and 1852, and by R. Rolton in 1853
