= Wilkin & Sons =

English manufacturer of preserves and associated products

Coordinates: 51.8071°N 0.7544°E

Wilkin & Sons Ltd

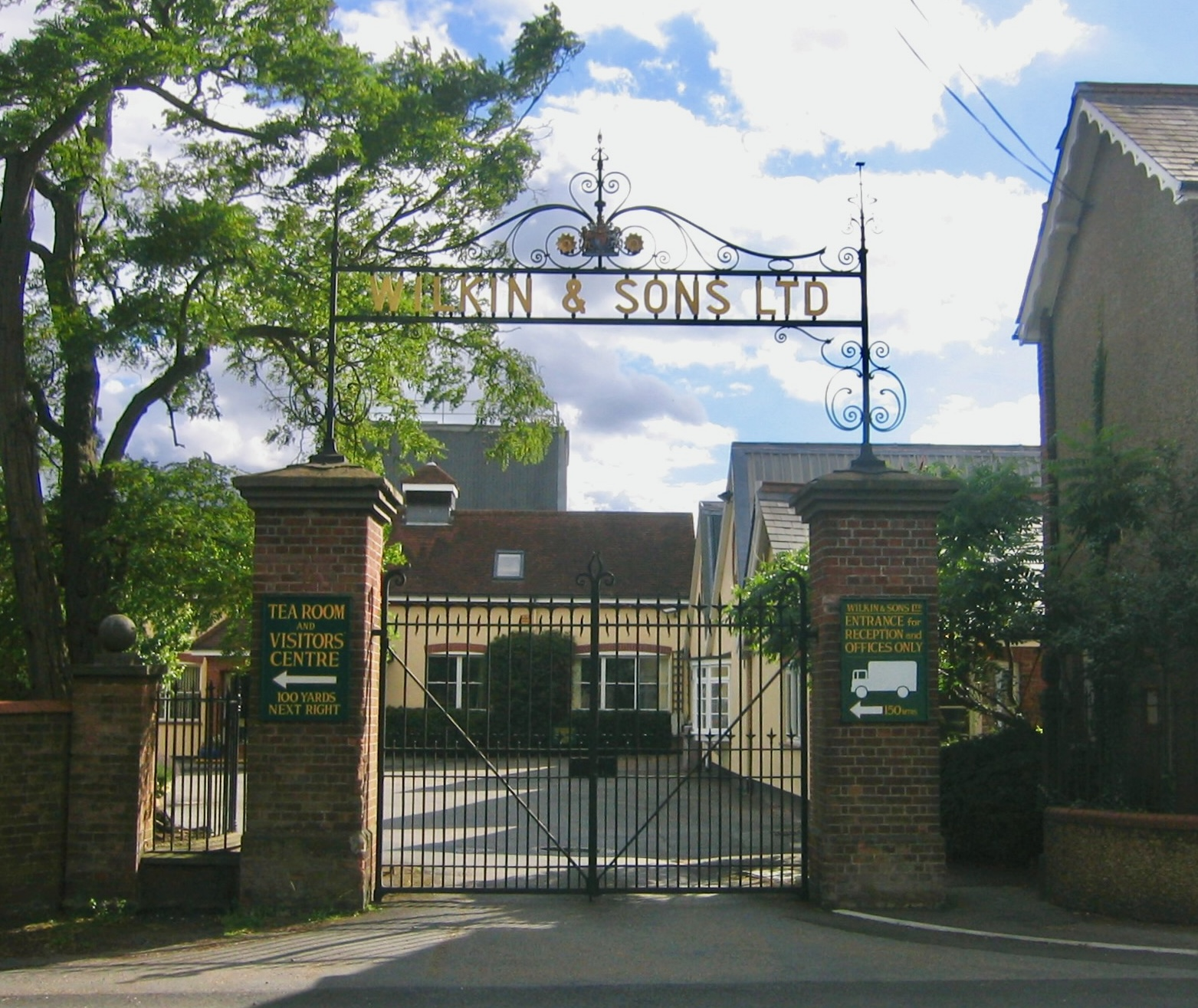
- Main factory entrance
- Type: Private
- Industry: Food manufacture
- Predecessor: Britannia Fruit Preserving Company
- Founded: 1885
- Founder: Arthur Charles Wilkin
- Headquarters: Tiptree, Essex, England
- Area served: Global
- Products: Preserves, Jams, Marmalades, Christmas Puddings, Honey, Sauces, Chutneys, Tea, Curds, Fruit Juices, Liqueurs, Spirits
- Brands: Tiptree
- Number of employees: 250
- Website: tiptree.com

Wilkin & Sons Limited is a manufacturer of preserves, marmalades and associated products established in Tiptree, Essex, England in 1885, and known for its "Tiptree" brand of fruit preserves.

== History ==
The Wilkin family came to Tiptree, Essex and started farming at Trewlands farm in the early 1700s. By 1865, the farm was beginning to move from arable crops to fruit, which were shipped to markets in London. There were around 850 people living in Tiptree by that time. From 1904 this was via the Kelvedon and Tollesbury Light Railway, with the company providing most of the freight traffic at Tiptree station until the line's closure in 1962.

After Prime Minister William Ewart Gladstone commended fruit preserving to the British population, Arthur Charles Wilkin founded the Britannia Fruit Preserving Company in 1885. This produced the first "Tiptree" branded preserves, with all production sold that year to a merchant who shipped it to Australia. 10 years later 400 seasonal pickers were annually harvesting 200 tons of fruit, of which half was turned into jam and preserves.

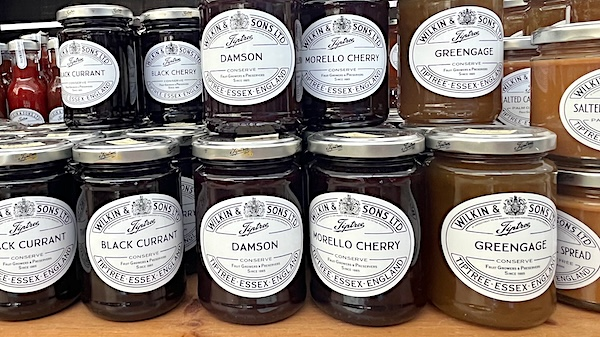
Pyramid of jars of Tiptree jam by Wilkin & Sons of various flavours

Reformed as Wilkin & Sons, the company leased farms as far away as Dagenham and Suffolk. By 1906, the company owned 800 acres (320 ha) of land on farms in Tiptree, Tollesbury and Goldhanger producing 300 tons of fruit per year, and feeding a factory capable at peak production of making 10 tons of strawberry jam per day. The company has held a Royal Warrant for preserves and marmalades continuously since 1911.

In 1914 the local newspaper reported “During Monday, over ten tons of strawberries including a large proportion of the famous ‘Little Scarlet’ were made into jam.”

With the need for a pound of sugar to a pound of fruit to produce 2 lb of preserves, production was halted during World War I due to a lack of essential supplies. But by 1922, and now owning 1,000 acres (400 ha) of farmland across eight farms, the company was creating new record outputs of fruit and preserves. An integrated production facility, the company also owned 100 houses, the village's windmill and blacksmith's forge, the Factory Club and the freehold of the Salvation Army hall.

During World War II, the company and factory came under the reins of the Ministry of Food, and kept producing its preserves alongside other essential food products.

In 2010, the company celebrated its 125th anniversary, with a visit from Queen Elizabeth II. The company commissioned a stage play to relate the life of John Joseph Mechi, silversmith, inventor and experimental farmer at Tiptree Hall. Writtle College was commissioned to create a "Tiptree" garden at the Chelsea Flower Show.

== Present ==
Peter Wilkin, the great-grandson of the founder, remains an integral part of the business. Through a trust, employees own almost half of the business.

The company farms 1,000 acres (400 ha) in and around Tiptree and grows much of its own fruit, including strawberries, plums, cherries, raspberries, mulberries, quinces, medlars and Little Scarlet, a small fruiting variety of strawberry with a unique and intense flavour. Turnover exceeded £34 million in 2012, and the business employs over 250 full-time staff with many more during the fruitpicking season.

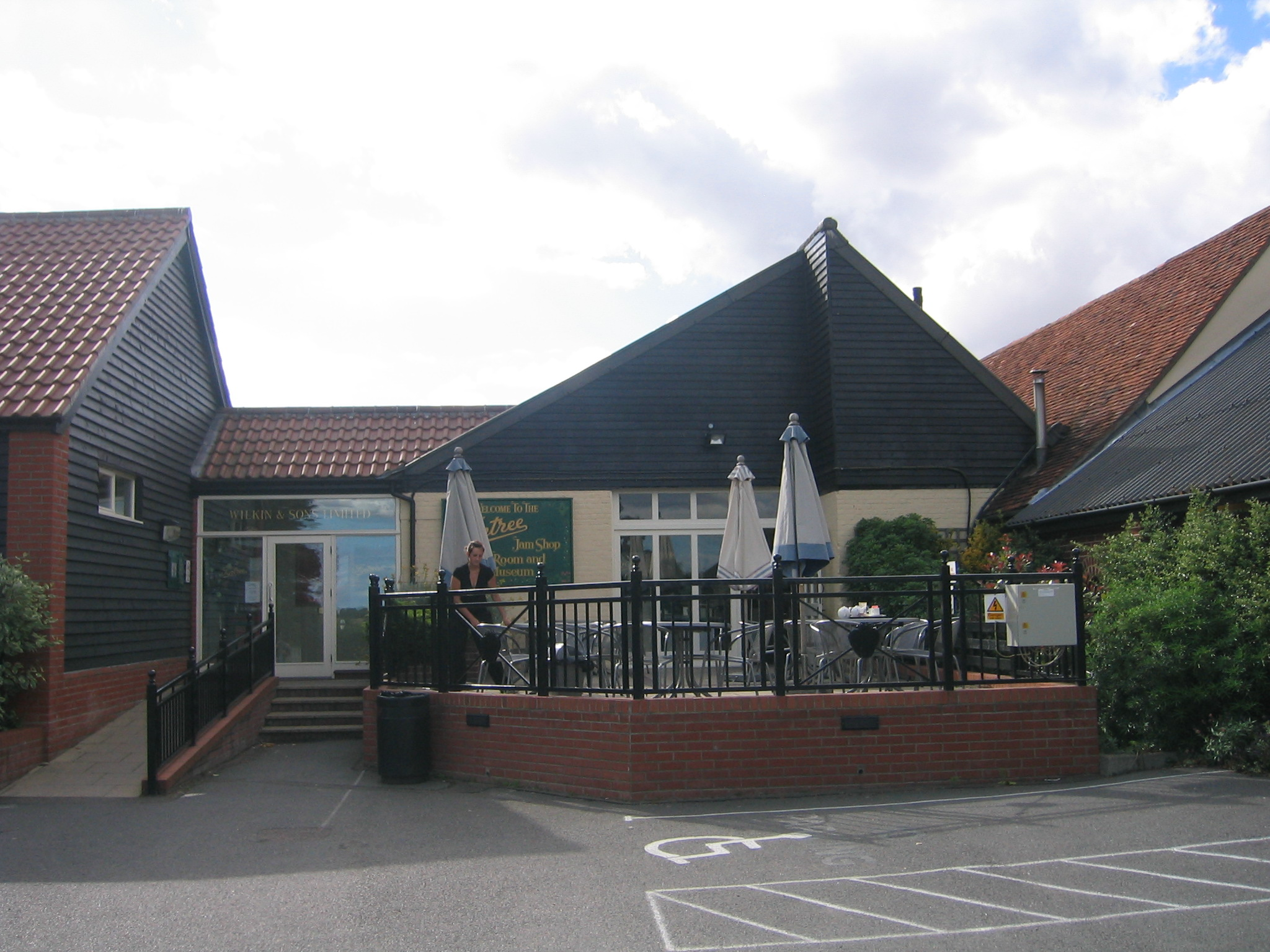
Wilkins' Tea Shop

Wilkin & Sons Limited operate a chain of tea rooms in Essex, a specialist bakery and patisserie producer (Tiptree Patisserie) and sells fresh fruit grown on the Tiptree estate. The Tiptree Visitor Centre features a tearoom, shop, and museum about the company's history, jam-making, and village life. The visitor centre and museum are located in the grounds of the jam factory.

=== Other brands ===
- Cole's Puddings Ltd: Christmas puddings and other products in a purpose-built facility in Great Chesterford, Essex
- Thursday Cottage: originally a Somerset producer of natural jams, preserves and marmalades.
