= Tiptree =

Village in Essex, England

Coordinates: 51.81°N 0.75°E

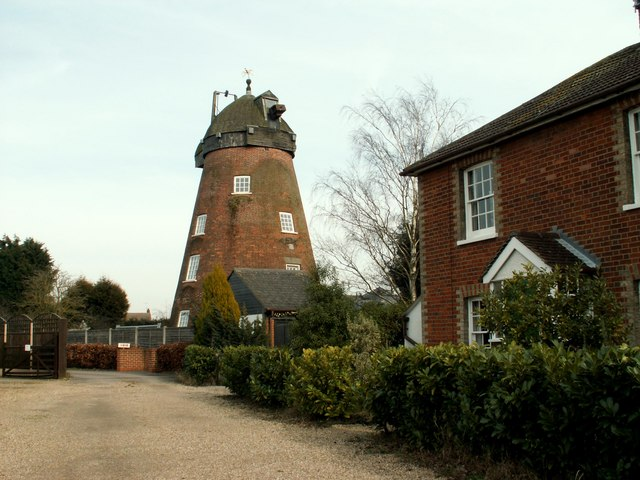
- Messing Maypole mill

- Location within Essex
- Population: 9,628 (Parish, 2021); 9,300 (Built up area, 2021)
- OS grid reference: TL895165
- Civil parish: Tiptree
- District: City of Colchester
- Shire county: Essex
- Region: East
- Country: England
- Sovereign state: United Kingdom
- Post town: COLCHESTER
- Postcode district: CO5
- Dialling code: 01621
- Police: Essex
- Fire: Essex
- Ambulance: East of England
- UK Parliament: Witham

Tiptree is a large village and civil parish in the City of Colchester district of Essex, England. It is situated 10 miles (16 km) south-west of Colchester and around 50 miles (80 km) north-east of London. Surrounding villages include Messing, Tolleshunt Knights, Tolleshunt Major, Layer Marney, Inworth, Birch, Great Braxted, Great Totham and Little Totham. At the 2021 census the parish had a population of 9,628 and the built up area had a population of 9,300.

== History ==
The area was recorded in the Domesday Book of 1086 as "woodland for swine" as part of the Great Forest of Essex, until the 1200s when King John ordered deforestation. An area of over 1,000 acres of wasteland became known as the land of heath and thief frequented by smugglers, vagabonds and thieves.

From records and maps the following were names for the area: Tipentrie, Typpetre, Tippetre, Typeltre, Typetre, Tiptre Heth, Tiptree Comon and heath. The name could mean "Tippa's tree", or may derive from the Prior of Tipper.

Messing Maypole Mill is a Grade II* listed tower mill located in the village.

Tiptree did not become a parish until 1934. The area which became part of Tiptree had previously been part of seven different parishes: Tolleshunt Knights, Tolleshunt D'Arcy, Great Wigborough, Great Braxted, Messing, Inworth, and Tollesbury.

Tiptree underwent significant expansion in the 1990s and 2000s, leading the village to be locally considered amongst the contenders for the title of 'largest village in England'. The 'village' status was the subject of a local referendum in 1999 but residents and secondary school pupils rejected town status.

At the 2021 census the population of the parish was 9,628. It had been 9,152 at the 2011 census.

Tiptree was the site of the Tiptree sneeze, an event that occurred on 22 February 2014 at a concert by the London Central Fellowship Band at St. Luke's Parish Church where a trombonist sneezed into his trombone while playing. A video of the event was posted to YouTube and went viral in 2014.

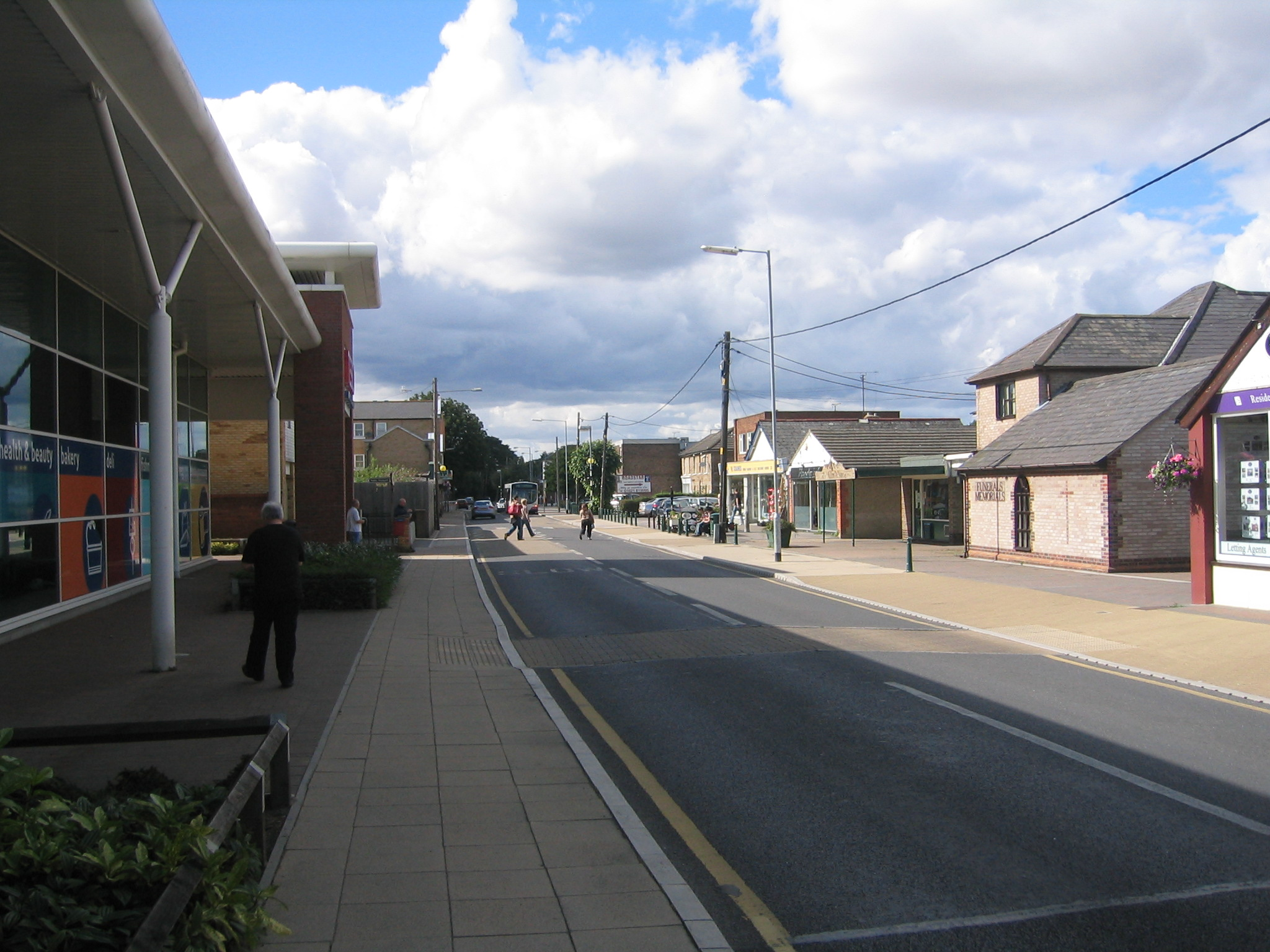
Church Road, Tiptree

== Nature reserves ==
Tiptree Heath lies to the south of Tiptree. The 25-hectare heath is the largest surviving fragment of heathland in Essex and is a Site of Special Scientific Interest. Historically the area was a focal point for smugglers, who used the secluded water inlets of Tollesbury, Salcott cum Virley and Mersea, and often hid their contraband within the overgrown heathland. Species found on the heath include Cross-leaved Heather (Erica tetralix), Bell Heather (Erica cinerea) and Ling or Common Heather (Calluna). To help maintain the heath, Dexter cattle are grazed there during the summer and a herd of hardy Exmoor ponies throughout the year. Tiptree Parish Field is a Local Nature Reserve.

== Governance ==
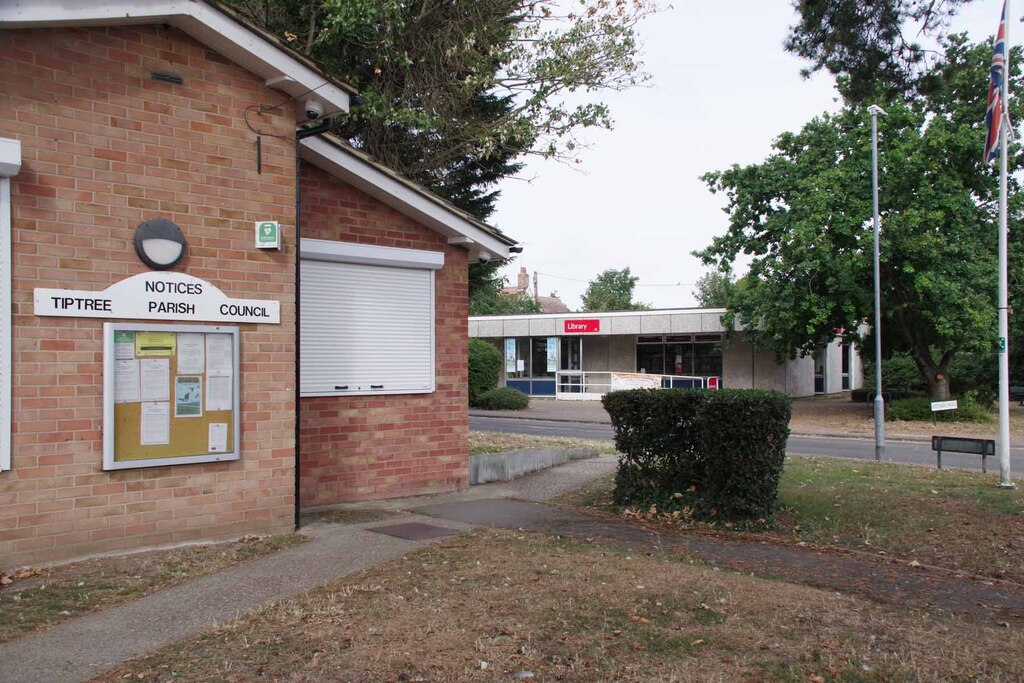
Parish Council office at 56 Church Road, with library in background

There are three tiers of local government covering Tiptree, at parish, district, and county level: Tiptree Parish Council, Colchester City Council and Essex County Council. The parish council is based at 56 Church Road.

For national elections, Tiptree forms part of the Witham constituency.

== Education ==
Tiptree has four primary schools: St Luke's Church of England Primary school, Milldene Primary School, Tiptree Heath Primary School and Baynard's Primary School. Thurstable School provides secondary and sixth form education.

== Economy ==
Tiptree is a brand of fruit preserves manufactured in the village by Wilkin & Sons. The business was founded by the Wilkins family, a local farmers, in 1885.

== Churches ==
Within the Church of England, the village is part of the United Benefice of Tolleshunt Knights with Tiptree and Great Braxted.

There are three other churches in the village, Kingsland Church, Tiptree United Reformed Church, and St John Houghton, a Roman Catholic church.

== Transport ==
From about 1904 until 1951 the village was served by the Kelvedon and Tollesbury Light Railway. It was an early victim of the mid-20th century cutbacks to the British Rail network and Tiptree railway station closed in 1951. Local councillors have called for the line to be reinstated, but there are no plans to do so as of 2026.

The nearest operational railway station is Kelvedon on the main Norwich to London Liverpool Street line. Today, the village is bisected by the B1022 Colchester to Maldon road, and the B1023 Kelvedon to Tollesbury road. Tiptree is also close to the main A12 trunk road which passes through Essex. Bus services link the village to surrounding towns.

== Notable residents ==
- John Joseph Mechi (1802–1880), silversmith, banker, inventor and Alderman of the City of London; owned, and died at, Tiptree Hall.
