= Priti Patel =

British politician (born 1972)

The Right Honourable Dame Priti Patel DBE MP
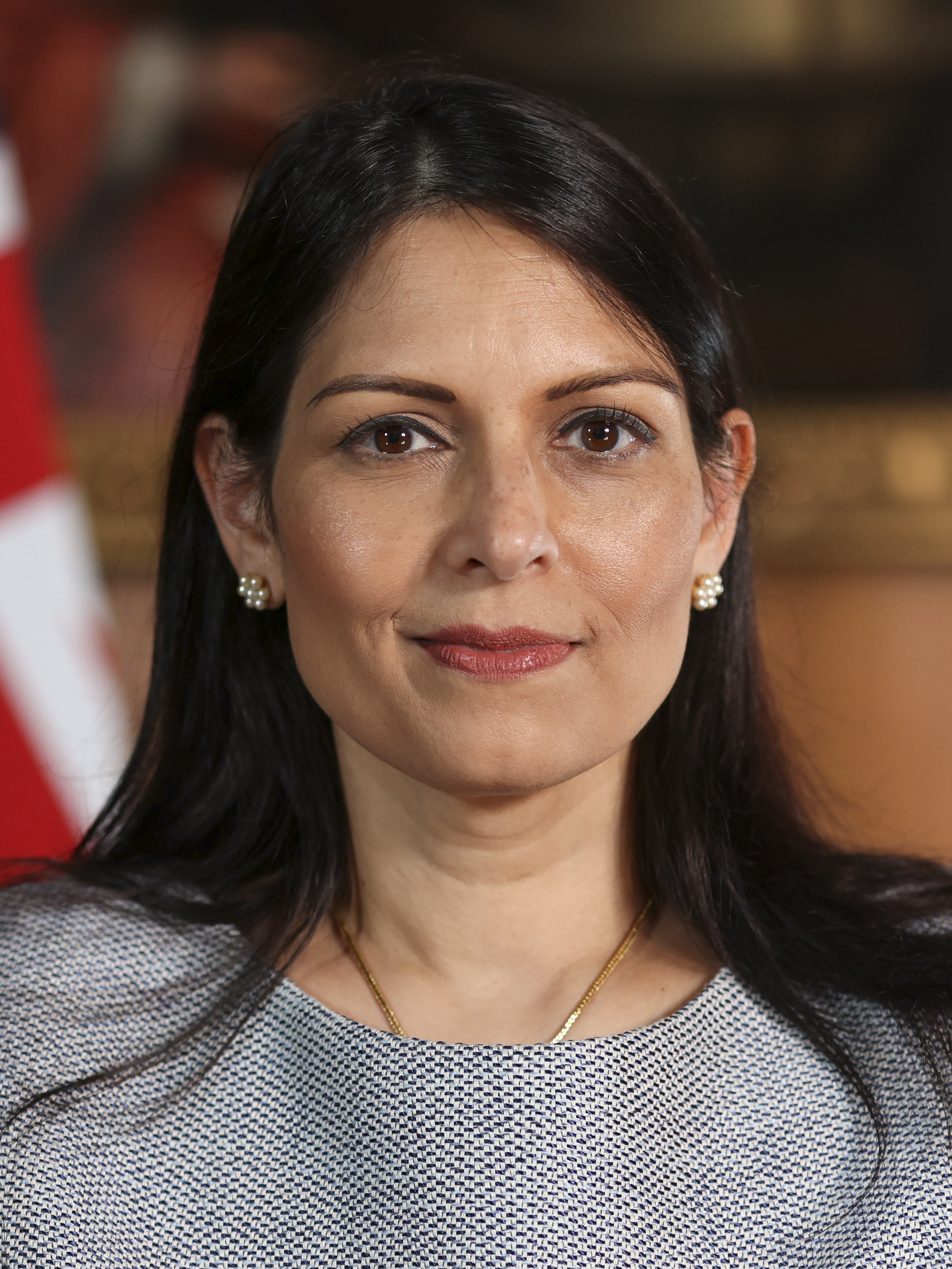
- Official portrait, 2021

Shadow Foreign Secretary
- In office 4 November 2024 – 31 August 2026
- Leader: Kemi Badenoch
- Preceded by: Andrew Mitchell
- Succeeded by: Tom Tugendhat

Home Secretary
- In office 24 July 2019 – 6 September 2022
- Prime Minister: Boris Johnson
- Preceded by: Sajid Javid
- Succeeded by: Suella Braverman

Secretary of State for International Development
- In office 14 July 2016 – 8 November 2017
- Prime Minister: Theresa May
- Preceded by: Justine Greening
- Succeeded by: Penny Mordaunt
Junior ministerial offices
Minister of State for Employment
In office 11 May 2015 – 14 July 2016
| Prime Minister | David Cameron |
| Preceded by | Esther McVey |
| Succeeded by | Damian Hinds |
Exchequer Secretary to the Treasury
In office 15 July 2014 – 11 May 2015
| Prime Minister | David Cameron |
| Preceded by | David Gauke |
| Succeeded by | Damian Hinds |

Member of Parliament for Witham
- Incumbent
- Assumed office 6 May 2010
- Preceded by: Constituency established
- Majority: 5,145 (10.2%)

Personal details
- Born: Priti Sushil Patel; 29 March 1972 (age 54) Harrow, London, England
- Party: Conservative (1991–1995; since 1997)
- Other political affiliations: Referendum (1995–1997)
- Spouse: Alex Sawyer (m. 2004)
- Children: 1
- Education: University of Keele (BA); University of Essex (MPP)
- Priti Patel's voice Patel explains the Rwanda asylum plan Recorded 14 April 2022

Dame Priti Sushil Patel (born 29 March 1972) is a British politician who has served as the Member of Parliament (MP) for Witham since 2010. She served as Home Secretary from 2019 to 2022. A member of the Conservative Party, she was also Secretary of State for International Development from 2016 to 2017 and Shadow Foreign Secretary from 2024 to 2026. She is ideologically on the right wing of the Conservative Party; she considers herself to be a Thatcherite and has attracted attention for her socially conservative stances.

Patel was born in London to a Ugandan-Indian family. She was educated at Keele University and the University of Essex. Inspired to get involved in politics by the Conservative Prime Minister Margaret Thatcher, Patel was involved with the Referendum Party before switching allegiance to the Conservatives. She worked for the public relations consultancy firm Weber Shandwick for several years before seeking a political career. After she unsuccessfully contested Nottingham North at the 2005 general election, the new Conservative leader David Cameron recommended Patel for the Party's "A-List" of prospective parliamentary candidates.

She was first elected MP for Witham, a new seat in Essex, at the 2010 general election. As a backbencher, Patel was Vice-Chair of the Conservative Friends of Israel and co-wrote a number of papers and books, including After the Coalition (2011) and Britannia Unchained (2012). Under the coalition government of Cameron, she served as Exchequer Secretary to the Treasury from 2014 to 2015. After the 2015 UK general election, Cameron promoted her to Minister of State for Employment, attending Cabinet.

A longstanding Eurosceptic, Patel was a leading figure in the Vote Leave campaign for Brexit during the 2016 referendum on UK membership of the European Union. Following Cameron's resignation, Patel supported Theresa May's bid to become Conservative leader; May subsequently appointed Patel Secretary of State for International Development. In 2017, Patel was involved in a political scandal involving unauthorised meetings with the Government of Israel which breached the Ministerial Code, causing May to request Patel's resignation as International Development Secretary.

Under Boris Johnson's premiership, Patel became Home Secretary in July 2019. In this role, she launched a points-based immigration system, an asylum deal with Rwanda to address the English Channel migrant crossings, advocated the passage of the Police, Crime, Sentencing and Courts Act 2022, and approved the extradition of Julian Assange to the United States. She was also found to have breached the Ministerial Code in relation to incidents of bullying. Following the resignation of Johnson and subsequent election of Liz Truss as Prime Minister, Patel resigned as Home Secretary on 6 September 2022. After the Conservative Party's loss at the 2024 general election, Patel stood in the 2024 Conservative Party leadership election, but was eliminated in the first MP ballot. Upon Kemi Badenoch's victory in the leadership election, Patel was appointed Shadow Foreign Secretary, a position which she retained until she stepped down in order to take up a new role as International Secretary of the Conservative Party and was succeeded by Tom Tugendhat in August 2026.

== Early life ==
Priti Sushil Patel was born on 29 March 1972 in Harrow, London, to Sushil and Anjana Patel; her paternal grandparents were born in Gujarat, India, before emigrating to Uganda, and running a convenience store in Kampala. In the 1960s, her parents emigrated to the UK and settled in Hertfordshire. They established a chain of newsagents throughout London and the South East of England. She was raised in a Hindu household. Her father Sushil was a UKIP candidate for Bushey South seat within Hertsmere District at the 2013 Hertfordshire County Council election.

Patel attended a comprehensive school in Watford before studying Economics at Keele University. She then pursued postgraduate studies in British Government and Politics at the University of Essex. The former Conservative leader and Prime Minister Margaret Thatcher became her political heroine: according to Patel, she "had a unique ability to understand what made people tick, households tick and businesses tick. Managing the economy, balancing the books and making decisions—not purchasing things the country couldn't afford". She joined the Conservative Party in 1991, when John Major was Prime Minister.

== Early career ==
After graduating, Patel became an intern at Conservative Central Office (now known as Conservative Campaign Headquarters), having been selected by Andrew Lansley (then Head of the Conservative Research Department). From 1995 to 1997, Patel headed the press office of the Referendum Party.

In 1997, Patel rejoined the Conservative Party having been offered a post to work for the new leader William Hague in his press office, dealing with media relations in London and the South East of England. In August 2003, the Financial Times (FT) published an article citing quotes from Patel and alleging that "racist attitudes" persisted in the Conservative Party, and that "there's a lot of bigotry around". Patel wrote to the FT countering its article, stating that her comments had been misinterpreted to imply that she had been blocked as a party candidate because of her ethnicity.

== Lobbying and corporate relations ==
In 2000, Patel left her job with the Conservative Party to work for Weber Shandwick, a PR consulting firm. According to an investigative article published by The Guardian in May 2015, Patel was one of seven Weber Shandwick employees who worked on British American Tobacco (BAT), a major account. The team had been tasked with helping BAT manage the company's public image during the controversy around its Burmese factory being used as source of funds by its military dictatorship and poor payment to factory workers. The crisis eventually ended with BAT pulling out of Myanmar in 2003. The article went on to quote BAT employees who felt that though a majority of Weber Shandwick employees were uncomfortable working with them, Patel's group was fairly relaxed. The article also quoted internal documents specifying that a part of Patel's job was also to lobby MEPs against EU tobacco regulations. She worked for Weber Shandwick for three years.

Patel then moved to the British multinational alcoholic beverages company, Diageo, and worked in corporate relations between 2003 and 2007. In 2007, she rejoined Weber Shandwick as Director of Corporate and Public Affairs practices. According to their press release, during her time at Diageo, Patel had "worked on international public policy issues related to the wider impact of alcohol in society."

== Parliamentary career ==
=== Member of Parliament for Witham: 2010–present ===
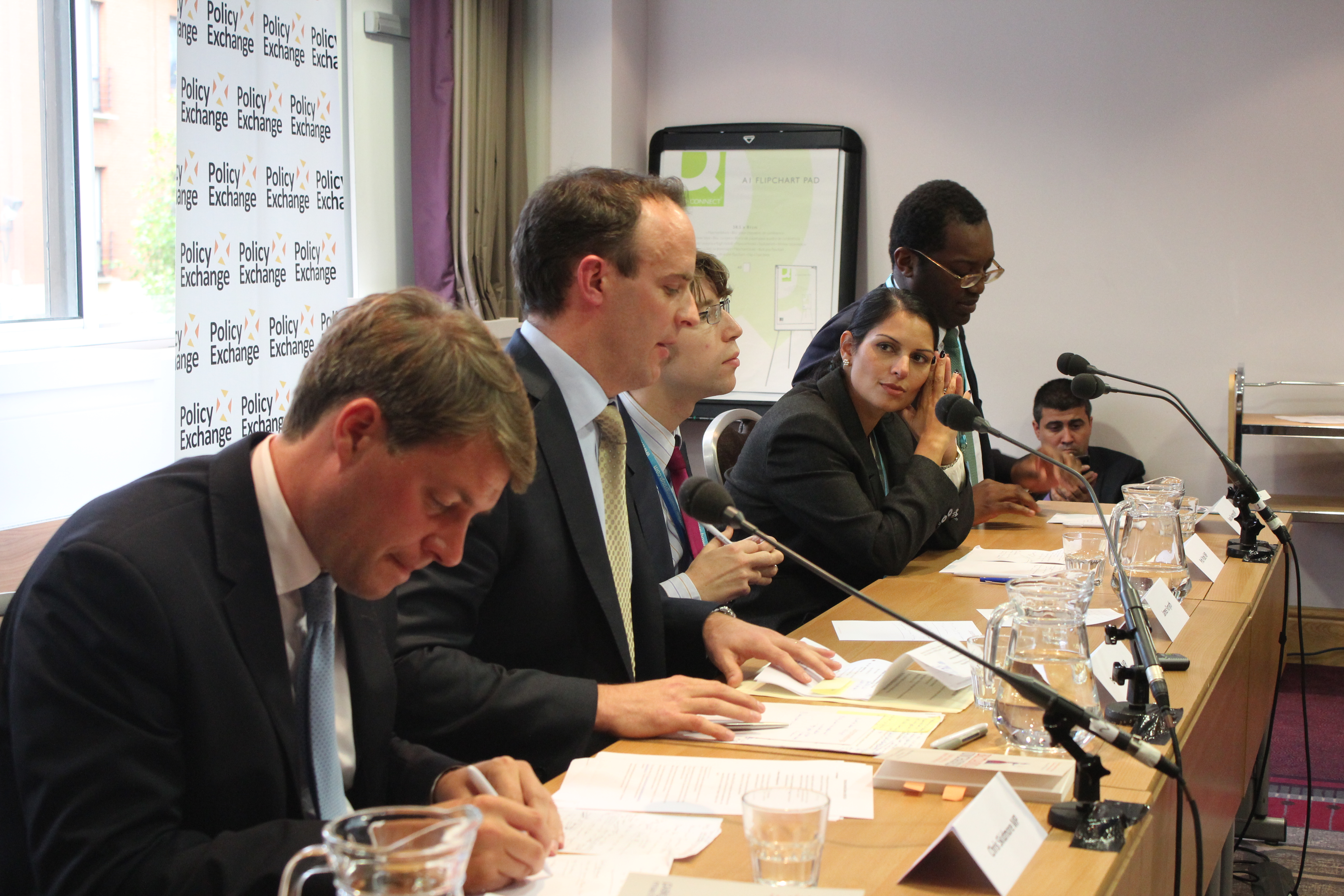
Patel on the panel of Britannia Unchained

In the 2005 UK general election, Patel stood as the Conservative candidate for Nottingham North, losing to the incumbent Labour MP Graham Allen. Patel finished in second place and won 18.7% of the vote. After her unsuccessful election campaign, she was identified as a promising candidate by new party leader David Cameron, and was offered a place on the "A-List" of Conservative Prospective Parliamentary Candidates (PPC). In November 2006, Patel was adopted as the PPC for the notionally safe Conservative seat of Witham, which was a new constituency in central Essex created after a boundary review. At the 2010 general election, Patel was elected to Parliament as MP for Witham, winning 52.2% of the vote and a majority of 15,196.

Along with fellow Conservative MPs Kwasi Kwarteng, Dominic Raab, Chris Skidmore and Liz Truss, Patel was considered one of the "Class of 2010" who represented the party's "new Right". Together, they co-authored Britannia Unchained, a book published in 2012. The book was critical of levels of workplace productivity in the UK, making the controversial statement that "once they enter the workplace, the British are among the worst idlers in the world". The authors suggested that to change this situation, the UK should reduce the size of the welfare state and seek to emulate the working conditions in countries like Singapore, Hong Kong and South Korea rather than those of other European nations. In the same year, Patel was elected to the executive of the 1922 Committee.

In October 2013, Patel was drafted into the Number 10 Policy Unit, and was promoted as Exchequer Secretary to the Treasury the following summer. In October 2014, Patel criticised the plan of the Academies Enterprise Trust to merge the New Rickstones and Maltings Academies, claiming that to do so would be detrimental to school standards. Patel lodged a complaint with the BBC alleging one-sided coverage critical of Narendra Modi on the eve of his victory in 2014 Indian elections. In January 2015, Patel was presented with a "Jewels of Gujarat" award in Ahmedabad, India, and in the city she delivered a keynote speech to the Gujarat Chamber of Commerce.

At the 2015 UK general election, Patel was re-elected with an increased vote share of 57.5% and an increased majority of 19,554. During the campaign, she had criticised Labour Party rival John Clarke for referring to her as a "sexy Bond villain" and a "village idiot" on social media; Clarke apologised. After the election, Patel became Minister of State for Employment in the Department for Work and Pensions, and was sworn on to the Privy Council.

In October 2015, a junior employee at the Department for Work and Pensions was dismissed from her role. In response, the employee brought a formal complaint of bullying and harassment against the DWP, including Patel. In 2017, a settlement was reached for £25,000 after the member of staff threatened to bring a legal claim of bullying, harassment and discrimination on the grounds of race and disability against the department and Patel.

In December 2015, Patel voted in support of Cameron's planned bombing of Islamic State targets in Syria.

=== Brexit campaign: 2015–2016 ===
Following Cameron's announcement of a referendum on the UK's continuing membership of the European Union (EU), Patel was touted as a likely "poster girl" for the Vote Leave campaign. Patel said that the EU is "undemocratic and interferes too much in our daily lives". She publicly stated that immigration from elsewhere in the EU was overstretching the resources of UK schools. She helped to launch the Women for Britain campaign for anti-EU women; at their launch party, she compared their campaign with that of Emmeline Pankhurst and the Suffragettes, for which she was criticised by Emmeline's great-granddaughter Helen Pankhurst.

Following the success of the "Leave" vote in the EU referendum, Cameron resigned, resulting in a Conservative Party leadership contest. Patel openly supported Theresa May as his successor, stating that she had the "strength and experience" for the job, while arguing that May's main challenger Andrea Leadsom would prove too divisive to win a general election. In November 2017, Patel was critical of the UK Government Brexit negotiations and stated: "I would have told the EU in particular to sod off with their excessive financial demands."

=== Secretary of State for International Development: 2016–2017 ===
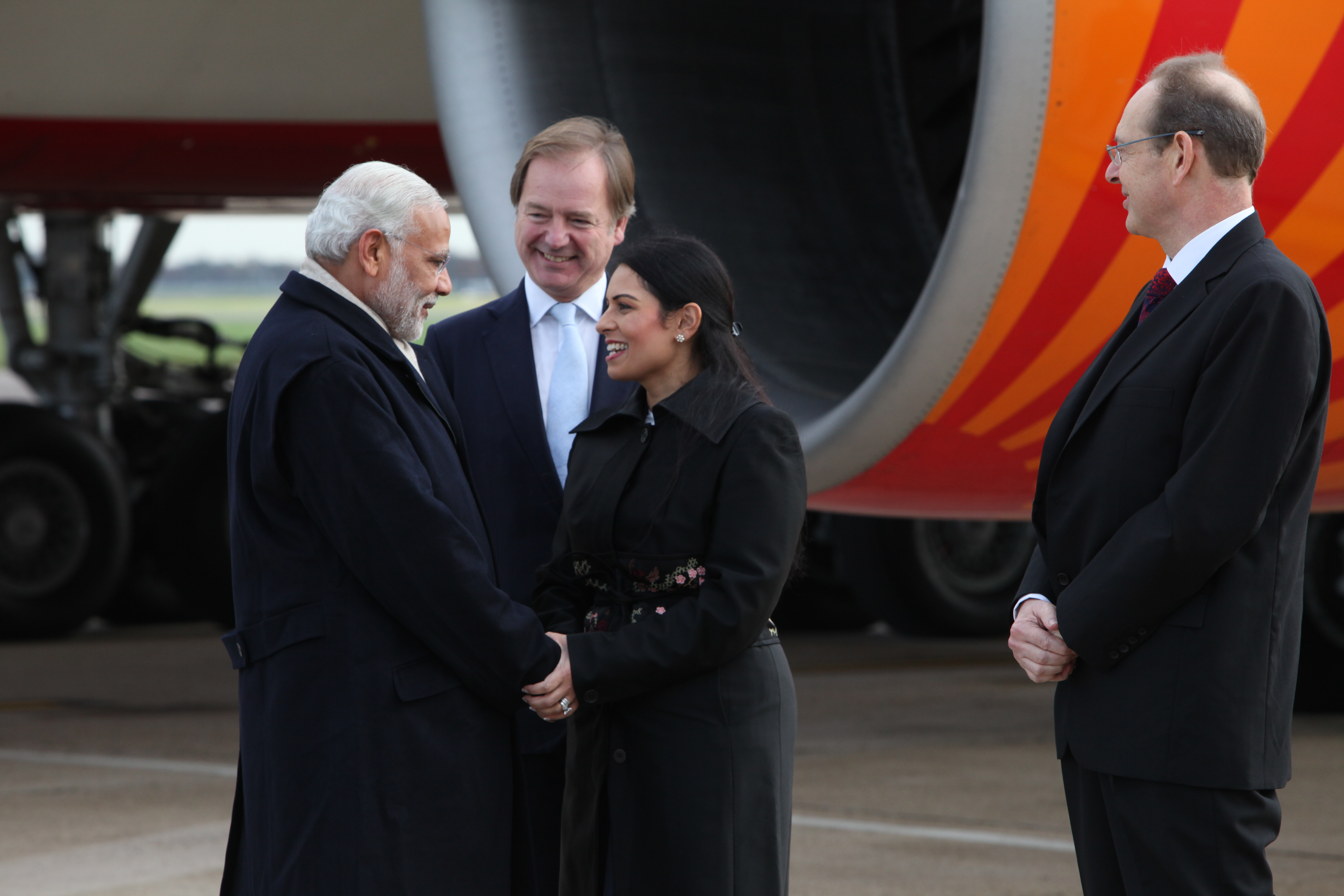
Patel greeting Indian Prime Minister Narendra Modi at Heathrow Airport on 12 November 2015

After becoming Prime Minister in July 2016, May appointed Patel to the post of Secretary of State for International Development. According to the New Statesman, some staff at the department were concerned about Patel's appointment, because of her support for Brexit and her longstanding scepticism regarding International Development and Aid spending.

On taking the position, Patel stated that too much UK aid was wasted or spent inappropriately, declaring that she would adopt an approach rooted in "core Conservative principles" and emphasise international development through trade as opposed to aid. In September, Patel announced that the UK would contribute £1.1 billion to a global aid fund used to combat malaria, tuberculosis and HIV/AIDS, and added that any further aid deals would include "performance agreements" meaning that the British Government could reduce aid by 10% if specific criteria were not met by the recipient country.

In September 2016, she expressed opposition to the construction of 28 affordable homes at the Lakelands development in Stanway, referring to it as an "unacceptable loss of open space" and criticising Colchester Borough Council for granting permission. That same month, the Council's Chief Executive Adrian Pritchard issued a complaint against Patel, claiming that she had acted "inappropriately" in urging Sajid Javid to approve the construction of an out-of-town retail park after it had already been rejected by Colchester Council.

Patel was critical of the UK's decision to invest DFID funds to support the Palestinian territories through UN agencies and the Palestinian Authority. In October 2016, she ordered a review of the funding procedure, temporarily freezing approximately a third of Britain's aid to the Palestinians during the review. In December 2016, DFID announced significant changes concerning future funding for the Palestinian Authority. DFID stated that future aid would go "solely to vital health and education services, in order to meet the immediate needs of the Palestinian people and maximise value for money". This move was widely supported by Jewish groups, including the Jewish Leadership Council and the Zionist Federation.

In January 2017, Patel and the Labour MEP Neena Gill were the two UK winners of the Pravasi Bharatiya Samman, the highest honour that the Indian Government bestows upon non-resident Indians or people of Indian origin. She was given the award for her public service. At the 2017 UK general election, Patel was again re-elected with an increased vote share of 64.3% and a decreased majority of 18,646 votes. In March 2020, it was reported that while serving as International Development Secretary Patel was alleged to have "harassed and belittled" staff in her private office in 2017.

==== Meetings with Israeli officials and resignation ====
On 3 November 2017, it was revealed that Patel had held meetings in Israel in August 2017 without telling the Foreign Office. She was accompanied by Lord Polak, Honorary President of Conservative Friends of Israel (CFI). The meetings, up to a dozen in number, took place while Patel was on a "private holiday". Patel met Yair Lapid, the leader of Israel's centrist Yesh Atid party, and reportedly made visits to several organisations where official departmental business was discussed. The BBC reported that "According to one source, at least one of the meetings was held at the suggestion of the Israeli Ambassador to London. In contrast, British diplomats in Israel were not informed about Ms Patel's plans." It was also reported that, following the meetings, Patel had recommended that the Department for International Development give international aid money to field hospitals run by the Israeli army in the Golan Heights. On 4 November 2017, in an interview with The Guardian, Patel stated:

Boris [Johnson] knew about the visit. The point is that the Foreign Office did know about this, Boris knew about [the trip]. I went out there, I paid for it. And there is nothing else to this. It is quite extraordinary. It is for the Foreign Office to go away and explain themselves. The stuff that is out there is it, as far as I am concerned. I went on holiday and met with people and organisations. As far as I am concerned, the Foreign Office have known about this. It is not about who else I met; I have friends out there.

Patel faced calls to resign, with numerous political figures calling her actions a breach of the ministerial code, which states: "Ministers must ensure that no conflict arises, or could reasonably be perceived to arise, between their public duties and their private interests, financial or otherwise". On 6 November, Patel was summoned to meet May, who then said that Patel had been "reminded of her responsibilities" and announced plans for the ministerial code of conduct to be tightened. Patel released an apology for her actions, and corrected her remarks to The Guardian, which she said gave the false impression that the Foreign Secretary knew about the trip before it happened, and that the only meetings she had had were those then in the public domain. According to Downing Street, May learned of the meetings when the BBC broke the story on 3 November.

In the days after Patel's meeting with the Prime Minister and public apology, there were further revelations about her contacts with Israel, including details of two more undisclosed meetings with Israeli officials in Westminster and New York in September 2017, that Patel had not disclosed when she met the Prime Minister on 6th. As a result of these further revelations, Patel was summoned to Downing Street once more on 8 November, where she met with the Prime Minister and subsequently resigned from her Cabinet position, after 16 months in the post. She was replaced by Penny Mordaunt the following day. Patel said that, following her resignation, she was "overwhelmed with support from colleagues across the political divide" and from her constituents.

=== Backbencher: 2017–2019 ===
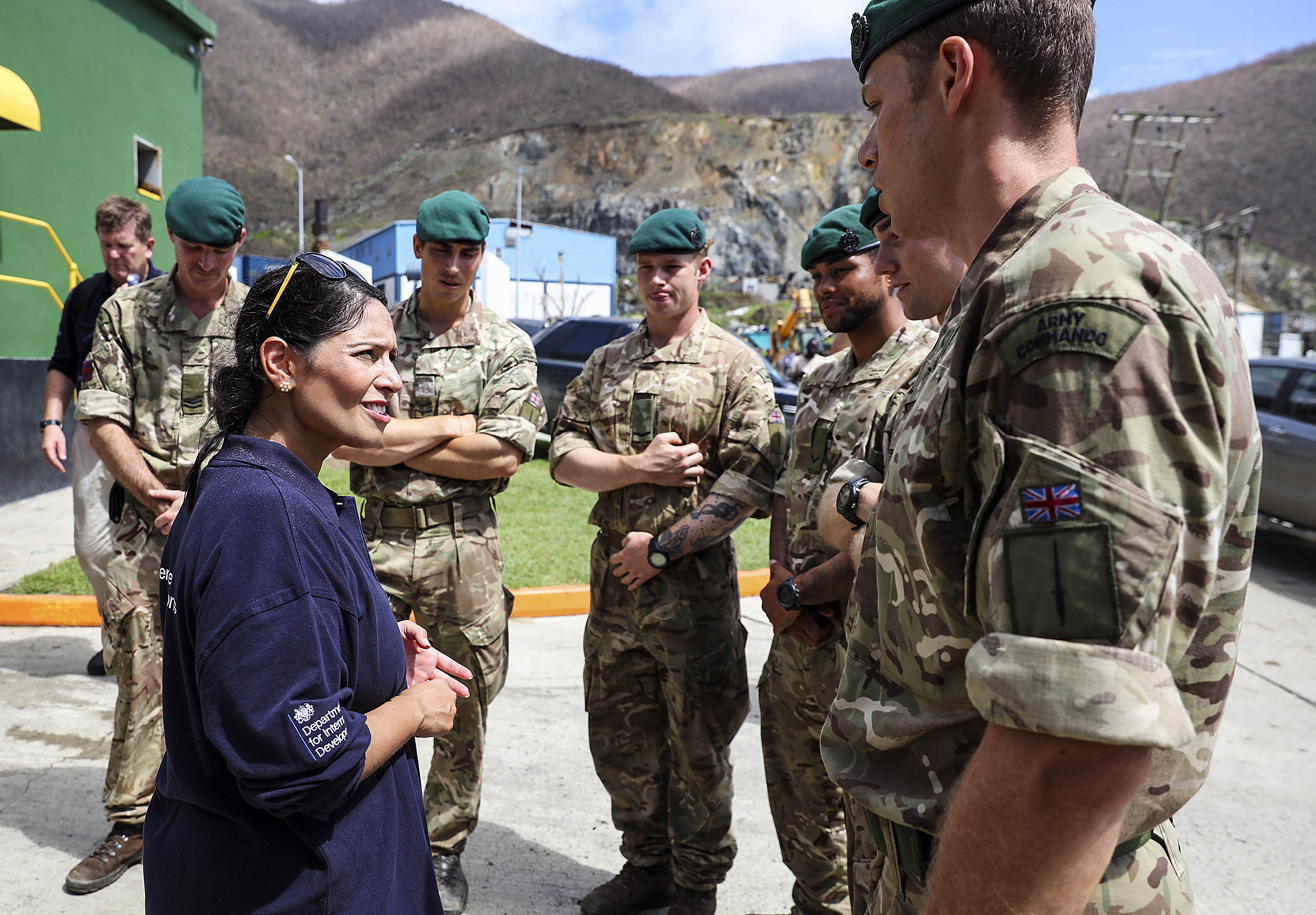
Patel visiting British troops in 2017

In May 2018, Patel questioned the impartiality of the Electoral Commission and called for it to investigate Britain Stronger in Europe or to end its inquiry into the Vote Leave campaign. Patel expressed concern that Britain Stronger in Europe had been provided with services by other remain campaigns without declaring the expenditure in the appropriate way. In August 2018, the Electoral Commission reported that there was no evidence that Britain Stronger in Europe had breached any laws on campaign spending.

In December 2018, during the UK's Brexit negotiations, a government report was leaked which indicated that food supplies and the economy in the Republic of Ireland could be adversely affected in the event of a no-deal Brexit. Following the report, Patel commented: "This paper appears to show the government were well aware Ireland will face significant issues in a no-deal scenario. Why hasn't this point been pressed home during negotiations?" Some sections of the media reported her comments as a suggestion that Britain should exploit Ireland's fear of damage to its economy and food shortages to advance its position with the EU. She was criticised for insensitivity by several other MPs in the light of Britain's part in Ireland's Great Famine in the 19th century, in which a million people died. Patel stated her comments had been taken out of context. Journalist Eilis O'Hanlon criticised the media's characterisation of Patel's comments as a "manipulative, sinister media-manufactured campaign of character assassination", further elaborating that the "divide between fact and comment broke down entirely in response to Priti Patel's comments".

In March 2019, Patel backed a pamphlet published by the TaxPayers' Alliance which called for the International Development budget to be reformed, and for the UK alone to decide what constitutes aid, rather than international organisations.

=== Home Secretary: 2019–2022 ===
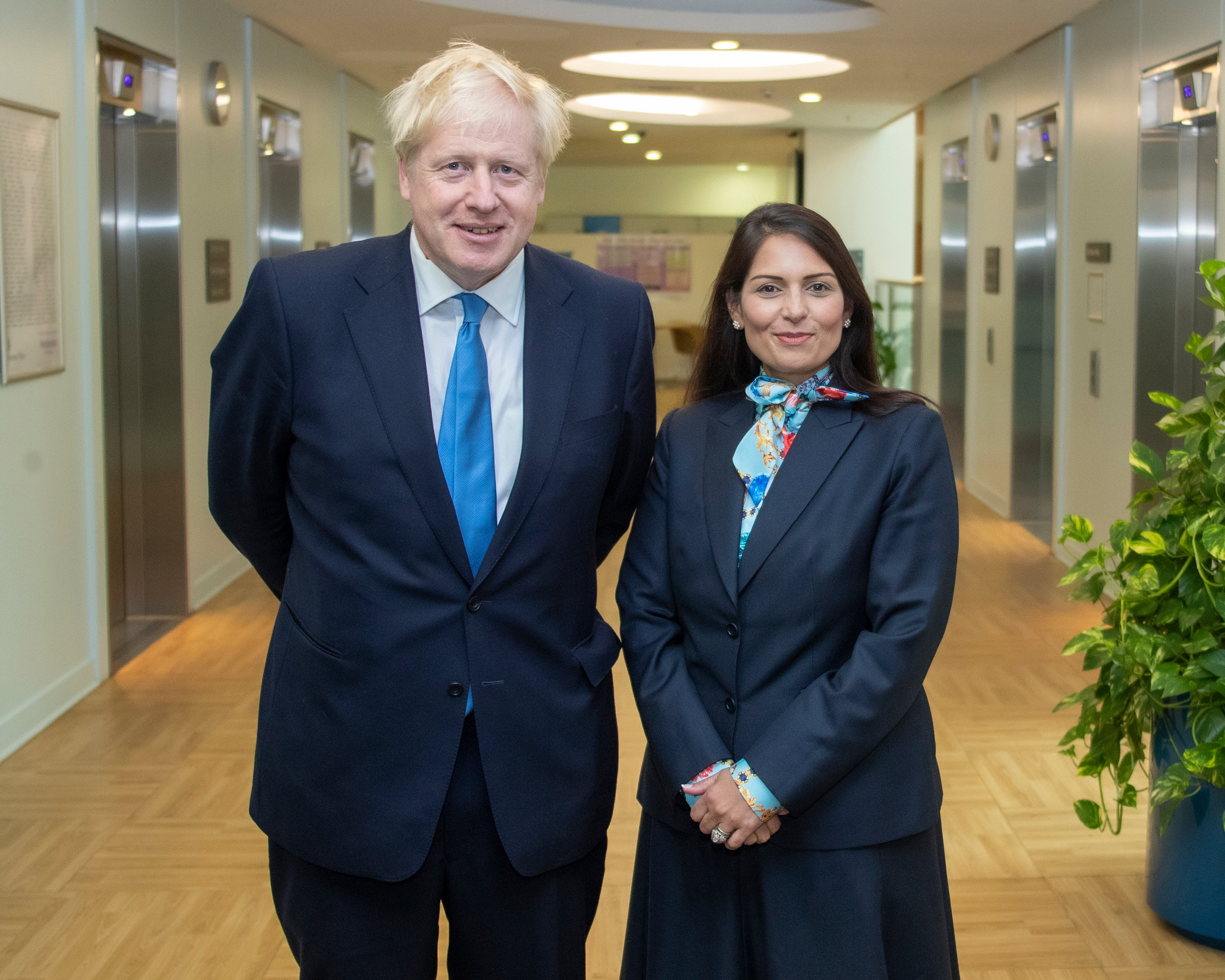
Patel as Home Secretary with Johnson in 2019

Patel was appointed Home Secretary by Johnson in July 2019. Shortly after her appointment, news transpired that, in May 2019, Patel began working for Viasat as a strategic adviser on a salary of £5,000 a month for five hours' work a month, without seeking prior approval from the Government's Advisory Committee on Business Appointments, leading to accusations that she had broken the ministerial code for a second time. At the 2019 UK general election, Patel was again re-elected with an increased vote share of 66.6% and an increased majority of 24,082 votes.

==== Police and crime ====
In January 2020, a report by the Youth Empowerment and Innovation Project said that Patel's approach to tackling youth radicalisation was "madness" and the Home Office had been "disengaged". After the murder of Sir David Amess, Patel asked all police forces in the United Kingdom to review security arrangements for Members of Parliament.

==== Immigration ====
In February 2020, Patel launched a points-based immigration system, which took effect from 1 January 2021. It replaced the EU freedom of movement and liberalised non-EU immigration by lowering the skill threshold from degree level to A-level equivalent, expanding eligible occupations, reducing the general salary threshold, removing the cap on skilled worker visas, reintroducing the post-study work visa and scrapping the resident labour market test.

In Parliament on 13 July 2020, Patel said the system "will enable us to attract the brightest and best – a firmer and fairer system that will take back control of our borders, crack down on foreign criminals and unleash our country's true potential. We are building a brighter future for Britain and signalling to the world that we are open for business".

The new system was associated with a substantial rise in non-EU immigration. Net migration reached 764,000 in 2022 and peaked at 944,000 in the year ending March 2023, with total immigration standing at 1,469,000 in the same period.

On 1 October 2021, Patel banned the use of EU Identity Cards as a travel document for entering the UK, stating that almost half of all false documents detected at the UK border the previous year were ID cards. In February 2022, Patel also scrapped the tier 1 investor visa for wealthy people outside of the EU who invest in the UK, in what was called the start of a "renewed crackdown on illicit finance and fraud".

As Home Secretary, Patel has actively sought to sign a number of returns agreements with countries to make it easier to remove foreign nationals who have no right to be in the UK to their country of origin. Such agreements were signed with Albania in July 2021 and Serbia in January 2022.

===== Asylum seekers =====
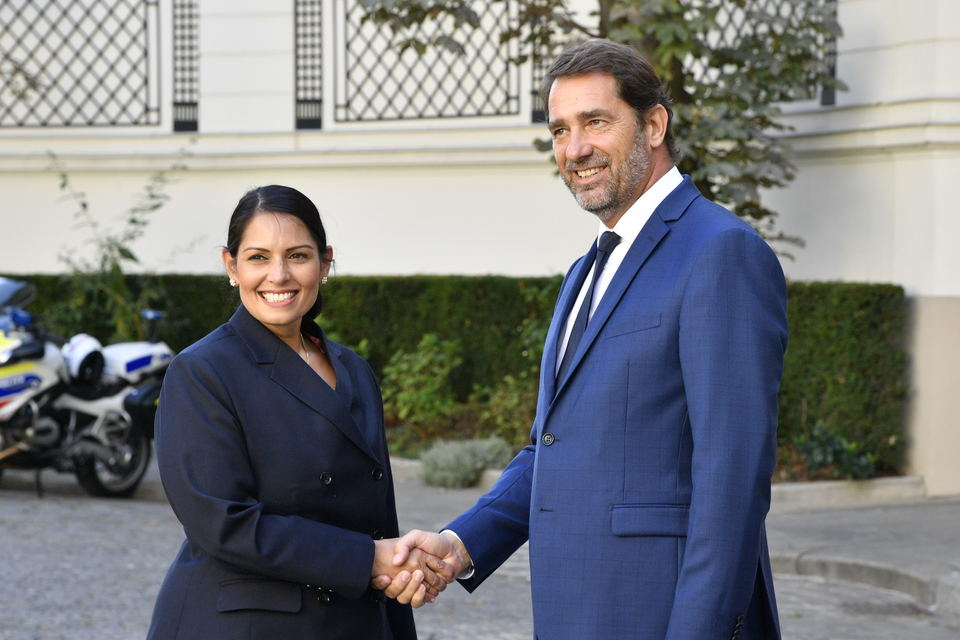
Patel meets with the French Interior Minister Christophe Castaner in 2019 to discuss the English Channel migrant crossings

In August 2020, Patel suggested that many migrants were seeking to cross the English Channel to Britain because they believed that France was a "racist country" where they may be "tortured". Patel said she did not share those views, but it was a reason why many migrants were crossing the Channel. Patel has vowed to make the Channel "unviable" for migrant boats.

In September 2020, Patel suggested that Ascension Island, which is more than 4,000 miles (6,400 km) from the UK, could be used to build an asylum processing centre. Nick Thomas-Symonds, then–Shadow Home Secretary, said: "This ludicrous idea is inhumane, completely impractical and wildly expensive – so it seems entirely plausible this Tory Government came up with it."

In March 2021, Patel published a New Plan for Immigration Policy Statement, which included proposals to reform the immigration system, including the possibility of offshore processing of undocumented immigrants. In April 2021, 192 refugee, human rights, legal and faith groups signed a letter which condemned a six-week consultation, organised by the Home Office, on these proposals. Signatories of the letter described the consultation as "vague, unworkable, cruel and potentially unlawful".

In May 2021, a High Court judge criticised Patel in court and said he found it "extremely troubling" that one of her officials admitted the Home Office may have acted unlawfully in changing its asylum accommodation policy during the COVID-19 pandemic in the UK. Following the judge's comments, a solicitor representing Patel apologised on her behalf. In June 2021, a High Court judge ruled that the Home Office acted unlawfully by housing asylum seekers in an "unsafe" and "squalid" former army barracks. The judge found that the Home Office failed to look after vulnerable people and noted that a lack of safety measures had contributed to a "significant" risk of injury and death from fires or from COVID-19.

In November 2021, following the November 2021 English Channel disaster, the French Government withdrew an invitation to Patel to attend a meeting about the Channel boats crisis, after Johnson called on France to take back people who crossed the Channel to the UK in small boats. In March 2022, French Interior Minister Gerald Darmanin said many Ukrainian refugees had been turned away by British officials in Calais and told to obtain visas at UK consulates in Paris or Brussels.

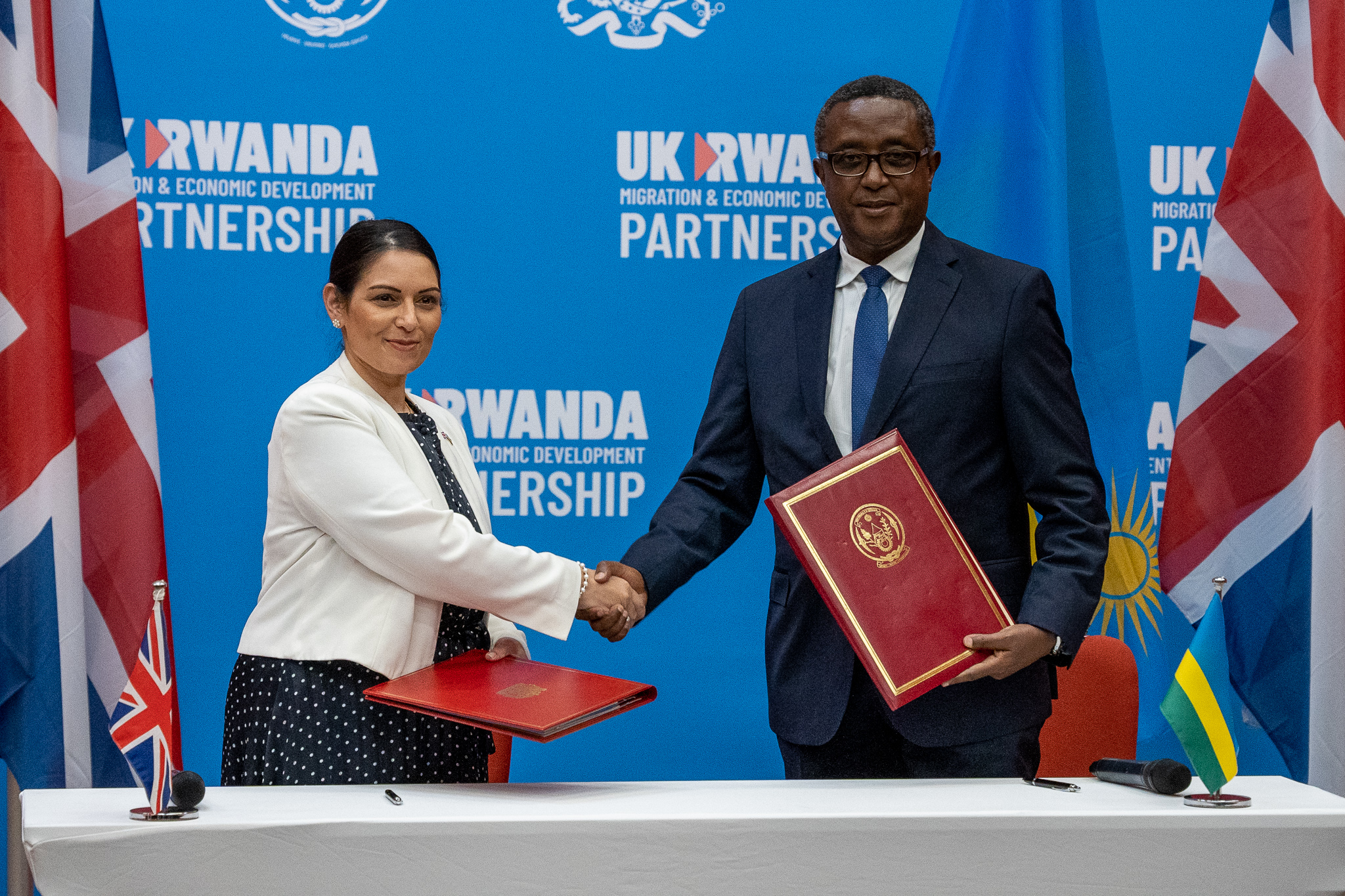
Patel meets with Rwandan Foreign Minister Vincent Biruta in 2022 to sign the Rwanda asylum plan

In April 2022, Patel visited the Rwandan capital of Kigali and signed the Rwanda asylum plan, to fly thousands of migrants who cross the English Channel in lorries or on boats more than 4,000 miles on chartered planes to the African country. The plan has been criticised by many charities, as well as Opposition politicians.

===== Review of Border Force =====
In February 2022, Patel commissioned Alex Downer, a former Minister for Foreign Affairs in Australia's Liberal Party, to conduct an independent review of Border Force. Downer's appointment was criticised by Border Force's trade unions because of his support for Australia's widely criticised immigration policies.

In July 2022, Downer published his review and concluded that Border Force's overall approach was "ineffective and possibly counterproductive". The report found that while Border Force was "largely delivering what is required of it on a day-to-day basis" overall the organisation was performing at "a suboptimal level". Patel welcomed the report's recommendations. Yvette Cooper, the Shadow Home Secretary, described the review as "incredibly damning" and accused Patel of failing "to get any grip of Britain's borders".

==== Evidence of bullying and breach of ministerial code ====
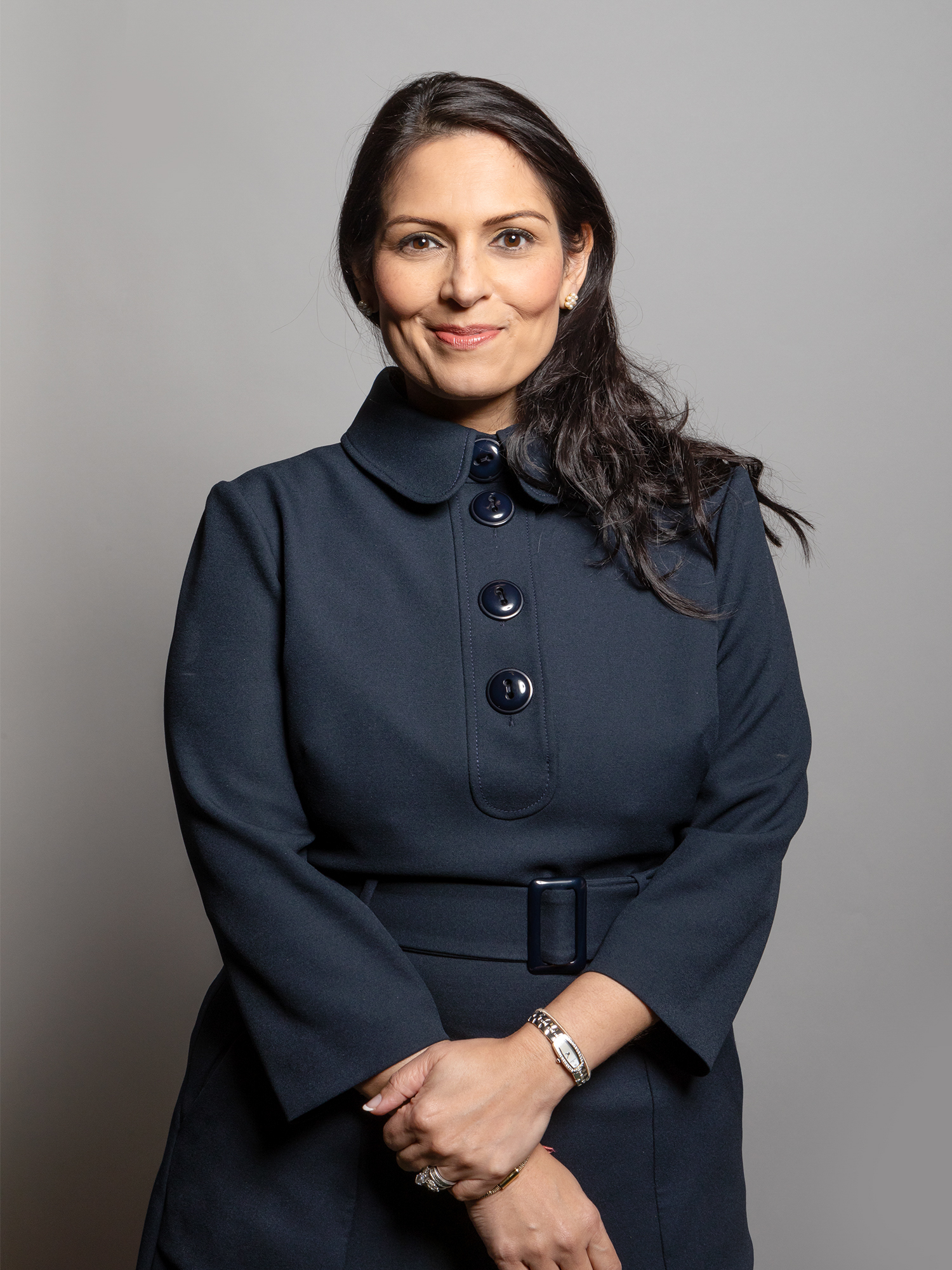
Official MP portrait, 2020

In February 2020, Patel came under scrutiny for trying to "force out" Sir Philip Rutnam, the most senior civil servant in her department. Rutnam resigned on 29 February, saying he would sue the Government for constructive dismissal, and that he did not believe Patel's assertion that she had been uninvolved in an alleged campaign briefing against him. Rutnam alleged that Patel had orchestrated a "vicious" campaign against him. Several days later, Patel sent an email to Home Office staff in which she expressed regret at Sir Philip's decision to resign and thanked him for his service. In April 2020, Rutnam announced that he would be making a claim of "protected disclosure" under whistleblowing laws. A ten-day employment tribunal hearing was scheduled for September 2021, at which it was expected Patel would be called to appear.

In November 2020, a Cabinet Office inquiry found evidence that Patel had breached the ministerial code following allegations of bullying in the three Government Departments in which she had served. It was reported that Patel "had not met the requirements of the ministerial code to treat civil servants with consideration and respect". On 20 November 2020, Alex Allan announced that he had resigned as the Prime Minister's chief advisor on the ministerial code after Johnson rejected the findings of the inquiry and stated that he had "full confidence" in Patel. The FDA union argued that Johnson's response has "undermined" disciplinary procedures. Patel said that she had "never set out to upset anyone" and that she was "absolutely sorry for anyone that I have upset".

Commenting on the allegations of bullying The Guardian published a cartoon depicting her as a cow with a ring in its nose. This was alleged by some to be a Hinduphobic, racist and misogynistic reference to her Hindu faith, since cows are considered sacred in Hinduism. In February 2021, the FDA applied for a judicial review of Johnson's decision to support Patel. The union's General Secretary, Dave Penman, told the High Court that "civil servants should expect to work with ministers without fear of being bullied or harassed". Penman argued that if Johnson's decision was not "corrected" by the court, "his interpretation of the Ministerial Code will result in that document failing to protect workplace standards across government". The case was heard in November 2021 and the application for judicial review was rejected in a decision published in December 2021. In March 2021, HMG and Rutnam reached a settlement. Rutnam received payment of £340,000 with a further £30,000 in costs. This arrangement meant that Patel would no longer be called to give evidence before a public tribunal, which was due to be held in September 2021. Following the settlement, a Home Office spokesman said that liability had not been accepted.

==== Protests and cultural issues ====
In June 2020, Patel urged the public not to partake in the UK protests brought about by the murder of George Floyd in the United States, due to the Coronavirus outbreak. She criticised Black Lives Matter demonstrators in Bristol for toppling the statue of Edward Colston, calling it "utterly disgraceful". In February 2021, she described the Black Lives Matter protests that occurred in the UK in 2020 as "dreadful" and said she did not agree with the gesture of taking the knee.

In June 2021, Patel criticised the England national football team for kneeling against racism before their Euro 2020 games, describing it as "gesture politics". She further said that spectators had the "choice" to boo the players for doing so. In July 2021, after England lost the final match, Patel condemned the racist abuse of England players on social media as "vile" and called for police action. England player Tyrone Mings criticised Patel as having "stoke[d] the fire" with her earlier comment, and then said that she was "pretend[ing] to be disgusted when the very thing [the national team was] campaigning against happens."

In September 2020, in a speech at the annual conference of the Police Superintendents' Association, Patel described Extinction Rebellion protesters as "so-called eco-crusaders turned criminals" and said Extinction Rebellion was an "emerging threat" who were "attempting to thwart the media's right to publish without fear nor favour" and that the protests were a "shameful attack on our way of life, our economy and the livelihoods of the hard-working majority". She also called for a police crackdown, saying she "refuses point blank to allow that kind of anarchy on our streets" and "the very criminals who disrupt our free society must be stopped".

==== Comments on the legal profession ====
On 3 September 2020, Patel tweeted that the removal of migrants from the United Kingdom was being "frustrated by activist lawyers". In response the Bar Council accused Patel of using "divisive and deceptive language" and the Liberal Democrats said the comments had "a corrosive effect on the rule of law". Her tweet came a week after the Home Office was forced by Permanent Secretary Matthew Rycroft to remove a video posted on its Twitter feed using similar terminology. Both the Bar Council and Law Society raised concerns about Patel's rhetoric with the Lord Chancellor Robert Buckland and Attorney-General Suella Braverman, who asked that she desist with her targeting of the legal profession. The intervention followed an alleged far-right terror attack at a solicitors' office, which took place four days after Patel's tweet and which was allegedly linked to her comments.

The Metropolitan Police Counter Terrorism Command advised the Home Office of the suspected terror attack in mid September. In October 2020, in a speech about the UK asylum system, Patel lambasted those she termed "do-gooders" and "lefty lawyers" for "defending the indefensible". Her comments were again met with criticism from both inside and outside of the legal profession.

==== Relations with Bahrain ====
As Home Secretary, Patel was keen to improve ties with the Gulf state Bahrain. In December 2020, she visited the kingdom to participate in the Manama Dialogue, where she met her counterpart and a number of senior Bahraini Government ministers. She also toured one of Bahrain's police departments, Muharraq Governorate Police, where several human rights activists have faced torture and sexual abuse by the authorities. The UK Home Office had granted asylum to a Bahraini democracy activist, Yusuf al Jamri, who was tortured and threatened with rape at the same police station. Patel was extensively condemned for her visit by human rights groups and the mistreated prisoners of Bahrain.

In May 2021, she was accused of viewing "activists as a security threat" by the director of advocacy at BIRD, Sayed Ahmed Alwadaei, who was facing challenges in the UK to get his daughter's citizenship application approved. Around the same time, on 25 May, Patel hosted a meeting with Bahrain's Interior Minister Rashid bin Abdullah Al Khalifa, who was allegedly responsible for the persecution of the human rights defenders and journalists. The meeting came a month after reports around "violent repression" by the Bahraini authorities of more than 60 political prisoners at Jau Prison. UK MPs condemned the meeting, calling it "incredibly insulting to the victims of these abuses". Andrew Gwynne also sent an open letter signed by multiple cross-party MPs to Johnson and called for the authorities to impose Magnitsky Act Sanctions on Rashid bin Abdullah Al Khalifa.

==== One-off incidents ====
===== COVID-19 contracts =====
In May 2021, Patel was accused of lobbying Michael Gove, the Cabinet Office minister, on behalf of Pharmaceuticals Direct Ltd (PDL), a healthcare firm, that sought a government contract to provide personal protective equipment. PDL's director, Samir Jassal, previously worked as an adviser to Patel and stood as a Conservative candidate at two general elections. PDL was later awarded a £102.7 million contract in July 2020. The Labour Party accused Patel of a "flagrant breach" of the ministerial code, and urged the Cabinet Secretary to investigate Patel's behaviour.

===== Prank victim =====
On 15 March 2022, Patel was the victim of a prank video call by Russian comedians Vovan and Lexus, who were accused by Britain of working for the Russian authorities. One of the callers impersonated Ukrainian Prime Minister Denys Shmyhal, and asked Patel if she was ready to accept neo-Nazi Ukrainian nationalists into the country, referring to the claim by the Russian Government that its invasion of Ukraine was to "denazify" the country. Patel's comments were picked up by Russian state media, including RIA Novosti, which interpreted her comments as meaning she was "ready to accept and help Ukrainian nationalists and neo-Nazis in every possible way".

=== Return to the backbenches ===
On 5 September 2022, in anticipation of the appointment of Liz Truss as Prime Minister, Patel tendered her resignation as Home Secretary effective from 6 September. She subsequently returned to the backbenches. Patel endorsed Boris Johnson in the October 2022 Conservative Party leadership election. After Johnson declined to stand, she instead endorsed Rishi Sunak.

Patel was one of ten parliamentarians personally named in a Commons Select Committee of Privileges special report on the "Co-ordinated campaign of interference in the work of the Privileges Committee", published 28 June 2023. The report detailed how said parliamentarians "took it upon themselves to undermine procedures of the House of Commons" by putting pressure on the Commons Privileges Committee investigation into Boris Johnson.

=== In opposition (2024-) ===
In the general election on 4 July 2024, Priti Patel was returned as MP for Witham despite the Conservatives suffering a landslide defeat across the country. She received 18,827 votes – a majority of 5,145 over her nearest rival, the Labour candidate Rumi Choudhury.

==== Leadership election (2024) ====
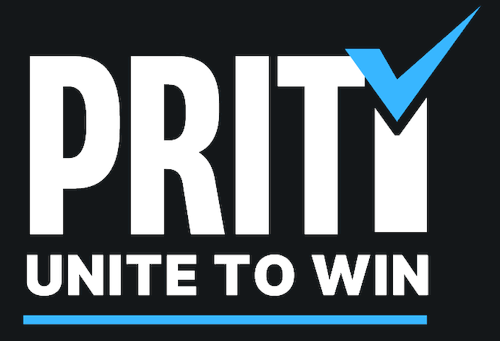
Logo of Patel's 2024 leadership campaign

Following the resignation of Rishi Sunak as Conservative Party leader, The Telegraph reported on 16 July 2024 that Patel would be a candidate in the subsequent leadership election after being “urged to run” by fellow MPs. Her allies believed she would be able to unify the different wings of the party. Patel announced she would run for Tory leader on 27 July 2024. On 9 September 2024 after a vote by Tory MPs, Priti Patel was eliminated from the leadership election gaining 14 out of 121 votes

==== Shadow Foreign Secretary ====
On 4 November 2024, Patel was appointed Shadow Foreign Secretary by newly-appointed Opposition Leader Kemi Badenoch.

In August 2026, Patel announced on social media that she was leaving her role as Shadow Foreign Secretary, and would take on a new international role working with "fellow conservatives and centre right parties around the world", but would remain an MP. Former Conservative leadership candidate Tom Tugendhat was reported as her replacement in the shadow cabinet.

Her departure from the shadow cabinet came during a planned 2026 British shadow cabinet reshuffle by Conservative leader Kemi Badenoch.

== Political ideology and views ==
Patel is considered to be on the right wing of the Conservative Party, with the Total Politics website stating that some saw her as a "modern-day Norman Tebbit". In The Guardian, economics commentator Aditya Chakrabortty characterised her as "an out-and-out right-winger" with no desire to "claim the centre ground" in politics. Patel has cited Margaret Thatcher as her political hero, and has described herself as a "massive Thatcherite", with various news sources also characterising her as such; while profiling Patel for The Independent, Tom Peck wrote that she "could scarcely be more of a Thatcherite". She previously served as a Vice-Chair of Conservative Friends of Israel.

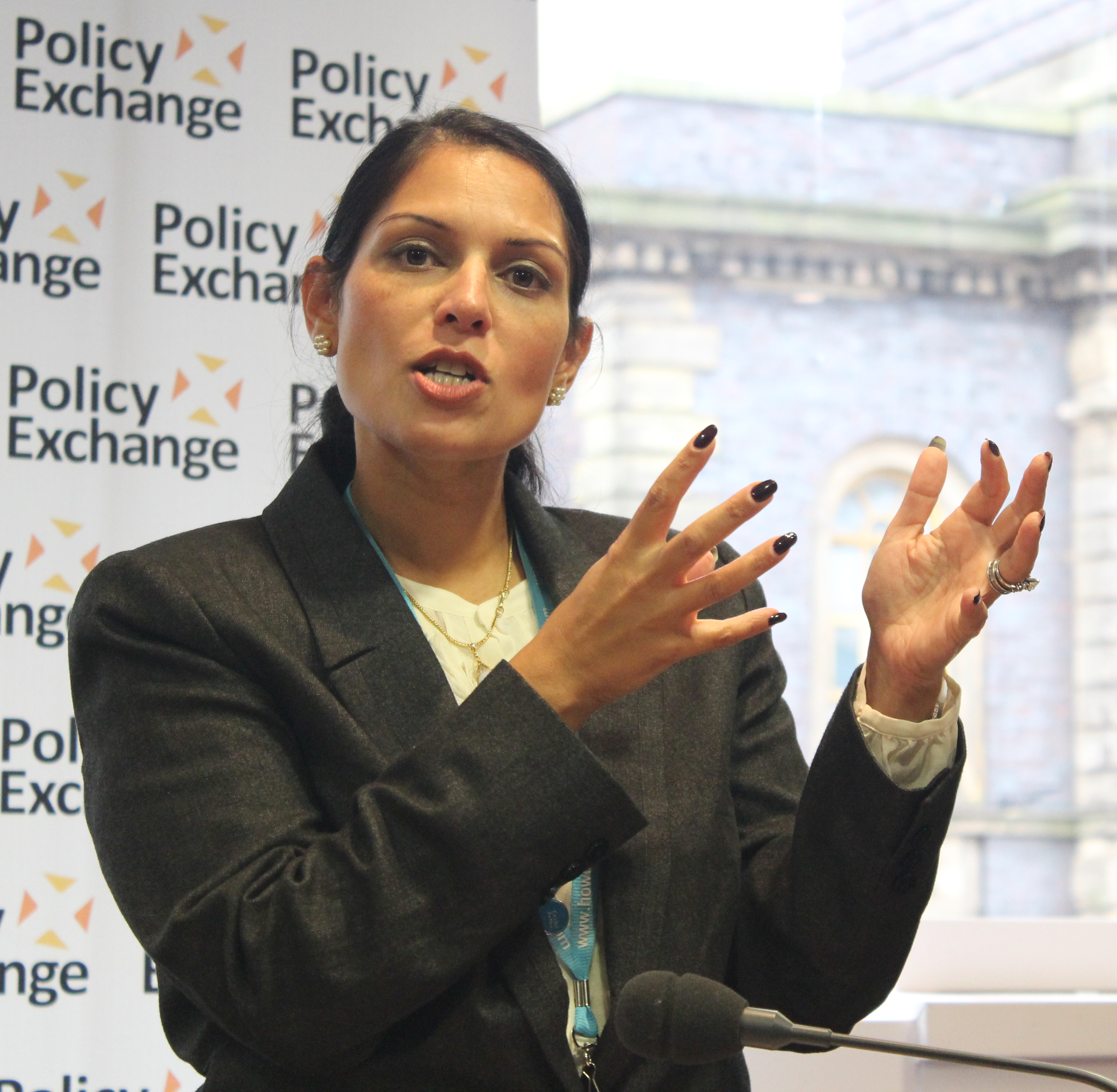
Patel speaking in 2012

Patel has taken robust stances on crime, attracting media attention when she argued for restoration of capital punishment on the BBC's Question Time in September 2011, although in 2016 she stated that she no longer held this view. Patel opposes prisoner voting, and has also opposed allowing Jeremy Bamber, who was convicted of murder in her constituency, access to media to protest his innocence. Patel voted against the Marriage (Same Sex Couples) Bill in 2013, which led to the introduction of same-sex marriage in England and Wales.

Patel has been criticised for raising issues in the House of Commons related to her time working with the tobacco industry. In October 2010, she voted for the smoking ban to be overturned; and led the Conservative campaign against plain tobacco packaging. Patel has also campaigned with the drinks industry, holding a reception in the Palace of Westminster for the Call Time On Duty Campaign in favour of ending the alcohol duty supertax (known as the escalator), a tax opposed by the Wine and Spirit Trade Association, the Scotch Whisky Association and the TaxPayers' Alliance.

Speaking on BBC Radio Kent in March 2018, Patel said that she found the commonly-used abbreviation BME (for Black and Minority Ethnic) to be "patronising and insulting". She said that she considered herself British "first and foremost" as she was born in the UK.

== Personal life ==
Patel has been married to Alex Sawyer since 2004. Sawyer is a marketing consultant for the stock exchange NASDAQ. He also serves as a Conservative councillor and Cabinet Member for Communities on the London Borough Council of Bexley. Sawyer also worked part-time as her office manager from February 2014 to August 2017. Together, they have a son, who was born in August 2008.

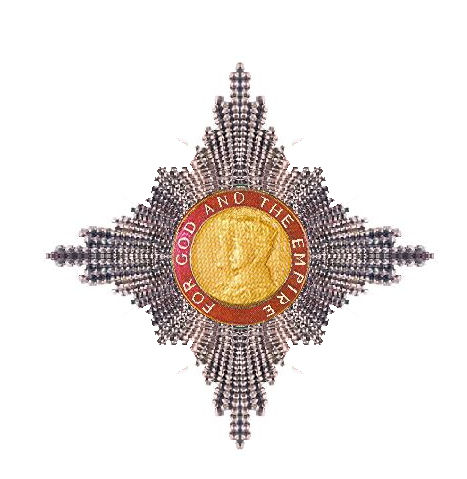
DBE breast star

== Honours ==
Patel was sworn of the Privy Council on 13 May 2015, according her the honorific prefix "the Right Honourable" for life.

In the 2022 Prime Minister's Resignation Honours, published on 9 June 2023, she was appointed Dame Commander of the Order of the British Empire (DBE). enabling her to wear the DBE neck decoration on occasions such as Remembrance Sunday and the breast star at formal dinners when welcoming overseas dignitaries.

Dame Priti is also a member of MCC, having been elected in 2020.

Parliament of the United Kingdom
| New constituency | Member of Parliament for Witham; 2010–present | Incumbent |
Political offices
| Preceded by David Gauke | Exchequer Secretary to the Treasury; 2014–2015 | Succeeded by Damian Hinds |
| Preceded by Esther McVey | Minister of State for Employment; 2015–2016 | Succeeded by Damian Hinds |
| Preceded by Justine Greening | Secretary of State for International Development; 2016–2017 | Succeeded by Penny Mordaunt |
| Preceded by Sajid Javid | Home Secretary; 2019–2022 | Succeeded by Suella Braverman |
| Preceded by Andrew Mitchell | Shadow Foreign Secretary; 2024–2026 | Succeeded by Tom Tugendhat |
