= Tiptree Heath =

Nature reserve in Essex, England

Coordinates: 51.798372°N 0.72793427°E

- Site of Special Scientific Interest
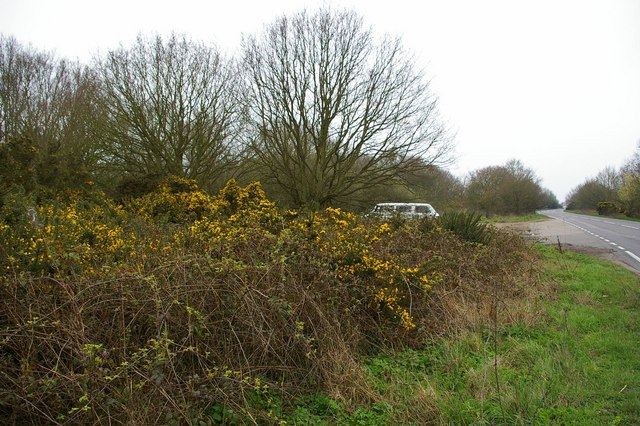
- Location of Tiptree Heath.
- Area of search: Essex
- Grid reference: TL 882146
- Interest: Biological
- Area: 25.0 ha (62 acres)
- Notification date: 1984
- Location map: Magic Map

Tiptree Heath is a 25 hectare biological Site of Special Scientific Interest south-west of Tiptree in Essex, England. It is managed by the Essex Wildlife Trust together with the Friends of Tiptree Heath.

This is the largest surviving area of heathland in Essex, and has a number of plants rare in the county. It is dominated by heather and bent grass. There is also an area of secondary woodland with oak, birch and aspen, and a stream with several species of fern on its banks. A small herd of Dexter cattle help to control the growth of invasive scrub.

The site straddles the B1022 Maldon Road.
