= Tolleshunt Knights =

Village in Essex, England

Coordinates: 51.8009°N 0.7787°E

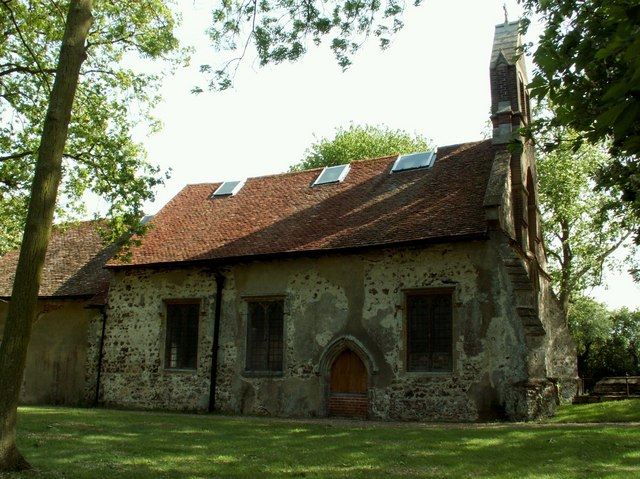
- All Saints’ Church, Tolleshunt Knights

- Location within Essex
- Population: 1,059 (Parish, 2021)
- OS grid reference: TL916150
- District: Maldon
- Shire county: Essex
- Region: East
- Country: England
- Sovereign state: United Kingdom
- Post town: MALDON
- Postcode district: CM9
- Post town: COLCHESTER
- Postcode district: CO5
- Dialling code: 01621
- Police: Essex
- Fire: Essex
- Ambulance: East of England
- UK Parliament: Witham

Tolleshunt Knights is a village and civil parish in the Maldon District of Essex, England. At the 2021 census the parish had a population of 1,059.

== History ==
The name Tolleshunt originates from the Anglo-Saxon Tolleshunta which means Toll's spring. Toll was an Anglo-Saxon chief who settled in large areas of forest, establishing clearings where water was readily available, and Tolleshunt Knights is one of a group of four resulting villages (Tolleshunt Major, Tolleshunt D'Arcy, Tollesbury Knights and Tollesbury), three of which bear the surnames of their early Norman French landowners (the Majeur, D'Arcy and Le Chevalier families).

Prior to the parish of Tiptree being created in 1934, much of the Tiptree Heath area was within the parish of Tolleshunt Knights.

== Amenities ==
The village is the site of the Patriarchal Stavropegic Monastery of St. John the Baptist, an Orthodox monastic community for men and women founded in 1958 by St Saphrony, one of the most noted ascetic monks of the 20th century..

Tolleshunt Knights Parish Council meets at the village hall on Top Road.
