= Great Totham =

Village in Essex, England

Coordinates: 51.779167°N 0.701111°E

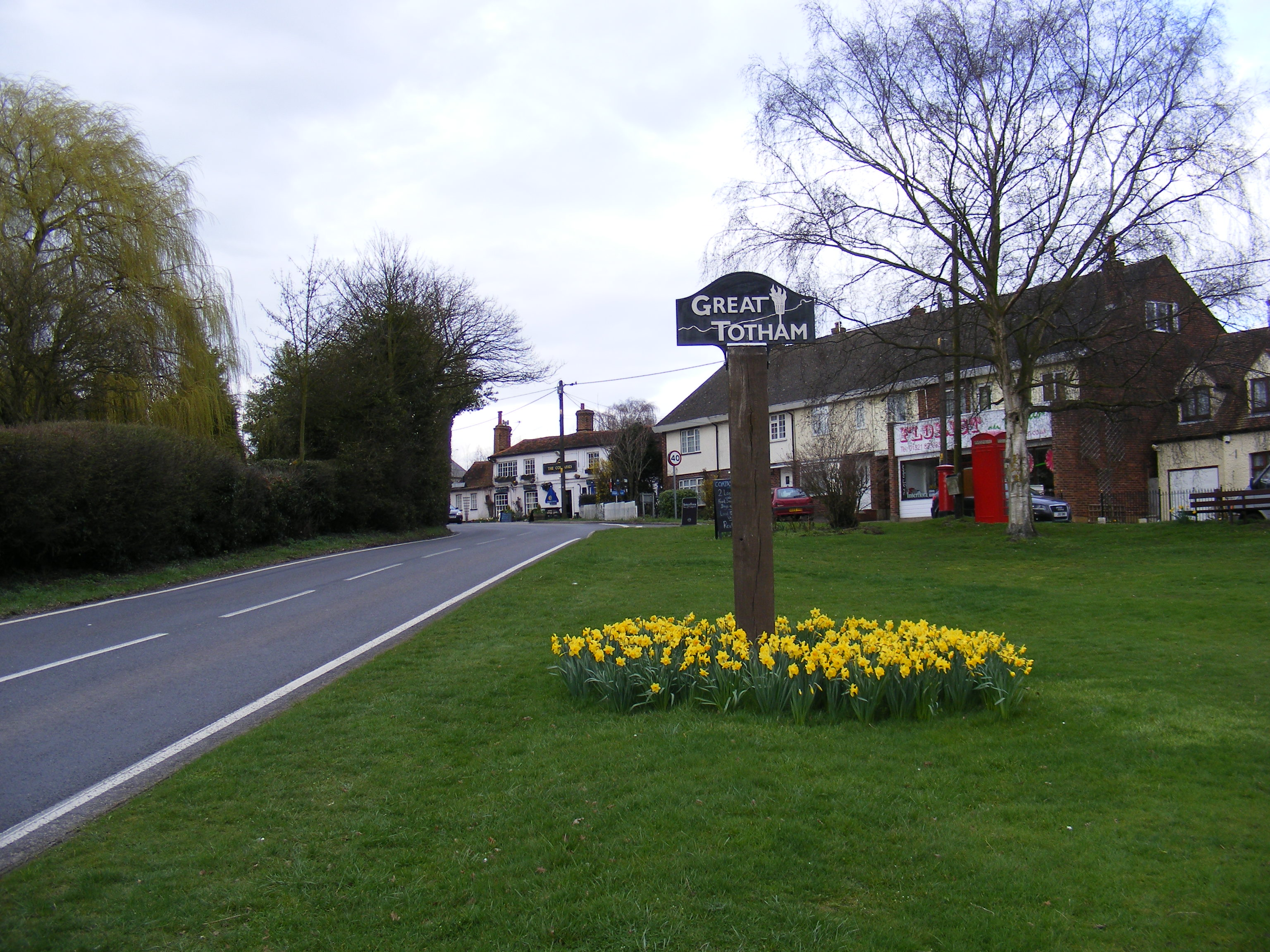
- Great Totham

- Location within Essex
- Population: 3,056 (Parish, 2021)
- OS grid reference: TL862122
- Civil parish: Great Totham
- District: Maldon
- Shire county: Essex
- Region: East
- Country: England
- Sovereign state: United Kingdom
- Post town: Maldon
- Postcode district: CM9
- Dialling code: 01621
- Police: Essex
- Fire: Essex
- Ambulance: East of England
- UK Parliament: Witham
- Website: Great Totham Parish Council

Great Totham is a village and civil parish in Maldon district, Essex, England, and midway between Chelmsford and Colchester. The village includes the Island of Osea in the Blackwater estuary and is separated into two parts, north and south. The north side and the south side are about a mile and a half apart, distributed along the B1022. The parish contains the hamlet of Totham Hill. At the 2021 census the parish had a population of 3,056.

== History ==
According to the old maps, before the time of the enclosures, the outskirts of Great Totham North were part of Tiptree Heath, which was then a haunt of smugglers, attested in the name of a house in Mountains Road called Spirits Hall. The 'mountain' in question is Beacon Hill which at 272 feet (83 m) is one of the highest points in the village of Great Totham. St Peter's Church which dates to Norman times. There is also the thatch-roofed Barn Chapel. This became a chapel in 1822 when an Isaac Foster donated the barn to be a place of worship for non-conformists.

The ancient road to Colchester by Tiptree Heath led through the parish of Great Totham, which in the reign of Queen Elizabeth I (1558–1603) was held of the Queen's manor of East Greenwich by William Beriff, an Alderman of Colchester, as her sub-tenant.

Great Totham village school's centenary was in 1977, but by that time the Victorian building, now demolished, had been replaced by a larger modern school on a different site. Honeywood School, a Grade II listed building, is a church school which was founded by the Honywood family of Marks Hall at Coggeshall in the mid-19th century, which had inherited the manor of Great Totham. This is still in use as the church hall and meeting room.

In the north of Great Totham there is a United Reformed Church dating to 1871. Recently refurbished, it is used for services and activities including a pre-school playgroup. Nearby, and adjoining the small village green, is the former Compasses public house which dates to the late 17th century. The Prince of Wales pub in Totham South was gutted by fire in 1990 with loss of historic features, but it has been rebuilt and reopened.

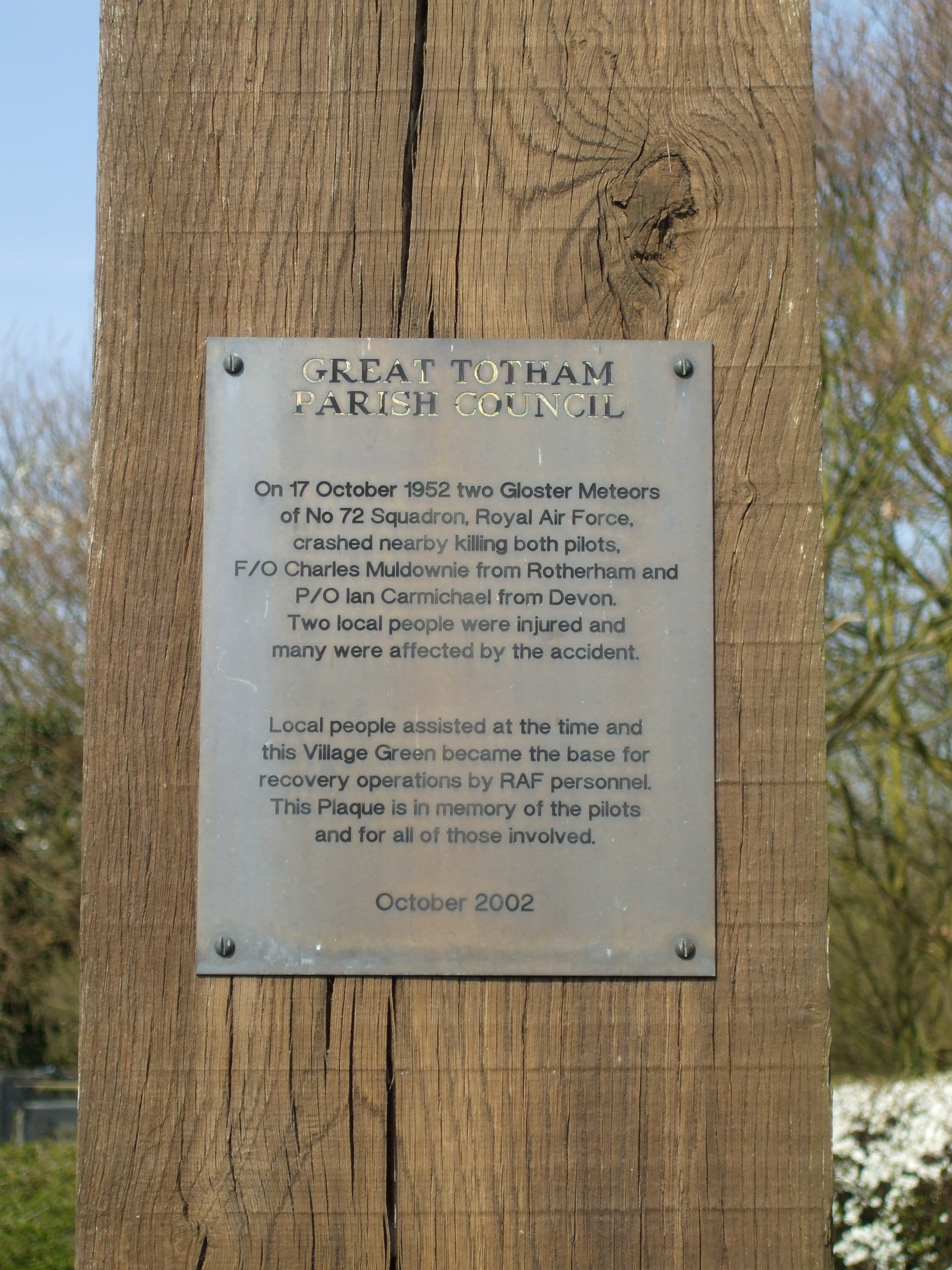
Village plaque

There are several former gravel pits that have become recreation areas for fishing lakes.

Great Totham has a village sign. A plaque, dated October 2002, attached to the village sign of the north area reads:

On 17 October 1952, two Gloster Meteors of No 72 Squadron, Royal Air Force, crashed nearby killing both pilots. F/O Charles Muldownie from Rotherham and P/O Ian Carmichael from Devon. Two local people were injured and many were affected by the accident.

Local people assisted at the time and this village green became the base for recovery operations by RAF personnel. This plaque is in memory of the pilots and for all those involved.

== Governance ==
The population of the electoral ward was 3,660 at the 2011 Census. Elected representatives at different levels of government act for Great Totham and surrounding villages. Two elected district councillors represent the parish on Maldon District Council. Great Totham is part of the Witham parliamentary constituency, and is represented in the House of Commons by Priti Patel of the Conservative Party.

== Community ==
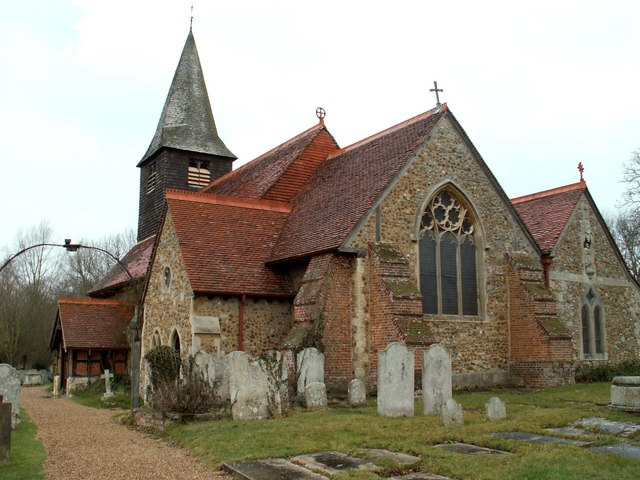
St Peter's Church, Great Totham

St Peter's Church on Church Road was Grade II listed in 1959, and dates to the 13th century.

The nearest National Health Service hospitals are Broomfield Hospital in Chelmsford and Colchester General Hospital in Colchester.

Great Totham Primary School is in Walden House Road, Great Totham.

The closest National Rail service is in Witham or Hatfield Peverel. The nearest London Underground line is the Central line at Newbury Park.

== Climate ==
In East Anglia, the warmest time of the year is July and August, when maximum temperatures average around 21 °C (70 °F). The coolest time of the year is January and February, when minimum temperatures average around 1 °C (34 °F) East Anglia's average annual rainfall is about 605 millimetres , with October to January being the wettest months.

Climate data for East Anglia (1971–2000 averages)
Month	Jan	Feb	Mar	Apr	May	Jun	Jul	Aug	Sep	Oct	Nov	Dec	Year
Mean daily maximum °C (°F)	6.7 (44.1)	7.1 (44.8)	9.9 (49.8)	12.3 (54.1)	16.1 (61.0)	19.0 (66.2)	21.8 (71.2)	21.9 (71.4)	18.6 (65.5)	14.4 (57.9)	9.8 (49.6)	7.6 (45.7)	13.8 (56.8)
Mean daily minimum °C (°F)	1.1 (34.0)	0.9 (33.6)	2.6 (36.7)	3.9 (39.0)	6.7 (44.1)	9.6 (49.3)	11.8 (53.2)	11.8 (53.2)	9.9 (49.8)	7.0 (44.6)	3.6 (38.5)	2.1 (35.8)	6.0 (42.8)
Average rainfall mm (inches)	53.4 (2.10)	37.2 (1.46)	44.8 (1.76)	45.3 (1.78)	44.8 (1.76)	54.3 (2.14)	46.0 (1.81)	50.1 (1.97)	55.6 (2.19)	59.0 (2.32)	58.5 (2.30)	56.8 (2.24)	605.8 (23.85)
Source: Met Office
