= Witham (constituency) =

UK Parliament constituency (since 2010)

Coordinates: 51.80°N 0.65°E

- County constituency for the House of Commons
- Interactive map of boundaries since 2024
- Location within the East of England
- County: Essex
- Electorate: 75,064 (March 2020)
- Major settlements: Stanway, Hatfield Peverel, Kelvedon, Marks Tey, White Notley, Witham

Current constituency
- Created: 2010
- Member of Parliament: Priti Patel (Conservative)
- Seats: One
- Created from: Braintree, Maldon and East Chelmsford, North Essex, Colchester

Witham is a parliamentary constituency in Essex represented by Dame Priti Patel in the House of Commons of the UK Parliament since its 2010 creation. She is a Conservative who was Home Secretary from 24 July 2019 until her resignation on 5 September 2022 following the announcement of the results of the Conservative Party leadership contest.

== Constituency profile ==
Witham is one of the safest Conservative seats in the country. The town of Witham within it is the only area of real Labour strength in the region, being represented by one District Councillor alongside seven Conservative Councillors.

Witham itself is an industrial town, on the Great Eastern main line railway from London to Norwich, with some heavy industry and London commuter belt residential areas – the strength of the Labour vote here was just enough to turn the former Braintree seat red in 1997, and in 2001, on the previous boundaries.

However, the town is small, and the Witham seat extends to cover a huge part of rural central Essex, with affluent commuter villages and farming communities that show high levels of Conservative support.

== History ==
The seat was created for the 2010 general election following a review of the Parliamentary representation of Essex by the Boundary Commission for England which resulted in radical alterations to existing constituencies to allow for an extra seat to be created due to increased population. As a consequence, the new seat of Witham was created which included parts of the constituencies of Braintree, Colchester, North Essex, and Maldon and East Chelmsford.

== Boundaries ==
Map of boundaries 2010–2024

=== 2010–2024 ===
- The District of Braintree wards of Black Notley and Terling, Bradwell, Silver End and Rivenhall, Coggeshall and North Feering, Hatfield Peverel, Kelvedon, Witham Chipping Hill and Central, Witham North, Witham South, and Witham West
- The District of Maldon wards of Great Totham, Tollesbury, Tolleshunt D'Arcy, and Wickham Bishops and Woodham
- The Borough of Colchester wards of Birch and Winstree, Copford and West Stanway, Marks Tey, Stanway and Tiptree

The District of Braintree wards, which comprised approximately half the electorate, were transferred from the Braintree constituency; the District of Maldon wards from the abolished constituency of Maldon and Chelmsford East; and the Borough of Colchester wards from the abolished constituency of North Essex, except for Stanway ward which had been in the Colchester constituency.

=== Current ===
Further to the 2023 review of Westminster constituencies, which came into effect for the 2024 general election, the composition of the constituency is as follows (as they existed on 1 December 2020):

- The District of Braintree wards of: Coggeshall; Hatfield Peverel & Terling; Kelvedon & Feering; Silver End & Cressing; The Colnes; Witham Central; Witham North; Witham South; Witham West.
- The City of Colchester wards of: Marks Tey & Layer; Stanway; Tiptree.
- The District of Maldon wards of: Great Totham; Tollesbury; Tolleshunt D’arcy; Wickham Bishops and Woodham.

Minor net gain from Braintree, primarily due to ward boundary changes.

== Members of Parliament ==
Braintree, Maldon & Chelmsford East and North Essex prior to 2010

Election	Member	Party
2010	Priti Patel	Conservative

== Elections ==
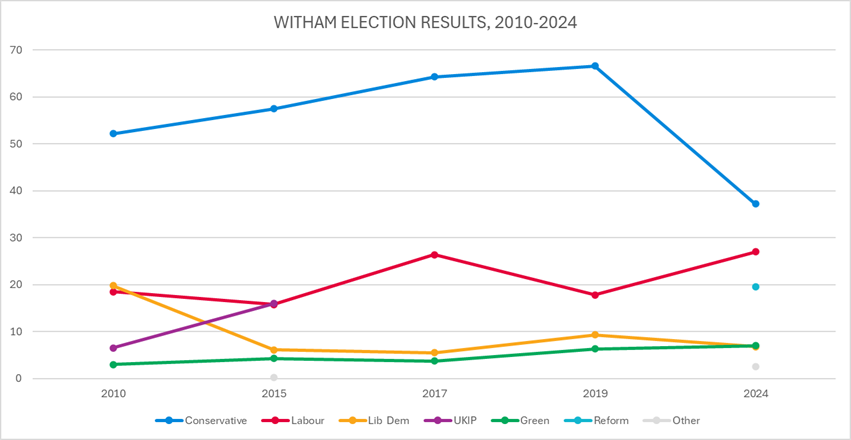
Election results 2010–2024

=== Elections in the 2020s ===
General election 2024: Witham
Party	Candidate	Votes	%	±%
Conservative	Priti Patel	18,827	37.2	−29.5
Labour	Rumi Chowdhury	13,682	27.0	+9.5
Reform	Timothy Blaxill	9,870	19.5	N/A
Green	James Abbott	3,539	7.0	+1.2
Liberal Democrats	Ashley Thompson	3,439	6.8	−3.2
Independent	Chelsey Jay	1,246	2.5	N/A
Majority		5,145	10.2	−38.6
Turnout		50,603	64.0	−5.4
Registered electors		79,072		
Conservative hold		Swing	−19.5	

=== Elections in the 2010s ===
2019 notional result
Party	Vote	%
Conservative	34,777	66.7
Labour	9,108	17.5
Liberal Democrats	5,214	10.0
Green	3,006	5.8
Turnout	52,105	69.4
Electorate	75,064	

General election 2019: Witham
Party	Candidate	Votes	%	±%
Conservative	Priti Patel	32,876	66.6	+2.3
Labour	Martin Edobor	8,794	17.8	−8.6
Liberal Democrats	Sam North	4,584	9.3	+3.8
Green	James Abbott	3,090	6.3	+2.6
Majority		24,082	48.8	+10.9
Turnout		49,344	70.1	−1.4
Conservative hold		Swing	+5.5	

General election 2017: Witham
Party	Candidate	Votes	%	±%
Conservative	Priti Patel	31,670	64.3	+6.8
Labour	Phil Barlow	13,024	26.4	+10.6
Liberal Democrats	Josephine Hayes	2,715	5.5	−0.6
Green	James Abbott	1,832	3.7	−0.6
Majority		18,646	37.9	−3.6
Turnout		49,400	71.5	+1.2
Conservative hold		Swing	−1.9	

General election 2015: Witham
Party	Candidate	Votes	%	±%
Conservative	Priti Patel	27,123	57.5	+5.3
UKIP	Garry Cockrill	7,569	16.0	+9.5
Labour	John Clarke	7,467	15.8	−2.7
Liberal Democrats	Josephine Hayes	2,891	6.1	−13.7
Green	James Abbott	2,038	4.3	+1.3
CPA	Doreen Scrimshaw	80	0.2	N/A
Majority		19,554	41.5	+9.1
Turnout		47,168	70.3	+0.1
Conservative hold		Swing	+9.5	

General election 2010: Witham
Party	Candidate	Votes	%	±%
Conservative	Priti Patel	24,448	52.2	+2.5
Liberal Democrats	Margaret Phelps	9,252	19.8	+4.6
Labour	John Spademan	8,656	18.5	−13.9
UKIP	David Hodges	3,060	6.5	N/A
Green	James Abbott	1,419	3.0	N/A
Majority		15,196	32.4	
Turnout		46,835	70.2	+6.6
Conservative hold		Swing	+1.1	

== See also ==
- Parliamentary constituencies in Essex
- Parliamentary constituencies in the East of England
