= Farm murders =

The term Farm murders can refer to:

- South African farm attacks, a term used in South African social discourse to refer to the murder of farmers since 1994.
- White House Farm murders, an event in which a number of murders took place near the village of Tolleshunt D'Arcy, England in August 1985
