= White House Farm murders =

1985 murders in England

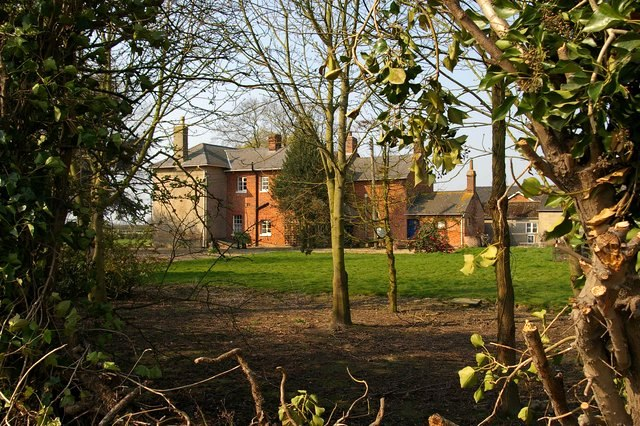
- White House Farm, 2007

- White House Farm, Essex
- Date: 7 August 1985
- Location: White House Farm, near Tolleshunt D'Arcy, Essex, England; 51°45′32″N 0°48′14″E
- Type: Mass shooting, mass murder, familicide
- Deaths: June Bamber (61); Nevill Bamber (61); Sheila Caffell (28); Daniel Caffell (6); Nicholas Caffell (6)
- Convicted: Jeremy Bamber (then 24), convicted on 28 October 1986 of five counts of murder
- Sentence: Whole-life order

The White House Farm murders took place near the village of Tolleshunt D'Arcy, Essex, England, during the night of 6–7 August 1985. Nevill and June Bamber were shot and killed inside their farmhouse at White House Farm along with their adopted daughter, Sheila Caffell, and Sheila's six-year-old twin sons, Daniel and Nicholas Caffell. The only surviving member of the immediate family was the adopted son, Jeremy Bamber, then aged 24, who said he had been at home a few miles away when the shooting took place.

Police initially believed that Sheila, who had been diagnosed with schizophrenia, had fired the shots before turning the gun on herself, but weeks after the murders, Jeremy's ex-girlfriend told police that he had implicated himself. The prosecution argued that, motivated by a large inheritance, Jeremy had shot the family with his father's semi-automatic rifle, then placed the gun in Sheila's hands to make the deaths look like a murder–suicide. A silencer, the prosecution said, was on the rifle and would have made it too long, they argued, for Sheila's fingers to reach the trigger to shoot herself. Jeremy was convicted of five counts of murder in October 1986 by a 10–2 majority verdict, sentenced to a minimum of twenty-five years, and informed in 1994 that he would never be released. The Court of Appeal upheld the verdict in 2002.

Jeremy protested his innocence throughout, although his extended family remained convinced of his guilt. Between 2004 and 2012, his lawyers submitted several unsuccessful applications to the Criminal Cases Review Commission, arguing that the silencer might not have been used during the killings, that the crime scene might have been damaged then reconstructed, that crime scene photographs were taken weeks after the murders, and that the time of Sheila's death had been miscalculated.

A key issue was whether Jeremy had received a call from his father on the night of the murder to tell him Sheila had "gone berserk" with a gun. Jeremy said that he did, that he alerted police and that Sheila fired the final shot while he and the officers were standing outside the house. It became a central plank of the prosecution's case that the father had made no such call and that the only reason Jeremy would have lied about it—the only way he could have known about the shootings when he alerted the police—was that he was the killer himself.

== Bamber family ==
=== June and Nevill Bamber ===
Nevill and June Bamber. A key issue was whether their daughter Sheila was strong enough to have subdued Nevill, who was 6 ft 4 in (193 cm) tall, in what appeared to have been a violent struggle in the kitchen.

Ralph Nevill Bamber (known as 'Nevill', born 8 June 1924) was a farmer, former Royal Air Force (RAF) pilot and magistrate at the local Witham magistrates' court. He and his wife, June (née Speakman, born 3 June 1924), had married in 1949 and moved into the Georgian White House Farm on Pages Lane, Tolleshunt D'Arcy, Essex, set among 300 acres (120 ha) of tenant farmland that had belonged to June's father. The Court of Appeal described Nevill as "a well-built man, 6 ft 4 in (193 cm) tall and in good physical health." This became significant because Jeremy's defence later suggested that Sheila, a slim woman aged 28, had been able to beat and subdue her father, something the prosecution contested.

Unable to have biological children, the Bambers adopted Sheila and Jeremy as infants; the children were not related to each other. June suffered from depression and had been admitted to a psychiatric hospital in the 1950s, including in 1958 after Sheila's adoption, where she was given electroshock therapy at least six times. In 1982 she was treated by Hugh Ferguson, a psychiatrist who later saw Sheila.

The Bambers were financially secure, owning property that included the farmhouse, a flat in London, 300 acres (120 ha) of land, and a caravan site. The couple gave the children a good home and private education, but June was intensely religious and tried to force her children and grandchildren to adopt the same ideas. She had a poor relationship with Sheila, who felt June disapproved of her, and June's relationship with Jeremy was so troubled that he had apparently stopped speaking to her. Sheila's ex-husband was concerned about the effect June was having on his sons; she made them kneel and pray with her, which upset him and the boys.

=== Daniel and Nicholas Caffell ===
Daniel and Nicholas Caffell were born on 22 June 1979 to Sheila and Colin Caffell, who had married in 1977 and would divorce in 1982. Colin was an art student when he met Sheila. After the divorce, both he and Sheila were involved in the children's upbringing although the boys were briefly in foster care in 1982–83 because of Sheila's health problems. For several months before the murders, they had been living with Colin in his home in Kilburn, North London, not far from Sheila's residence in Maida Vale.

A week-long visit to White House Farm had been arranged for August 1985 at the Bambers' request; the plan was for the twins to visit their grandparents with Sheila before the boys went on holiday in Norway with their father. Daniel and Nicholas were reluctant to stay at the farm. June made them pray, which they disliked, and, in the car on the way there, they asked Colin to speak to her about it. Also, Daniel had become vegetarian and was worried about being forced to eat meat. When their father dropped them off at the house on 4 August, it would be the last time he would ever see them. The boys are buried together in Highgate Cemetery. Sheila was cremated, and the urn with her ashes was placed in their coffin.

=== Sheila Caffell ===
==== Background ====
Nicholas, Sheila and Daniel Caffell, circa 1984

Sheila Jean "Bambi" Caffell (born 18 July 1957) was born to the 18-year-old daughter of Eric Jay, a senior chaplain to the Archbishop of Canterbury. At his insistence, the baby was placed for adoption. Her mother gave Sheila up to the Church of England Children's Society two weeks after the birth, and the Bambers adopted her in October 1957. The chaplain had known Nevill in the RAF and selected the Bambers from a list of prospective adopters.

After school Sheila attended secretarial college in Swiss Cottage, London. In 1974, when she was aged 17, she discovered she was pregnant by Colin Caffell. The Bambers arranged an abortion. Her relationship with her mother deteriorated significantly that summer after June found Sheila and Colin sunbathing naked in a field. June reportedly started calling Sheila the "devil's child."

Sheila continued with her secretarial course, then trained as a hairdresser, and briefly worked as a model with the Lucie Clayton Charm Academy, including two months' work in Tokyo. After she became pregnant again, she married Colin at Chelmsford Register Office in May 1977, but miscarried in the sixth month. The Bambers bought the couple a garden flat in Carlingford Road, Hampstead, to help Sheila recuperate. Sheila suffered another miscarriage, then on 22 June 1979, after four months of bed rest in hospital, she gave birth to Daniel and Nicholas. Colin, apparently having begun an affair just before the birth, left Sheila for five months. Sheila became increasingly upset; on one occasion, when Colin left her 21st birthday party with another woman, she required hospital treatment after breaking a window with her fist. The couple divorced in May 1982.

After the divorce, Nevill bought Sheila a flat in Morshead Mansions, Maida Vale, and Colin helped raise the children from his home in nearby Kilburn. Sheila decided to trace her birth mother, then living in Canada. They met at Heathrow Airport in 1982 for a brief reunion, but a relationship did not develop. At around this time Sheila became friendly with a group of young women who nicknamed her "Bambi", and who later told reporters that she often complained about her poor relationship with her adoptive mother. The group partook in drugs, particularly cocaine, and fraternisations with older men. As her brief modelling career had ended after the birth of the boys, Sheila lived on welfare and took low-paying jobs, including as a waitress for one week at School Dinners, a London restaurant in which dinner was served by young women in school uniform, stockings and suspenders. There were also cleaning jobs and one episode of nude photography that she later regretted.

==== Health ====
Sheila's mental health continued to decline, with episodes of banging her head against walls. In 1983, her family doctor referred her to Hugh Ferguson, the psychiatrist who had treated June. Ferguson said Sheila was in an agitated state, paranoid and psychotic. She was admitted to St Andrew's Hospital, a private psychiatric facility, where Ferguson diagnosed a schizoaffective disorder. After Sheila was discharged in September 1983, he continued seeing her as an out-patient and concluded that his first diagnosis had been mistaken. Ferguson now believed that she had schizophrenia and began treating her with trifluoperazine, an antipsychotic drug.

Ferguson wrote that Sheila believed the devil had given her the power to project evil onto others, and that she could make her sons have sex and cause violence with her. She called them the "devil's children", the phrase June had used of Sheila, and said she believed she was capable of murdering them or of getting them to kill others. She spoke about suicide, although the court heard that Ferguson did not regard her as a suicide risk.

Sheila was readmitted to St Andrew's in March 1985, five months before the murders, after a psychotic episode in which she believed herself to be in direct communication with God and that certain people, including her boyfriend, were trying to hurt or kill her. She was discharged four weeks later, and as an out-patient received a monthly injection of haloperidol, an antipsychotic drug that has a sedative effect. From that point, the twins lived all or most of the time with Colin in Kilburn. According to Jeremy, the family discussed placing the boys in daytime foster care over dinner on the night of the murders, with little response from Sheila.

Despite Sheila's erratic mental state, Ferguson told the court that the kind of violence necessary to commit the murders was not consistent with his view of her. In particular, he said he did not believe she would have killed her father or children, because her difficult relationship was confined to her mother. Colin said the same: that, despite her tendency to throw things and sometimes hit him, she had never harmed the children. June's sister, Pamela Boutflour, testified that Sheila was not a violent person and that she had never known her to use a gun; June's niece, Ann Eaton, told the court that Sheila did not know how to use one. Jeremy disputed this, telling police on the night of the shooting, as they stood outside the house, that he and Sheila had gone target shooting together. He acknowledged later that he had not seen her fire a gun as an adult.

=== Jeremy Bamber ===
Bamber shortly after his arrest in September 1985

Jeremy Nevill Bamber was born on 13 January 1961 to a student midwife who, after an affair with a married British Army sergeant, gave her baby to the Church of England Children's Society when he was six weeks old. His biological parents later married and had other children; his father became a senior staff member in Buckingham Palace. The Bambers adopted Jeremy when he was six months old. They sent him to St Nicholas Primary, then along with Sheila to Maldon Court prep school. This was followed when he was aged 9, in September 1970, by Gresham's School, a boarding school in Holt, Norfolk, where he joined the cadet force. Jeremy was apparently unhappy at Gresham's because of bullying and other factors.

After leaving Gresham's with no qualifications, Jeremy attended sixth form college, and in 1978 achieved seven O-levels. Nevill paid for him to visit Australia, where he took a scuba-diving course, before travelling to New Zealand. Former friends alleged that Jeremy had broken into a jeweller's shop while in New Zealand and had stolen an expensive watch. He had also boasted, they said, of being involved in smuggling heroin. Jeremy returned to England in 1982 to work on his adoptive parents' farm for £170 a week, and set up home in a cottage Nevill owned at 9 Head Street, Goldhanger. (Note: Cottage at 9 Head Street, Goldhanger: 51.745857°N 0.755881°E) The cottage lay 3–3.5 miles (5.6 km) from White House Farm, (Note: White House Farm farmhouse: 51.7591°N 0.8032°E) a five-minute drive by car and at least fifteen minutes by bicycle. Nevill also gave Jeremy a car to use, and eight percent of a family company, Osea Road Camp Sites Ltd, which ran the Bambers' caravan site.

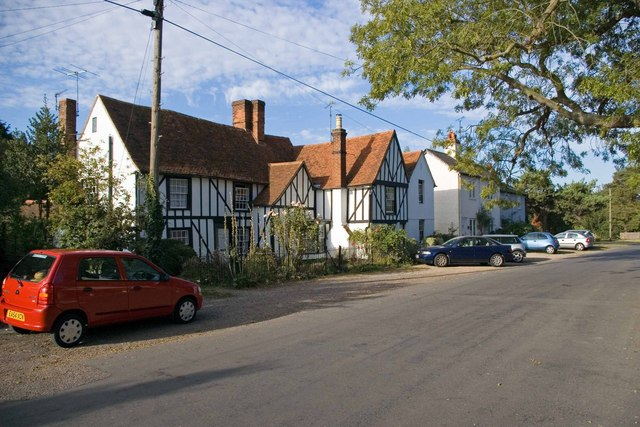
Jeremy lived in Head Street, Goldhanger, Essex.

To his supporters, who over the years have included Members of Parliament and journalists, Jeremy is a victim of one of Britain's worst miscarriages of justice. The Guardian took up his case in the early 1990s; one or more Guardian journalists began corresponding with him in 2006, and two interviewed him in 2011. Describing Jeremy as "clever and strategic", they wrote that there was something about him that made the public unsympathetic toward him. He was "handsome in a rather cruel, caddish way—he seemed to exude arrogance and indifference. ... Like Meursault in the Camus novel L'Étranger, he did not seem to display the appropriate emotions." He is reported to have passed a polygraph test in 2007.

Jeremy's detractors include his extended family and his father's former secretary, Barbara Wilson. She told reporters that Jeremy used to provoke his parents, riding in circles around his mother on a bicycle, wearing make-up to upset his father and once hiding a bag of live rats in Wilson's car. Whenever Jeremy visited the farm there were arguments, she claimed. Tension had apparently increased in the weeks before the murders; Wilson said Nevill had remarked to her about foreseeing a "shooting accident." Jeremy's ex-girlfriend, Julie Mugford, alleged that he had talked about killing his family. A farm worker testified that Jeremy had once said of Sheila: "I'm not going to share my money with my sister." The court heard that, in March that year, while discussing security at the family's caravan site, he had told his uncle: "I could kill anybody. I could even [or 'easily'] kill my parents." Jeremy denied having said this.

=== Extended family, inheritance ===
The financial ties and inheritance issues within the immediate and extended family provided a motive and added a layer of complexity to the case. The Bambers' company, N. and J. Bamber Ltd, was worth £400,000 in 1985 (c. £1,061,016 in 2021). In their wills, June left £230,000 (c. £608,000) and Nevill £380,000 (c. £1,004,000). During the trial, the court heard that the Bambers had left their estate to both Jeremy and Sheila, to be divided equally. In addition, Nevill's will had said that, to inherit, Jeremy had to be working on the farm at the time of his father's death. The court also heard, from Mugford's mother, that he had been saying June wanted to change her will to bypass him and Sheila and leave her estate to Sheila's twins instead.

The parents' estate included land and buildings occupied by Jeremy's cousins, who were made aware, after the murders, that he intended to sell them. It was one of those cousins who found the silencer in the gun cupboard, with the flecks of blood and paint that proved pivotal to the prosecution. Because of Jeremy's conviction, the estate passed instead to the cousins. One moved into White House Farm, while that cousin and several others acquired full ownership of the caravan site and other buildings. This conflict of interest became a bone of contention, as did the apparent failure of the police to search and secure the crime scene. Jeremy argues that the family set him up, a claim that one of the group dismissed in 2010 as "an absolute load of piffle."

Jeremy has launched two legal actions while in prison, claiming a share of the estate, which the cousins said was part of an attempt to harass and vilify them. In 2003, he began a High Court action to recover £1.2 million from the estate of his maternal grandmother, arguing that he should have inherited her home at Carbonnells Farm, Wix, which went instead to June's sister—the grandmother had cut Jeremy out of her will when he was arrested—and that he was owed seventeen years' rent from his cousins who lived there. In 2004, he went to the High Court again to claim a £326,000 share of the profit from the caravan site. The court ruled against him in both cases.

== Jeremy's visit to the farm ==
=== Atmosphere in the house ===
On Sunday, 4 August 1985, three days before the murders, Sheila and the boys arrived at White House Farm to spend the week with Nevill and June. The housekeeper saw Sheila that day and noticed nothing unusual. Two farm workers saw her the following day with her children and said she seemed happy. One of the crime scene photographs showed that someone had carved "I hate this place" into the cupboard doors of the bedroom in which the twins were sleeping.

Jeremy visited the farm on the evening of Tuesday, 6 August. He told the court that during his visit his parents suggested to Sheila that the boys be placed in daytime foster care with a local family; he said Sheila did not seem bothered by the suggestion and had simply said she would rather stay in London. The boys had been in foster care before, although in London rather than near White House Farm, and it had not appeared to cause a problem for Sheila. Ferguson told the Court of Appeal in 2002 that any suggestion that the children be removed from her care would have provoked a strong reaction from Sheila, but that she might have welcomed daytime help.

A farmworker heard Jeremy leave around 9:30 pm. Barbara Wilson, the farm's secretary, telephoned Nevill at around that time and was left with the impression that she had interrupted an argument. She said Nevill was short with her and seemed to hang up in irritation, something he had never done before; he was by all accounts an even-tempered man. June's sister, Pamela Boutflour, telephoned around 10 pm. She spoke to Sheila, who she said was quiet, then to June, who seemed normal.

=== Murder weapon ===
Jeremy told the court that, hours before the murders on 6 August, he had loaded the rifle, thinking he heard rabbits outside, but had not used it. He left the rifle on the kitchen table, with a full magazine and a box of ammunition, before leaving the house. It did not at that point have the silencer or telescopic sight attached, he claimed. Both had been on the rifle in late July, according to a nephew, but Jeremy said his father must have removed them. The prosecution disputed this, maintaining that the silencer was on the rifle when the family was murdered.

Nevill kept several guns at the farm. He was reportedly careful with them, cleaning them after use and securing them. He had bought the gun, a .22 Anschütz model 525 semi-automatic rifle, on 30 November 1984, along with a Parker Hale silencer, telescopic sight and 500 rounds of ammunition. It used cartridges, which were loaded into a magazine that held ten rounds. Twenty-five shots were fired during the killing, so if the rifle was fully loaded to begin with, it would have been reloaded at least twice. The court heard that the magazine became harder to load with each cartridge; loading the tenth was described as "exceptionally hard".

The rifle had normally been used to shoot rabbits with the silencer and telescopic sight attached. The court heard that the sight had to be removed with a screwdriver, but it was usually left in place because it was time-consuming to realign it. Nevill's nephew visited the farmhouse on the weekend of 26–28 July 1985 and told the court that he had seen the rifle, in the gun cupboard in the ground-floor office, with the sight and silencer attached. He had taken the gun out and used it for target shooting.

== Police logs, 7 August 1985 ==
=== Telephones in the farmhouse ===
There were three telephones at White House Farm on the night of the shooting, all on the same landline. There was usually a cream rotary phone in the main bedroom on Nevill's bedside table; a beige Statesman phone in the kitchen; and a blue Sceptre 100 phone in the office on the first floor. (There was a fourth phone too, an Envoy cordless phone in the kitchen, but it had been picked up for repair on 5 August.) The rotary phone had at some point been moved out of the main bedroom and into the kitchen, where the police found it with its receiver off the hook. They found the Statesman phone still in the kitchen but hidden in a pile of magazines. (Note: [2002] EWCA Crim 2912, 430: "At trial the evidence was that when the kitchen was entered the telephone in the kitchen was off the hook as can be seen in a number of photographs particularly photographs 13 and 14. The defence contended that the telephone off the hook was entirely consistent with Nevill having phoned the Appellant. The Prosecution countered this by alleging that the Appellant had set the scene. They drew attention to the fact that Nevill was severely bloodied and that the telephone had no visible blood upon it although no swabs were taken from it.")

=== Jeremy's call to police ===
Jeremy telephoned Chelmsford police station (and not the 999 emergency number) from his home in the early hours of 7 August to raise the alarm. He told them he had received a telephone call from his father—from the landline at White House Farm to the landline at Bamber's home—to say that Sheila had "gone berserk" with a gun. Jeremy said the line went dead in the middle of the call.

The prosecution argued that Jeremy had received no such call, and that his claim to have done so was part of his setting the scene to blame Sheila. Nevill was "severely bloodied" at that point, according to the Court of Appeal, but the telephone had "no visible blood" on it when police examined the scene, although it was acknowledged that no swabs had been taken. It was Jeremy, the prosecution said, who had left the kitchen telephone off the hook after calling his home from White House Farm to establish that part of his alibi. (Note: [2002] EWCA Crim 2912, 149: "The appellant returned the moderator to the gun cupboard and before leaving the address called his home at Goldhanger, leaving the receiver off the hook, thus lending support to the alibi he would later rely upon. He then left the premises, one available route being to climb out of the kitchen window, banging it from the outside to drop the catch back into position and then cycled home.")

After Jeremy telephoned the police, a British Telecom operator checked the White House Farm line—at 3:56 am according to the police log, and at 4:30 am according to the Court of Appeal—and found that the line was open. The operator could hear a dog barking. British Telecom did not at the time keep records of local calls. According to experts who testified at the trial, if Nevill had telephoned Jeremy without replacing the receiver, the line between them would have remained open for one or two minutes. During this time, Jeremy would not have been able to use his telephone.

Explaining why he had called a local police station and not 999, Jeremy told police on the night that he had not thought it would make a difference to how soon they would arrive. He said he had spent time looking up the number, and even though his father had asked him to come quickly, he had first telephoned his girlfriend, Julie Mugford, in London, then had driven slowly to the farmhouse. Jeremy acknowledged that he could have called one of the farm workers but had not considered it. In his early witness statements, Jeremy said he had telephoned the police immediately after receiving his father's call, then telephoned Mugford. During later police interviews, he said he had called Mugford first. Jeremy said he was confused about the sequence of events.

=== Logs ===
==== Event log ====
In 2010, Jeremy's lawyers highlighted two police logs in support of his application to have his case referred back to the Court of Appeal. The question was whether these logs support the prosecution position that there was one call that night to the police, from Jeremy alone, or the defence position that there were two calls, one from Nevill followed by a second from Jeremy.

One log shows that Jeremy rang the local police station and spoke to police constable Michael West in the information room. As a result, West began an "event log". This states that Jeremy's call came in at 3:36 am on 7 August 1985. Jeremy maintains that he telephoned ten minutes after his father phoned him. But at trial it was accepted that West had misread a digital clock and that the call had probably come in just before 3:26 am, because that was when West asked a civilian dispatcher, Malcolm Bonnett, to send a car to the scene. The car, Charlie Alpha 5, was dispatched at 3:35 am. (Note: [2002] EWCA Crim 2912, 24–27: "In the early hours of Wednesday, 7 August the appellant telephoned Chelmsford Police Station on a direct line number as opposed to the 999 emergency call system and spoke to PC West. He said, 'You've got to help me. My father has just rung me and said, "Please come over. Your sister has gone crazy and has got the gun." Then the line went dead'. He explained that he had tried to ring his father back at White House Farm but he could not get a reply. "Using a radio link PC West contacted Malcolm Bonnet at the Chelmsford H/Q Information Room. PC West then spoke to the appellant again, who complained at the time the officer was taking. He said, "When my father rang he sounded terrified". The appellant was told to go to the farm and to wait there for the police. PC West described the appellant as sounding 'very laconic' and calm during the first part of their conversation and said that there was no sense of urgency. When he spoke to him again the appellant appeared 'more urgent and distressed in his manner'. "PC West recorded the time of the appellant's call as 3.36 a.m. At trial it was accepted that the officer had misread a digital clock. The officer's contact with Mr Bonnett was recorded as being at 3.26 a.m. and it seems clear that the appellant's call must have been at 3.26 a.m. or very shortly before. "At 3.35 am, Mr Bonnet arranged for a police car to go to White House Farm. A check made by a British Telecom operator of the telephone line to the farm was made at 4.30 am. The receiver was off the hook and all the operator could hear was a dog barking.") The event log noted a call from:

Mr. Bamber, 9 Head Street, Goldhanger ... [Bamber's home address]. Father phoned (age 62). "Please come over. Your sister has gone crazy + has the gun." Phone went dead. Father Mr. Bamber H/A White House Farm ... Sister Sheila Bamber age 27. Has history of mental illness. ... Despatched CA5 [Charlie Alpha 5] to scene ... Informant requested to attend scene."

Radio log: "Daughter gone berserk".

The Court of Appeal noted that Jeremy said he had "tried to ring his father back at White House Farm but he could not get a reply". During the trial, the court heard that Jeremy said his father had not hung up after speaking and that he could hear noise in the background. At some point PC West spoke to Jeremy again on the telephone; Jeremy apparently complained about the time the police were taking, saying: "When my father rang he sounded terrified." He was told to go to the farm and wait for the police.

==== Radio log ====
Michael Bonnett, a civilian dispatcher in Chelmsford police station's information room, began a "radio log" which kept track of messages about the situation. The radio log discusses a telephone call made at 3:26 am on 7 August. According to the prosecution, this is the call known to have been made by Jeremy, the same call entered in the event log. According to the defence, the radio log is not simply a duplicate log of Jeremy's call but a log of a separate call to the police by Nevill.

The radio log is headed, "Daughter gone berserk": "Mr Bamber, White House Farm, Tolleshunt d’Arcy—daughter Sheila Bamber, aged 26 years, has got hold of one of my guns." It adds: "Message passed to CD by the son of Mr Bamber after phone went dead." It goes on to say: "Mr Bamber has a collection of shotguns and .410s", and it includes White House Farm's telephone number. The final entry says: "0356 GPO [the telephone operator] have checked phone line to farmhouse and confirm phone left off hook." The radio log shows that a patrol car, Charlie Alpha 7 (CA7)—not Charlie Alpha 5, as mentioned in the event log—was sent to the scene at 3:35 am.

== Scene at White House Farm ==
=== Events outside ===
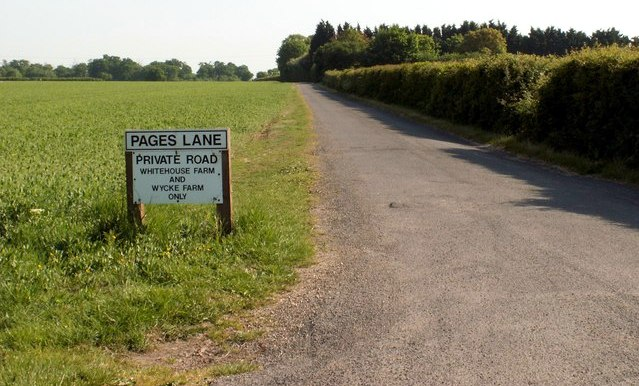
Pages Lane leading to White House Farm

After the telephone calls, Jeremy drove to the farmhouse, as did three officers from Witham police station who later testified that he had been driving much more slowly than them; they passed him on Pages Lane and arrived at the farmhouse one or two minutes before him. Jeremy's cousin, Ann Eaton, testified that he was normally a fast driver. The group waited outside the house for a tactical firearms unit to arrive, which turned up at 5 am and decided to wait until daylight before trying to enter. Police determined that all the doors and windows to the house were shut except for the window in the main bedroom on the first floor. Using a loudhailer, they spent two hours trying to communicate with Sheila. The only sound they reported from the house was a dog barking.

While waiting outside, the police questioned Jeremy, who they said seemed calm. According to the Court of Appeal, Jeremy told them about the phone call from his father and that it had sounded as though someone had cut off the call. He also said he did not get along with his sister. When asked whether she might have "gone berserk with a gun", the police said he replied: "I don't really know. She is a nutter. She's been having treatment." When asked why Nevill would have called Jeremy and not the police, he replied that his father was the sort of person who might want to keep things within the family. Jeremy claimed to have called Chelmsford police station, rather than 999, because he did not think it would affect the police's response time. Over the next few hours, he talked about cars in general with one of the officers, saying that the Osea Road caravan site "would be able to stand him a Porsche" soon.

Jeremy told the police that Sheila was familiar with guns and that they had gone target shooting together. He said he had been at the farmhouse himself a few hours earlier, and that he had loaded the rifle because he thought he had heard rabbits outside. Jeremy had left the rifle on the kitchen table fully loaded, with a box of ammunition nearby. A doctor who was called to the house testified the deaths could have occurred at any time during the night. He said Jeremy appeared to be in a state of shock: he broke down, cried and seemed to vomit. The doctor said Jeremy told him about the discussion the family had had about possibly placing Sheila's sons in foster care.

=== Scene inside ===
==== Apparent struggle ====
The police entered the farmhouse at 7:54 am, using a sledgehammer to break the back door. The door had been locked from the inside, with the key still in the lock. They found five bodies with multiple gunshot wounds, Nevill downstairs in the kitchen and the rest upstairs. Twenty-five shots had been fired, mostly at close range. In what order the family was killed is not known. A telephone was lying on one of the kitchen surfaces with its receiver off the hook, next to empty .22 cartridge cases. The police said chairs and stools were overturned, and there was broken crockery, a broken sugar basin, a broken ceiling light, and what looked like blood on the floor.

==== Nevill ====
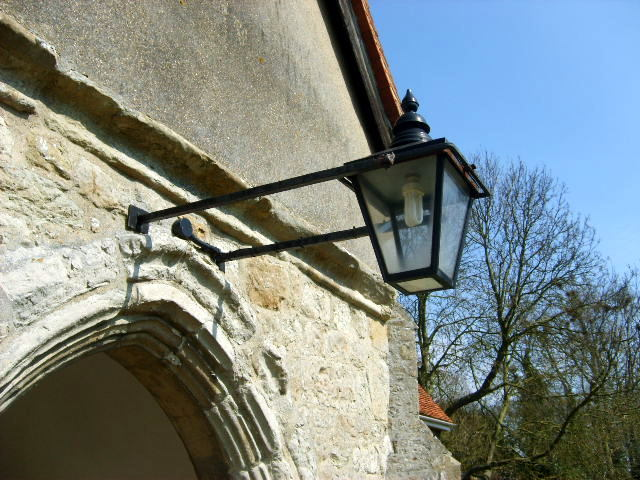
The lantern outside St. Nicholas's Church, Tolleshunt D'Arcy, was given in memory of Nevill and June Bamber, who had been churchwardens there.

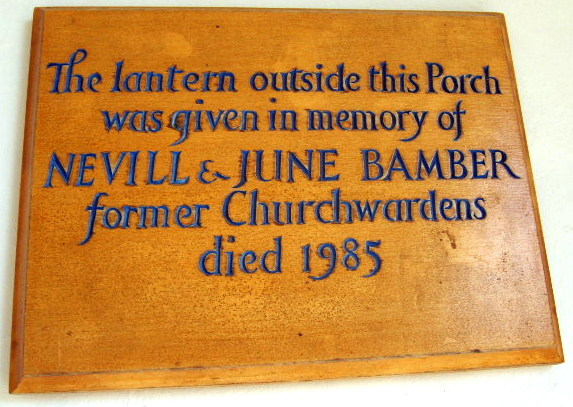

Nevill was found in the kitchen, dressed in pyjamas, lying over an overturned chair next to the fireplace, amid a scene suggestive of a struggle. He had been shot eight times, six times to the head and face, fired when the rifle was a few inches from his skin. The remaining shots to his body had occurred from at least two feet away. Based on where the empty cartridge cases were found—three in the kitchen and one on the stairs—the police concluded that he had been shot four times upstairs, but had managed to get downstairs where a struggle took place, and during which he was hit several times with the rifle and shot again, this time fatally.

There were two wounds to Nevill's right side, and two to the top of his head which would probably have resulted in unconsciousness. The left side of his lip was wounded, his jaw was fractured, and his teeth, neck and larynx were damaged. The pathologist said he "would not have been able to engage in purposeful talk", according to the Court of Appeal. There were gunshot wounds to his left shoulder and left elbow. The court heard that he had "black eyes and a broken nose, linear bruising to the cheeks, lacerations to the head, linear type bruising to the right forearm, bruising to the left wrist and forearm and three circular burn type marks to the back. The linear marks were consistent with Mr Bamber having been struck with a long blunt object, possibly a gun." One of the pillars of the prosecution case was that Sheila would not have been strong enough to inflict this beating on Nevill, who was 6 ft 4 in (1.93 m) tall and by all accounts in good health.

==== June ====
June's body and clothing were heavily bloodstained; she was found in her nightdress with bare feet. The police believe she had been sitting up during part of the attack, based on the pattern of blood on her clothing. She was found lying on the floor by the door of the master bedroom. June had been shot seven times. One shot to her forehead, between her eyes, was fired from under one foot (30 cm) away. That and another shot to the right side of her head would both have caused her death quickly, the court heard. There were also shots to the right side of her lower neck and to her right forearm, and two injuries on the right side of her chest and right knee.

==== Daniel and Nicholas ====
The boys were found in their beds in their own room (formerly Sheila's room). They appeared to have been shot while in bed. The court heard that Daniel had been shot five times in the back of the head, four times with the gun held within one foot (30 cm) of his head, and once from over two feet (60 cm) away. Nicholas had been shot three times, all contact or close-proximity shots.

==== Sheila ====
Sheila was found on the floor of the master bedroom with her mother. She was in her nightdress, her feet were bare, and she had two bullet wounds under her chin, one of them on her throat. The pathologist, Peter Vanezis, said that the lower of the injuries had occurred from three inches (76 mm) away and that the higher one was a contact injury. The higher of the two would have killed her immediately. The lower injury would have killed her too, he said, but not necessarily straight away. Vanezis testified that it would be possible for a person with such an injury to stand up and walk around, but the lack of blood on her nightdress suggested to him that she had not done this. He believed that the lower of her injuries had happened first because it had caused bleeding inside the neck; the court heard that if the immediately fatal wound had happened first, the bleeding would not have occurred to the same extent. The pattern of bloodstains on her nightdress suggested she had been sitting up when she received both injuries, Vanezis said.

Blood and urine samples indicated that Sheila had taken haloperidol and, several days earlier, had used cannabis. There were no marks on her body suggestive of a struggle. The firearms officer who first saw her said her feet and hands were clean, her fingernails manicured and not broken, and her fingertips free of blood, dirt or powder. There was no trace of lead dust. The rifle magazine would have been loaded at least twice during the killings; this would usually leave lubricant and material from the bullets on the hands. A scenes-of-crimes officer, Detective Constable Hammersley, said there were bloodstains on the back of her right hand but that otherwise her hands were clean.

There was no blood on Sheila's feet or other debris, such as the sugar that was on the downstairs floor. Low traces of lead were found on her hands and forehead at post-mortem, but the levels were consistent with the everyday handling of things around the house. A forensic scientist, Brian Elliott, testified that if Sheila had loaded eighteen cartridges into a magazine he would expect to see more lead on her hands. The blood on her nightdress was consistent with her own, and no trace of firearm-discharge residue was on it. Given that Sheila was wearing just a nightdress, it was hard to see how she could have carried the cartridges. The rifle, without the silencer or sights attached, was lying on her body pointing up at her neck. June's Bible lay on the floor to the right of Sheila. It was normally kept in a bedside cupboard. June's fingerprints were on it, as were others that could not be identified, including one made by a child.

== Police investigation ==
=== Murder-suicide theory, crime scene ===
Front page of the Daily Express, 8 August 1985

The police and media were initially convinced by the murder-suicide theory. Detective Chief Inspector Thomas Jones, deputy head of CID, was so sure Sheila had killed her family that he ordered Jeremy's cousins out of his office when they asked him to consider whether Jeremy had set the whole thing up. The Daily Express reported on 8 August 1985, the day after the murders:

A farming family affectionately dubbed "The Archers" was slaughtered in a bloodbath yesterday. Brandishing a gun taken from her father's collection, deranged divorcee Sheila Bamber, 28, first shot her twin six-year-old sons. She gunned down her father as he tried to phone for help. Then she murdered her mother before turning the automatic .22 rifle on herself.

The result of this certainty was that the investigation was poorly conducted. The murder scene was not secured or searched thoroughly, and evidence was not recorded or preserved. Within a couple of days, the police had burned the bloodstained bedding and carpets, apparently to spare Jeremy's feelings. The scenes-of-crime officer moved the murder weapon without wearing gloves, and it was not examined for fingerprints until weeks later. Three days after the killings, Bamber and the extended family were given back the keys to the house.

Police did not find the silencer in the cupboard. One of Jeremy's cousins found it on 10 August, with what appeared to be flecks of red paint and blood, and took it to another of the cousin's homes; it took the police a further three days to collect it. A few days after that, the cousins found a scratch on the red mantelpiece that the prosecution said was caused by the silencer during a struggle for the gun; that accounted for the fleck of red paint. The Bible found near Sheila was not examined at all. Journalist David Connett writes that a hacksaw blade that might have been used to gain entry to the house lay in the garden for months. Officers did not take contemporaneous notes; those who had dealt with Jeremy wrote down their statements weeks later. The bodies were released days after the murders, and three of them (Nevill, June and Sheila) were cremated. Jeremy's clothes were not examined until one month later. Ten years later, all blood samples were destroyed.

After Jeremy was convicted, the trial judge, Mr Justice Maurice Drake, expressed concern about the "less than thorough investigation", while The Times wrote about "blunders, omissions and ineptitude". Home Secretary Douglas Hurd requested a report on the investigation from Essex Chief Constable Robert Bunyard and in March 1989 issued a statement in the House of Commons: "It is clear that errors were made in the early stages of the police investigation contrary to existing force practice."

=== Funeral, Bamber's behaviour ===
External media

Images
- (left to right) Mugford, Bamber and Colin Caffell at the funeral of June, Nevill and Sheila, 16 August 1985.

Video
- Funeral service, Anglia Television, 16 August 1985.

The inquest into the murders was opened on 14 August 1985. The police gave evidence that the killings constituted a murder–suicide, and the bodies were released. Nevill, June and Sheila were cremated; the boys were buried. Jeremy's behaviour before and after the funeral increased suspicion among his family that he had been involved; they alleged that he sobbed during the funeral service for his parents and sister, and at one point seemed to buckle and had to be supported by Mugford, but that he was smiling and joking later at the wake.

Shortly after the funerals, Jeremy travelled to Amsterdam with Mugford and a friend, where he bought a large quantity of cannabis; the travel agent who sold the tickets said the group had been in high spirits. Jeremy also began selling his family's belongings; Mugford's mother was offered June's car and an ad was placed in a local newspaper asking £900 for Nevill's. Just after his first arrest and release in September, Jeremy tried to sell twenty nude photographs of Sheila for £20,000 to The Sun and went on another overseas trip with a friend, this time to Saint-Tropez.

=== Fingerprints on rifle ===
A print from Sheila's right ring finger was found on the right side of the butt of the rifle, pointing downwards. A print from Jeremy's right forefinger was on the rear end of the barrel, above the stock and pointing across the gun. He said he had used the gun to shoot rabbits. There were three other prints that could not be identified.

=== Silencer ===
The silencer was not on the gun when the bodies were discovered. It was found by one of Jeremy's cousins, three days after the murders, in the ground-floor office gun cupboard. Whether it was on the gun during the murders became a pivotal issue. The prosecution maintained that the silencer had indeed been on the gun, and that this meant Sheila could not have shot herself. Forensic tests indicated that her arms were not long enough to turn the gun on herself with the silencer attached. (Note: R v Bamber, [2002] EWCA Crim 2912, 79: "Exercises and tests conducted at the laboratory established that it would have been physically impossible for a woman of Sheila Caffell's height and reach to have operated the trigger and shot herself with the sound moderator attached to the weapon. She simply could not have reached it. Thus she could only have committed suicide if the sound moderator had been removed from the rifle.") If she had shot the others with the silencer, then realized the gun was too long for her to shoot herself, the silencer would have been found next to her body; she had no reason to return it to the gun cupboard before going back upstairs to shoot herself. If Sheila was not the killer, it meant Jeremy had lied about the telephone call from his father saying Sheila had "gone berserk" with the gun.

The police searched the gun cupboard on the day of the murders but found nothing. Three days later, on 10 August, Bamber's extended family visited the farm with Basil Cock, the estate's executor. During that visit, one of the cousins, David Boutflour, found the silencer and rifle sights in the gun cupboard. The court heard that this was witnessed by Boutflour's father and sister, as well as by Basil Cock and the farm secretary.

Instead of alerting the police, the family took the silencer to Boutflour's sister's home. Boutflour said it felt sticky. They found red paint and blood on the silencer, and its surface had been damaged. When the police collected the silencer on 12 August, five days after the murders, an officer reportedly noticed an inch-long grey hair attached to it, but this had disappeared by the time the silencer arrived at the Forensic Science Service (FSS) at Huntingdon, Cambridgeshire. A scientist at the FSS, John Hayward, found blood on the inside and outside surface of the silencer, the latter not enough to permit analysis. The blood inside was found to be the same blood group as Sheila's, although it could have been a mixture of Nevill's and June's. A firearms expert, Malcolm Fletcher, said the blood was backspatter caused by a close-contact shooting.

=== Scratch marks on mantelpiece ===
Jeremy's cousins returned to the farmhouse to search for the source of the red paint on the silencer. In the kitchen, they found marks in the red paint on the underside of the mantelpiece above an AGA cooker. A sample taken by a scenes-of-crime officer was found to contain the same fifteen layers of paint and varnish that were in the paint flake found on the silencer. Casts of the marks on the mantelpiece were deemed consistent with the silencer having come into contact with the mantel several times.

=== Julie Mugford's statements ===
==== Background ====
On 7 September 1985, a month after the murders, Mugford changed her statement to police, now alleging that Jeremy had been planning to kill his family. As a result of her second statement, he was arrested the following day.

Jeremy and Mugford had started dating in 1983, when she was aged 19 and studying for a degree in education at Goldsmiths College in London. She had taken a holiday job in Sloppy Joe's, a pizzeria in Colchester, where Jeremy had a bar job in the evenings. During police interviews, Mugford admitted to a brief background of dishonesty: in 1985, she had been cautioned for using a friend's chequebook after it had been reported stolen to obtain goods worth around £700; she said that she and the friend had repaid the money to the bank. Mugford also acknowledged having helped Jeremy, in March 1985, to steal just under £1,000 from the office of the Osea Road caravan site his family owned. She said that he had staged a break-in to make it appear that strangers were responsible.

==== Statements to police ====
Mugford was initially supportive of Jeremy. Photographs of his parents' and Sheila's funeral show him weeping and hanging onto her arm. During an interview with the police on the day after the murders, she said that Jeremy had telephoned her at home in the early hours of 7 August, between 3:00 and 3:30 am, and said, "There's something wrong at home," and sounded worried. She said she had been tired and had not asked what was wrong.

Mugford's position changed the following month after she'd had a series of rows with Jeremy. He seemed to want to end the relationship, and they had argued about his involvement in the murders. Mugford told Jeremy he was a psychopath and at one point tried to smother him with a pillow. During one argument on 4 September, another woman telephoned Jeremy in Mugford's presence. As it became clear to Mugford that he had been seeing the woman, she smashed a mirror and slapped him; he then twisted her arm up her back. Three days later, she went to the police and changed her statement.

In the second statement, Mugford alleged that between July and October 1984, Jeremy had said he wished he could "get rid of them all". He had talked disparagingly about his "old" father and "mad" mother, she claimed, who were trying to "run his life". Jeremy was also alleged to have said that his sister had nothing to live for and that the twins were disturbed. That the Bambers were paying for Sheila's expensive flat in Maida Vale annoyed him, she said.

In discussions she said she had dismissed as "idle talk", Jeremy had talked about sedating his parents with sleeping pills, shooting them, then setting fire to the farmhouse. He reportedly said Sheila would make a good scapegoat. Mugford alleged he had discussed cycling along the back roads to the house, entering through the kitchen window because the catch was broken, and leaving it via a different window that latched when it was shut from the outside. A telephone call would be made from White House Farm to his home in Goldhanger "because the last phone call made would be recorded". Jeremy claimed to have killed rats with his bare hands to test whether he was able to kill but he said it had taught him that he would not be able to kill his family, although he allegedly continued to talk about doing so.

==== "Tonight or never" allegation ====
Mugford said she had spent the weekend before the murders with Jeremy in his cottage in Goldhanger, where he had dyed his hair black. She had seen his mother's bicycle there, she said; the prosecution later alleged that he had used this bicycle to cycle between his cottage and White House Farm on the night of the murders to avoid being seen in his car on the road. Mugford told police that Jeremy had telephoned her at 9:50 pm on 6 August to say he had been thinking about the crime all day, was "pissed off", and that it was "tonight or never". A few hours later, at 3:00–3:30 am on 7 August, Mugford said he phoned her again to say: "Everything is going well. Something is wrong at the farm. I haven't had any sleep all night ... bye honey and I love you lots." Her flatmates' evidence suggested that call had come through closer to 3:00 am. Jeremy called later in the morning to tell Mugford that Sheila had gone mad and that a police car was coming to pick her up. When she arrived with the police at Jeremy's cottage, she said he had pulled her to one side and said: "I should have been an actor."

Later on the evening of 7 August, Mugford asked Jeremy whether he had done it. He said no, but that a friend of his had, whom he named; the man was a plumber the family had used in the past. Jeremy allegedly said he had told this friend how he could enter and leave the farmhouse undetected, and that one of his instructions had been for the friend to telephone him from one of the phones in the farmhouse that had a memory redial facility, so that if the police checked it he would have an alibi. Everything had gone as planned, he said, except that Nevill had put up a fight, and the friend had become angry and shot him seven times. The friend had allegedly told Sheila to lie down and shoot herself last, Jeremy said. The friend then placed the Bible on her chest so she appeared to have killed herself in a religious frenzy. The children were shot in their sleep, he said. Mugford said Jeremy claimed to have paid the friend £2,000.

==== Letter about Mugford ====
A letter dated 26 September 1985 from the assistant director of public prosecutions who prepared the case against Jeremy suggests that Mugford not be prosecuted for the burglary, the cheque fraud, and a further offence of selling cannabis. Mugford subsequently testified against Jeremy during his trial in October 1986. The judge told the jury that they could convict Jeremy on Mugford's testimony alone. Immediately after the verdict was announced, Mugford sold her story to the News of the World for £25,000 (equivalent to £75,000 in 2025).

=== Bamber's arrest ===
As a result of Mugford's statement, Jeremy was arrested on 8 September 1985, as was the friend Mugford said he had implicated, although the latter had a solid alibi and was released. Jeremy told police Mugford was lying because he had jilted her. He said he loved his parents and sister, and denied that they had kept him short of money; he claimed the only reason he had broken into the caravan site with Mugford was to prove that security was poor. He further claimed he had occasionally gained entry to the farmhouse through a downstairs window and had used a knife to move the catches from the outside. He also claimed he had seen his parents' wills, and that they had left the estate to be shared between him and Sheila. As for the rifle, Jeremy told police the gun was used mostly with the silencer off because it would otherwise not fit in its case.

Charged on 9 September with breaking into the Osea Bay caravan site on 25 March 1985 and stealing £980, Jeremy was released on bail on 13 September, after which he went on holiday to Saint-Tropez with a friend. Shortly before this, he tried to sell his life story and nude photographs of Sheila to The Sun newspaper for £20,000. Before leaving England, Jeremy said that he returned to the farmhouse, gaining entry by the downstairs bathroom window. He claimed he did this because he had left his keys in London and needed papers from the house for the trip to France; he entered through the window rather than borrow keys from the farm's housekeeper who lived nearby. When he returned to England on 29 September, Jeremy was arrested at Dover and charged with the murders.

== Trial, October 1986 ==
=== Prosecution case ===
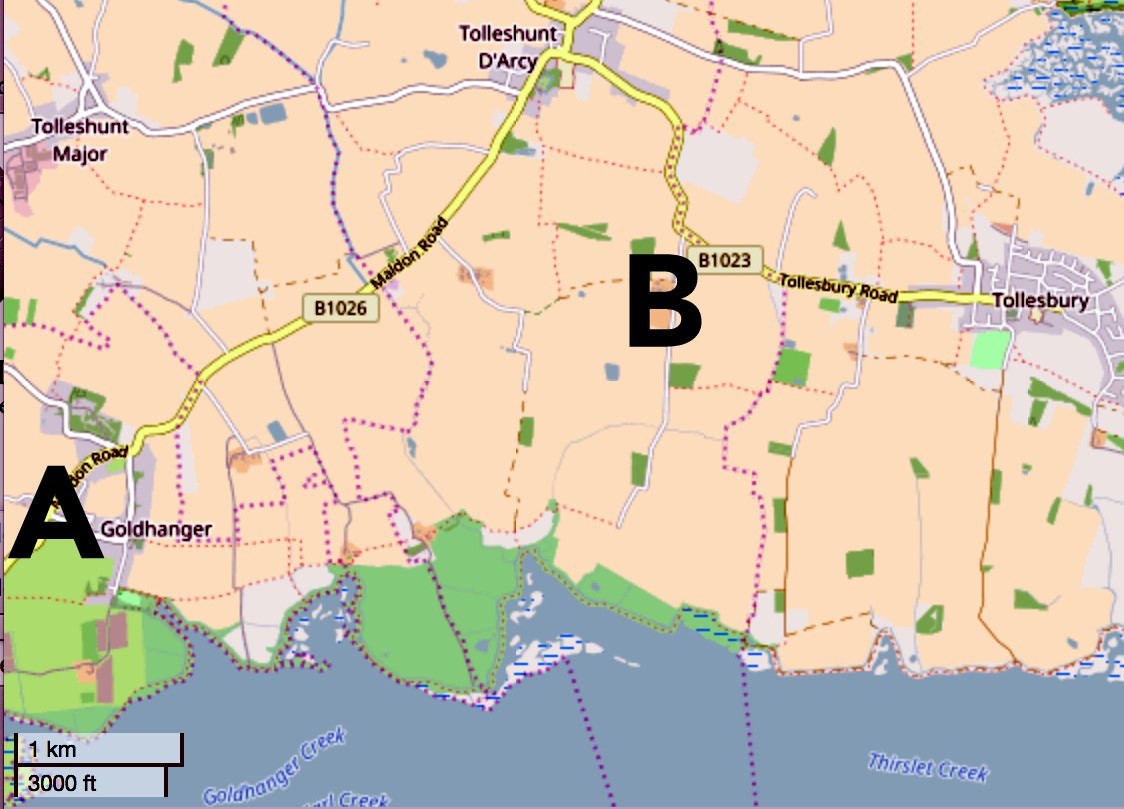
A: Jeremy Bamber's home in Head Street, Goldhanger 51.745857°N 0.755881°E B: White House Farm, Pages Lane, Tolleshunt D'Arcy. 51.7591°N 0.8032°E

Jeremy's trial, which lasted eighteen days, opened on 3 October 1986 before Mr Justice Drake and a jury of seven men and five women at Chelmsford Crown Court. The prosecution was led by Anthony Arlidge QC, and the defence by Geoffrey Rivlin QC, supported by Ed Lawson QC. The Times wrote that Jeremy cut an arrogant figure in the witness box. At one point, when prosecutors accused him of lying, he replied: "That is what you have got to establish."

The prosecution case was that Jeremy, motivated by hatred and greed, had left White House Farm around 10 pm on 6 August 1985, after dining with his family, to drive to his home in Goldhanger. Later, perhaps in the early hours of the morning of 7 August, he had returned to the farm on his mother's bicycle – which he had borrowed a few days earlier – cycling along a route that avoided the main roads and approaching the farmhouse from the back. He had entered the house through a downstairs bathroom window, taken the rifle with the silencer attached, and gone upstairs. He had shot June in her bed; she had managed to walk a few steps before collapsing and dying. He had shot Nevill in the bedroom too, but Nevill was able to get downstairs where he and Jeremy fought in the kitchen before Jeremy shot him four times, twice in his temple and twice in the top of his head. He had shot Sheila in the main bedroom, next to her mother, and had shot the children in their beds as they slept.

Jeremy had then arranged the scene to make it appear that Sheila was the killer, the prosecution argued. He discovered that she could not have reached the trigger with the silencer attached, so he removed it and returned it to the gun cupboard, then placed a Bible next to her body to introduce a religious theme. After removing the kitchen phone from its hook, he left the house via a kitchen window, perhaps after showering, and banged the window from the outside so that the catch dropped back into position. He had then cycled back to Goldhanger on his mother's bicycle. Shortly after 3 am, he had telephoned Mugford, then the police at 3:26 am to say he had just received a frantic call from his father. To create a delay before the bodies were discovered, he had not called 999, had driven slowly to the farmhouse, and had told police that his sister was familiar with guns so that they would be reluctant to enter.

The prosecution further argued that Jeremy had not received a telephone call from his father, that Nevill was too badly injured after the first shots to have spoken to anyone, that there was no blood on the kitchen phone that had been left off the hook, and that Nevill would have called the police before calling Jeremy. They also argued that, had Jeremy really received such a call, he would have dialled 999, alerted the farm workers, then made his way quickly to White House Farm himself.

The silencer played a central role in the prosecution's case. It was deemed to have been on the rifle when it was fired because of the blood found inside it. The prosecution said the blood had come from Sheila's head when the silencer was pointed at her. Had she discovered that she could not shoot herself with the silencer attached, the court heard, it would have been found next to her body; she had no reason to return it to the gun cupboard. That she had carried out the killings was further discounted because, it was argued, she had not recently expressed suicidal thoughts; the expert evidence was that she would not have harmed her children or father; she had no interest in or knowledge of guns; she lacked the strength to overcome her father; and there was no evidence on her clothes or body that she had moved around the crime scene or been involved in a struggle. In particular, her long fingernails had remained intact.

=== Defence case ===
The defence maintained that the witnesses who said Jeremy disliked his family were lying or had misinterpreted his words. Mugford had lied about his confession, they said, because he had betrayed her. No one had seen Jeremy cycle to and from the farm. There were no marks on him on the night in question that suggested he had been in a fight. No blood-stained clothing of his was recovered. He had not driven to the farm as quickly as he could have after his father telephoned because he was afraid, they said. There was no probative value in the finding of a hacksaw in the garden, because Jeremy had entered the house via the windows many times, before the killings and since.

The defence argued that Sheila was the killer and that she did know how to handle guns, having been raised on a farm and had attended shoots when she was younger. She had a very serious mental illness, had told a psychiatrist she felt capable of killing her children, and the loaded rifle and cartridges had been left on the kitchen table by Jeremy. There had been a recent family argument about placing her children in foster care. A former boyfriend of Sheila's gave a written statement to the court that she had had some kind of breakdown in March 1985, in his presence, when she began beating the wall with her fists because the telephone line had gone dead during a call; she had said the phone was bugged and talked about God and the devil, and how the latter loved her. This former boyfriend said he had feared for the safety of people around Sheila, who had a "deep and intense dislike" of June, her adoptive mother. The defence argued that people who have carried out so-called "altruistic" killings have been known to engage in ritualistic behaviour before killing themselves, and that Sheila might have placed the silencer in the cupboard, changed her clothes and washed herself, which would explain why there was little lead on her hands, or why sugar from the floor was not found on her feet. There was also a possibility that the blood in the silencer was not hers, but was a mixture of Nevill's and June's.

=== Summing up, verdict ===
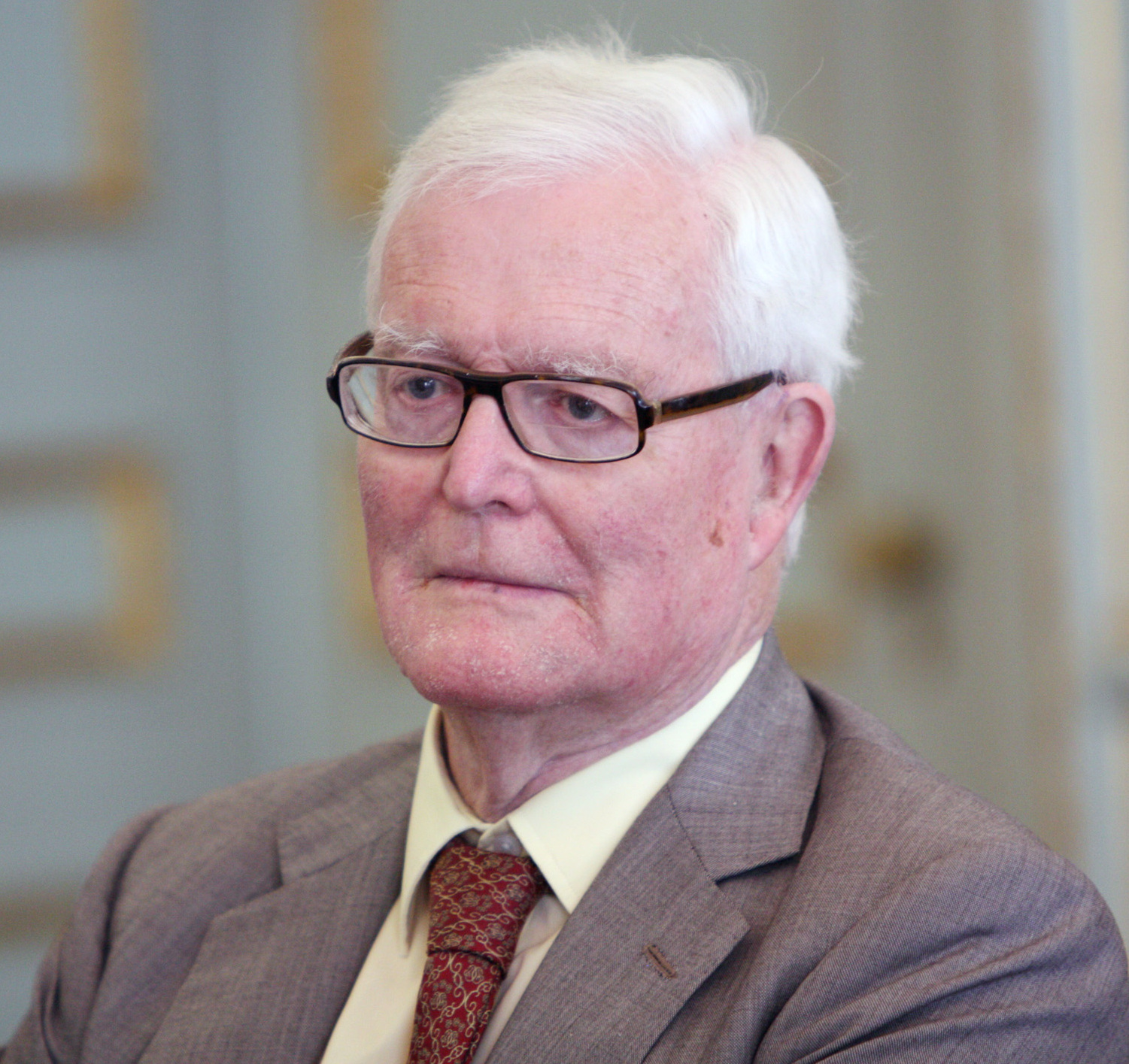
Home Secretary Douglas Hurd (pictured in 2013) decided in 1988 that Bamber should never be released.

The judge told the jury that there were three crucial points, in no particular order. Did they believe Mugford or Jeremy? Were they sure that Sheila was not the killer who then committed suicide? He said this question involved another: was the second, fatal, shot fired at Sheila with the silencer on? If yes, she could not have fired it. Finally, did Nevill call Jeremy in the middle of the night? If there was no such call, it undermined the entirety of Jeremy's story; the only reason he would have had to invent the phone call was that he was responsible for the murders.

On 28 October, after deliberating for more than nine hours, the jury found Jeremy guilty by a majority of 10–2 (the minimum required for conviction). Sentencing him to five life terms, with a recommendation that he serve a minimum of twenty-five years, the judge told Jeremy: "Your conduct in planning and carrying out the killing of five members of your family was evil, almost beyond belief." In December 1994, Home Secretary Michael Howard told Jeremy that he would remain in prison for the rest of his life, following a decision in 1988 by the Home Secretary of the day, Douglas Hurd.

== Appeals ==
=== Leave to appeal refused, 1989 and 1994 ===
Jeremy first sought leave to appeal in November 1986, arguing that the judge had misdirected the jury. The application was heard and refused by Mr Justice Caulfield in April 1988. During a full hearing in March 1989 before three Appeal Court judges—Lord Lane, the Lord Chief Justice; Mr Justice Roch; and Mr Justice Henry—Jeremy's lawyer, Geoffrey Rivlin QC, argued that the trial judge's summing up had been biased against his client, that his language had been too forceful, and that he had undermined the defence by advancing his own theory. Rivlin also argued that the defence had not pressed Mugford about her dealings with the media but should have, because as soon as the trial was over her story began to appear in newspapers. On 20 March 1989 the judges refused Jeremy leave to appeal, ruling that there was nothing unsafe or unsatisfactory about the verdicts.

Because the trial judge had criticized the police investigation, Essex Police held an internal inquiry. Jeremy alleged this report confirmed that evidence had been withheld by the police so he made a formal complaint, which was investigated in 1991 by the City of London Police. This investigation uncovered more material, which Jeremy used to petition the Home Secretary in September 1993 for a referral back to the Court of Appeal, refused in July 1994. During this process, the Home Office declined to give Jeremy the expert evidence it had obtained, so he applied for judicial review of their decision in November 1994, which resulted in the Home Office handing over the evidence. In 1996 a police officer destroyed many of the trial exhibits, saying later he had not been aware that the case was ongoing. Jeremy's defence team referred to the destruction of blood samples as a "disgrace".

=== Court of Appeal, 2002 ===
==== Criminal Cases Review Commission referral ====
In 1997 the Home Office passed Jeremy's case to the Criminal Cases Review Commission (CCRC), which had just been established to review alleged miscarriages of justice. In March 2001 the CCRC referred the case to the Court of Appeal because of the discovery of DNA inside the silencer; this was found as a result of a test not available in 1986 and constituted fresh evidence. Jeremy's conviction rested in part on evidence that Sheila's blood had been found inside the silencer, suggesting that it had been on the gun when she died; but her arms were not long enough to point the gun back at herself and pull the trigger with the silencer attached. The appeal was heard from 17 October to 1 November 2002, at the Royal Courts of Justice, by Lord Justice Kay, Mr Justice Wright and Mr Justice Henriques, who published their decision on 12 December 2002. The prosecution was represented by Victor Temple QC and Jeremy by Michael Turner QC. In a 522-paragraph judgment, the judges concluded that there was no conduct on the part of investigators that threatened the integrity of the trial, and that the more they examined the case, the more they thought the jury had been right.

==== Grounds ====
Jeremy initially brought sixteen issues to the attention of the court. Two (grounds 14 and 15) related to the silencer and DNA testing; the rest were about failure to disclose evidence or the fabrication of evidence. The defence withdrew ground 11 ("the proposed purchase of a Porsche by the appellant") before the hearing.

- Ground 1a – "hand swabs from Sheila Caffell"
- 1b – "the testing of the hand swabs from Sheila Caffell"
- 2 – "disturbance of the crime scene"
- 3 – "evidence relating to windows"
- 4 – "timing of phone call to Julie Mugford"
- 5 – "evidence relevant to the credibility of Julie Mugford"
- 6 – "letter from Colin Caffell"
- 7 – "the statement of Colin Caffell"
- 8 – "photograph showing carving of the words 'I hate this place'"
- 9 – "the Bible"
- 10 – "the question of inheritance"
- 11 – "the proposed purchase of a Porsche by the appellant"
- 12 – "the telephone in the office"
- 13 – "scars on the appellant's hands"
- 14 and 15 – "blood in the sound moderator"
- 15 – "DNA evidence"
- 16 – "police misconduct"

==== New silencer evidence ====
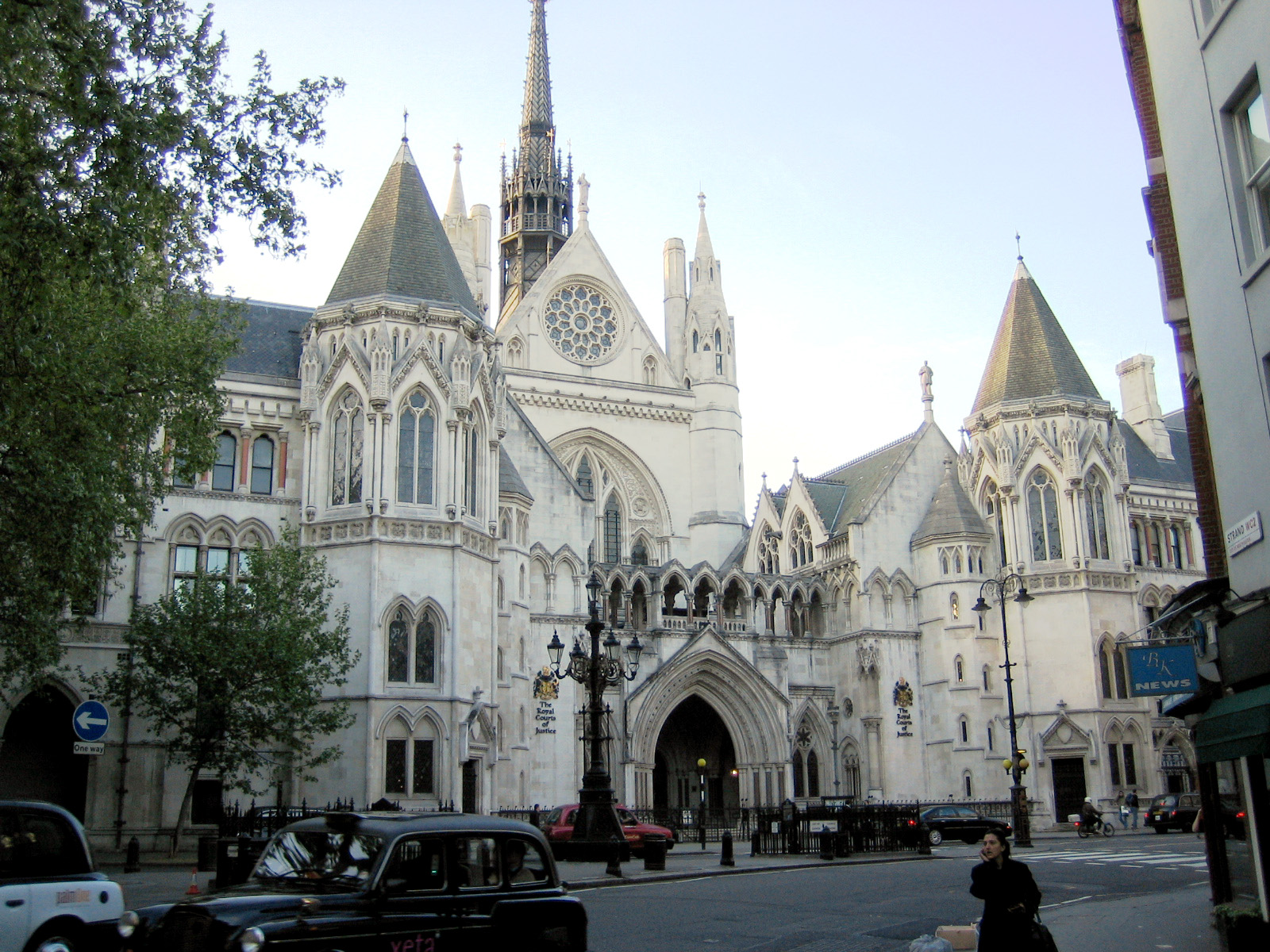
Bamber's appeal at the Royal Courts of Justice was dismissed in December 2002.

Although all the grounds (except 11) were reviewed by the court, the CCRC referred the case to the Court of Appeal on the basis of ground 15, the discovery of DNA on the silencer, the result of a test not available in 1986. The silencer evidence during the trial had come from John Hayward, a biologist in private practice, formerly of the FSS. He had found a "considerable amount of blood" inside the silencer; he had stated that it was human blood and that the blood group was consistent with it having come from Sheila. He said there was a "remote possibility" that it was a mixture of blood from Nevill and June.

Mark Webster, an expert instructed by Jeremy's defence team, argued that Hayward's tests had been inadequate and that there was a real possibility, not a remote one, that the blood had come from Nevill and June. This was a critical point, because the prosecution case rested on the silencer having been on the gun when Sheila was shot, something she could not have done herself because of the length of her arms. If she was shot with the silencer on the gun, it meant that someone else had shot her. If her blood was inside the silencer, it supported the prosecution's position that she had been shot by another party, but if the blood inside the silencer belonged to someone else, that part of the prosecution case collapsed.

The defence argued that new tests comparing DNA in the silencer to a sample from Sheila's biological mother suggested that the "major component" of the DNA in the silencer had not come from Sheila. A DNA sample from June's sister suggested that the major component had come from June, the defence argued. The court concluded that June's DNA was in the silencer, that Sheila's DNA may have been in the silencer, and that there was evidence of DNA from at least one male. The judges' conclusion was that the results were complex, incomplete, and also meaningless because they did not establish how June's DNA came to be in the silencer years after the trial, did not establish that Sheila's was not in it, and did not lead to a conclusion that Jeremy's conviction was unsafe.

=== Against whole-life tariff ===
In 2008, Jeremy lost a High Court appeal before Mr Justice Tugendhat against his whole-life tariff. This was upheld by the Court of Appeal in 2009. Jeremy and three other British whole-life prisoners appealed to the European Court of Human Rights, but the appeal was rejected in 2012. Jeremy and two of the prisoners (one of them the serial killer Peter Moore) appealed that decision, and in 2013, the European Court's Grand Chamber ruled that keeping the prisoners in jail with no prospect of release or review may not have been compatible with Article 3 of the European Convention on Human Rights, which prohibits inhuman and degrading treatment or punishment.

== Campaign ==
=== Background ===
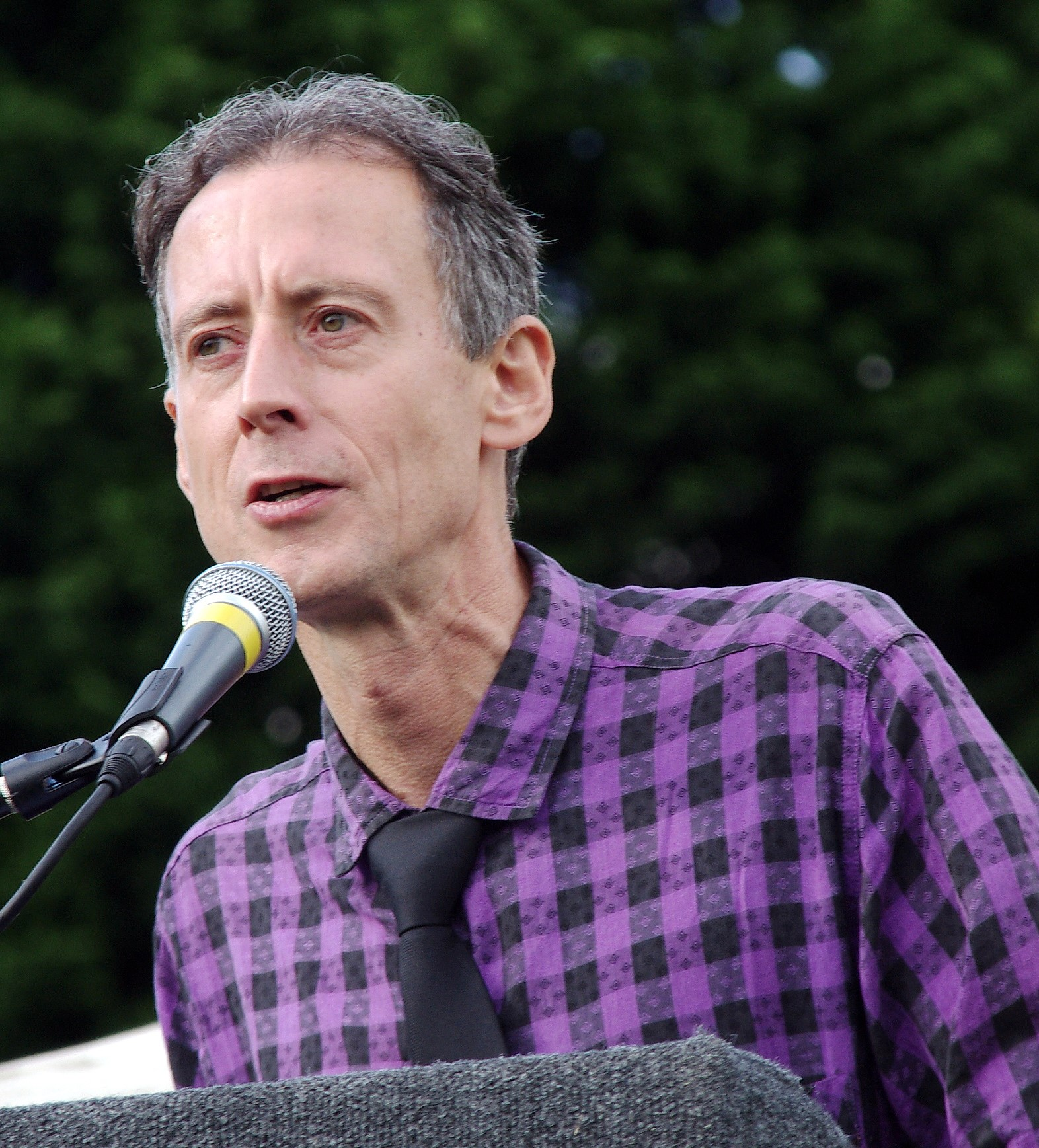
Peter Tatchell appealed in 2015 for all evidence related to the case to be released to the defence.

A campaign, known from November 2015 as JB Campaign Ltd, gathered pace over the years to secure Jeremy's release. The civil-liberties group Justice for All took up his case in 1993 to prepare for his appeal that year, and The Guardian ran a long investigative piece by Jim Shelley in November 1993 that included a telephone interview with Jeremy from HM Prison Long Lartin, Worcestershire; Jeremy said he still could not understand why he had been convicted. From March 2001, several websites were set up to discuss the evidence, and in 2002, Jeremy used one of the sites to offer a £1 million reward for evidence that would overturn his conviction. Campaign events included a supporter reading a letter from Jeremy to his parents at their graveside, and a "Bamber bake-off" featuring his mother's favourite recipes.

Jeremy's case was taken up by MPs George Galloway (Respect) and Andrew Hunter (DUP) and journalists Bob Woffinden and Eric Allison of The Guardian. Allison became one of the campaign's patrons. Woffinden argued between 2007 and 2011 that Sheila had shot her family, then watched as police gathered outside before shooting herself. He changed his mind in 2011 and said he believed Jeremy was guilty. In 2015, the human-rights campaigner Peter Tatchell appealed to the Chief Constable of Essex Police to disclose all evidence related to the case.

=== Campaign's arguments ===
==== Location of Sheila's body, time of death ====
The defence disputed the location of Sheila's body. The police said they had found her upstairs with her mother. According to early police logs, one officer reported seeing through a window what he thought was the body of a woman near the kitchen door, but he later radioed that it was a man. A retired police officer who worked on the case said in 2011 that the first police logs were simply mistaken in reporting that a woman's body had been found downstairs. Jeremy's lawyers argued that images of Sheila taken by a police photographer at around 9 am on 7 August 1985 showed that her blood was still wet. According to the defence team, had she been killed before 3:30 am, as the prosecution said, the blood would have congealed by 9 am. They argued that she was alive when Jeremy was standing outside the house with the police, shot herself in the kitchen just as the police entered, then ran up one of the staircases to the bedroom, where she shot herself again, this time fatally.

==== Alleged crime-scene damage ====
The defence argued that the first officers to enter the farmhouse had inadvertently disturbed the crime scene, then reconstructed it. Crime-scene photographs not made available to the original defence show Sheila's right arm and hand in slightly different positions in relation to the gun, which is lying across her body. The gun itself also appears to have moved. Former Detective Chief Superintendent Mick Gradwell of Lancashire Constabulary, shown the photographs by The Guardian, said in 2011: "The evidence shows, or portrays, Essex police having damaged the scene, and then having staged it again to make it look like it was originally. And if that has happened, and that hasn't been disclosed, that is really, really serious."

==== Arguments about the silencer ====
The contention that the gun had a silencer on it during the murders was central to the prosecution's case; Jeremy and his lawyers have sought since 1987 to discredit the silencer evidence. With the silencer fitted, the gun was too long for Sheila to have turned it on herself. According to the prosecution, paint on the silencer could be matched to fresh scratch marks on the kitchen mantelpiece, assumed to have been made during a fight for the gun. That the silencer was found in the gun cupboard was important to the prosecution, because Sheila had no reason to return it to the cupboard before killing herself. But that it was found by one of the cousins who inherited part of the estate—days after the police had searched the house—blighted the prosecution's case, although it was accepted by a majority of the jury. (Note: According to Carol Ann Lee, in her book The Murders at White House Farm (2015), Jeremy said in April 1987 that DCI Jones had found the silencer under a bed on 7 August 1985, the day of the murders, and had placed it in the gun cupboard for safekeeping. Jeremy claimed to have seen a statement from Jones to that effect. The Essex police called this "total nonsense" in a letter to the Crown Prosecution Service, and Bamber was never able to produce the statement.)

Lee writes that the silencer evidence became confused because of the way the exhibit was named. It was first called "SBJ/1", because it was handed over by Detective Sergeant Stan Jones (SBJ). When it was learned that David Boutflour had found it, the silencer was renamed exhibit "DB/1". But because there was a Detective Constable David Bird, it was renamed again to "DRB/1". The name changes led to confusion in later documents, giving the impression that more than one silencer had been found. In 2011, Lee writes, Jeremy's blog announced: "We can now prove 100% that there were two sound moderators obtained by police at different times." The CCRC responded that year that the claims were "not supported by the material that exists". Again in 2013 Jeremy's blog said: "I can now prove with 100% certainty that Essex police seized one Parker Hale (MM1 type) suppressor from the house on 7 August 1985" (the day of the murder, rather than the day the cousin found it). According to The Times in 2013, he aimed to show that the police had taken four silencers from his family members, including the one in the cupboard, and that evidence and paperwork from them—and from an additional laboratory silencer—had been mixed up.

In or around 2012, Jeremy's lawyers commissioned gun experts from the US and UK to examine photographs of the bodies and the silencer evidence. (Note: The experts were David Fowler, chief medical examiner for the US state of Maryland; Ljubisa Dragovic, chief medical examiner of Oakland County, Michigan; Marcella Fierro, former chief medical examiner for the US state of Virginia; Daniel Caruso, chief of burn services at the Arizona Burn Center; and John Manlove, a British forensic scientist.) They argued that injuries on the bodies were consistent with the silencer not having been used, and that its absence would explain burn marks on Nevill's body. The court had heard that "three circular burn type marks" had been found on Nevill's back. In November 1985 a police report submitted to the Director of Public Prosecutions had argued that the burn marks were made with the hot end of the gun or with a poker from the AGA cooker.

==== Arguments about scratch marks ====
The defence commissioned a report from Peter Sutherst, a British forensic photographic expert, who was asked in 2008 to examine negatives of the kitchen taken on the day of the murders and later. In his report, dated 17 January 2010, Sutherst argued that the scratch marks in the red paintwork on the kitchen mantelpiece had been created after the crime-scene photographs had been taken. The prosecution alleged that the marks had been made during the struggle in the kitchen between Bamber and his father, as the silencer, attached to the rifle, had scratched against the mantelpiece. The prosecution said that paint chips identical to the paint on the mantelpiece had been found on or inside the silencer. Sutherst said the scratch marks appeared in photographs taken on 10 September 1985, 34 days after the murders, but were not visible in the original crime-scene photographs. He also said he had failed to find in the photographs any chipped paint on the carpet below the mantelpiece, where it might have been expected to fall had the mantelpiece been scratched during a struggle. Sutherst was asked by the CCRC to examine a red spot on the carpet visible in photographs underneath the scratches on the mantelpiece. He said the red spot matched a piece of nail varnish missing from one of Sheila's toes. Sutherst concluded that the scratch marks on the mantel had been created after the day of the murders.

==== Arguments about police logs ====
Police telephone logs had been entered as evidence during the trial, but had not been noticed by Jeremy's lawyers. Jeremy's new defence team based their new CCRC submissions in part on these logs, particularly on the radio log that, they say, shows Nevill called police that night to say his daughter had "gone berserk" with one of his guns. A separate log of a police radio message shows there was an attempt to speak to someone inside the farmhouse that night, as police waited outside to enter, but there was no response. Police say the officers simply made a mistake.

==== Arguments about Mugford letter ====
Jeremy's lawyers argued that the 26 September 1985 letter to Mugford from John Walker, assistant director of public prosecutions, raised the possibility that she had been persuaded to testify in the hope that charges against her would not be pursued. In the letter, Walker had suggested to the Chief Constable of Essex Police, "with considerable hesitation", that Mugford not be prosecuted for drug offences, burglary and cheque fraud, offences to which she had confessed during her police interviews regarding Bamber. The defence team also highlighted that, as soon as the verdict was announced, Mugford sold her story to the News of the World for £25,000 (equivalent to £74,671 in 2025).

== Criminal Cases Review Commission ==
In 2004, Jeremy's defence team, which included Giovanni di Stefano, applied unsuccessfully to have the CCRC refer the case back to the Court of Appeal. His lawyers made a fresh submission to the CCRC in 2009. The CCRC provisionally rejected Jeremy's 2009 submission in February 2011 in an 89-page document. It invited his lawyers to respond within three months, extended the deadline to allow them to study all 406 crime-scene photographs, and, in September 2011, granted them an indefinite period in which to pursue an additional line of inquiry.

The CCRC finally rejected the application in April 2012 in a 109-page report, which said the submission had not identified any new evidence or legal argument that would raise the real possibility of the Court of Appeal overturning the conviction. In November 2012, the High Court turned down Bamber's application for a judicial review of that decision. The next year, di Stefano was sentenced in the UK to 14 years in prison for having fraudulently presented himself as a lawyer. As of December 2013, Jeremy's defence team was said to be preparing a fresh submission.

On 10 March 2021, a new application was lodged with the CCRC for a referral to the Court of Appeal. The submissions contained new evidence not previously considered by the Courts and based on 350,000 documents released to Bamber and his legal team in 2011 after the expiry of a Public Interest Immunity order. Initially, eight issues, each containing multiple grounds of appeal, were lodged, with another two added before the end of the year. In October 2022 it was reported that Bamber's legal team, led by his Solicitor Advocate, had sent the CCRC ten new items of evidence, which they claimed cast doubt on the prosecution's contention that the silencer was used in the murders.

In May 2023, the Independent Office for Police Conduct ruled that Essex Police breached its statutory duty by not referring 29 serious complaints to the IOPC about how senior officers handled the case.

It was reported in November 2024 that Bamber's conviction was among 1,200 being reviewed by the CCRC in the aftermath of the Andrew Malkinson scandal.

In July 2025, the CCRC announced that they had reviewed four of Bamber's ten grounds for appeal and had decided they should not be referred to the court of appeal. The other six grounds remained under review.

== In popular media ==
The case became the subject of a television drama series, White House Farm, starring Freddie Fox as Bamber and Cressida Bonas as Sheila, broadcast in January 2020 on ITV in the UK and HBO Max in the United States. In 2021, documentary maker Louis Theroux produced a four-part series for Sky Crime on the murders, titled The Bambers: Murder At The Farm. Theroux told the Radio Times that the series had to be extended from an initial three-episode format due to the complexities of the case, and told Sky News that "both scenarios have anomalies".

Podcasts about the murders have been produced by The New Yorker and by HBOMax and iHeart Podcasts.

== See also ==
- White House Farm (TV series)
- Bain family murders
- List of rampage killers (familicides in Europe)

== Sources ==
=== Works cited ===
Most news reports are cited above only.

Books and long-form journalism

- Allison, Eric; O'Kane, Maggie; Grandjean, Guy; et al. (30 January 2011). "Jeremy Bamber: Will new evidence bring historic third appeal? – video". The Guardian. Archived from the original on 28 December 2016.
- Caffell, Colin (1994). In Search of the Rainbow's End: The Inside Story of the Bamber Murders. London: Hodder & Stoughton Ltd. ISBN 9781529309171.
- Lee, Carol Ann (2015). The Murders at White House Farm. London: Sidgwick & Jackson. ISBN 9781447285755.
- Lomax, Scott (2008). Jeremy Bamber: Evil, Almost Beyond Belief?. Stroud: The History Press. ISBN 9780750950626.
- Powell, Claire (1994). Murder at White House Farm. London: Headline Book Publishing.
- Smith, David James (11 July 2010). "And by dawn they were all dead" (PDF). The Sunday Times Magazine. pp. 18–22. Archived (PDF) from the original on 10 March 2012.
- Wilkes, Roger (1994). Blood Relations: Jeremy Bamber and the White House Farm Murders. London: Robinson Publishing.

Legal cases

- R v Bamber (12 December 2002). [2002] EWHC Crim 2912. Case No: 20011745 S1.
- R v Bamber (16 May 2008). [2008] EWHC 862 (QB). Case No: 2005/52/MTR.
- R v Bamber (14 May 2009). [2009] EWCA Crim 962. Case No: 2008/03986/A5.
