= White House Farm (TV series) =

British crime drama TV series

- DVD cover
- Genre: True crime; Drama
- Written by: Kris Mrksa; Giula Sandler
- Directed by: Paul Whittington
- Starring: Freddie Fox; Mark Addy; Gemma Whelan; Mark Stanley; Alexa Davies; Cressida Bonas; Amanda Burton; Nicholas Farrell; Stephen Graham; Alfie Allen
- Music by: Niall Byrne
- Country of origin: United Kingdom
- Original language: English
- No. of episodes: 6

Production
- Executive producers: Willow Grylls; Kris Mrksa; Charlie Pattinson; Elaine Pyke
- Producer: Lee Thomas
- Production company: New Pictures

Original release
- Network: ITV
- Release: 8 January – 12 February 2020

White House Farm (broadcast in some countries under the titles White House Farm Murders and The Murders at White House Farm) is a British television crime drama based on the real-life events that took place in August 1985.

The series was produced by New Pictures for ITV and distributed worldwide by All3Media. It was broadcast by ITV on 8 January 2020.

== Premise ==
The series is based on true events from 6 August 1985, when five members of the Bamber-Caffell family are shot to death at White House Farm, Essex. The police, led by detectives DCI Taff Jones and DS Stan Jones, are called in to investigate.

During police questioning, the Bambers' son Jeremy Bamber claims that his sister, Sheila, who was suffering from schizophrenia, went "berserk", got hold of a silenced rifle and killed their parents and Sheila's six-year old twin sons. As the murder case unravels, a devastating truth comes to light.

== Cast ==
- Stephen Graham as DCI Taff Jones
- Freddie Fox as Jeremy Bamber
- Cressida Bonas as Sheila Caffell
- Mark Addy as DS Stan Jones
- Gemma Whelan as Ann Eaton
- Mark Stanley as Colin Caffell
- Alexa Davies as Julie Mugford
- Alfie Allen as Brett Collins
- Millie Brady as Sally Jones
- Amanda Burton as June Bamber
- Nicholas Farrell as Nevill Bamber
- Scott Reid as DC Mick Clark
- Grace Calder as Heather Amos
- Oliver Dimsdale as Peter Eaton
- Richard Goulding as David Boutflour

== Episodes ==
No.	Title	Directed by	Written by	Original release date	UK viewers (millions)
1	"Episode 1"	Paul Whittington	Kris Mrksa	8 January 2020	7.99
A worried Jeremy Bamber calls the police on the night of 7 August 1985, expressing worries about his sister Sheila, and that something might have happened at the parents’ house. Flashbacks to four nights before, reveals that he had invited her ex-husband Colin Caffell to a party, something she felt uncertain about. The day after, Colin, Sheila and her twin sons Daniel and Nicholas, visit her parents, Nevill and June, at White House Farm, where they will be staying for the holidays. After standing up for Daniel, Colin is asked by Sheila if he can convince her mother to not give her an injection. The night of the murders, the police discover the entire family shot and killed. Initially the police are under the assumption that Sheila committed the murders and killed herself, but DS Stan Jones discovers two gun shot wounds on Sheila, making him suspect that she might not have committed the murders herself.
2	"Episode 2"	Paul Whittington	Kris Mrksa	15 January 2020	7.89
Stan and his partner Mick Clark speak to Jeremy Bamber and relatives of the murdered family, but their picture of what really happened that night at White House Farm remains inconclusive. The coroner’s conclusions support Taff’s conclusion about the murder despite Stan’s earlier suspicions. Ann Eaton shares the same doubts as Stan and talks to Taff with her brother, but Taff discredits her and angrily orders them to leave his office. He again lashes out at Stan for his presence at the crime scene with Clark and the coroner. He later questions Sheila’s friend, Frankie Bidiwi, with Stan. Bidiwi confirms Sheila’s violent behaviour, also implying that she might have molested her sons. Eaton discovers a broken window latch, which she shows Stan, concluding that only someone who knew the house well, lived or grew up there, would have known about it.
3	"Episode 3"	Paul Whittington	Giula Sandler	22 January 2020	7.79
Eaton discovers a silencer at the Bamber residence. Stan presents the evidence to Taff, who although skeptical, reluctantly allows it to be analysed. He also accepts Stan’s recommendation to question Jeremy again, but is left unconvinced afterwards. Tensions rise between Jeremy and his girlfriend Julie Mugford, when a New Zealand friend of his, Brett Collins, arrives. Julie suspects Brett of being gay, which Jeremy seems unconcerned about. Eaton, her husband and David Boutflour collect valuables from the Bamber residence, which Jeremy becomes agitated about; a scorned Eaton soon accuses him of having murdered his family before leaving and having a nervous breakdown in front of her daughter. Stan speaks to Nevill’s secretary, Barbara Wilson, who reveals that both Sheila and Jeremy were troublesome as children, and that he had stopped a purchase of land by Eaton and her husband, which she became furious over. Stan and Clark deduces that Sheila couldn’t have shot herself with the silencer on, but are too late to prevent the bodies from being handed over to Jeremy for cremation.
4	"Episode 4"	Paul Whittington	Kris Mrksa	29 January 2020	8.27
The funerals approach, and without the answers he needs and still more questions being thrown up from White House Farm, Stan's efforts remain fruitless. Taff advises him to take his one month vacation, which he reluctantly does, and Clark promises to keep investigating. James Carr reveals to them that the rumour has it that Bamber was dealing drugs, but he cannot present them evidence of it, which Stan decides to ignore. Eaton’s brother David tries to convince Colin that Jeremy is the killer, but fails. Julie grows frustrated with Jeremy’s flirting with another woman, leading to an argument when they are packing in Sheila’s London apartment. Colin arrives to assist him instead, and is left disgusted when Jeremy mocks Sheila’s sensitive pictures. Eaton learns from Carr that the police in Essex agree with the findings and deem the case closed. Clark calls Stan away from his holiday, when Julie arrives at the station, wanting to tell them what really happened the night of the murders.
5	"Episode 5"	Paul Whittington	Giulia Sandler	5 February 2020	8.20
Julie recounts how Jeremy as early as 1984 mentioned that he wanted to get rid of his parents and take over their inheritance. She further explains how he had subtly given hints that he was going ahead with getting rid of them, but she never took him seriously. Come the night of 6 August, he tells her how his plan has succeeded and to expect the police come morning. She also mentions that he hired Marcus McBride to kill his family. Taff orders both Jeremy and McBride to be arrested. Jeremy denies Julie’s recollection, but does admit to the theft at the family camping site. McBride turns out to have a solid alibi for the night of the murders. Colin is informed about Jeremy’s arrest, and expresses disbelief for having believed him. Jeremy attempts to release the pornographic pictures of Sheila, but the papers turn on him and portray the case as a photo scandal. The regional police commissioner summons all the detectives on the Bamber case and asks their opinion of who committed the murders. All except Taff suspect Jeremy, and the commissioner puts CS Mike Ainsley in charge of the investigation. Meanwhile, Jeremy and Brett flee the country by ferry.
6	"Episode 6"	Paul Whittington	Kris Mrksa	12 February 2020	8.67
The police search and restudy the crime scene for clues that could prove that Jeremy committed the murders. The evidence they discover is enough for them to arrest Jeremy upon his return from Saint Tropez. During multiple rounds of questioning, Jeremy’s current and prior statements contradict each other, in addition to him painting Julie as a liar. Taff takes leave and still believes Sheila committed the murders. The trial starts on 2 October 1986, where Julie testifies. The defence attempts to discredit Julie, causing her to break down for a short second. Colin testifies regarding Sheila, describing her as a kind and caring mother despite a bad temper. The prosecution brings up evidence to the contrary of Jeremy’s claims and statements, portraying him as the killer if nothing else can be proven. Jeremy attempts to portray Julie as a manipulator, and Sheila of being violent and having abused Nicholas and Daniel. The jury doesn’t manage to reach a verdict at first, but later agrees and finds Jeremy guilty of the murders. Soon after, he is sentenced to life imprisonment.

== Production and release ==
The series was first reported on in August 2018, when filming had begun. Stephen Graham, Freddie Fox, Cressida Bonas and Alexa Davies were announced as the main cast. Further details of the show were revealed by ITV in October 2019, and a release was scheduled for early 2020. The trailer was released in December 2019, and the series began airing on ITV on 8 January 2020. It was released on DVD in February 2020.

=== International release ===
International distribution of the series was handled by All3Media. In November 2019, HBO Max closed a deal to air the series on their service in the United States; it was released in September 2020 under the title The Murders at White House Farm. The series was also aired in the Netherlands in June 2020 by the Dutch broadcaster KRO-NCRV, adding the word "Murders" to the series' title.

=== Filming locations ===
The house we used to depict the house at White House Farm was key. Firstly for its setting in rural Essex, its isolation and beauty. Also crucially what ultimately tipped the balance for us in terms of that particular location was the interior layout of that house which was very similar to the original house itself.

— Paul Whittington, director

The real-life murders took place in the village of Tolleshunt D'Arcy. No scenes in White House Farm were filmed there; instead, the producers chose other locations to replicate the area. The scenes of Jeremy Bamber's trial were filmed in the same courthouse that the real-life trial took place in, Chelmsford Crown Court.

== Reception ==
On the review aggregation website Rotten Tomatoes, White House Farm holds an approval rating of 82%, based on 17 reviews. On Metacritic, which assigns a weighted average score out of 100 to reviews from mainstream critics, the film received an average score of 58 based on 4 reviews, indicating a "mixed or average" response.

Stephen Graham's portrayal of Welsh detective "Taff" Jones drew some criticism, with a number of pundits, including Carolyn Hitt of WalesOnline, stating that his Welsh accent was inauthentic. Some online commentators described the accent as the "worst screen accent since Dick Van Dyke".

== Spin-off podcast ==
On 18 September 2020 an official companion podcast produced by iHeartRadio was announced via a trailer published across all podcasting platforms, with the first episode premiering on 24 September 2020 alongside the release of the series on HBO Max.

Hosted by producer Lauren Bright Pacheco, the podcast features conversations with the creators of the series, experts on the case, and family members of the deceased to "provide context to what’s happening on screen as well as extended audio clips to further immerse the listener in the world of the show."
