= Chelmsford Crown Court =

Judicial building in Chelmsford, England

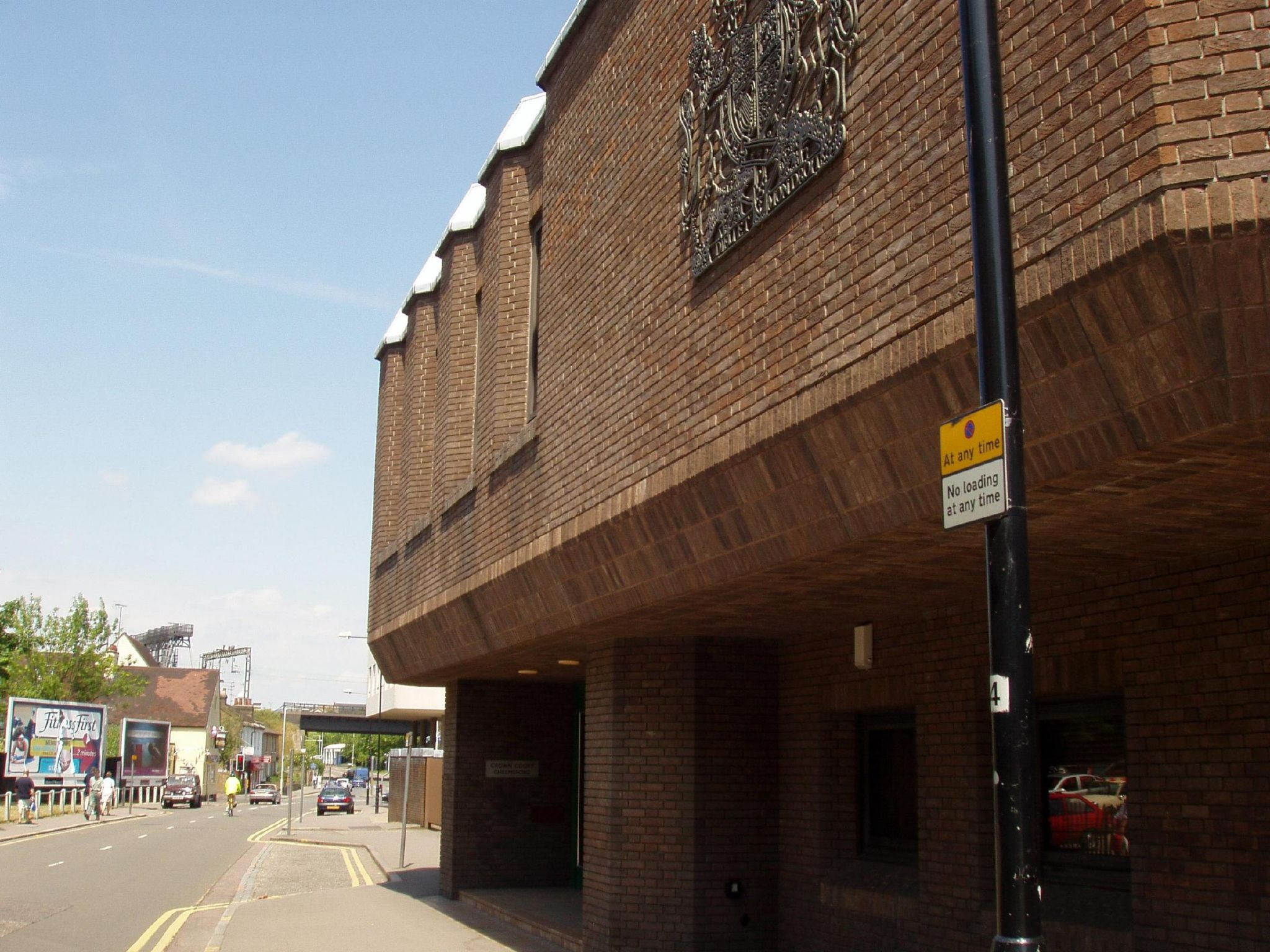
- Chelmsford Crown Court

- Shown in Essex
- 51.7360°N 0.4738°E
- Location: New Street, Chelmsford

History
- Built: 1982

Site notes
- Architect: Property Services Agency
- Architectural style: Modernist style

Chemsford Crown Court is a Crown Court venue, which deals with criminal cases, in New Street, Chelmsford, England.

== History ==
Until the early 1980s, all criminal court hearings in Chelmsford were held in the Shire Hall on the north side of Tindal Square. However, as the number of court cases in Chelmsford grew, it became necessary to commission a more modern courthouse for criminal matters: the site selected by the Lord Chancellor's Department had been occupied by a residential area known as Marriages Square, which had dated back at least to the early 19th century, but which was cleared away in 1953.

The new building was designed by the Property Services Agency in the Modernist style, built in brown brick at a cost of £5.6 million, and was completed in 1982. The design involved an asymmetrical main frontage facing onto New Street. The central section, which was projected forward, featured five glass doors on the left hand side; on the first floor the central section was cantilevered out over the pavement, with four recessed casement windows on the left and a Royal coat of arms on the right. The wings were irregularly fenestrated on both floors and, on the first floor, there were a series of recesses some of which contained casement windows and some of which were blind. Internally, the building was laid out to accommodate seven courtrooms.

Notable cases have included the trial and conviction of Jeremy Bamber, in October 1986, for the murder of his parents, Nevill and June Bamber, their adopted daughter, Sheila Caffell, and Sheila's six-year-old twin sons, Daniel and Nicholas Caffell at White House Farm. The television series White House Farm, which dramatised the story of the murders, was also filmed in the courthouse. The court was also the venue for the trial and conviction of the serial killer, Peter Tobin, in December 2009, for the murder of Dinah McNicol.
