= Scott Lomax =

Scott Lomax (born 1982) is a British campaigner and true crime author who wrote about the case of the convicted murderer Jeremy Bamber, and also about the innocence of Barry George who was acquitted of the murder of Jill Dando on 1 August 2008 after a retrial ordered by the Court of Appeal. He is author of a number of books and articles, the most notable being Who Killed Jill Dando?, Justice for Jill and Jeremy Bamber, Evil, Almost Beyond Belief?

Lomax has written stories, articles and books since the age of 8. His work concentrates on issues of justice and he claimed his desire to fight for justice came from a conversation with his grandfather.

== Campaigns ==
Lomax is a human rights campaigner, having helped successfully campaign for the release of two men wrongly convicted of conspiring to commit armed robbery. Lomax ran the campaign for one of the men; James (Shay) Power. Lomax also helped run the Justice for Barry campaign to free Barry George.

One of Lomax's cases was that of James Harry Reyos, an American Indian convicted of killing an Irish Priest in Texas, USA. Father Patrick Ryan was killed in Odessa, Texas, on 21 December 1981 and Reyos was found guilty two years later. Lomax helped run the campaign to exonerate Reyos.

In addition to working on cases of alleged injustices, Lomax wrote about unsolved murders in Derbyshire, published in the autumn of 2009 and South Yorkshire, published in February 2013. In later years he wrote books about the archaeology of Nottingham (2013) and the home front in Sheffield and Derbyshire during the First World War.

Lomax campaigned for tougher sentences for serious crimes such as paedophilia, rape, and murder. He also campaigned for Peter Sutcliffe (the Yorkshire Ripper) to be moved from Broadmoor secure hospital, to a prison.

In 2009 Lomax made an appeal bid to have the sentences of Dano Sonnex and Nigel Farmer (convicted of murdering two French students in London) increased to whole life tariffs. His attempts to persuade the Attorney General to refer the case to the Court of Appeal on the grounds that the sentences were unduly lenient were unsuccessful, however.

== Education ==
Lomax lives in Derbyshire and was an archaeologist, writing in his spare time. He graduated from the University of Sheffield in 2004 with a degree in Archaeology and Prehistory. He advocates a dual-disciplinary approach to urban studies, examining both archaeological and documentary evidence.

== Bibliography ==
- The Home Front: Derbyshire in the First World War
- The Home Front: Sheffield in the First World War
- Nottingham: The Buried Past of a Historic City Revealed
- Unsolved Murders in South Yorkshire
- Deadly Derbyshire
- Unsolved Murders in and Around Derbyshire
- Jeremy Bamber: Evil, Almost Beyond Belief?
- Justice for Jill
- Who Killed Jill Dando? (ISBN 0-7552-0503-0)
- The Case of Barry George (ISBN 0-7552-0500-6)
- Particle of Doubt a chapter in CSI, edited by Roger Wilkes
