= Queen's Head, Tolleshunt D'Arcy =

Pub in Tolleshunt D'Arcy, Essex, England

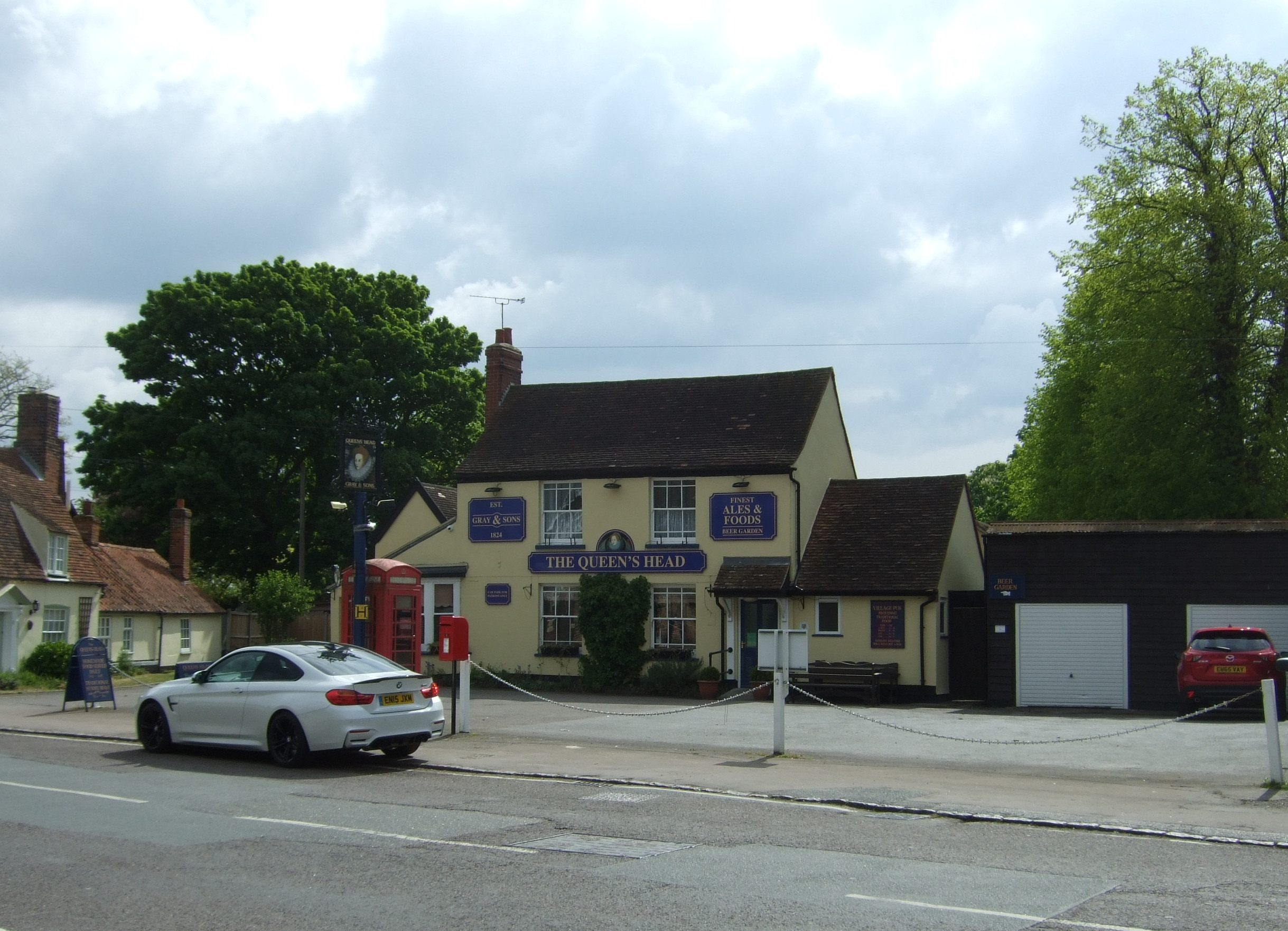
- Interactive map of the Queen's Head, Tolleshunt D'Arcy area

General information
- Location: Tolleshunt D'Arcy, Essex
- Coordinates: 51°46′23.63″N 0°47′45.96″E

The Queen's Head is a public house at The Square, Tolleshunt D'Arcy, Essex. It has been there since at least 1899.

It is on the Campaign for Real Ale's National Inventory of Historic Pub Interiors.

There is a listed phone box in the forecourt.
