= Goldhanger =

Village in Essex, England

Coordinates: 51.7455°N 0.7581°E

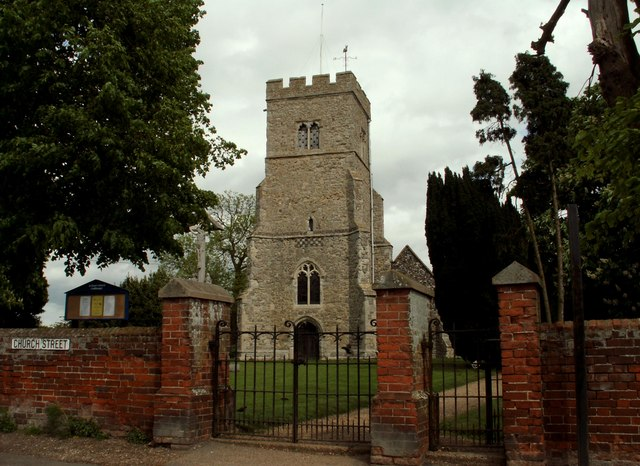

- Location within Essex
- Population: 751 (Parish, 2021)
- Civil parish: Goldhanger
- District: Maldon
- Shire county: Essex
- Region: East
- Country: England
- Sovereign state: United Kingdom
- Post town: Maldon
- Postcode district: CM9
- Dialling code: 01621
- Police: Essex
- Fire: Essex
- Ambulance: East of England
- UK Parliament: Witham

Goldhanger is a village and a civil parish on the B1026 road in the Maldon District, in the county of Essex, England. At the 2021 census the parish had a population of 751.

Goldhanger had an agricultural museum and has a church dedicated to St Peter. Goldhanger is at the head of a short creek, on the north side of the estuary of the River Blackwater, 4 miles (6.4 km) east northeast of the town of Maldon.

There are eight roads in Goldhanger: Head Street, Fish Street, Church Street, St Peter's Close, Maldon Road, Hall Estate, Sorrell Close, and finally Blind Lane.

The village is directly between Maldon and Tolleshunt D'Arcy and also has direct passage to the River Blackwater.

The place-name Goldhanger is first attested in the Domesday Book of 1086, where it appears as Goldhangra. The name means 'slope where marigold grew', from the Old English golde meaning marigold.

== Notable people ==
- John Christopher Atkinson (1814–1900), writer and antiquary
- Jeremy Bamber (b. 1961), farmer, convicted of the White House Farm murders, lived in Goldhanger
