= Anthony Arlidge =

British barrister and judge (1937–2023)

Anthony Arlidge, KC (18 February 1937 – 27 January 2023) was a British barrister, known for his role in the Jeremy Bamber trial.
