= Tolleshunt D'Arcy =

Village in Essex, England

Coordinates: 51°46′18″N 00°47′42″E

- Village
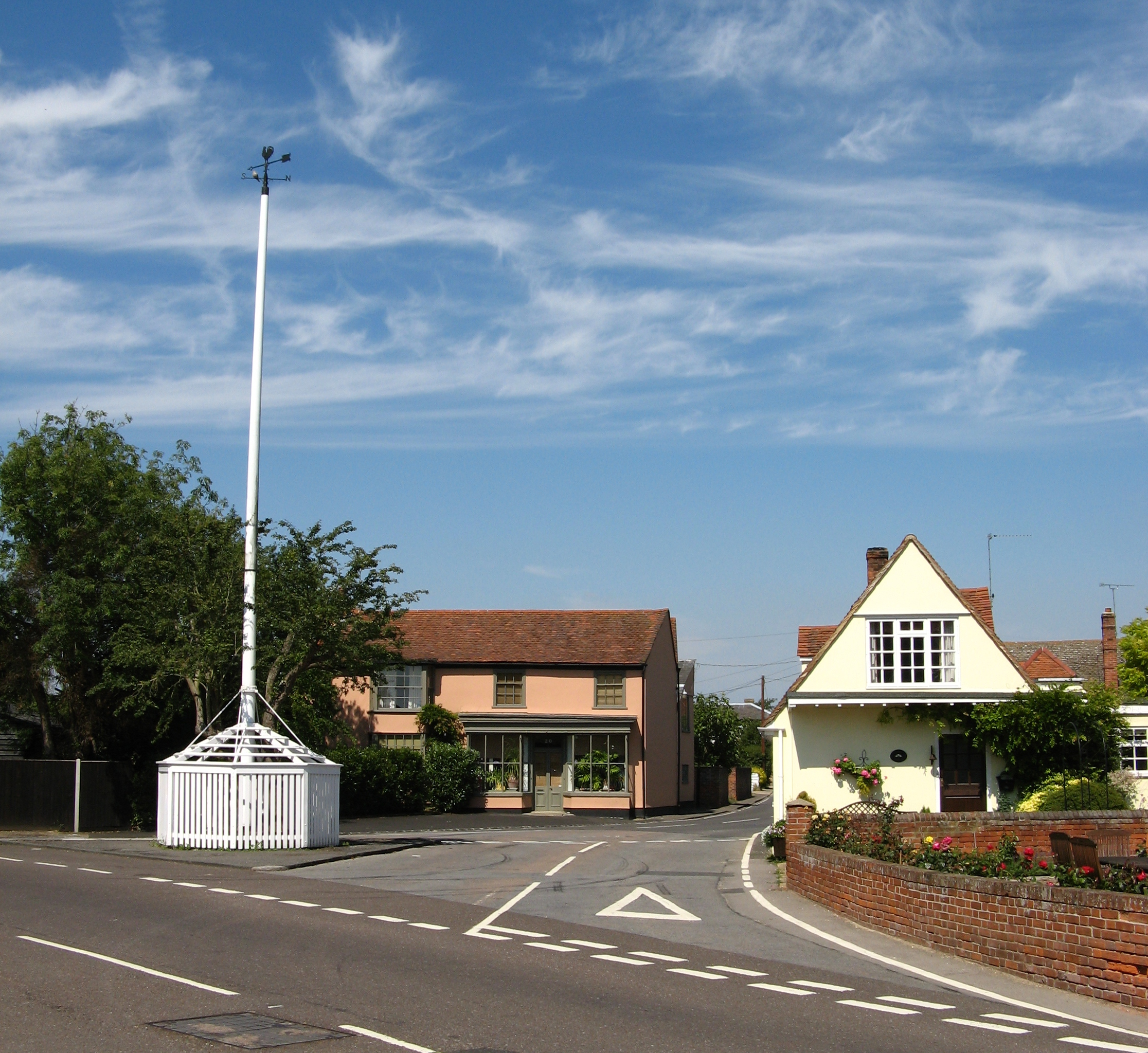
- Tolleshunt D'Arcy maypole

- Location within Essex
- Population: 1,138 (Parish, 2021)
- OS grid reference: TL930117
- Civil parish: Tolleshunt D'Arcy
- District: Maldon
- Shire county: Essex
- Region: East
- Country: England
- Sovereign state: United Kingdom
- Post town: MALDON
- Postcode district: CM9
- Dialling code: 01621
- Police: Essex
- Fire: Essex
- Ambulance: East of England
- UK Parliament: Witham

Tolleshunt D'Arcy (/ˌtoʊlzhʌnt ˈdɑːrsi/) is a village situated on the Blackwater estuary in the Maldon District of Essex, England. The village is 12 miles (19 km) southwest of Colchester, 19 miles (31 km) east of Chelmsford and 30 miles (48 km) north of Southend-on-Sea. At the 2021 census the parish had a population of 1,138.

== History ==
The name Tolleshunt originates from the Anglo-Saxon Tolleshunta which means Toll's spring. Toll was an Anglo-Saxon chief who settled in large areas of forest, establishing clearings where water was readily available.

William the Conqueror gave the manor to Ralph Peverell for services rendered during the Norman Conquest. The latter part of the village name altered as female heirs changed the name to that of their husbands. It became known as Tolleshunt Tregoz, Tolleshunt Valoines and Tolleshunt de Boys. John D'Arcy married a daughter of the De Boys family. By this match the estate came to the D'Arcy family in the 15th century. It remained in the family until the death of Thomas D'Arcy in 1593.

During that period, D'Arcy Hall, an early 16th-century building, was built as the family home and still remains. The interior is made from wood panelling bearing Anthony D'Arcy's initials and the date 1540. The bridge on the moat dates from the Elizabethan period as does the dovecote in the grounds. The russet D'Arcy Spice apple originated from the gardens in 1840. In the centre of the village is a maypole which is one of the few genuine maypoles remaining in the country. The base is now protected by a wooden cage.

D'Arcy House is a well-proportioned Queen Anne-style dwelling, and was the home of Dr. John Salter from 1864 to 1932. Born in 1841, the eldest son of a country gentleman, he had a long and varied career. Salter was a prize-winning horticulturist, vice-president of the English Kennel Club, and became Provincial Grand Master of the Freemasons. He is best remembered for his diary which he kept from 1849 until 1932.

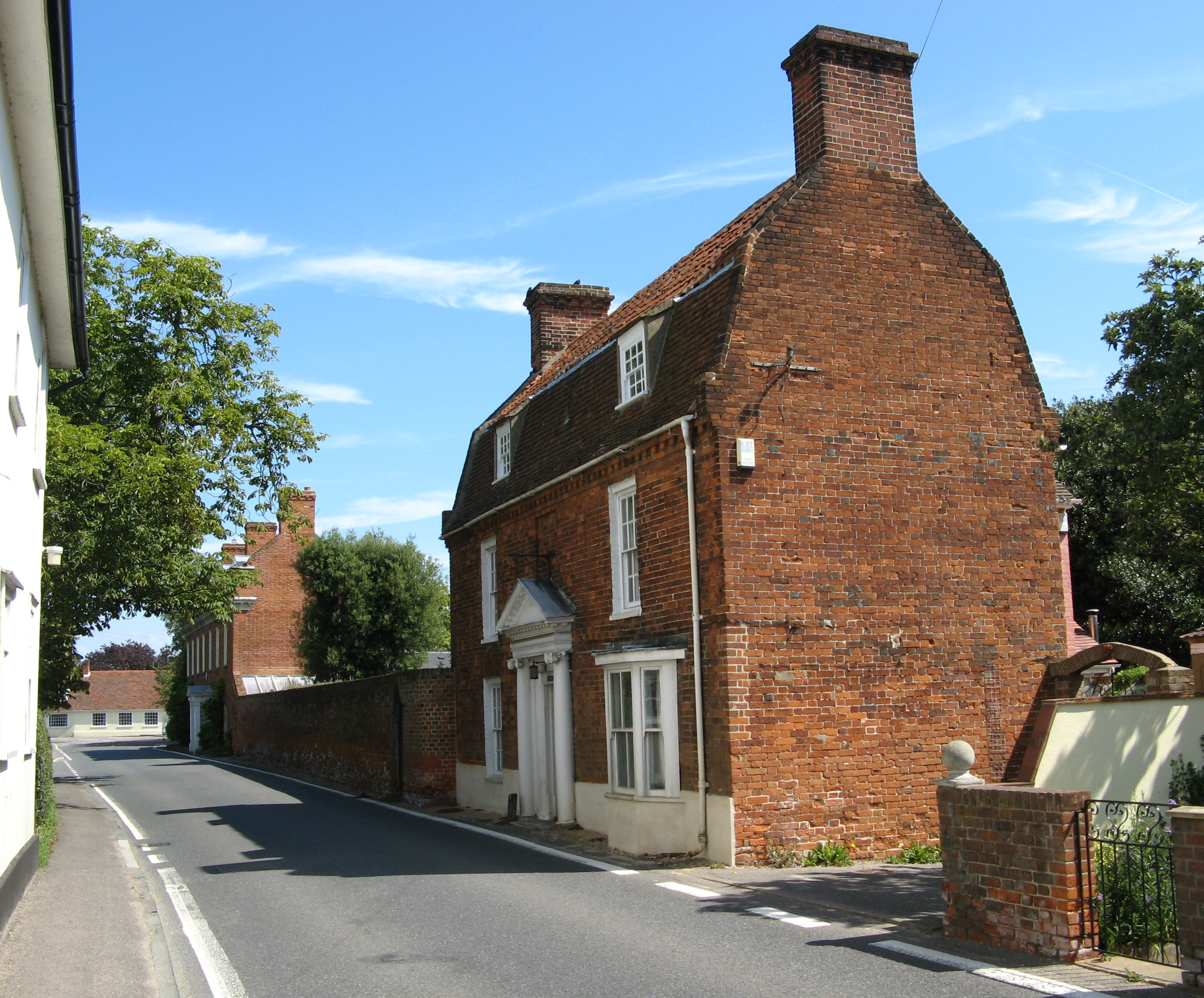
South Street, D'Arcy House is at the far end

From 1935 until 1966 the house became the home of the author Margery Allingham, creator of the fictional detective Albert Campion. Her memoir The Oaken Heart (1941) was based on life in the village of Tolleshunt D'Arcy during the Second World War. Her husband, Lt-Col. Philip Youngman-Carter, was a skilled illustrator who followed a spell as Features Editor for the Daily Express with ten years as editor of the Tatler. Her sister, Emily Joyce Allingham, was an amateur filmmaker who documented aspects of life in the village, such as its celebration of the coronation of Queen Elizabeth II in 1953.

Tolleshunt D'Arcy House now has a blue plaque commemorating Margery Allingham. The plaque was unveiled on the 88th anniversary of her birth by her sister Joyce on 20 May 1992. Allingham is buried in the newer village cemetery, about half a mile south of St Nicholas's Church graveyard on the other side of the road.

In August 1985, Tolleshunt D'Arcy made national headlines for an incident which became known as the White House Farm murders, when a couple, their adoptive daughter and her two children were shot and died from their injuries. In October 1986, Jeremy Bamber, a local farmer, was convicted of murdering the members of his family.

== Amenities ==
Tolleshunt D'Arcy still retains its village shop, an important feature of village life; as are the church, the village hall and the remaining public house, the Queen's Head, which is on the Campaign for Real Ale's National Inventory of Historic Pub Interiors. The former Red Lion public house became an Italian, then an Indian restaurant. The Thatchers pub in South Street was demolished for a new housing development in 2011.

From 1904 to 1951 the village was served by the Kelvedon and Tollesbury Light Railway, with a small station to the north of the village. The whole line closed for passengers on 5 May 1951 with goods traffic continuing between Tollesbury Pier and Tiptree until 29 October 1951. The section between Tiptree and Kelvedon continued in use for goods traffic until 28 September 1962.

== Governance ==
There are three tiers of local government covering Tolleshunt D'Arcy, at parish, district, and county level: Tolleshunt D'Arcy Parish Council, Maldon District Council, and Essex County Council. The parish council meets at the village hall on Tollesbury Road.

== St. Nicholas's Church ==
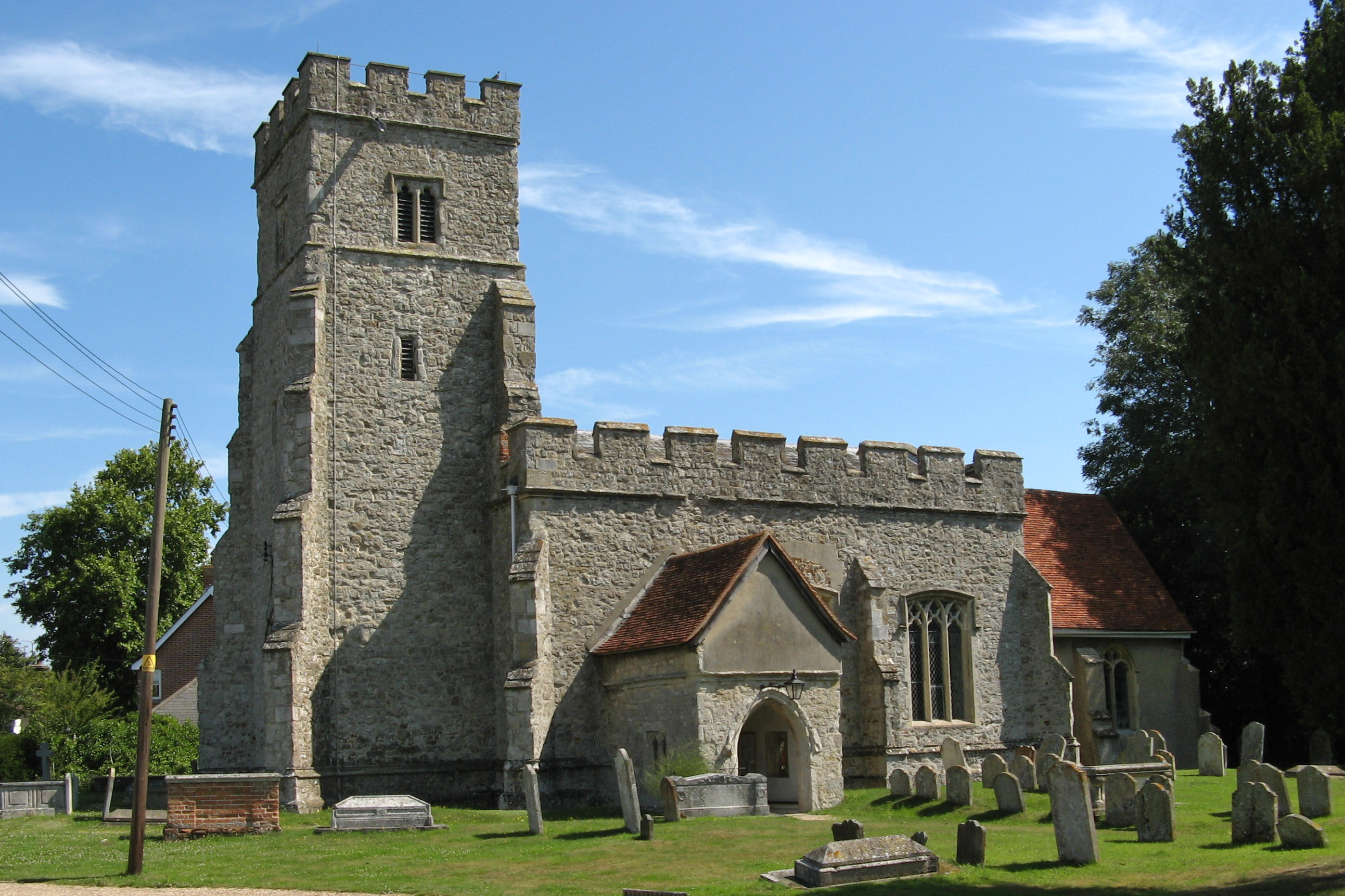
St. Nicholas's Church

The parish church of St Nicholas is in the Perpendicular style with a west tower, and a nave ceiling which was decorated in 1897 by Ernest Geldart. Villagers have contributed to a stained glass window to celebrate the millennium. The window, designed by local artist, Michael Smee, represents the village, the nearby River Blackwater, and the surrounding industries of agriculture and horticulture. The village's unique apple variety is also depicted..

== Schools ==
Tolleshunt D'Arcy has one primary school in the village on Tollesbury Road called St. Nicholas C of E School. This school serves the villages of Tolleshunt D’Arcy, Tolleshunt Major, Tolleshunt Knights, Goldhanger and Little Totham. The school is situated in the centre of Tolleshunt D'Arcy village and has acres of open grassland, a playground and a wild-life area. It is surrounded by farmland and has views over the Blackwater Estuary.

St. Nicholas Primary School provides a broad and balanced education for pupils between the ages of 4 and 11 years. It was founded according to the principles and practices of the Church of England. The school is a single-storey building built in 1983, which has 7 classrooms which include a large reception class room with its very own playground. There has been a school in Tolleshunt D’Arcy since before 1900. The school has a large hall used for assemblies, physical education (PE), teaching, meals and plays. It also has a library, ICT suite and wildlife quad with a pond. The school's latest Ofsted inspection dated November 2011 achieved an overall grade of 3 which is satisfactory.

There is also a pre-school in the village, Tolleshunt D'Arcy Pre-School which is in the village hall on Tollesbury Road. In its latest Ofsted inspection in May 2011 it was graded an overall grade of 2 which is Good.

== Points of interest ==
=== Old Hall Marshes ===
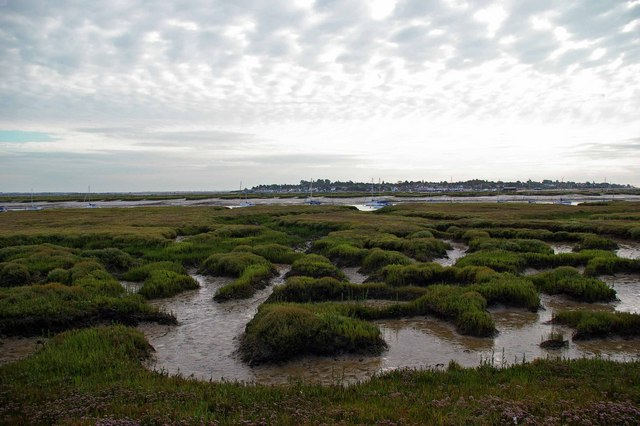
Saltings on eastern edge of Old Hall Marshes

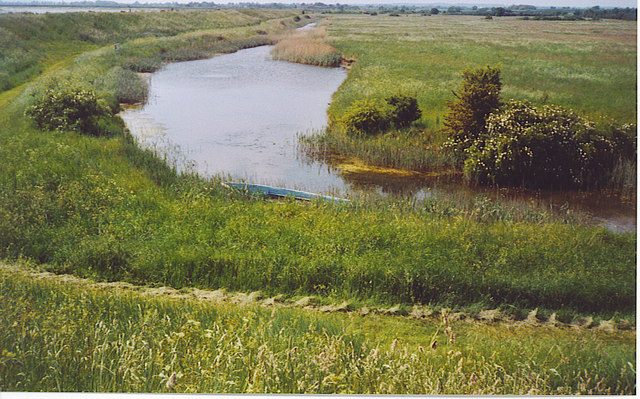
Red Hills, Salt Marshes, Tolleshunt D'Arcy

Old Hall Marshes is a nature reserve owned by the RSPB situated east of Tolleshunt D'Arcy. The reserve was bought by the RSPB in 1984 as a refuge for overwintering brent geese. The reserve occupies 459 hectares (1,130 acres) of grazing marshes with brackish water, saltmarsh, reedbeds and two off-shore islands. It was bought by the RSPB for £780,000 helped by donations to the Eric Morecambe Memorial Appeal.

Thousands of anthills of the yellow meadow ant can be found in the ancient grasslands of Old Hall Marshes as well as around twenty-four species of butterfly. Dragonflies are also popular in this area which include the scarce emerald damselfly and good numbers of ruddy darters.

In spring, a variety of birds can be seen, including gadwalls, shovelers and pochards, which can be seen in the open water and in the ditches; lapwings, avocets, oystercatchers and redshanks nest in the marshes; marsh harriers and barn owls can also be found. Migrant waders and whimbrel can also be found in the grassland.

In the summer months juvenile marsh harriers can be found in the reedbeds, along with greenshanks, spotted redshanks and ruff which can be found in the muddy margins. Cuckoos are also a popular bird seen in the summer months.

In autumn teals and wigeons are most popular seen in the shallow open waters, as well as flocks of golden plovers and lapwings. In the winter months hen harriers, merlins and brent geese can be found in the grazing area with short-eared owls found hunting in the grazing marshes. Sea ducks including red-breasted mergansers, grebes, divers and goldeneyes can be found in the estuarine channels. Snow buntings and twite can be seen on the seawall.

=== Tolleshunt D'Arcy Hall ===
Tolleshunt D'Arcy Hall is a moated house situated south of St Nicholas's Church. The house was originally the home of the D'Arcy family. The building was started by the D'Arcy family who intermarried with the De Boys family in the 15th century. The house was built in 1450. It is possible that the original bridge over the moat was a drawbridge, however the present bridge of brick and stone dates from about 1585. The entrance to D'Arcy Hall contains a row of apple spice trees now known as the D'Arcy Spice Apple. These apples was first found in the garden of the hall at Tolleshunt D'Arcy in 1880; the apple is a late russet variety which is picked in November.

=== Red Hills ===
The area has over three hundred remains of prehistoric and Roman salt-making sites, called Red Hills, which are found along the Essex coast. This site is now situated in eroding salt-marsh outside the modern sea-wall, and inspection on the ground shows that layers of broken briquetage survives above layers of charcoal which are the remains of ancient fires.

== Transport ==
From 1904 to 1951 the Kelvedon and Tollesbury Light Railway ran past the village, stopping at Tolleshunt d'Arcy railway station.

The closest station is Kelvedon on the Great Eastern Main Line between London Liverpool Street and Norwich.

== Healthcare ==
The nearest NHS hospitals are Broomfield Hospital in Chelmsford and Colchester Hospital near Stanway Colchester. Following the closure of the village surgery in March 2015, the nearest doctors' surgery is in Tollesbury.

== See also ==
- Wikipedia:WikiProject East Anglia
- Wikipedia:WikiProject East Anglia/Task forces/Essex
