= Jeremy Bamber =

British convicted murderer (born 1961)

- Bamber in 1985
- Born: Jeremy Paul Marsham; 13 January 1961 (age 65); Kensington, London, United Kingdom
- Status: Incarcerated
- Conviction: Murder (5 counts)
- Penalty: Whole life order (convicted 28 October 1986)

Details
- Date: 7 August 1985
- Country: England
- Location: Tolleshunt D'Arcy
- Killed: 5
- Weapon: .22LR Anschütz Model 525 semi-automatic rifle w/ silencer
- Date apprehended: 29 September 1985
- Imprisoned at: HM Prison Wakefield

Jeremy Nevill Bamber (born Jeremy Paul Marsham; 13 January 1961) is a British man convicted of the 1985 White House Farm murders. The events, which took place in Tolleshunt D'Arcy, Essex, involved five victims: Bamber's adoptive parents, Nevill and June Bamber; his adoptive sister, Sheila Caffell; and his sister's six-year-old twin sons. The prosecution had argued that Bamber committed the murders to secure a large inheritance, then had placed the rifle in the hands of his 28-year-old sister, who had been diagnosed with schizophrenia, to make the deaths appear to be a murder–suicide. The jury returned a majority guilty verdict.

Bamber is serving life imprisonment with a whole life tariff, meaning that he has no possibility of parole. He has repeatedly applied unsuccessfully to have his conviction overturned or his whole life tariff removed. His extended family remains convinced of his guilt. The Criminal Cases Review Commission (CCRC) referred the case to the Court of Appeal in 2001, which upheld the conviction in 2002. The appeal was rejected and the CCRC rejected further applications from Bamber in 2004 and 2012, with the commission stating in 2012 that it had not identified any new evidence or legal argument capable of raising a real possibility that his conviction would be quashed.

On 10 March 2021, a new application was lodged with the CCRC for a referral to the Court of Appeal. As of 2026, he has spent 40 years in prison, making him one of the longest-serving prisoners in the UK.

== Early life ==
=== Adoption, education ===
Jeremy Bamber was born Jeremy Paul Marsham in 1961 at St Mary Abbots Hospital, Kensington, London, to Juliet Dorothy Wheeler (born 1938 in Leicester), a vicar's daughter who had an affair with British Army Sergeant Major Leslie Brian Marsham (born 1931 in Tendring, Essex), a controller at Buckingham Palace. Wheeler gave her baby up for adoption through the Church of England Children's Society. Nevill and June Bamber adopted Bamber when he was six months old. It was only after his conviction that his biological parents were told by reporters that Bamber was their son. They were by then married to each other and working at Buckingham Palace.

The Bambers were wealthy farmers who lived in a large Georgian house at White House Farm, near Tolleshunt D'Arcy in Essex. Nevill was a local magistrate and former RAF pilot. The couple had adopted a baby girl, Sheila, four years prior to adopting Jeremy.

Bamber attended St Nicholas Primary, followed by Maldon Court, a private prep school. In September 1970 he was sent to Gresham's School, a boarding school in Holt, Norfolk. Bamber left Gresham's with no qualifications, much to Nevill's anger, but managed to pass seven O-levels at the sixth form college in Colchester in 1978. Brett Collins claims Bamber had sexual relationships with men and women, finding that his good looks and charm made him popular with both.

=== Work ===
After leaving school Nevill financed a trip for Bamber to Australia, where he took a scuba diving course, and to New Zealand. In New Zealand, according to Collins, Bamber was "ripped off" by a would-be heroin dealer in Auckland. Bamber reportedly boasted of smuggling heroin overseas and broke into a jewellery shop to steal two expensive watches, one of which he gave to a girlfriend in the UK. One of Bamber's cousins claimed that he left New Zealand in a hurry after friends of his had been involved in an armed robbery.

Bamber returned to the UK and worked in restaurants and bars, including a period as a waiter in a Little Chef on the A12; but he later agreed to return home and work on his father's farm. Although Bamber reportedly resented the low wages, he was given a car and lived rent-free in a cottage his father owned at 9 Head Street, Goldhanger, 3.5 miles (5.6 km) from his family's farmhouse at White House Farm. He also owned eight percent of his family's caravan site, Osea Road Camp Sites Ltd., in Maldon, Essex. A few weeks before the murders, Bamber broke into and stole from the caravan park; this was only revealed following the murders, when he admitted to the burglary after his girlfriend Julie Mugford came forward as a witness against him.

== White House Farm murders ==
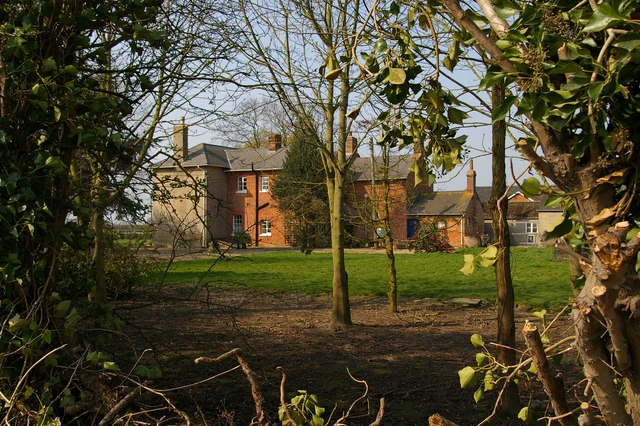
White House Farm in 2007

Bamber claims he alerted police to the shootings at around 3:30am on 7 August 1985. He contends that he told them Nevill had telephoned him to say that Bamber's sister, Sheila Caffell, had gone "berserk" with Nevill's rifle. When police entered the farmhouse at White House Farm, Caffell was found dead on the floor of her parents' bedroom with the rifle up against her throat. June was found dead in the same room. Caffell's six-year-old twin sons, Nicholas and Daniel, were found dead in their beds in another upstairs room, while Nevill was found dead in the kitchen downstairs. The family had been shot a total of twenty-five times, mostly at close range.

Sheila had spent time in a psychiatric hospital undergoing treatment for schizophrenia months before the murders. The police believed that she was responsible until Mugford told them Jeremy had implicated himself. The prosecution argued that there was no evidence that Bamber's father had telephoned him, stating that Nevill was too badly injured to have spoken to anyone; that there was no blood on the kitchen phone; and that he would have called the police, not Bamber. They also argued that the silencer was on the rifle when the shots were fired, and that Caffell's reach was not long enough to hold the gun and silencer at her throat and press the trigger. In addition, Sheila was not strong enough, they said, to have overcome Nevill in what appeared to have been a violent struggle in the kitchen. They also argued that the fact she had been shot twice in her apparent suicide attempt was evidence that she was not the killer.

Bamber's defence team have unsuccessfully challenged the evidence over the years. They alleged that a police log suggested that Bamber's father had indeed called the police that night and that the silencer may not have been on the gun during the attacks. The evidence about the silencer was unreliable, they argued, because the silencer was found in a farmhouse cupboard by one of Bamber's cousins three days after the murders.

== Life in prison ==
Bamber is currently confined at HM Prison Wakefield. While there, he has worked as a peer partner, which involves helping other prisoners to read and write, and won several awards for transcribing books in the prison's braille workshop. In 2001, The Times alleged that he had been treated with indulgence at HM Prison Long Lartin, Worcestershire, where prisoners were given the key to their cells. Among the allegations were claims that he studied for his GCSE in Sociology and Media Studies, had a daily badminton lesson, and drew pictures of supermodels in an art class, which he later sold through an outside agent.

He has a group of outside supporters, and he has reportedly developed several close relationships with women since his conviction. He defended himself on one occasion from a knife attack by another prisoner by using a broken bottle, and on another received twenty-eight stitches on his neck after being attacked while making a telephone call. In 1994, Bamber called a radio station from Long Lartin prison to declare his innocence.

In May 2026, the prison service confirmed that Bamber had been banned from having any direct contact with journalists, citing "the need to protect victims from serious distress and maintain confidence in the justice system".

== Legal actions ==
Bamber launched two unsuccessful legal actions while in prison to recover a share of his family's estate. His grandmother had cut Bamber out of her will when he was arrested, and most of the inheritance went to June's sister. In 2004, Bamber went to the High Court again to claim a share of the profits from the Bambers' caravan site in Maldon. He had retained his shares after his conviction, but had sold them to pay the legal costs arising from his claim on his grandmother's estate. The court ruled that he was not entitled to any profit from the site because of his conviction.

In January 2012, Bamber and two other British prisoners, Peter Moore and Douglas Vinter, lost a case before the European Court of Human Rights, in which they argued that whole-life imprisonment amounts to degrading and inhuman treatment. In July 2012, they were granted the right to appeal that decision. In July 2013, the Court's Grand Chamber ruled in their favour, holding that there must be sentence review with the potential for release.

On 10 March 2021, a new application was lodged with the CCRC for a referral to the Court of Appeal. The submissions contained new evidence not previously considered by the Courts and based on 350,000 documents released to Bamber and his legal team in 2011 after the expiry of a Public Interest Immunity order. Initially, eight issues, each containing multiple grounds of appeal, were lodged, with another two added before the end of the year. In October 2022 it was reported that Bamber's legal team, led by his Solicitor Advocate, had sent the CCRC ten new items of evidence, which they claimed cast doubt on the prosecution's contention that the silencer was used in the murders.

In May 2023, the Independent Office for Police Conduct ruled that Essex Police breached its statutory duty by not referring 29 serious complaints to the IOPC about how senior officers handled the case.

It was reported in November 2024 that Bamber's conviction was among 1,200 being reviewed by the CCRC in the aftermath of the Andrew Malkinson scandal.

In July 2025, the CCRC announced that they had reviewed four of Bamber's ten grounds for appeal and had decided they should not be referred to the Court of Appeal. The other six grounds remained under review.

== The Bamber files ==
In 2026 the Guardian began a series of articles titled the Bamber files, considering discrete pieces of evidence in the White House Farm case. The articles were sympathetic towards Bamber's claim of innocence. On 27 Feb 2026, the first article focused on the silencer. On 23 Oct 2026, the topic was forensic evidence, and on 30 October 2026 the timing of phone calls was studied in detail.

== See also ==
- White House Farm (TV series)
- Bain family murders
