= Tollesbury Wick =

Nature reserve in Essex, England

Coordinates: 51.75°N 0.86°E

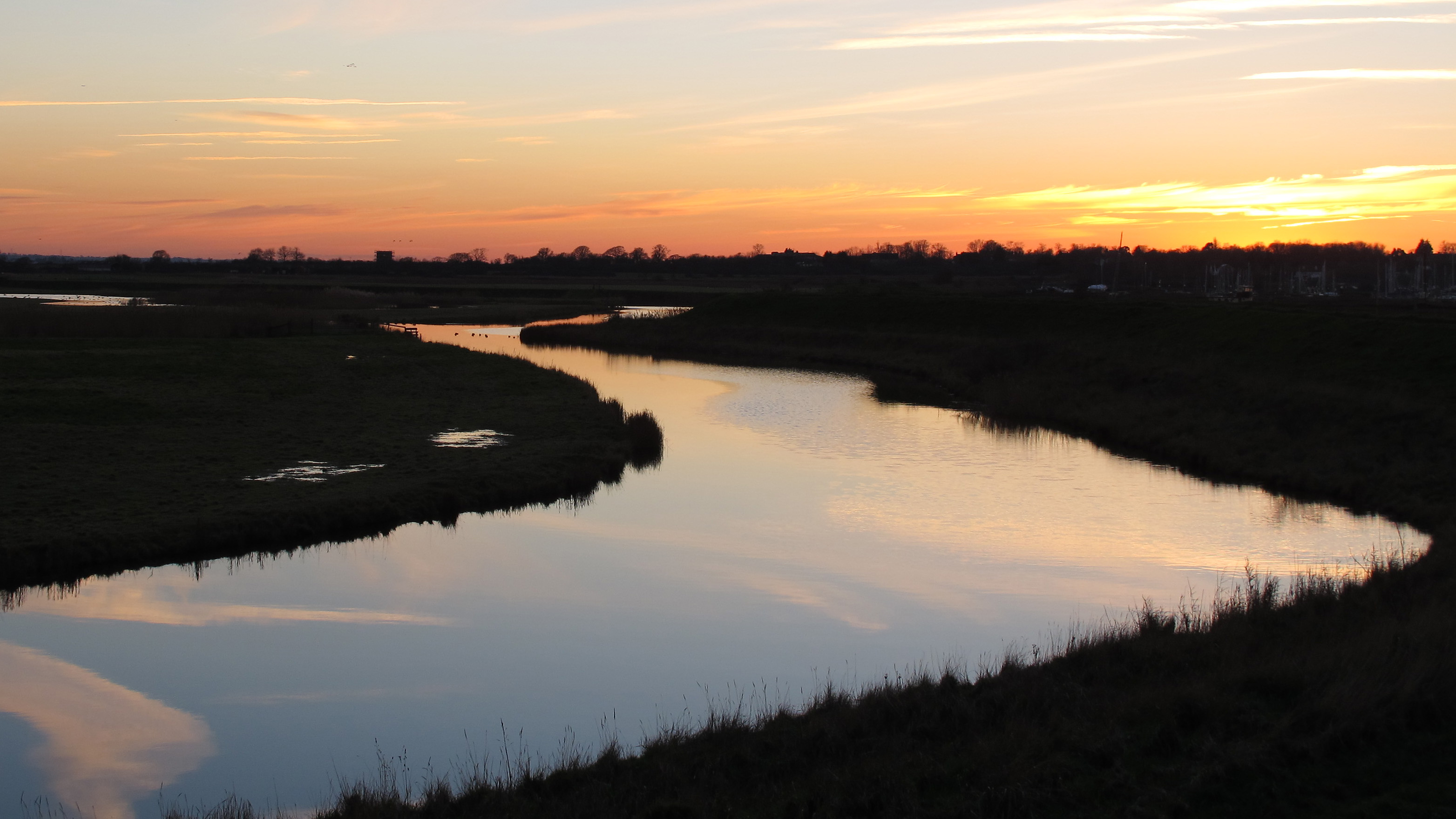
- Interactive map of Tollesbury Wick
- Type: Nature reserve
- Location: Tollesbury, Essex
- OS grid: TL 970 103
- Area: 242.8 hectares (600 acres)
- Manager: Essex Wildlife Trust

Tollesbury Wick is a 242.8-hectare (600-acre) nature reserve east of Tollesbury in Essex. It is managed by the Essex Wildlife Trust. Tollesbury Wick Marshes is part of the Blackwater Estuary Site of Special Scientific Interest.

This area is coastal freshwater marsh, which is grazed by sheep. It is worked by traditional methods that encourage wildlife. Areas of ungrazed rough pasture have badgers, and field voles and pygmy shrews are hunted by hen harriers and short-eared owls.

The shore of the marshes is within the Blackwater, Crouch, Roach and Colne Estuaries Marine Conservation Zone. There is access from the sea wall only to a footpath to a bird hide.

== History ==
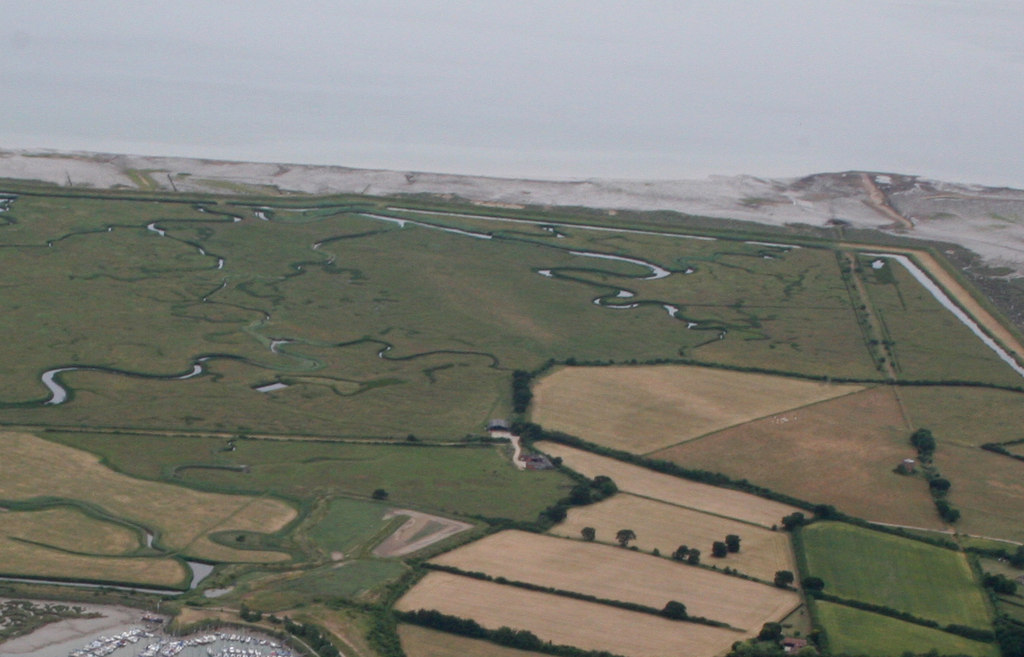
South-west corner of the marsh before the 2015 watering improvement project

The marshes were once part of a salt production industry during the Iron Age and Roman periods, and red hills created by this process are found across the area.

Tollesbury Pier railway station was to the south-west of the marsh, the southern extension of the Kelvedon and Tollesbury Light Railway, offering a passenger service from 1907 to 1921. The anticipated development of housing and yachting facilities near the station never materialised.

The Essex Wildlife Trust acquired the area in the 1990s. Previously the area was highly drained flat arable and rough set-aside farmland, with little wildlife. The trust allowed water to collect in the area, but the land had drainage problems and also did not hold water well into dry periods. In 2015, a project was completed creating a sculpted landscape, watered from a newly constructed reservoir, supporting wildlife habitats well.
