= Tolleshunt Knights railway station =

Former railway station in England

Coordinates: 51.802°N 0.7643°E

Tolleshunt Knights
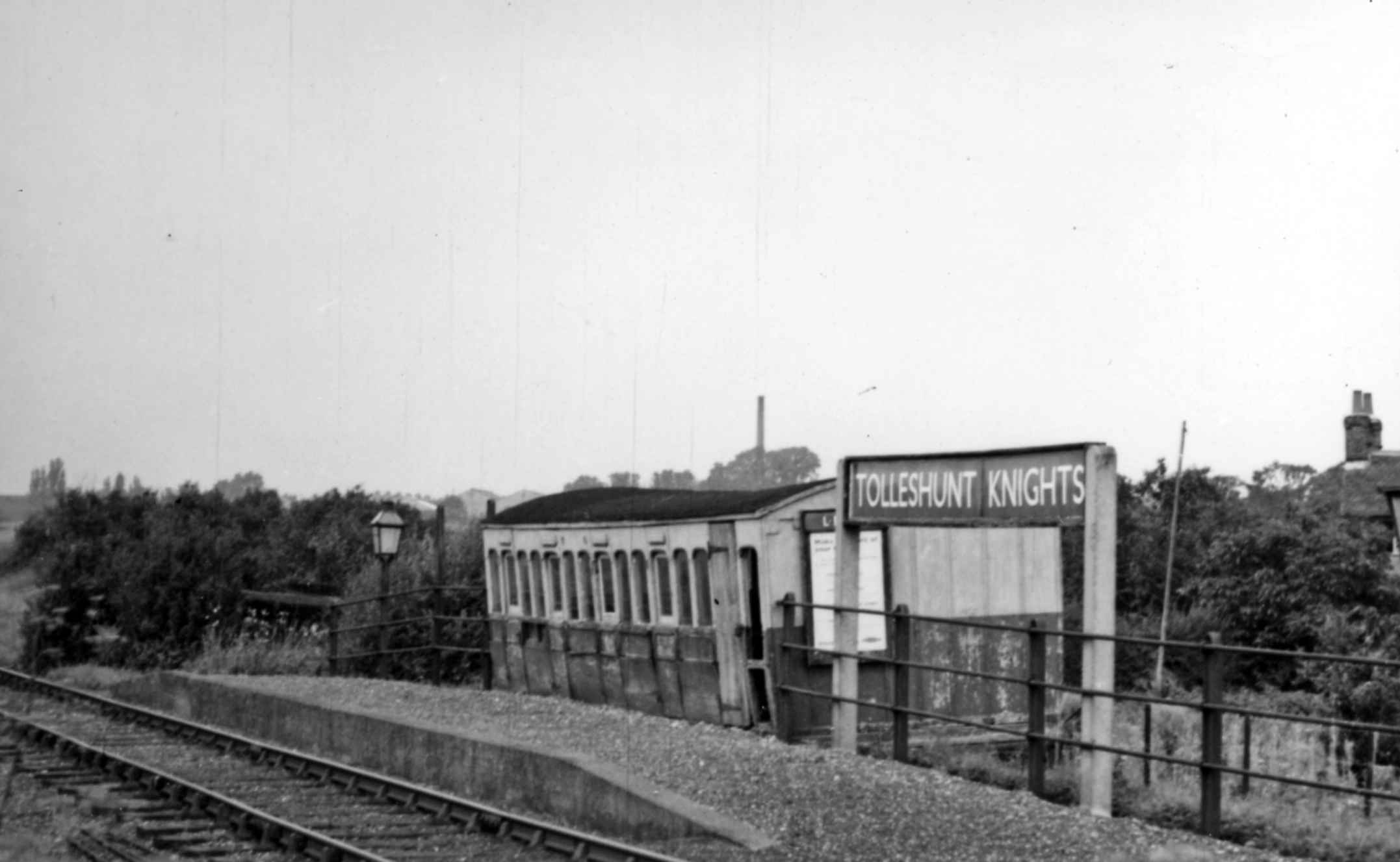
- 7 August 1950

General information
- Location: Tolleshunt Knights, Maldon; England
- Platforms: 1

Other information
- Status: Disused

History
- Original company: Great Eastern Railway
- Pre-grouping: Great Eastern Railway
- Post-grouping: London and North Eastern Railway

Key dates
- 12 December 1910: Opened
- 7 May 1951: Closed
Location

Tolleshunt Knights railway station was on the Kelvedon and Tollesbury Light Railway, serving the village of Tolleshunt Knights, Essex. The station was 4 miles 1 chain (6.46 km) from Kelvedon Low Level railway station.

The station was opened in 1910. It was closed, along with the rest of the line, on 7 May 1951.

Preceding station	Disused railways	Following station
Tiptree	Great Eastern Railway; Kelvedon and Tollesbury Light Railway	Tolleshunt d'Arcy
