= Tolleshunt d'Arcy railway station =

Former railway station serving the village of Tolleshunt D'Arcy

Coordinates: 51.7769°N 0.8°E

Tolleshunt D'Arcy
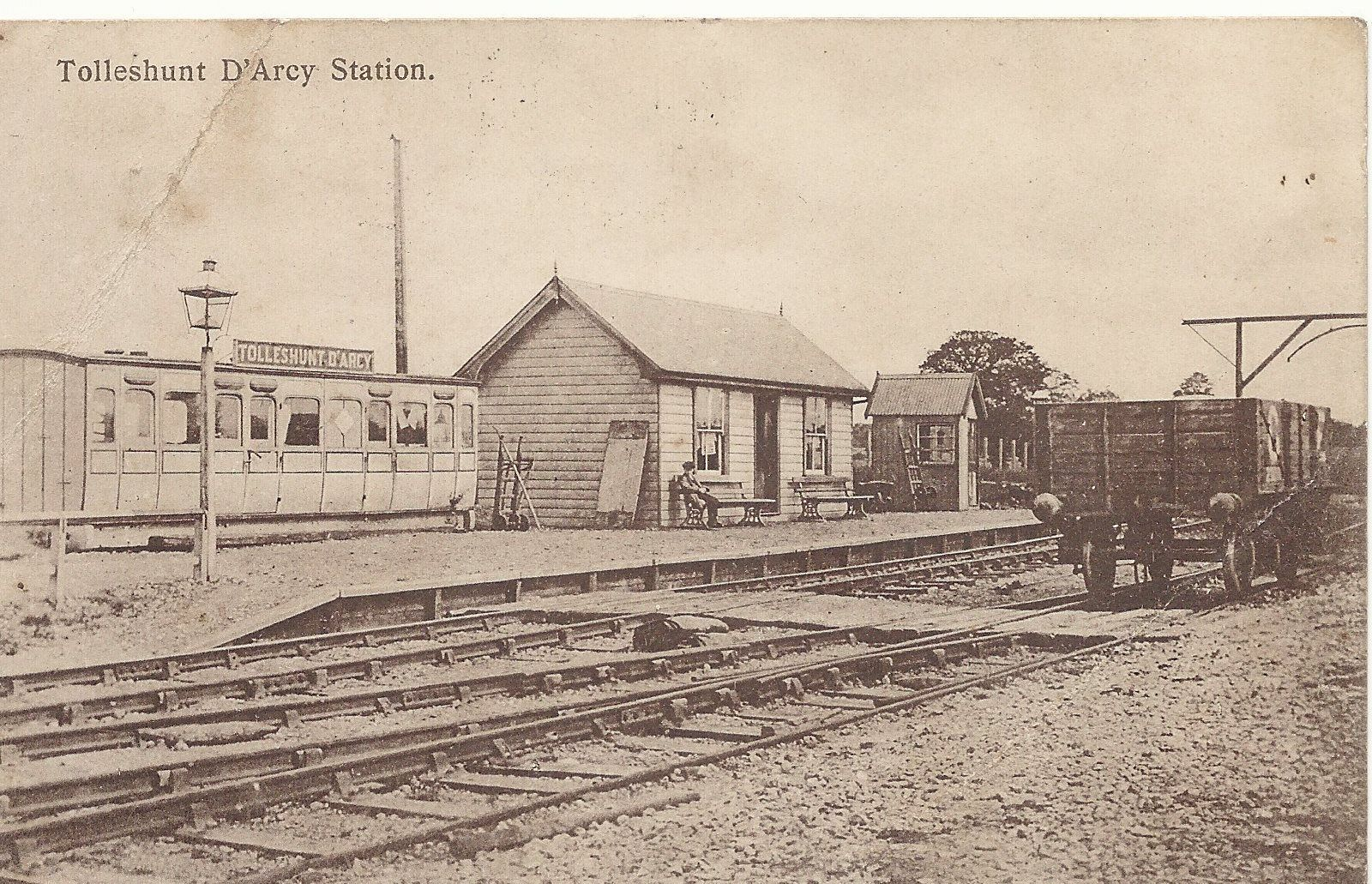

General information
- Location: Tolleshunt D'Arcy, Maldon; England
- Platforms: 1

Other information
- Status: Disused

History
- Original company: Kelvedon and Tollesbury Light Railway
- Pre-grouping: Great Eastern Railway
- Post-grouping: London and North Eastern Railway

Key dates
- 1 October 1904: Opened
- 7 May 1951: Closed
Location

Tolleshunt D'Arcy railway station was on the Kelvedon and Tollesbury Light Railway, serving the village of Tolleshunt D'Arcy, Essex. The station was 6 miles 52 chains (10.70 km) from Kelvedon Low Level railway station.

The station was opened in 1904. It was closed, along with the rest of the line, on 7 May 1951.

Preceding station	Disused railways	Following station
Tolleshunt Knights	Great Eastern Railway; Kelvedon and Tollesbury Light Railway	Tollesbury
