= Inworth railway station =

Former railway station in England

Coordinates: 51.8255°N 0.7252°E

Inworth

General information
- Location: Tiptree, Colchester; England
- Platforms: 1

Other information
- Status: Disused

History
- Original company: Kelvedon and Tollesbury Light Railway
- Pre-grouping: Great Eastern Railway
- Post-grouping: London and North Eastern Railway

Key dates
- 1 May 1905: Opened
- 7 May 1951: Closed
Location

Inworth railway station was on the Kelvedon and Tollesbury Light Railway, serving the villages of Inworth and Tiptree Essex. The station was 2 miles 75 chains (4.73 km) from Kelvedon (Low Level) station.

The station was opened in 1905. It was closed, along with the rest of the line, on 7 May 1951.

| Preceding station | Disused railways | Following station |
|---|---|---|
| Feering Halt | Great Eastern Railway; Kelvedon and Tollesbury Light Railway | Tiptree |
