= Tollesbury railway station =

Defunct railway station in Tollesbury, England

Coordinates: 51.7619°N 0.8335°E

Tollesbury
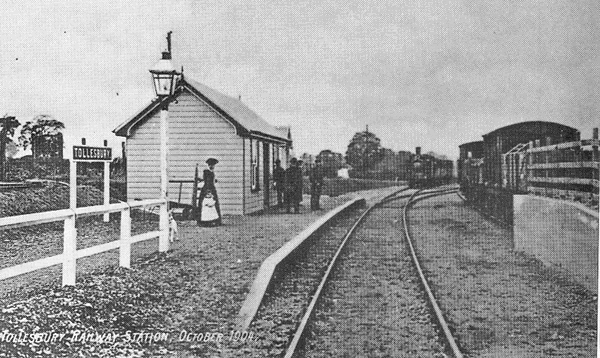
- Tollesbury station in 1904

General information
- Location: Tollesbury, Maldon; England
- Platforms: 1

Other information
- Status: Disused

History
- Original company: Kelvedon and Tollesbury Light Railway
- Pre-grouping: Great Eastern Railway
- Post-grouping: London and North Eastern Railway

Key dates
- 1 October 1904: Opened
- 7 May 1951: Closed to passengers
- 29 October 1951: completely closed
Location

Tollesbury railway station was on the Kelvedon and Tollesbury Light Railway, serving the village of Tollesbury, Essex. The station was 8 miles 42 chains (13.72 km) from Kelvedon Low Level railway station.

The station was opened in 1904 and passenger services were withdrawn on 7 May 1951. but freight trains continued to serve the station until 29th October thar year.

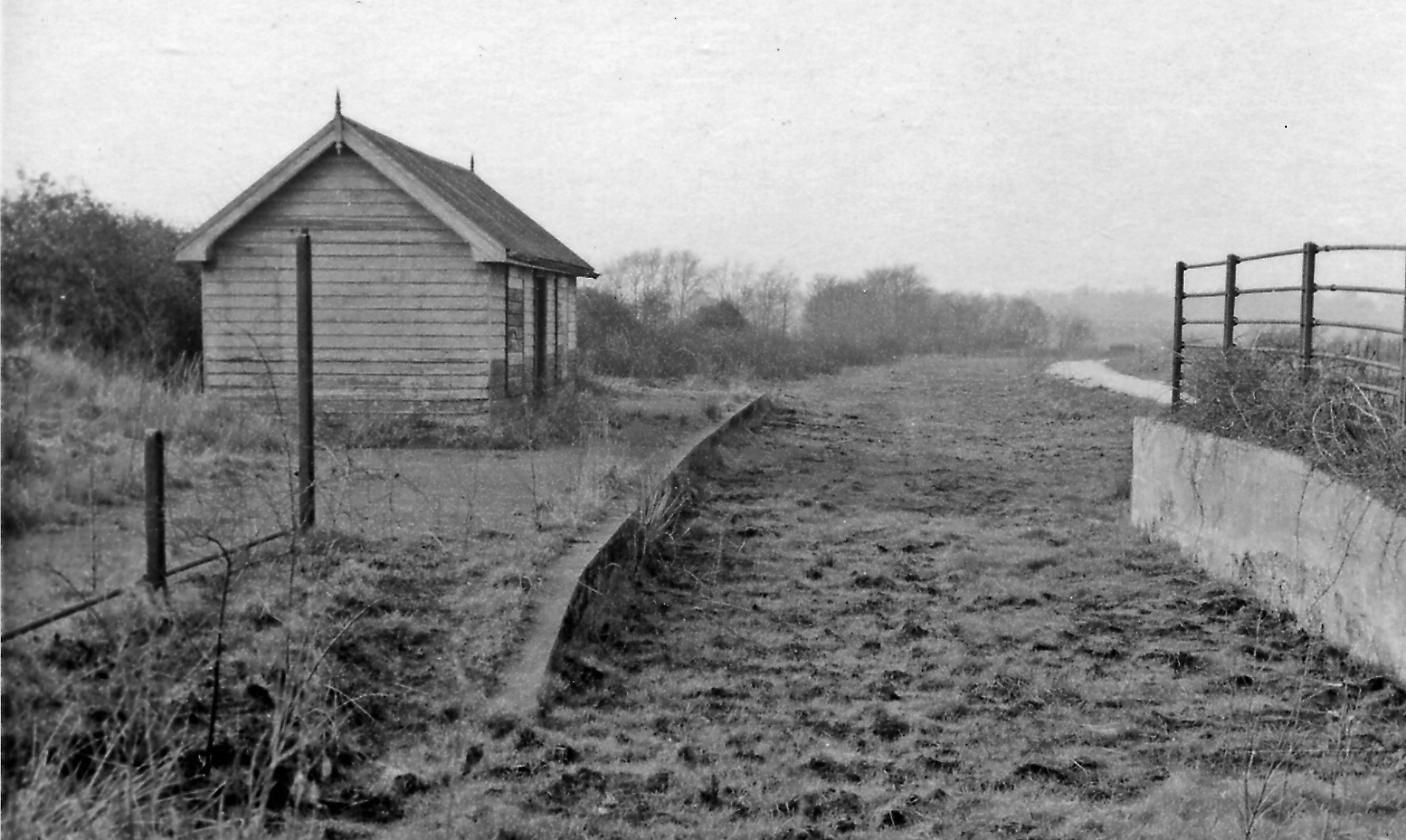
The remains in 1960

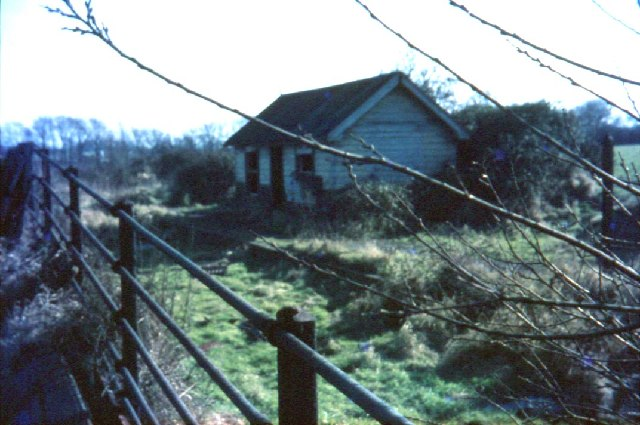
After closure, in 1969

Preceding station	Disused railways	Following station
Tolleshunt d'Arcy	Great Eastern Railway; Kelvedon and Tollesbury Light Railway	Tollesbury Pier
