= Tiptree railway station =

Former railway station in England

Coordinates: 51.8074°N 0.7511°E

Tiptree
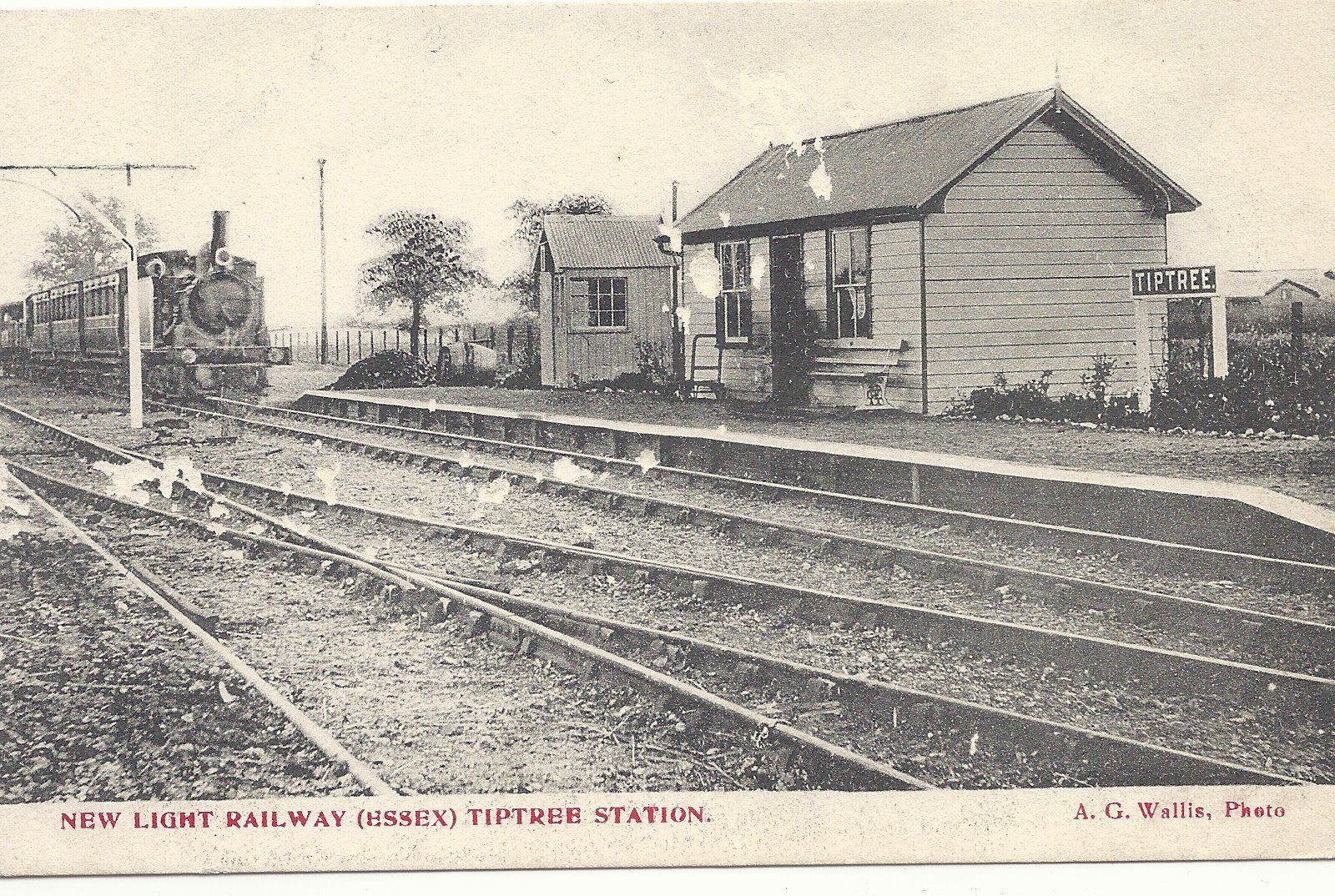

General information
- Location: Tiptree, Colchester; England
- Platforms: 1

Other information
- Status: Disused

History
- Original company: Kelvedon and Tollesbury Light Railway
- Pre-grouping: Great Eastern Railway
- Post-grouping: London and North Eastern Railway

Key dates
- 1 October 1904: Opened
- 7 May 1951: Closed
Location

Tiptree railway station was on the Kelvedon and Tollesbury Light Railway, serving the village of Tiptree, Essex, England. The station was 3 miles 39 chains (5.61 km) from Kelvedon Low Level railway station.

The station was opened in 1904. It was closed, along with the rest of the line for passengers, on 7 May 1951.

A short siding ran from the station into the Wilkin & Sons jam factory for freight traffic. The section between the jam factory and Kelvedon, through the closed Tiptree station, continued in use for freight traffic until 28 September 1962.

| Preceding station | Disused railways | Following station |
|---|---|---|
| Inworth | Great Eastern Railway; Kelvedon and Tollesbury Light Railway | Tolleshunt Knights |
