= Listed buildings in Feering =

Historic structures in Essex, England

Feering is a village and civil parish in the Braintree District of Essex, England. It contains 44 listed buildings that are recorded in the National Heritage List for England. Of these one is grade I, six are grade II* and 37 are grade II.

This list is based on the information retrieved online from Historic England.

== Key ==
| Grade | Criteria |
|---|---|
| I | Buildings that are of exceptional interest |
| II* | Particularly important buildings of more than special interest |
| II | Buildings that are of special interest |

== Listing ==
| Name | Grade | Location | Type | Completed (Note: The date given is the date used by Historic England as significant for the initial building or that of an important part in the structure's description.) | Date designated | Grid ref. (Note: The grid reference is based on the British national grid reference system, sometimes known as OSGB36, used by the Ordnance Survey.) Geo-coordinates | Notes | Entry number (Note: The "List Entry Number" is a unique number assigned to each listed building and scheduled monument by Historic England.) | Image | Wikidata |
|---|---|---|---|---|---|---|---|---|---|---|
| Barn 20 Metres North West of Coggeshall Hall Farmhouse | II | | | | 29 July 1988 | TL8604720645; 51°51′12″N 0°42′00″E | | 1123869 | Upload Photo | Q26416956 |
| Coggeshall Hall Farmhouse | II | | | | 2 May 1953 | TL8607320626; 51°51′12″N 0°42′01″E | | 1306737 | Upload Photo | Q26593481 |
| Barn of Feeringbury Farm, 60 Metres South East of Feeringbury Manor | II | 60 Metres South East Of Feeringbury Manor, Coggeshall Road | | | 29 July 1988 | TL8639721508; 51°51′40″N 0°42′20″E | | 1123829 | Upload Photo | Q26416922 |
| Ancillary Building 6 Metres South East of Feeringbury Manor | II* | Coggeshall Road | | | 21 December 1967 | TL8635821543; 51°51′41″N 0°42′18″E | | 1123828 | Upload Photo | Q17557409 |
| Barn 50 Metres North North West of Feering Place | II | Coggeshall Road | | | 19 March 2003 | TL8695920646; 51°51′11″N 0°42′48″E | | 1350318 | Upload Photo | Q26633534 |
| Barn 50 Metres South West of Frame Farmhouse | II | Coggeshall Road | | | 29 July 1988 | TL8681220692; 51°51′13″N 0°42′40″E | | 1337603 | Upload Photo | Q26622004 |
| Barn 60 Metres North West of Feering Place | II | Coggeshall Road | | | 19 March 2003 | TL8694220639; 51°51′11″N 0°42′47″E | | 1350319 | Upload Photo | Q26633535 |
| Bushmoor Cowes | II | Coggeshall Road | | | 1 February 1988 | TL8705520378; 51°51′02″N 0°42′52″E | | 1123830 | Upload Photo | Q26416923 |
| Feering Place | II | Coggeshall Road | | | 21 December 1967 | TL8698520606; 51°51′10″N 0°42′49″E | | 1123831 | Upload Photo | Q26416924 |
| Feeringbury Manor | II* | Coggeshall Road | manor house | | 2 May 1953 | TL8633121558; 51°51′41″N 0°42′17″E | | 1306710 | Feeringbury Manor More images | Q17557738 |
| Moor Cottage | II | Coggeshall Road | | | 29 July 1988 | TL8715720321; 51°51′00″N 0°42′57″E | | 1337604 | Upload Photo | Q26622005 |
| Waterwheel and Mounting Approximately 23 Metres South West of Feeringbury Manor | II | Coggeshall Road | | | 29 July 1988 | TL8630021535; 51°51′41″N 0°42′15″E | | 1337602 | Upload Photo | Q26622003 |
| The Sun Inn | II* | 3, Feering Hill | pub | | 2 May 1953 | TL8661319280; 51°50′27″N 0°42′27″E | | 1123832 | The Sun Inn More images | Q17557426 |
| Sun Cottage | II* | 5, Feering Hill | | | 21 December 1967 | TL8661919286; 51°50′28″N 0°42′27″E | | 1337605 | Upload Photo | Q17557813 |
| Feering House | II* | 7, Feering Hill | | | 21 December 1967 | TL8664119304; 51°50′28″N 0°42′28″E | | 1123833 | Upload Photo | Q17557441 |
| Complex of Walls, Railings and Gates Forming the Street Boundary of Number 11 (the Vicarage), from the North East End Extending 128 Metres to the North West and Then 17 Metres to the South West, and from the South West End Extending 52 Metr | II | Railings And Gates Forming The Street Boundary Of Number 11 (the Vicarage), From The North East End Extending 128 Metres To The North West And Then 17 Metres To The South West, And From The South West End Extending 52 Metr, Feering Hill | | | 20 August 1981 | TL8668819330; 51°50′29″N 0°42′31″E | | 1169227 | Upload Photo | Q26462431 |
| The Vicarage | II | 11, Feering Hill | | | 20 August 1981 | TL8667919338; 51°50′29″N 0°42′30″E | | 1123834 | Upload Photo | Q26416925 |
| Bridge House | II | 18, Feering Hill | | | 21 December 1967 | TL8663319250; 51°50′26″N 0°42′28″E | | 1169327 | Upload Photo | Q26462521 |
| Timbers | II | 20, Feering Hill | | | 21 December 1967 | TL8663719258; 51°50′27″N 0°42′28″E | | 1337607 | Upload Photo | Q26622007 |
| Wall Forming the Street Boundary of Number 9, and Extending 25 Metres Along the South West Boundary | II | And Extending 25 Metres Along The South West Boundary, Feering Hill | | | 23 September 1981 | TL8666119312; 51°50′28″N 0°42′29″E | | 1306660 | Upload Photo | Q26593418 |
| Wall Along the Street Boundary of Number 15 (st Andrews) and Number 15a (feering Hill House) from the East Corner of the Wall of Number 11 (the Vicarage), 42 Metres to the North East | II | 42 Metres To The North East, Feering Hill | | | 23 September 1981 | TL8672019352; 51°50′30″N 0°42′33″E | | 1169292 | Upload Photo | Q26462491 |
| Feering Hill House St Andrews | II | 15a, Feering Hill | | | 23 September 1981 | TL8672719372; 51°50′30″N 0°42′33″E | | 1337606 | Upload Photo | Q26622006 |
| The Barn and Attached Ancillary Buildings | II | Feering Hill | | | 31 July 1980 | TL8675619416; 51°50′32″N 0°42′35″E | | 1123835 | Upload Photo | Q26416926 |
| The Old Anchor Public House | II | Feering Hill | pub | | 29 July 1988 | TL8715419597; 51°50′37″N 0°42′56″E | | 1169347 | The Old Anchor Public House More images | Q26462541 |
| Cobham Oak Cottages | II* | Inworth Road | | | 22 January 1986 | TL8720619596; 51°50′37″N 0°42′58″E | | 1123836 | Upload Photo | Q17557463 |
| Pump Approximately 7 Metres North East of Cobham Oak Cottages | II | Inworth Road | | | 29 July 1988 | TL8720919614; 51°50′37″N 0°42′59″E | | 1169412 | Upload Photo | Q26462602 |
| Barn 25 Metres North East of Old Wills Farmhouse | II | Little Tey Road | | | 29 July 1988 | TL8791721121; 51°51′25″N 0°43′39″E | | 1123838 | Upload Photo | Q26416928 |
| Hornigalls Farmhouse | II | Little Tey Road | | | 29 July 1988 | TL8880222334; 51°52′03″N 0°44′27″E | | 1123837 | Upload Photo | Q26416927 |
| Old Wills Farmhouse | II | Little Tey Road | | | 29 July 1988 | TL8789121103; 51°51′25″N 0°43′37″E | | 1169439 | Upload Photo | Q26462632 |
| Poplar Hall Farmhouse | II | Little Tey Road | | | 29 July 1988 | TL8810021382; 51°51′34″N 0°43′49″E | | 1337608 | Upload Photo | Q26622008 |
| Prested Hall | II | Prested Hall Chase | country house hotel | | 29 July 1988 | TL8830619629; 51°50′37″N 0°43′56″E | | 1169450 | Prested Hall More images | Q26462643 |
| Rye Mill House | II | Rye Mill Lane | house | | 23 February 1981 | TL8679819993; 51°50′50″N 0°42′38″E | | 1337609 | Rye Mill House More images | Q26622009 |
| Cockerell's Farmhouse and Bakehouse | II | Skye Green | | | 29 July 1988 | TL8719422114; 51°51′58″N 0°43′03″E | | 1169484 | Upload Photo | Q26462675 |
| The Old Cottage | II | Skye Green | | | 29 July 1988 | TL8704321914; 51°51′52″N 0°42′54″E | | 1123839 | Upload Photo | Q26416929 |
| K6 Telephone Kiosk (ngr 8721 2030) | II | The Green | | | 29 July 1988 | TL8721020300; 51°51′00″N 0°43′00″E | | 1306468 | Upload Photo | Q26593245 |
| Church Farm Cottages | II | 1, 2 and 3, The Street | | | 29 July 1988 | TL8728620358; 51°51′01″N 0°43′04″E | | 1123842 | Upload Photo | Q26416931 |
| Apple Tree Cottage | II | The Street | | | 29 July 1988 | TL8726720344; 51°51′01″N 0°43′03″E | | 1169872 | Upload Photo | Q26463046 |
| Church Cottage | II | The Street | | | 29 July 1988 | TL8720220340; 51°51′01″N 0°43′00″E | | 1169508 | Upload Photo | Q26462702 |
| Church Farmhouse | II | The Street | | | 29 July 1988 | TL8731320358; 51°51′01″N 0°43′06″E | | 1169878 | Upload Photo | Q26463052 |
| Church Gate House | II | The Street | | | 29 July 1988 | TL8727620408; 51°51′03″N 0°43′04″E | | 1169574 | Upload Photo | Q26462762 |
| End Cottage | II | The Street | | | 29 July 1988 | TL8725220332; 51°51′01″N 0°43′02″E | | 1337611 | Upload Photo | Q26622011 |
| Parish Church of All Saints | I | The Street | church building | | 21 December 1967 | TL8722020417; 51°51′03″N 0°43′01″E | | 1123841 | Parish Church of All Saints More images | Q17535925 |
| The Bell Inn | II | The Street | pub | | 1 February 1988 | TL8723620355; 51°51′01″N 0°43′01″E | | 1337610 | The Bell Inn More images | Q26622010 |
| Walberswick House | II | The Street | | | 21 December 1967 | TL8724520388; 51°51′02″N 0°43′02″E | | 1123840 | Upload Photo | Q26416930 |

== See also ==
- Grade I listed buildings in Essex
- Grade II* listed buildings in Essex

== Sources ==
- Bettley, James; Pevsner, Nikolaus (2007) [1954], Essex, The Buildings of England, New Haven and London: Yale University Press, ISBN 978-0-300-11614-4
