= Feering Halt railway station =

Former railway station in England

Feering Halt

General information
- Location: Feering, Braintree; England
- Coordinates: 51.8423°N 0.7118°E
- Grid reference: TQ869194
- Platforms: 1

Other information
- Status: Disused

History
- Original company: London and North Eastern Railway

Key dates
- 1 January 1934: Opened
- 7 May 1951: Closed
Location

Feering Halt was on the Kelvedon and Tollesbury Light Railway, serving the village of Feering, Essex.

The halt station was opened by the London and North Eastern Railway, which had acquired the Kelvedon and Tollesbury Light Railway upon the 1923 Grouping as part of the Great Eastern Railway.

The halt was closed, along with the rest of the line, on 7 May 1951.

| Preceding station | Disused railways | Following station |
|---|---|---|
| Kelvedon Low Level | London and North Eastern Railway; Kelvedon and Tollesbury Light Railway | Inworth |
