= Tollesbury Pier railway station =

Closed railway station in Essex, England

Coordinates: 51.7457°N 0.8549°E

Tollesbury Pier
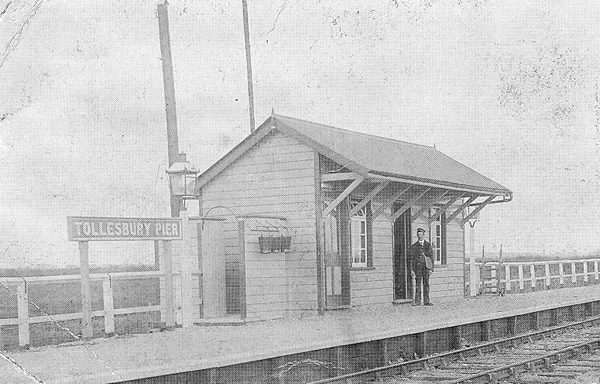
- The station in c. 1907

General information
- Location: Tollesbury, Maldon; England
- Platforms: 1

Other information
- Status: Disused

History
- Original company: Kelvedon and Tollesbury Light Railway
- Pre-grouping: Great Eastern Railway

Key dates
- 15 May 1907: Opened
- 18 July 1921: Closed
Location

Tollesbury Pier railway station was a short-lived terminus of an extension of the Kelvedon and Tollesbury Light Railway, serving Tollesbury's pier on the River Blackwater in Essex. The station was opened in 1907. The station was 10 miles 8 chains (16.25 km) from Kelvedon Low Level railway station.

The c. 1.5-mile extension from the existing terminus at Tollesbury to Tollesbury Pier never brought the expected traffic. During World War I the pier was used for troop training on the river and was subsequently closed to passengers in 1921. The government took over the pier during World War II and erected defences along it.

Preceding station	Disused railways	Following station
Tollesbury	Great Eastern Railway; Kelvedon and Tollesbury Light Railway	Terminus
