= Woodup Pool =

English salt water lake

Coordinates: 51.758942°N 0.849423°E

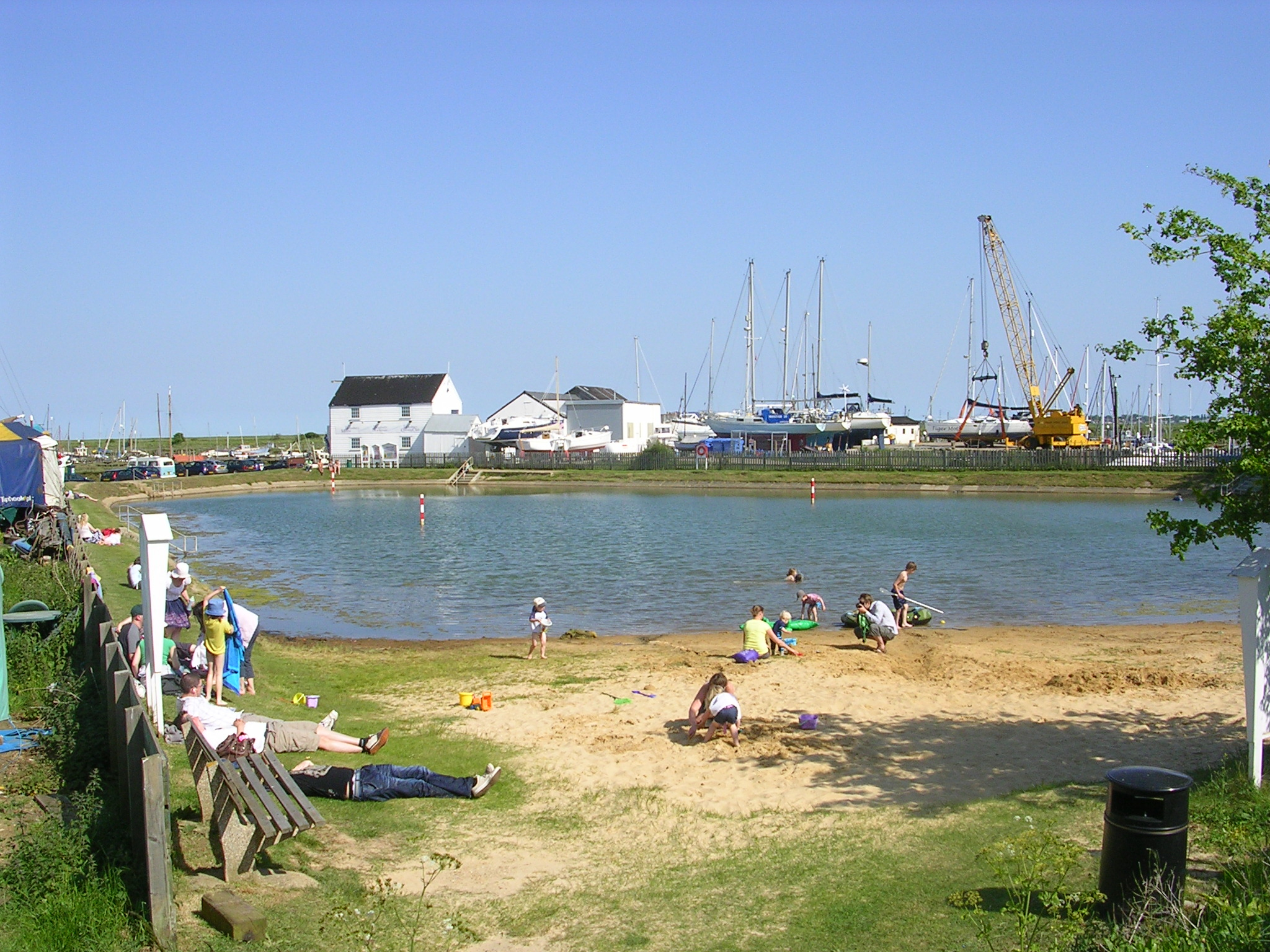
May 2009, Woodup Pool

Woodup Pool in Tollesbury, Essex (also known as Woodrolfe Pool) is a salt-water pond or lake used as an open-air swimming pool or amenity pool.

== History ==
The pool was opened in 1907 by Lady de Crespigny. In 1925 the pool was bought by Tollesbury Parish Council for £250. In 1934 Alexander Eaton drowned in the pool while on holiday with his fiancée.

== Description ==
This is a free public swimming lake next to Woodrolfe Park flats and Woodrolfe Creek. There are no lifeguards. The amenity pool is managed by the Woodup Pool Committee, Tollesbury Parish Council.
