= Briquetage =

Coarse ceramic material used to make evaporation vessels

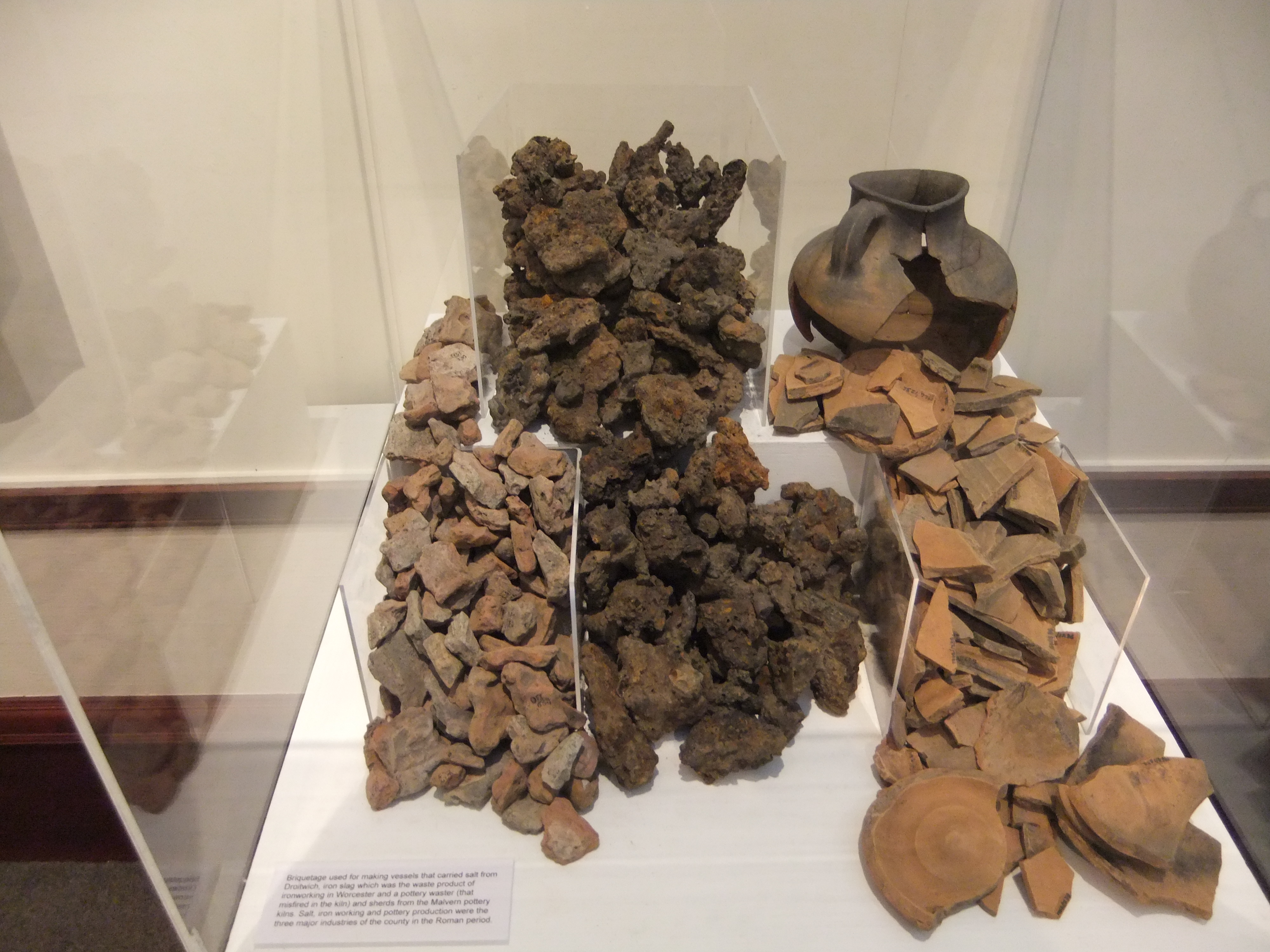
Briquetage, iron slag & sherds, Worcester City Art Gallery & Museum, England

Briquetage or very coarse pottery (VCP) is a coarse ceramic material used to make evaporation vessels and supporting pillars used in extracting salt from brine or seawater. Thick-walled saltpans were filled with saltwater and heated from below until the water had boiled away and salt was left behind. Often, the bulk of the water would be allowed to evaporate in salterns before the concentrated brine was transferred to a smaller briquetage vessel for final reduction. Once only salt was left, the briquetage vessels would have to be broken to remove the valuable commodity for trade. On the European continent, briquetage often took a columnar form which would have two small dimples on each end where the crystallised salt would collect.

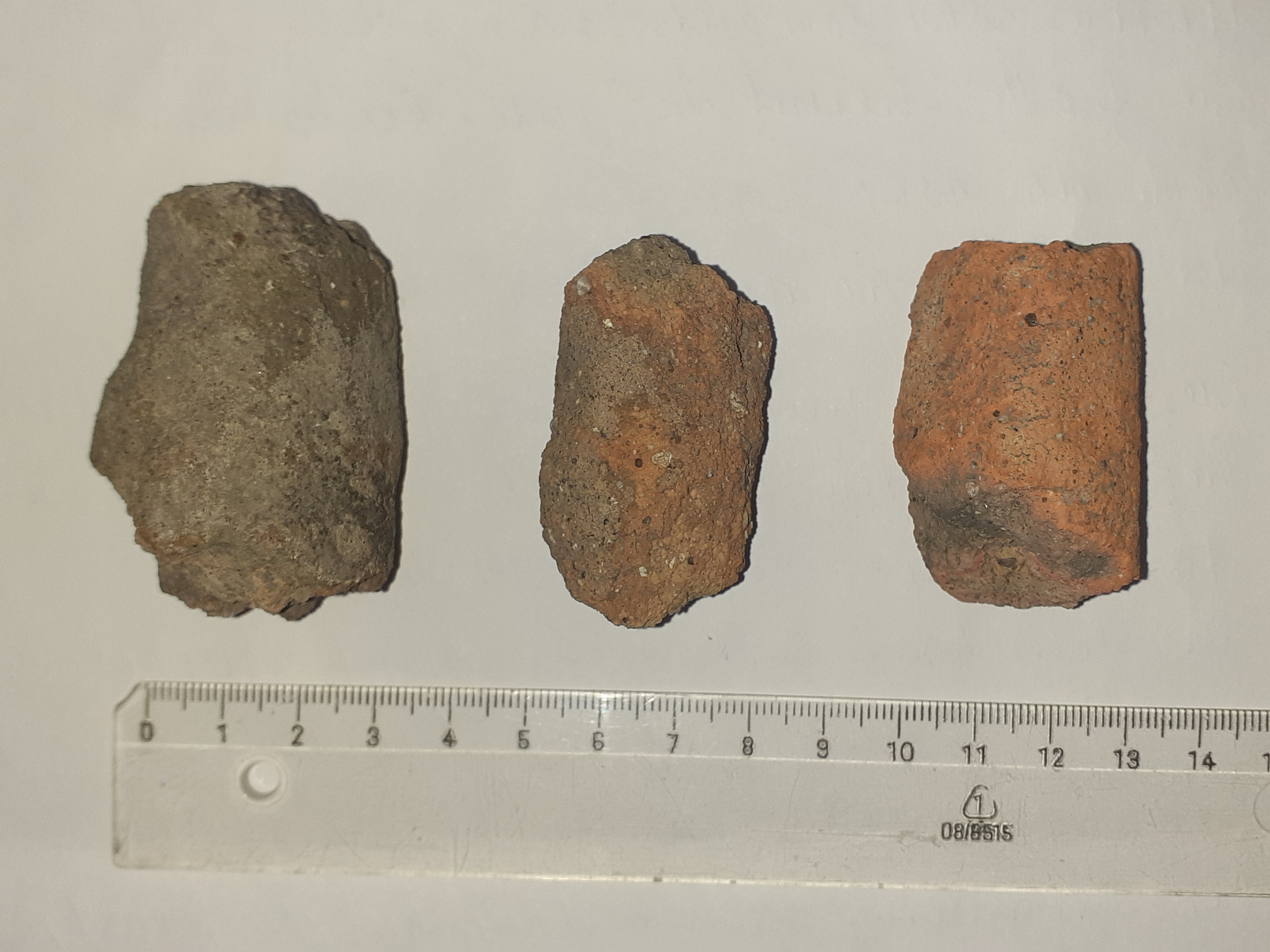
Columnar briquetage fragments from Germany

Broken briquetage material is found at multiple sites from the later Bronze Age in Europe into the medieval period and archaeologists have been able to identify different forms and fabrics of the pottery, allowing trade networks to be identified. Saltworking sites contain large quantities of the orange/red material and in Essex the mounds of briquetage are known as Red Hills. A recent discovery at the Poiana Slatinei archaeological site next to a salt spring in Lunca, Neamt County, Romania, indicates that Neolithic people of the Precucuteni Culture were boiling the salt-laden spring water through the process of briquetage to extract the salt as far back as 6050 BC, making it perhaps the oldest saltworks in history.
