= Saltern =

Area or installation for making salt

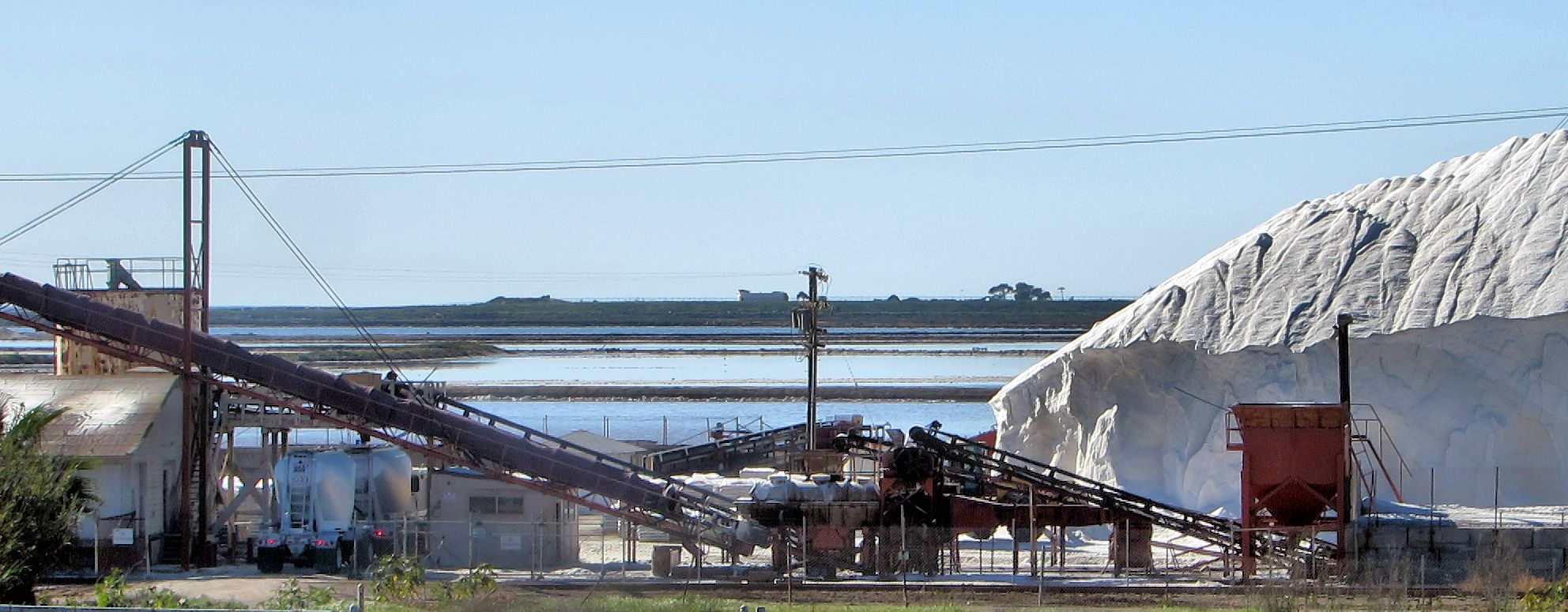
The South Bay Salt Works, a Californian saltern, with salt ponds.

A saltern is an area or installation for making salt. Salterns include modern salt-making works (saltworks), as well as hypersaline waters that usually contain high concentrations of halophilic microorganisms, primarily haloarchaea but also other halophiles including algae and bacteria.

Salterns usually begin with seawater as the initial source of brine but may also use natural saltwater springs and streams. The water is evaporated, usually over a series of ponds, to the point where sodium chloride and other salts precipitate out of the saturated brine, allowing pure salts to be harvested. Where complete evaporation in this fashion was not routinely achievable due to weather, salt was produced from the concentrated brine by boiling the brine.

== Background ==
Earliest examples of pans used in the solution mining of salt date back to prehistoric times and the pans were made of ceramics known as briquetage. Later examples were made from lead and then iron. The change from lead to iron coincided with a change from wood to coal for the purpose of heating the brine. Brine would be pumped into the pans, and concentrated by the heat of the fire burning underneath. As crystals of salt formed these would be raked out and more brine added. In warmer climates no additional heat would be supplied, the sun's heat being sufficient to evaporate off the brine.

One of the earliest salterns for the harvesting of salt is argued to have taken place on Xiechi Lake, Shanxi, China by 6000 BC. Strong archaeological evidence of salt making dating to 2000 BC is found in the ruins of Zhongba at Chongqing.

== See also ==
- Sodium chloride
- Alberger process
- Salt evaporation pond
- Seawater greenhouse
- History of salt
- Salt March (India)
- Red hill (salt making)
