= St Mary the Virgin Church, Kelvedon =

Grade I listed parish church in Braintree, Essex, UK

Coordinates: 51°50′05″N 0°41′35″E

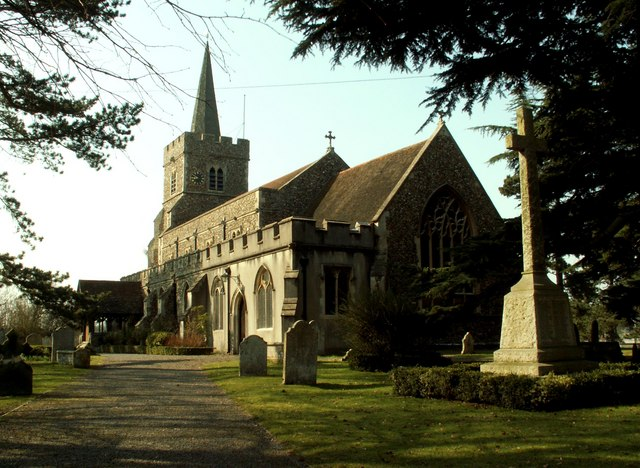
St Mary the Virgin, Kelvedon.

St Mary the Virgin Church is the Church of England parish church for Kelvedon in Essex. It stands at the south-west end of the village.

== History ==
The north-west corner of the nave was probably built early in the 12th century and consists of flint-rubble. A north aisle and arcade were added around 1230, followed by a south aisle (also with an arcade) around 1250. The chancel was extended around 1360 and a clerestory added in the 15th century. The north chapel and vestry date to early in the 16th century, whilst in the 19th century a south chapel was built and the south porch almost entirely rebuilt. The building was Grade I listed in 1967.
