= Brockwell Meadows =

Nature reserve in Essex, England

Coordinates: 51.834°N 0.7054°E

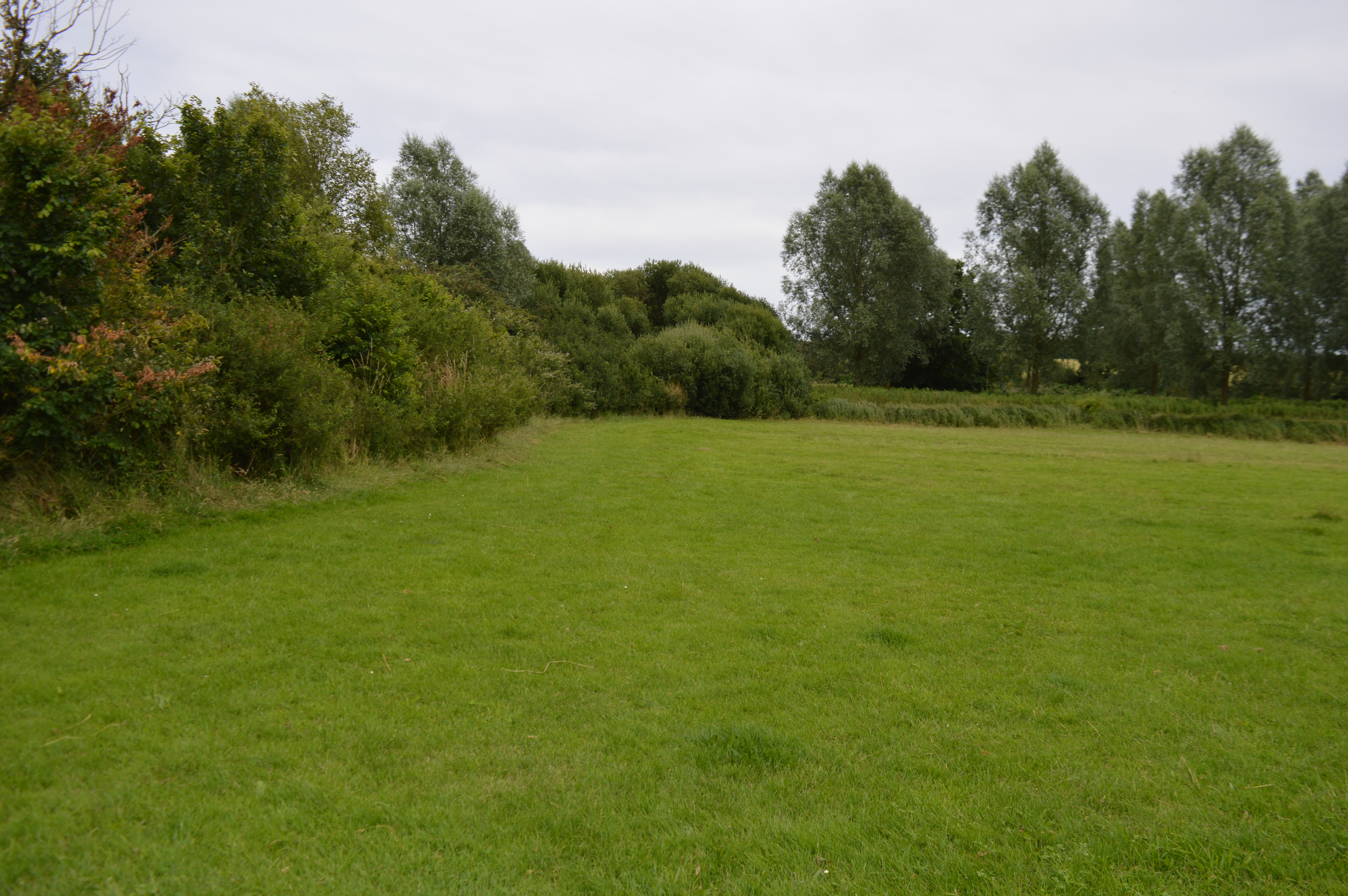
- Interactive map of Brockwell Meadows
- Type: Local Nature Reserve
- Location: Kelvedon, Essex
- OS grid: TL865185
- Area: 4.3 hectares (11 acres)
- Manager: Kelvedon Parish Council

Brockwell Meadows is a 4.3 hectare Local Nature Reserve in Kelvedon in Essex. It is owned by Kelevdon Parish Council and managed by the Council together with a group of local residents called the Brockwell Group.

This site has water meadow, woodland, a pond and hedgerows. The River Blackwater runs along the eastern boundary.

There is access from Riverside Way.
