= Feering =

Village in Essex, England

Coordinates: 51.851°N 0.718°E

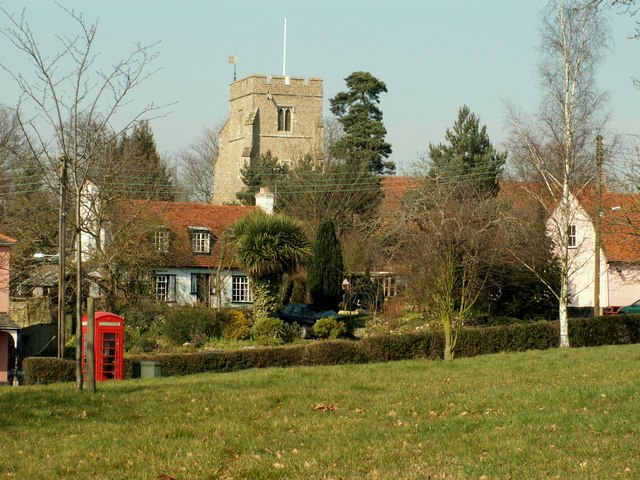
- All Saints' Church, Feering

- Location within Essex
- Population: 2,103 (Parish, 2021)
- OS grid reference: TL871204
- District: Braintree
- Shire county: Essex
- Region: East
- Country: England
- Sovereign state: United Kingdom
- Post town: COLCHESTER
- Postcode district: CO5
- Dialling code: 01376
- Police: Essex
- Fire: Essex
- Ambulance: East of England
- UK Parliament: Witham

Feering is a village and civil parish in the Braintree district of Essex, England. The parish is between Colchester and Witham. The village, which lies at the south-west edge of the parish, is conjoined to the neighbouring village of Kelvedon. Within the parish are the hamlets of Stocks Green, Skye Green and Langley Green. At the 2021 census the parish had a population of 2,103.

== Amenities ==
Feering village has two public houses, the Sun Inn and The Bell Inn, and a restaurant, The Blue Anchor which also functions as a hotel. The Blue Anchor was previously The Old Anchor which, on 14 July 2008, suffered major damage caused by a fire which required eight fire crews to contain and lasted over 3 hours. Prested Hall is an historic house which dates back the 14th Century and which now provides hotel accommodation for special events.

Large businesses have offices or trade points in Feering. The nearest post office and convenience store to the village is in Kelvedon; the Old Post Office and shop which was situated on the village green ceased trading in the early 2000s.

The village has footpath links which run through surrounding fields and rural landscape. The Essex Way is not far from the Northern boundary of the parish.

== Transport ==
Feering is close to the A12 and M11 (the latter via the A120). The village has recently been affected by the A120 proposal to construct a dual carriageway to the north of the village. This extension of the dual carriageway section of the A120 will stretch from the current A12 near Marks Tey to Braintree. The Highways Agency has not released information concerning new routes, which has angered some local residents, who oppose the new proposals.

From 1904 to 1951 the village was served by a halt on the Kelvedon and Tollesbury Light Railway.

== Religion ==
The ecclesiastical parish Church of All Saints is part of the United Benefice of Kelvedon and Feering. The church provides two services, Holy Communion on Sundays, and Family Services monthly. The church has stood at the centre of Feering village for 850 years, and is an English Heritage Grade I listed building.

Feering Mission is an independent village church, opened in October 1907, on Little Tey Road. It is part of the Fellowship for Evangelising Britain's Villages (FEBV). The church currently serves the local community, working closely with the Scope Home Drummonds, Feering Childminders' Association, and Feering Primary School, and has a link with Co-op funeral services in Kelvedon.
