= Tollesbury =

Village in Essex, England

Coordinates: 51.76°N 0.84°E

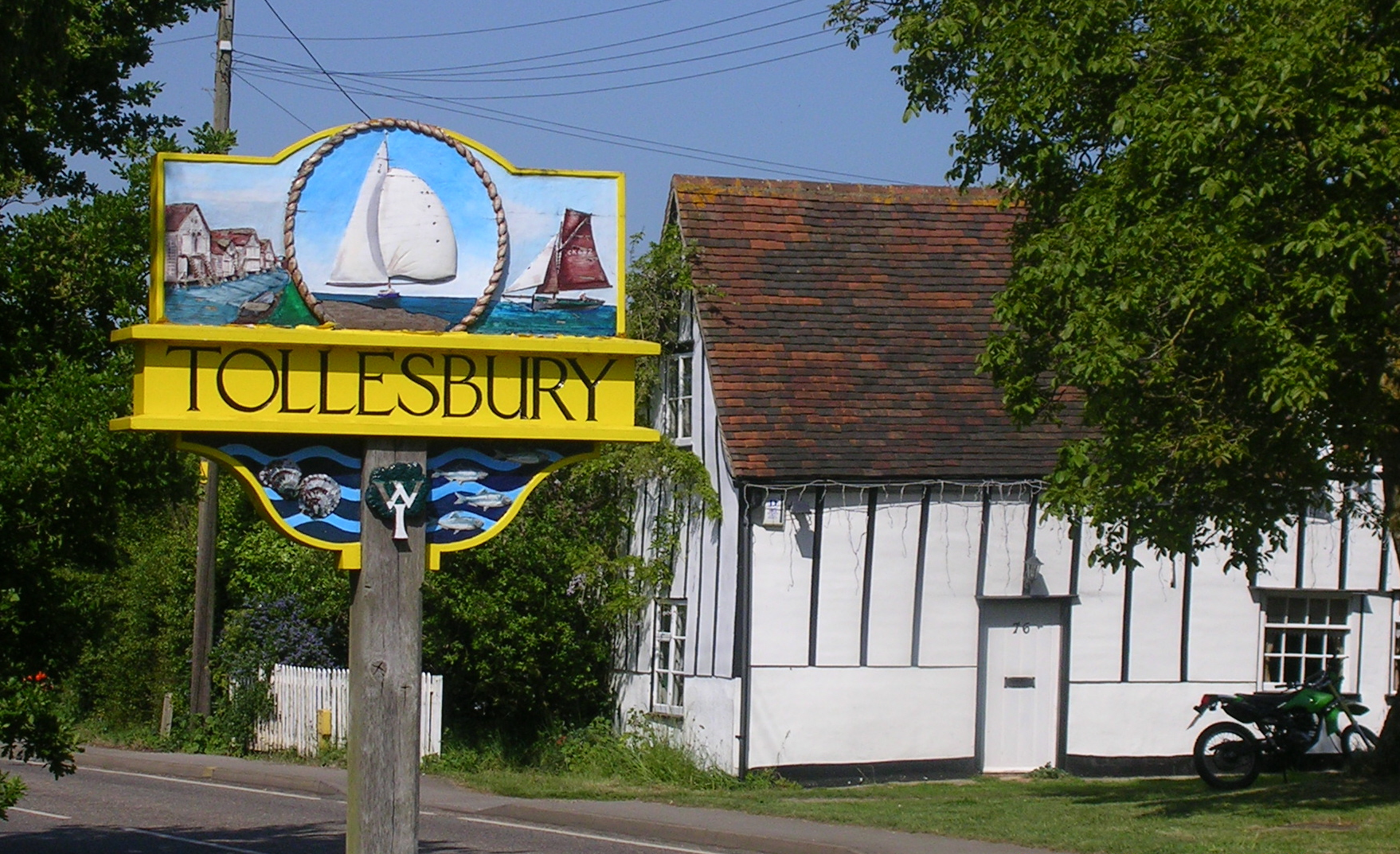
- Tollesbury Village sign

- Location within Essex
- Population: 2,810 (Parish, 2021)
- OS grid reference: TL958101
- Civil parish: Tollesbury
- District: Maldon
- Shire county: Essex
- Region: East
- Country: England
- Sovereign state: United Kingdom
- Post town: Maldon
- Postcode district: CM9
- Dialling code: 01621
- Police: Essex
- Fire: Essex
- Ambulance: East of England
- UK Parliament: Witham

Tollesbury is a village and civil parish in the Maldon District of Essex, England. It lies on the coast at the mouth of the River Blackwater. It is situated 9 miles (14 km) east of the historic port of Maldon and 12 miles (19 km) south of Colchester. At the 2021 census the parish had a population of 2,810.

For centuries Tollesbury, the village of the plough and sail, relied on the harvests of the land and the sea. The main trade and export of Tollesbury, which still thrives to this day, has long been oysters.

== The village sign ==
On the 'Plough' side of the carved village sign, situated on West Street, the ploughman and his team of horses are depicted working the land, agriculture goes on down to the water's edge. Pictured on the right of the sign are fishing smacks on the River Blackwater. The village church can be seen on the top left side of the sign. A mallard and a hare are pictured on the supports.

The 'Sail' side of the sign shows the weather-boarded sail lofts. The centre of the sign shows the yacht 'Endeavour II' which was the 1937 British challenger for the America's Cup, while on the left is depicted the fishing smack 'Sallie'. Oysters and fish, harvests from the Blackwater, are shown on the supports.

The sign was painted by Sam Rigby, a Tollesbury artist.

== Features of the village ==
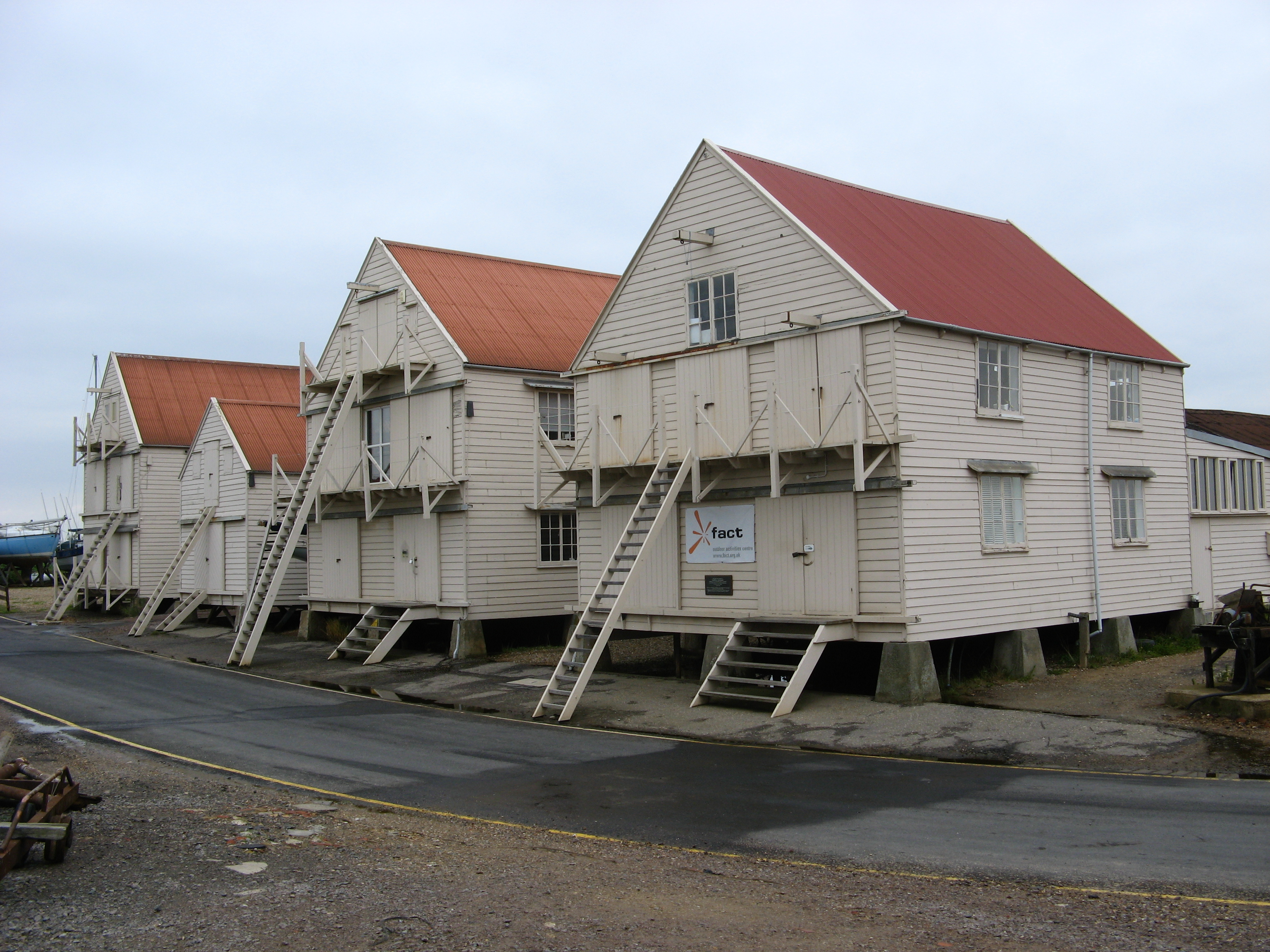
Renovated yacht stores at Woodrolfe Creek

At one time Tollesbury was served by six public houses, but the village has only one open at present: The King's Head. Other social establishments include The Royal British Legion, the Tollesbury Cruising club and the Tollesbury Sailing club.

At the centre of the village is 'The Square', which was also known as 'The Green' but correctly called Church Street. On the west side of the Square is the Grade II listed King's Head Public House, which was traditionally the seafarers' public house. It was here that the Tollesbury Yacht Skippers Club was formed when the village was gaining a reputation as a yachting centre during the early part of the 20th century. Alterations were made to the pub in 1902 during which parts of a copy of the Great Bible of 1540 were found in the attic. On the east side of the Square is Saint Mary's church.

Cottages line either side of the Square, some of which have been built using bricks which were manufactured locally.

At Woodrolfe Creek the Woodup Pool is a public salt water lido, which opened in 1907.

== History ==
From 1904 to 1951 Tollesbury was served by the Kelvedon and Tollesbury Light Railway, with a small station on the north side of the village. The railway continued to Tollesbury Pier 2 kilometres (1.2 mi) south-east of the village, where promoters hoped to develop land for bungalows, houses, and a yacht station. However these plans come to little, and the Tollesbury Pier extension closed in 1921. During the Second World War the pier was destroyed as an anti-invasion precaution, and the area used for defensive guns and to control electrically operated mines blocking the River Blackwater estuary. In 1943 a Halifax bomber carrying French SOE agents crashed in the river nearby.

Tucked away in the south east corner of the Square, by the church wall, stands the 18th-century village lock-up or Cage. This wooden building would have been where drunks were held until they sobered up. With the village having six public houses at one stage, the Lock-up probably saw quite a bit of business itself. The cage has been Grade II listed since 1959.

== The Tollesbury Murder ==
In 1851 a murder in the village captured the nation's attention through the pages of both local and national presses. Mrs Cobb of East Street, wife of James Cobb, dredgerman, was brutally murdered in her bed whilst a young girl lay by her side asleep. An inquest was arranged in the King's Head, and it was well attended. The villagers quickly seized on the notion that Henry Harrington, a farm labourer from beyond the village, was the culprit but, with only circumstantial evidence submitted, he was acquitted at the assizes held at the Shire Hall, Chelmsford, on 6 March 1852. This story has been retold by historian Shaun Villiers Everett.

== Parish church ==
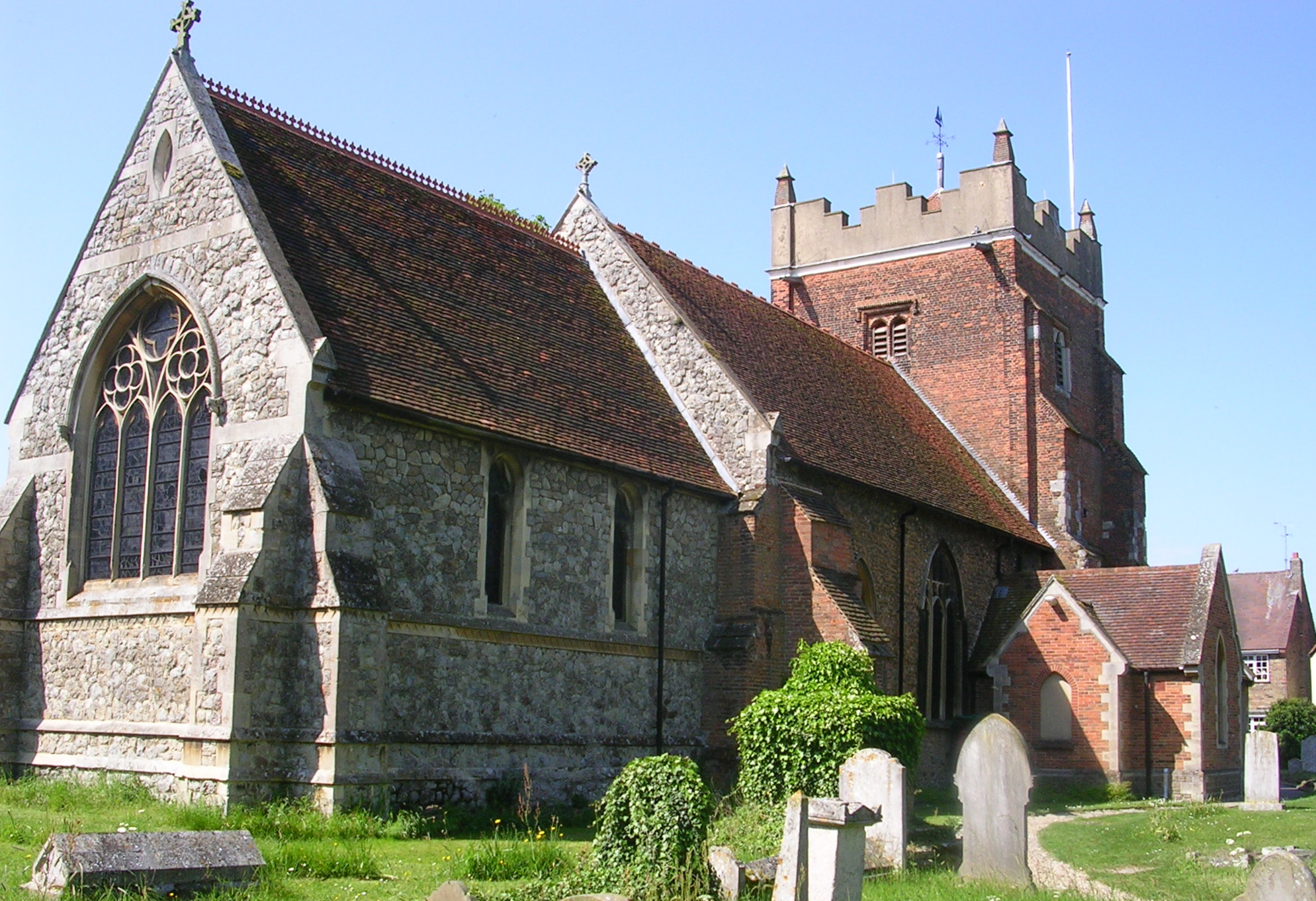
Saint Mary's church

The parish church of Tollesbury, dedicated to Saint Mary the Virgin, stands at the highest point in the village. The church was built in the late 11th century, possibly on the site of an earlier Anglo-Saxon church.

In medieval times the parish church was the property of Saint Mary's nunnery at Barking, and the nunnery was responsible for the appointment of the clergyman to the parish. When the nunnery was dissolved by Henry VIII in 1539, the manor was given to Thomas Cromwell a few days before he was made Earl of Essex. The gift of the living has passed through many hands, and now rests with Exeter College, Oxford and the Bishop of Chelmsford. The tower of the church is an imposing structure and it may well be that here was a place of refuge for parishioners in time of attack from marauders across the North Sea.

The lowest stage of the tower dates from the 11th century and consists of rubble, flint and conglomerate walling with freestone quoins. The doorway is typical of the Tudor period. Above this stage are two more windows with 15th-century brickwork. The largest window in the tower is in the perpendicular style and the highest windows of brick were shaped in Tudor times. The tower is capped by parapet walls and pinnacles dating from the 17th century. Buttresses are made from flint and brick.

The grave of Admiral Sir Thomas Hugh Binney, KCB, KCMG, DSO (9 December 1883 – 8 January 1953), a senior officer in the Royal Navy and the 16th Governor of Tasmania, lies in the churchyard.

== Congregational Church ==
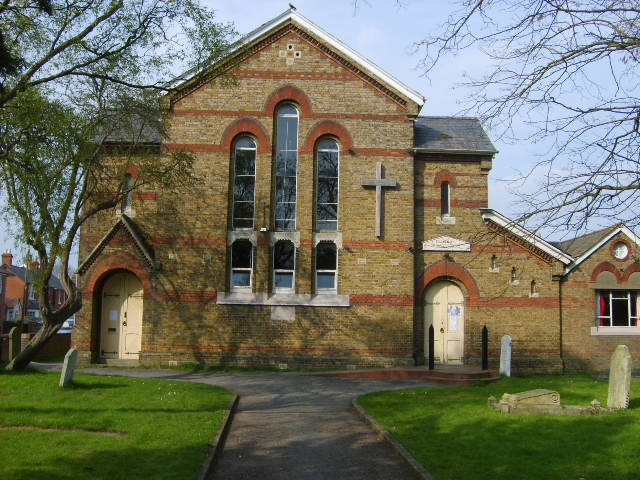
Tollesbury Congregational Church

The other large church in Tollesbury opposite the square is the Congregational Church. Tradition accords the foundation of Tollesbury Congregational Church to 1803. However, the church records show that the Independent cause in Tollesbury was already under discussion in the years preceding. A meeting was held in Witham in December 1802, to consider the subject, including the purchase or hire of a building for public worship in Tollesbury. About this time, Mr Rudkin of Abbots Hall purchased a cottage in Tollesbury and fitted it up for worship, which was served regularly by William Merchant of Layer Breton and Mr. Forster. However, this cottage was found 'highly inconvenient, and indeed from its extreme heat through the multitude which attended, dangerous', so a new meeting house was erected in 1803 and the Revd Mr. Harding of Duxford nominated as minister.

A Declaration of Faith was laid down in 1824, administered by the minister, Revd John Trew, and Revd William Merchant. Several ministers succeeded Trew until March 1850, when Revd John Spurgeon, father of Charles Haddon Spurgeon, was appointed. His ministry extended to 1863 when he was followed by Revd William Marker Anstey of Fakenham. Two years after his appointment, a new chapel and minister's house were built, and in subsequent years the school room was twice enlarged. William Basil Anstey of Leyton Congregational Church succeeded his father as minister in 1893 and served the church until 1920. A number of ministers followed, until the ministry of Revd David Bentley, who witnessed the 150th anniversary of the church in 1953. The church affiliated to the United Reformed Church in October 1972, but seceded in May 1983, when it rejoined the Congregational Federation. Usually in Congregationalism there is a minister who heads up a team of people, often called deacons, who administer and lead the church. Currently there is no minister in situ here, but there is a team of deacons in place who oversee the church.

== Tollesbury Granary ==
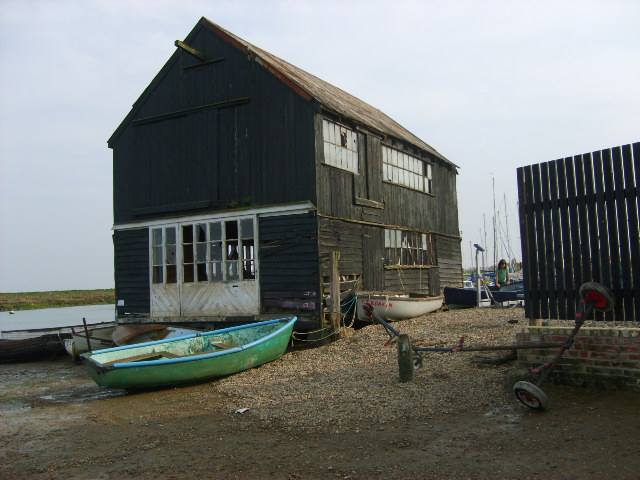
Tollesbury Granary

In 2006, the Granary building by Woodrolfe Creek was a regional runner-up in the BBC Restoration Village competition. It has been on Essex County Council's Buildings at Risk Register since 1992.

== Tollesbury Wick Marshes ==
Tollesbury Wick is a nature reserve just east of Tolleshunt run by the Essex Wildlife Trust. The reserve occupies 240 hectares (590 acres) of grazing marsh, reed beds, saltmarsh and mudflats. The marshes were once part of a thriving salt-production industry during the Iron Age and Roman periods, and Red hills created by this process are found across the area.

== Filming Location ==
The village has frequently been used as a filming location for high-profile dramas. Series filmed in Tollesbury include Liar and Great Expectations.

== 1972 Pop Festival Panic ==
In 1972, Hunt's farm in Tollesbury was one of a number of sites being considered by Great Western Festivals Ltd as the location for a pop festival over the spring bank holiday. By the end of March the company had decided that the location was unsuitable, but not before local people had protested by hanging effigies of the organisers (former diplomat Lord Harlech and the film actor Stanley Baker) in the village square. Michael Attfield, chairman of the Tollesbury Association, was reported as saying that the Association would be pleased to let any other village "threatened" by the GWF festival have the results of what had been learned during the protest campaign. The festival finally went ahead at Bardney, Lincolnshire as the Great Western Express Festival.

== Nearby places ==
- Maldon
- Tiptree
- Tolleshunt D'Arcy
- Tolleshunt Knights
- Goldhanger
