= Red hill (salt making) =

Red Hill is an archaeological term in Britain for a small mound with a reddish colour found in the coastal and tidal river areas of East Anglia and Essex. Red Hills are formed as a result of generations of salt making, deriving their colour from the rubble of clay structures used in the salt-making process that have been scorched red by fires used to evaporate sea water to make salt cakes. They date from the Bronze Age, Iron Age and into the Roman period.

== Archaeological investigation ==
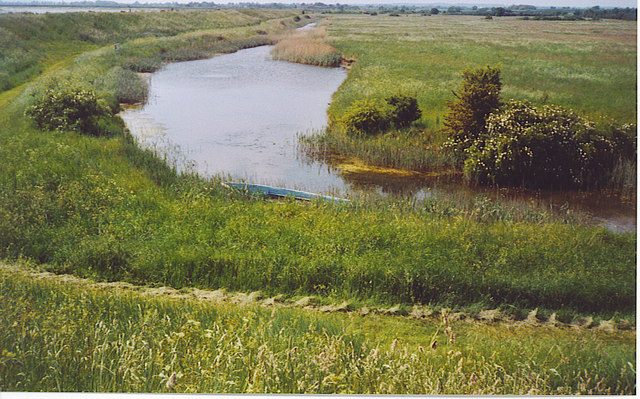
Remains of a Red Hill in marshland close to Tolleshunt D'Arcy, Essex.

Small red mounds had been a noticeable feature of the coastal landscape in Essex and East Anglia for many centuries, but the first archaeological investigation into Red Hills and their function was not until 1879, when William Stopes excavated a group of them near Peldon, on the Essex mainland opposite Mersea Island. Originally Stopes thought that the mounds were Medieval in date, and were used for producing alkalis for glass making. However other investigations, such as that by John Christopher Atkinson, who compared them to similar mounds in Yorkshire, saw the mounds as prehistoric or Roman in date.

In 1906 the Essex Archaeological Society and Essex Field Club created the Red Hills Exploration Committee to identify the purpose, age and extent of the Red Hills, undertaking excavations at Langenhoe and Goldhanger, and later in 1909 at Canewdon on the River Crouch. Conclusions as to the exact nature of the type of activity carried out at the Red Hills were still lacking however, with archaeologist Flinders Petrie suggesting that the sites were where kelp and seaweed had been burned in order to create alkali solutions for soap and glass, whilst other archaeologists suggested pottery kilns. However some early comparisons to salt-processing sites in Brittany in the early Twentieth century lead to tentative suggestions that salt was at the heart of the Red Hills' purpose, with further excavations in Britain of sites similar to the Red Hills of Essex and East Anglia at Ingoldmells in Lincolnshire and Hook in Hampshire choosing this interpretation over the alkali explanation.

Ernest Linder's 1937–1941 excavations of Red Hills at Canvey Island in South Essex began to draw upon salt-making as the main suggestion for what had been occurring at these mounds. During the 1950s, 1960s, 1970s and 1980s further excavations were carried out around Southend-on-Sea and Canvey Island in South Essex, around the Dengie peninsula and Maldon in central Essex, and around Harwich and the Blackwater and Colne estuaries in North-East Essex. Red Hills and salt making at Salthouse (Norfolk) were also described by Hoskins. During these investigations much information was gathered both on the date and purpose of the Red Hills.

== Description and purpose ==
=== Description ===
Over 300 Red Hills have been identified so far, mostly along the Essex and Norfolk coasts, with others in Suffolk and Kent. The vast majority of Red Hills are located on low-lying coastal flats in tidal estuaries and in back-waters like Hamford Water between Harwich and Walton-on-the-Naze in Essex. They take the form of low mounds, ranging in size from about 200 square metres (equivalent to a 16m diameter circle) to a hectare (equiv. to a 115m diameter circle). William Stopes identified one on Mersea Island near the Strood Channel which was 30 acres in size, but acknowledged that it may have consisted of more than one mound. The height of many mounds has been much truncated by ploughing, with others located close to rivers and the sea either being eroded away or covered with alluvial silt, but an average sized mound at Peldon in Essex, 0.2 acres in size, still stands at a height of roughly 1.3m (meaning a volume of about 1000 cu metres, equivalent to 1500 tons of earth).

The strata of the mounds is made up of tips of briquetage (broken fragments of fired clay from hearths, evaporation pans and other salt-making furniture which give the mound its red colouration), ash, charcoal and unfired clay. Most have large pits cut into the ground around them that have been lined with clay to produce a water-tight tank.

=== Features ===
Several structures relating to salt production are found at Red Hills, whose purpose in the process is inferred from archaeological analysis and from analogies to Medieval and more recent techniques for obtaining sea salt.

==== Settling tanks ====
Rows of oval clay-lined pits dug into the alluvium around the Red Hills are interpreted as tanks for holding sea water. These tanks are usually in groups, with those found at Red Hills at Goldhanger, Maldon, and at Leigh Beck at Canvey Island consisting of groups of three. Most tanks are between 1 and 2m in diameter, and around 1m deep, with a potential holding capacity of over 1000 litres.

==== Hearths ====
In situ hearths are relatively rare at Red Hill sites. Parts of hearth substructures were found at the Red Hills on Osea Road near Maldon and at Tollesbury in Essex, whilst the first identifiable hearth was found at Peldon close to the central settling tank in a group of three. This consisted of a subrectangular 1.8m x 0.8m clay walled structure, surviving to 0.4m high, with evidence of multiple firings. Other hearths containing Roman tile have been found at Leigh Beck on Canvey Island, and others have been located at Red Hills along Fenn Creek near South Woodham Ferrers.

==== Flues ====
Flue ducts for directing hot gas from fires to heat chambers have been found at some sites, but are very rare. At the Goldhanger VIII Red Hill nine flues and two fire-floors on top of the Red Hill mound, suggesting that they post-date most of the activity on the site.

==== Briquetage ====
Briquetage refers to the broken fragments of clay structures found in great quantities at Red Hill sites. Much of this material is locally made and of a crude quality, suggesting that it was expedient. Although some of the clay appears to have been fired in a kiln, much of it is bonfire-made. The redness of the material is created during its use, as the iron oxide content of the clay is converted to red iron ferric oxide in an atmosphere containing a surplus of oxygen. Some briquetage has lost its red colouration during its use as part of the salt evaporation furniture, turning grey, purple or brown. 90 per cent of briquetage consists of flat faced rectangular slabs of varying sizes, which can be reconstructed into large, rectangular clay vessels and trays. Some examples from Langenhoe and Peldon have decorated rims.

Other examples of briquetage include pedestals and T-shapes, believed to have held the rectangular clay vessels above fires, triangular fire-bars 20–40 cm in size that may suspended vessels above fires, triangular or plectrum-shaped wedges and long clay rods of unknown purposes, and pinch-props, small lumps of briquetage that have a flat base and at least one other facet, possibly used to mend clay vessels.

=== Purpose ===
The interpretation of these features as salt-making sites comes from the discovery of these features and artefacts associated with them. The briquetage and signs of burning at all Red Hills are taken as evidence that intensive use of fires took place on the sites. Red Hills are found in close proximity to sources of salt water, and since Red Hills have clay-lined tanks for holding liquids associated with them, this is seen as an important fluid used in the activities which took place at the mounds. The charcoal, red-scorching, and fired clay briquetage is seen as evidence that fires and heating took place at the mounds, and so, since some of the briquetage has traces of green-glaze on its surfaces caused by the vitrification of clay with salt acting as a fluxing agent, the suggestion that salt water, stored in the water-tight tanks, was being heated in clay trays to obtain salt as the end product is seen as the most likely purpose of the Red Hills. Other industrial activities such as pottery making and metal working are seen as less likely due to the lack of any supporting evidence for such processes.

== Function ==
Red Hills are located on low-lying land close to marshes, estuaries and tidal bays, with rivers such as the Crouch and Roach, which have low freshwater outflows, having Red Hills far inland along their tidal estuaries. Use of the Red Hill sites is believed to have been seasonal, with activity occurring from Spring until the end of Summer. The drier conditions of Spring allow for the construction of the clay structures for the season (which if constructed in damp conditions would have cracked when fired), and the collection of fire-wood. Analysis of the charred remains of fire-wood from Red Hills sites suggests that coppiced wood was used in the fires at the site, an activity that in itself required careful management over time.

Sea-water may have been collected in tidally-fed sun pans cut into tidal channels to allow for solar evaporation in the initial stages of the process, although no such features have been positively identified. Instead, sea water seems to have been collected in the clay-lined settling tanks, which were submerged by the high-tide or were filled manually when the tide was lower. The depth of these tanks suggests that they were designed to allow the alluvial mud and other unwanted solids in the water to settle to the bottom, to be emptied out later. As this settling procedure could take several hours, having more than one tank allowed for them to be at different stages of the settling process, meaning that salt making could continue with little down-time.

Sea-water contains around 3.5 percent solids on average, 2.7 percent being salt, with 96.5ccs of sea-water having to be evaporated in order to obtain 2.7 g of salt. This would have been done by transferring water from the tanks to large rectangular trays suspended over fires that would have evaporated off the water. For the first batch of water the tray would have been filled before the fire was lit, to reduce the risk of cracking, after which water would have been constantly added from the tanks whilst salt crystals would have been constantly ladled out. Lime and gypsum hard-scale would form first, as pan-scale at the base of the trays. Then, as the salt content in the trays rose from 2.7 per cent to 28 it would start to form crystals in the boiling water (meaning that 90ccs out of an original 100ccs of water would have needed to evaporate before salt crystals form).

Removing crystals before all of the water had evaporated from the tray was the intention, as it meant that impurities would have been left in the tray and the process could be continued all day without having to close the evaporation process down whilst salt was collected. In theory the tray vessel could have been topped up with water roughly one hundred times before the concentration of the bittern impurities and pan-scale left behind became too high. The salt crystals ladled out of the trays would have been placed in drying vessels and baskets close to a source of heat. From this "salt cakes" would be created, ready for transportation.

== See also ==
- Saltern
