= Kelvedon =

Village in Essex, England

Coordinates: 51.833°N 0.699°E

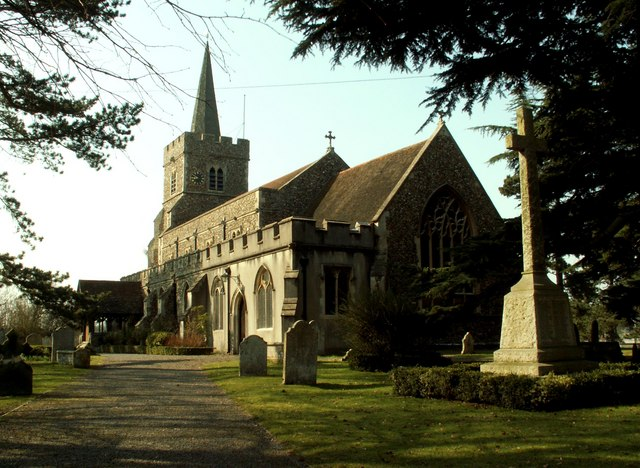
- St Mary the Virgin Church, Kelvedon

- Location within Essex
- Population: 3,648 (Parish, 2021)
- OS grid reference: TL861184
- Civil parish: Kelvedon
- District: Braintree
- Shire county: Essex
- Region: East
- Country: England
- Sovereign state: United Kingdom
- Post town: COLCHESTER
- Postcode district: CO5
- Dialling code: 01376
- Police: Essex
- Fire: Essex
- Ambulance: East of England
- UK Parliament: Witham

Kelvedon is a village and civil parish in the Braintree District of Essex, England. It lies 9 miles (14 km) south-west of Colchester, its post town, and 12 miles (19 km) north-east of the county town of Chelmsford. At the 2021 census the parish had a population of 3,648. Kelvedon and the neighbouring village of Feering now form a single built-up area.

Kelvedon is now home to several businesses including Knight Group and Lysanda. Brockwell Meadows Local Nature Reserve is south-east of the village between a housing estate and the River Blackwater.

== History ==
There is evidence of human habitation in the Kelvedon area stretching back to the Mesolithic era. By the late Iron Age, there was an extensive settlement in the area. A warrior burial dated to 75–72 BC has been excavated in the area, and described as a "nationally important" find.

During the Roman period, the settlement developed into a small Roman town, located on the main road from Londinium to Camulodunum, called Canonium. Excavations on the site have discovered Roman round houses and coins. During the Flavian period Canonium was home to a significant metalworking industry, while in the 3rd and 4th centuries the site was primarily given over to an inhumation cemetery. As with most Roman-British urban sites, Canonium lost its urban character in the sub-Roman period.

The existing village of Kelvedon has been a settlement since the Early Middle Ages. The area fell under the Danelaw, and a rare brooch found in 2025 provided the first archaeological evidence for Viking activity in the area. By the time of the Domesday Book in 1086, the parish had a population of 45 households; ownership was split between two manors, held by Westminster Abbey and Hugh de Montfort.

The earliest surviving part of its parish church, St Mary the Virgin Church probably dates to the early 12th century. The village's first school, Ayletts Foundation School, was founded by Thomas Aylett in Maldon Road, Kelvedon, in 1632 when he bequeathed the property along with £10 per annum to provide a salary for a master.

The village is bounded to the north by the River Blackwater where the adjacent village of Feering starts. The River Blackwater was spanned by a packhorse bridge, built around 1750, which was an essential part of the main road carrying traffic from Norfolk and Suffolk to London and this feature was significant in making Kelvedon an important staging post on the main route to London, as could be seen from the numerous inns and hostelries which served the area. The village also has a road bridge, built in c. 1839, after the previous bridge was washed away by flooding, and is now Grade II listed.

Kelvedon expanded significantly in the Victorian era. The reason was the Norwich to London railway making it a place to live yet get to work as rail was the only fast method of transport. Victorian Kelvedon was set along one street, High Street. In the late 19th century, Kelvedon became famous for seed growing, and the firm of Kings Seeds, now part of Associated British Foods, became famous for the production of flower and vegetable seeds. Another large seed merchant, based nearby in the hamlet of Inworth, and trading worldwide was E W Deal & Sons (a founder member of Asmer Seeds based in Leicester) who were famous for developing the Kelvedon Wonder Pea and other varieties of flowers and vegetables.

In the 1930s, with the advent of the automobile, High Street became the A12, the main road through Essex. Ribbon development saw houses sprawl along the road for miles. Ayletts Foundation School closed in 1944, though its building still stands and now houses the Kelvedon Library and Museum. It was replaced by the Kelvedon St Mary's School, a Church of England primary school located on the corner of High Street and Easterford Road (now the Kelvedon and Feering Health Centre and a private residence). It was in turn replaced in 1977 by a new school located in Docwra Road, also called Kelvedon St Marys. This school converted to academy status in March 2013. The village suffered major congestion until a bypass was built in the 1960s diverting the A12 past the village. Suburbanization started to take place in the 1980s when a large development, called Riverside Park, was constructed adding hundreds of homes to the village envelope.

The Office for National Statistics now classes the neighbouring villages of Kelvedon and Feering as forming a single built up area, which it calls "Kelvedon and Feering". This built up area had a population of 4,870 at the 2021 census.

== Transport ==
Kelvedon railway station is on the Great Eastern Main Line between London Liverpool Street and Ipswich. Passenger trains, operated by Greater Anglia, generally run half-hourly in each way to Liverpool Street southbound and to Colchester railway station and Ipswich northbound. With a minimum journey time of 47 minutes to Liverpool Street, Kelvedon is a desirable location for commuters working in the city of London.

Bus services are provided by the 71 First Bus service between Chelmsford and Colchester and the 91 Hedingham & District service between Tollesbury and Witham.

Kelvedon is located beside the A12 dual carriageway, which connects east London with Lowestoft; it therefore has good road links with the rest of East Anglia.

== Notable residents ==
- Susanna Corder (1787–1864), educationist and Quaker biographer was born here.
- C.H. Spurgeon, known as the "Prince of Preachers", was born in Kelvedon on 19 June 1834. Charles Spurgeon was a powerful preacher of the Victorian era and boasted the largest congregation in London, to the extent that his weekly sermon was printed and sold by the thousands. The Metropolitan Tabernacle was built for him. Charles Spurgeon never returned to Kelvedon to preach although he was invited in 1853 to do so in the new Independent Chapel built in the village, an invitation which he refused. There is a blue plaque on a building in Kelvedon High Street commemorating the place of his birth.
- Actress Juliet Stevenson was born in Kelvedon.
- Actor Jeremy Sheffield spent part of his childhood living in Kelvedon.
- Singer/Actor/Television Show Judge Zoe Tyler lived in Kelvedon
- Actor John Dagleish was born and raised in Kelvedon.
