= Kelvedon Low Level railway station =

Former railway station in England

Kelvedon Low Level
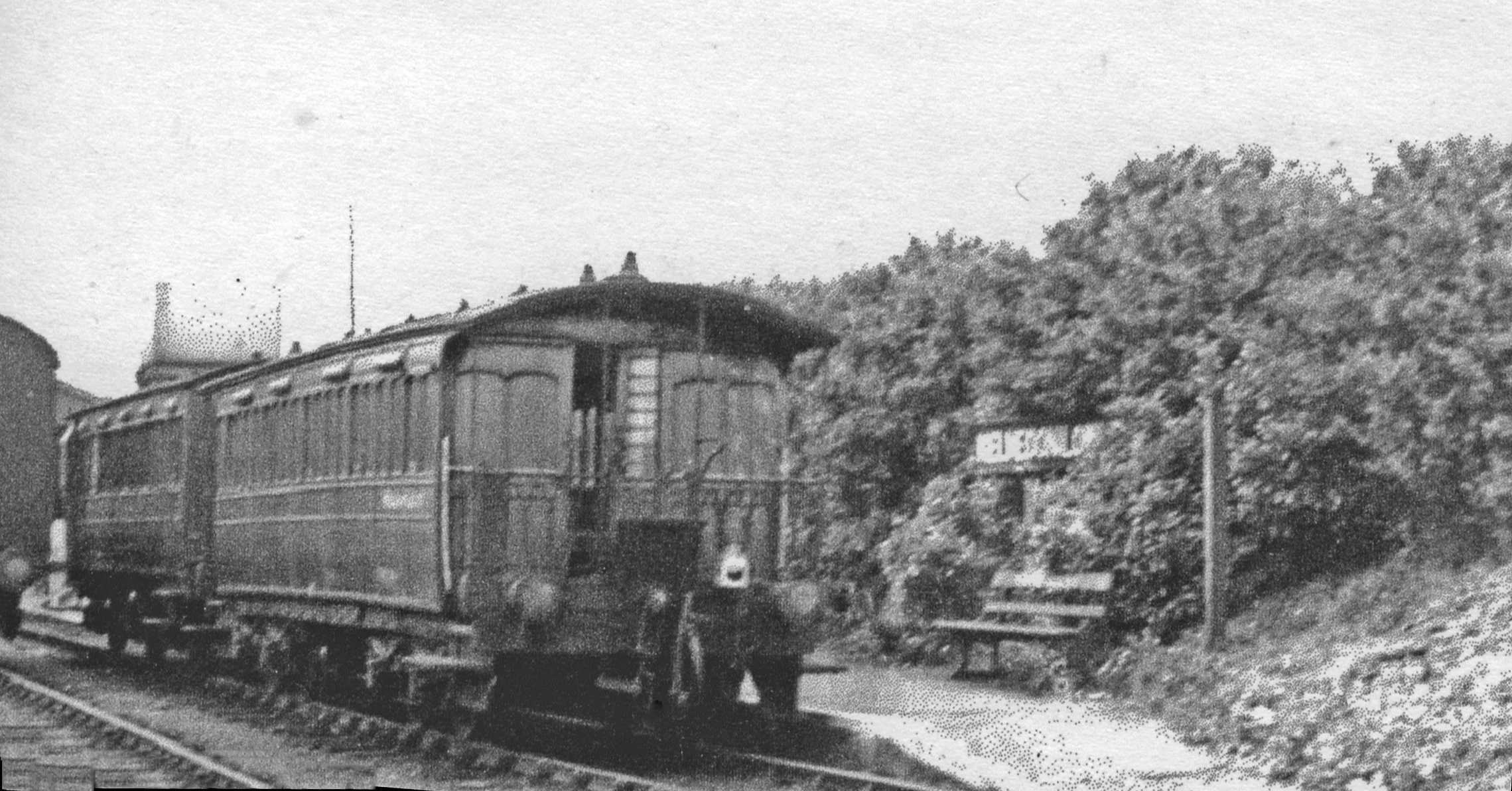
- The station in 1950

General information
- Location: Kelvedon, Braintree; England
- Coordinates: 51.8418°N 0.7045°E
- Grid reference: TL864194
- Platforms: 1

Other information
- Status: Disused

History
- Original company: Kelvedon and Tollesbury Light Railway
- Pre-grouping: Great Eastern Railway
- Post-grouping: London and North Eastern Railway

Key dates
- 1 October 1904: Opened
- 7 May 1951: Closed
Location

Kelvedon Low Level railway station was the western terminus of the Kelvedon and Tollesbury Light Railway in Essex, England. It opened in 1904 and closed in 1951.

There was a single terminal platform on the southeastern side of the Great Eastern Main Line and a steep connecting line to the main line. A footpath linked the low level station to the main Kelvedon railway station.

Preceding station	Disused railways	Following station
Terminus	Great Eastern Railway; Kelvedon and Tollesbury Light Railway	Feering Halt
