= Kelvedon and Tollesbury Light Railway =

Coordinates: 51.7991°N 0.7721°E

The Kelvedon and Tollesbury Light Railway was a locally promoted railway company, intended to open up an agricultural district that suffered from poor transport links. The enactment of the Light Railways Act 1896 encouraged the promoters to persuade the dominant main line railway, the Great Eastern Railway (GER), to participate in the construction and operation of the line.

The line opened from Kelvedon to Tollesbury in 1904. At Kelvedon it had its own station close to the GER main line station. All the stations had minimal buildings—in most cases old coach or bus bodies served as waiting rooms, and the passenger rolling stock consisted of conversions of old vehicles. Passenger business was never dominant, but the area around Tiptree experienced major growth in the culture of soft fruit and of jams.

The GER took over the original company, and built an extension to Tollesbury Pier on the River Blackwater estuary; this opened in 1907. It was hoped that this would lead to numerous commercial possibilities, such as the development of housing and of yachting facilities and increased use of the pier as a transport terminal, but these developments never materialised, and the pier extension railway was closed in 1921. The entire line closed to passenger traffic in 1951, and the goods activity was truncated to serve the Tudwick Road (Tiptree) siding only, for the jam factory. That too was closed in 1962, and there is now no railway activity on the former line.

== Beginnings ==
=== Authorisation ===
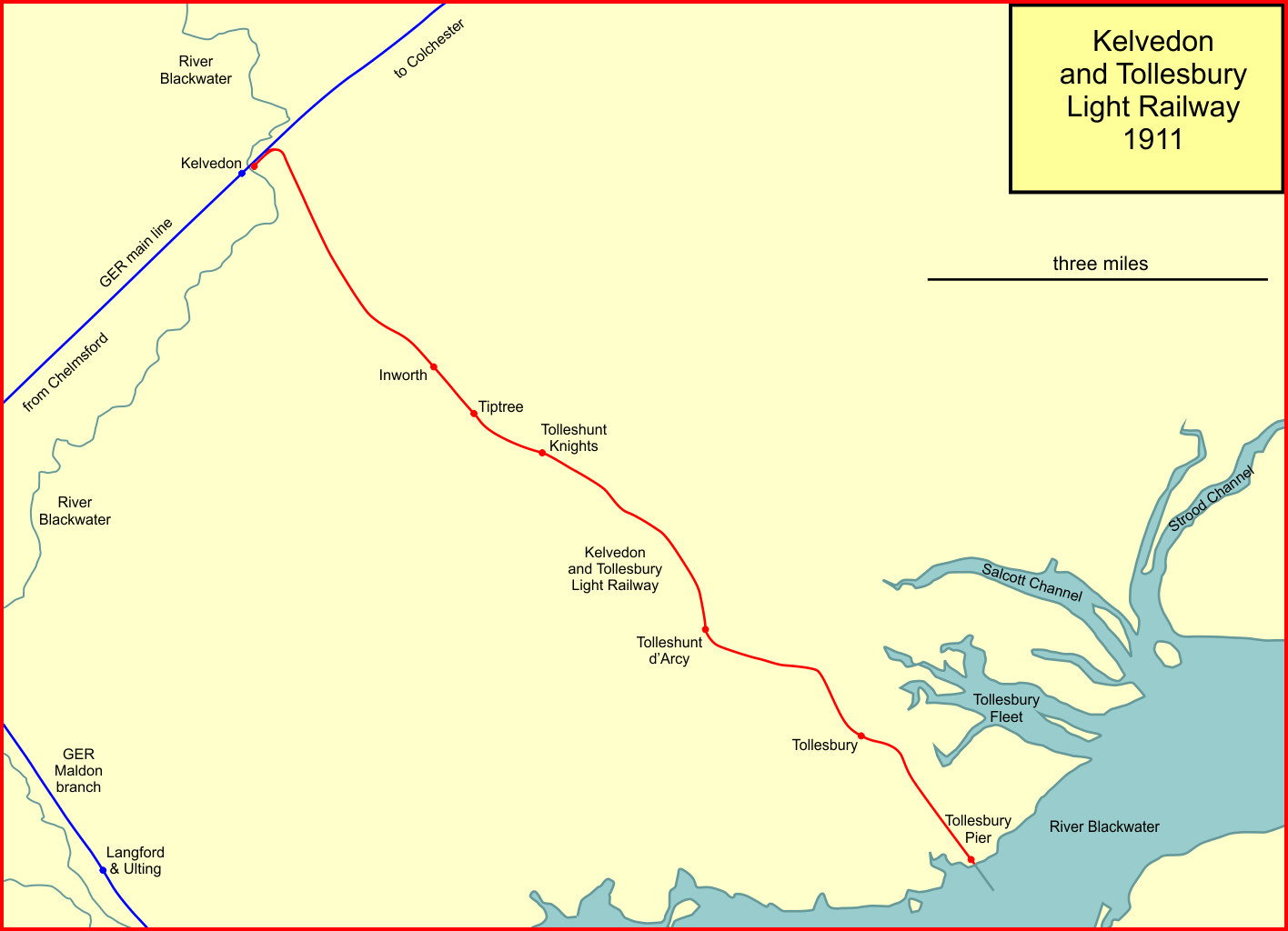
The Kelvedon and Tollesbury Light Railway in 1911

In 1843 the Eastern Counties Railway opened its main line between London (Shoreditch) and Colchester; there was a station at Kelvedon. The existence of a railway immediately improved the prosperity of the area served, by enabling the cheap import of necessary commodities, such as coal and lime (for improving agricultural ground) and the cheap carriage of local produce to market.

The area between the new main line and the estuary of the River Blackwater consisted of exceptionally fertile farmland, but the poor road network locally hampered cartage even over the relatively short distance to Kelvedon. In 1848, a branch line was opened to Maldon, located higher up the Blackwater, which was sponsored by the Eastern Counties Railway and worked by it.

In the succeeding decade, agricultural activity in the Tiptree area had expanded into the production of soft fruit, and into jam making, as well as vegetable farming. At Tollesbury itself, there was a substantial fishing industry, but all of these businesses suffered due to the poor transport facilities.

In 1862, the Great Eastern Railway was formed, taking over the Eastern Counties Railway and others; local agricultural businesses tried to interest the GER in improving local transport links, but for the time being the GER was not interested. Meetings in 1889 and subsequent years proved fruitless.

The Light Railways Act 1896 was intended to facilitate the promotion and construction of locally sponsored branch lines by mitigating some of the expenses usually associated with that work. Moreover, if it was certified that such a line would benefit agriculture, the government might make a grant of money towards its construction.

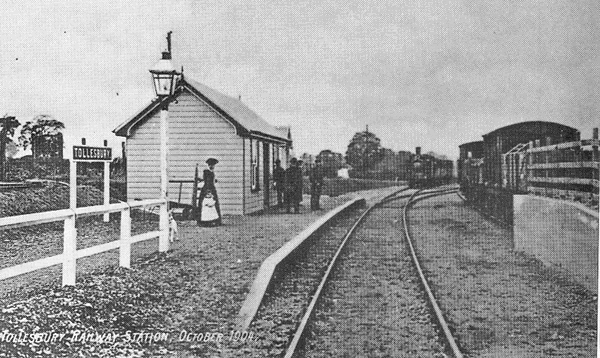
Tollesbury railway station in 1904

A. C. Wilkin was the driving force in the scheme; he was the proprietor of Wilkin & Sons jam factory at Tiptree; the factory had opened in 1885.

After a meeting with the Great Eastern Railway, which now seemed favourable toward the scheme, the promoters applied for a light railway order in 1897; the line would run from Kelvedon GER station to just beyond Tollesbury, on the River Blackwater; it would be a little under ten miles long and cost £45,500 to construct. Fifteen gated level crossings would be needed, and the standard gauge would be used.

At the end of 1897 the Treasury agreed to a grant of £16,000, on condition that the necessary land was given free by local landowners, that the GER supervised the construction of the line, and work it once completed. The light railway order was not yet granted, and in fact the hearing only took place on 25 October 1898. At the hearing some changes inserted by the GER were published; most or all of the level crossings would be ungated; and the station platforms would not be built to main line standards, but would be lower, with steps provided for access to the coaches. The hearing recommended the granting of the light railway order.

The next step was a Board of Trade hearing on 16 March 1899, which was successful. Nevertheless, such was the pace of change that the Kelvedon, Tiptree, and Tollesbury Light Railway Order 1901 was actually issued on 27 February 1901. (Note: It was "granted" on 29 January 1901 and confirmed on 27 February.) The general speed limit on the line would be 25 mph.

=== Construction ===
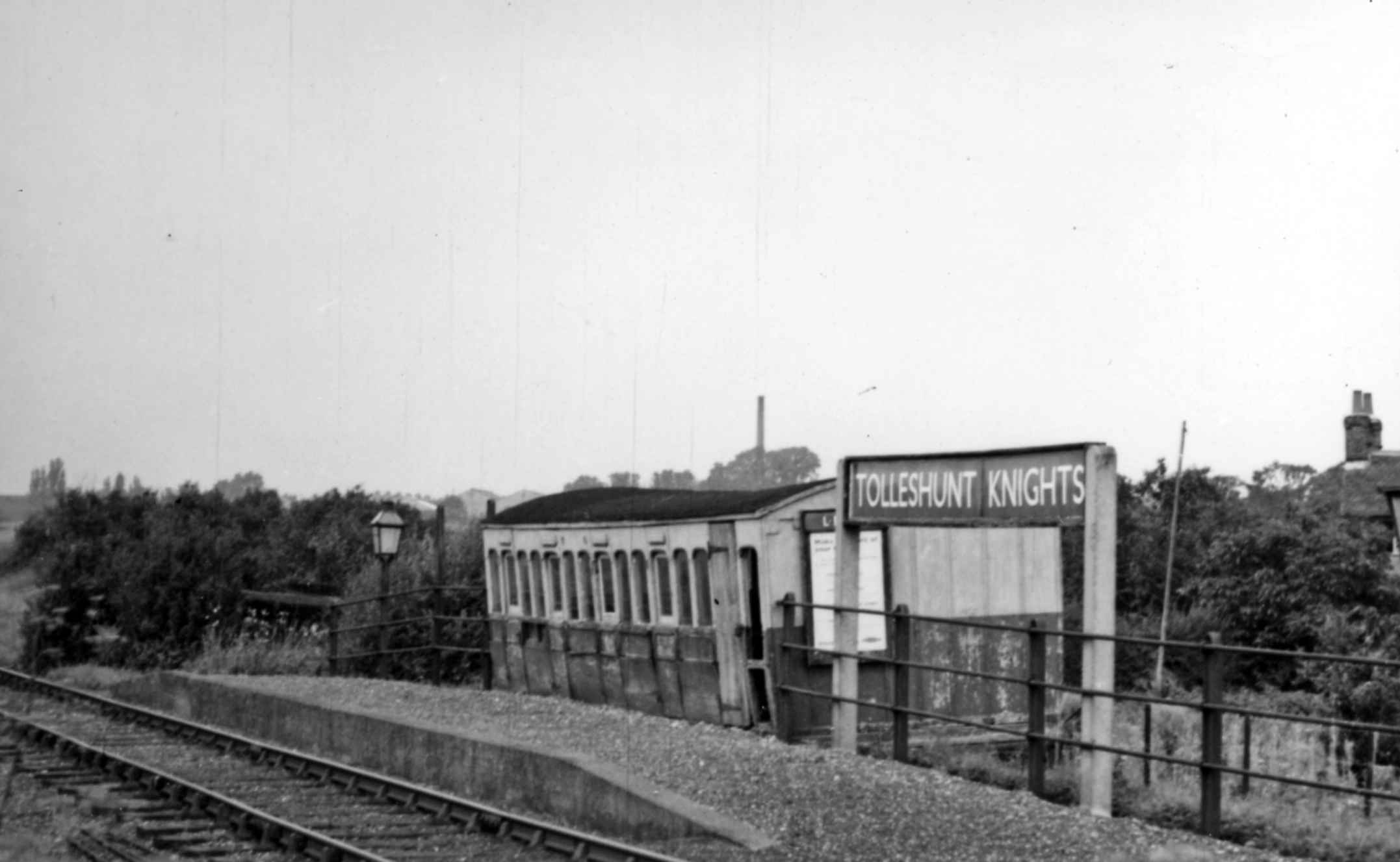
Tolleshunt Knights Halt in 1950

The promoters made a start with land acquisition, and the GER considered what was required of it. A major area of concern for them was the cost of accommodating the light railway trains at Kelvedon; the place was not considered likely to generate traffic income itself, and the cost of the works might well not be repaid in receipts. However, in January 1902 the GER agreed to do the necessary work, which included providing a small independent station platform at Kelvedon. There was a connection to the main line. Gradients on the line were significant, with a ruling gradient of 1 in 50. Several level crossings were gated, but the gates were to be operated by trainmen.

The Board of Trade inspector, Lt Col von Donop, carried out an inspection of the line on 22 September 1904. Although a number of attention-to-detail points were discovered, von Donop gave the necessary approval.

== Opening and operation ==
=== Opening ===
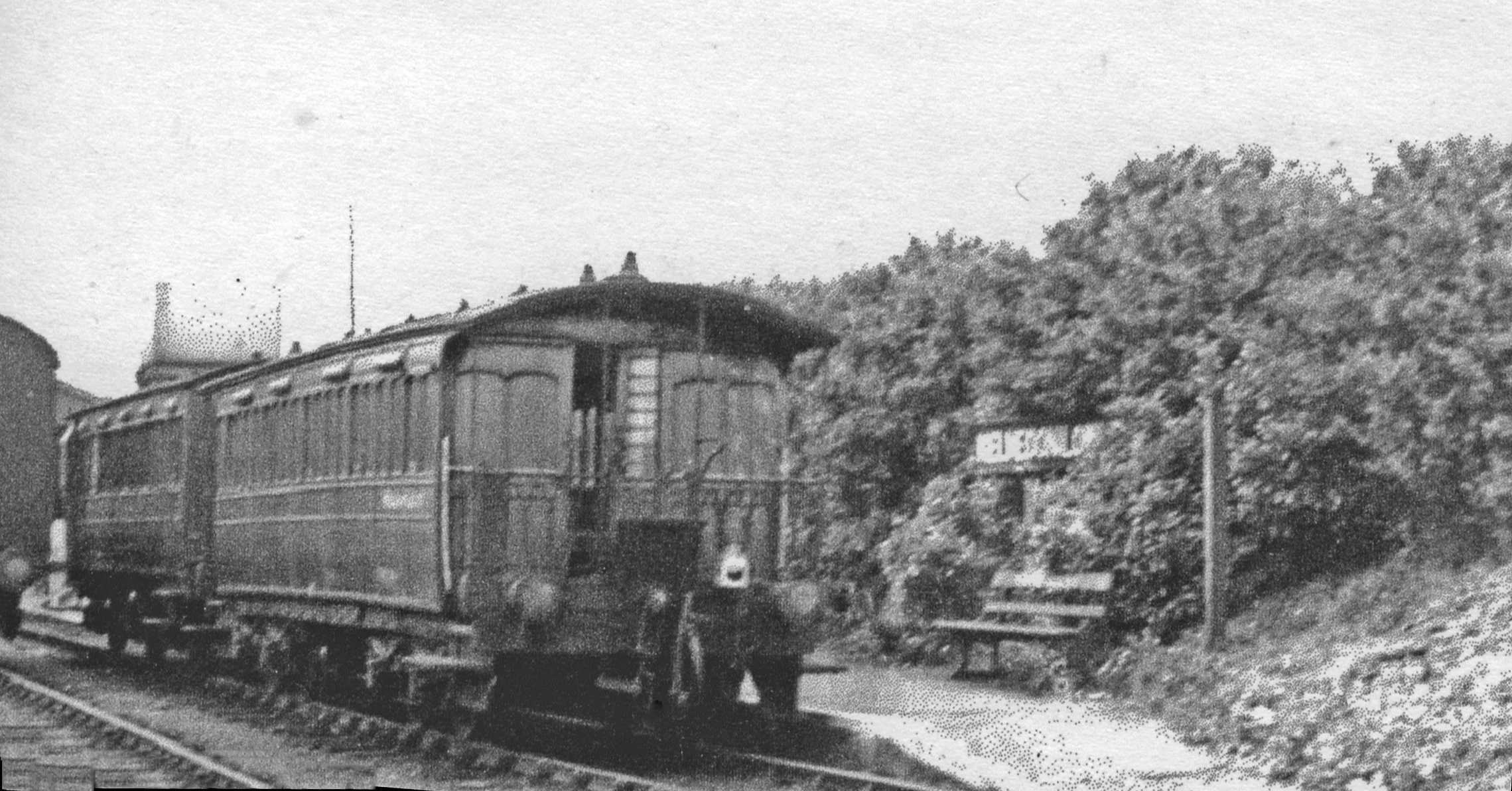
Kelvedon Low Level station in 1950

Public trains started running on 1 October 1904, seven years after the application. The line used a separate passenger platform at Kelvedon, referred to as "Kelvedon Low Level Station". It was 100 feet long, six feet wide and 15 inches above rail level. It was located to the east of the River Blackwater, while the GER station was on the west; there was a pedestrian footbridge for passenger interchange. However the dominant traffic on the line was expected to be goods traffic, agricultural traffic out, and coal and manure in. The line was operated on the "one engine in steam" system.

=== Early train service ===
At first there were four passenger trains in each direction daily, and two goods trains. Capacity at the siding locations was limited and timely clearance was important to avoid delay to incoming wagons, loaded or empty.

=== Rolling stock and stations ===
The first passenger rolling stock was third class only. There were eight coaches in all, converted from ordinary stock, but only four were usually used on the train. These vehicles were six-wheeled third brake coaches, adapted by the removal of the compartment partitions, the substitution of tramway-type low-backed seats, with a central gangway, the fitting of steps for access from rail level, and the provision of end doors and drop-plates, to enable the guard-conductor to pass from car to car. The rolling stock used the Westinghouse brake system.

When the branch was first opened, a small GER 0-4-2 tank locomotive no. 25, dating back to the Adams regime at Stratford, was used, until it was scrapped in 1905.

The accommodation at stations for passengers was eccentric: at Feering (not opened until 1934) it was an old bus body of the type known as “Old Bill”. At Inworth, Tolleshunt Knights and Tolleshunt d’Arcy, the accommodation was the body of old four-wheeled coaches, in the case of Tolleshunt d’Arcy "a particularly fine early GER specimen". At Tollesbury there was a wooden building, and at Tollesbury Pier there was a brick building.

=== Financial performance ===
The GER focussed on earnings on the line, and the narrow calculation of income on the line compared with expenditure was adverse, at about a 30% loss. The accounts referred to "contributive" earnings, that is income on the GER network destined for, or originating on, the Light Railway. This figure alone was typically 50% higher than expenses, so the total picture was satisfactory.

The heavy cartage traffic had soon led to the unpaved roadways at the goods yards becoming rutted and unusable; £915 was quoted as necessary for rectification. In 1906 the Board were told that the net cost of the branch to the GER had risen to £42,142 compared to the £32,875 estimate; this figure was kept lower than otherwise by downgrading the specification for Kelvedon station.

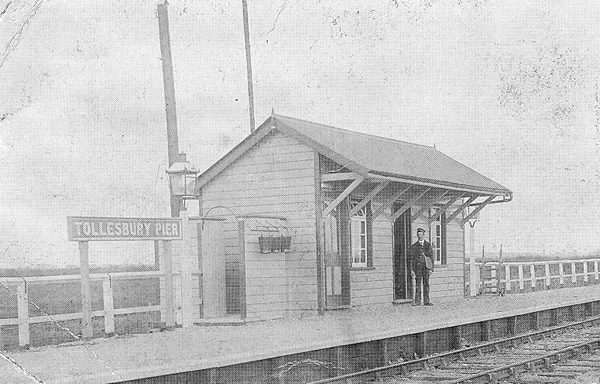
Tollesbury Pier railway station in 1907

An extension to a pier on the River Blackwater at Tollesbury was now pressed forward: it was authorised in the Great Eastern Railway Act of 29 May 1906, and it was relatively soon completed, having cost £4,652. Lt Col von Donop carried out the inspection on 13 May 1907 and the extension opened on 15 May 1907. At low tide the water was a considerable distance out, and the pier was 1,770 feet in length, but it did not have railway track on it. Intending to encourage leisure and residential use of the line, the GER advertised that the area was suitable for the erection of yachting facilities and bungalows.

The basic service provision changed little over the years, although selected trains ran to and from Tollesbury Pier when the extension opened.

== Traffic, and the War and afterwards ==
The production of fruit and vegetables was encouraged by the railway, and jam and preserve production in particular flourished, and railway carryings increased in proportion.

The advent of World War I depressed passenger traffic, but that had never been a major part of the line's business. At the same time, food production was enhanced within the United Kingdom because of enemy activity against shipping, so that the line's principal carrying was increasing.

There was a railway strike in 1919 lasting ten days; another of five days in 1924, and in 1926 the General Strike took place in the UK. These events forced the line's customers to investigate road transport for their produce, and they found that it was feasible to deliver to markets by road, incidentally avoiding the double handling involved in railway transport. At the same time it was evident that the anticipated development of housing and leisure facilities on the Blackwater had not taken place, and the GER decided that operation of the extension to Tollesbury Pier was not worth continuing; it closed on 17 July 1921.

== Organisational change ==
On 1 January 1923 the Great Eastern Railway network was compulsorily transferred to the new London and North Eastern Railway (LNER), as part of a process known as the "grouping", following the Railways Act 1921.

In fact the change in ownership seemed to have little effect on the daily management of the line, although the general decline in the use of rural railways continued.

The original coaching stock on the line was four or six-wheeled vehicles, with third class accommodation only. When the Wisbech and Upwell Tramway closed to passenger traffic in 1928, the Tollesbury line acquired six further coaches from there, and two more when the Stoke Ferry branch closed in September 1930. After refitting at Stratford Works, they reached the Tollesbury line in 1931, and some 54-year-old coaches could be withdrawn. There were two types: the smaller variety, not often used on the Tollesbury branch, was four-wheeled, and the others were bogie vehicles. Both types had flat roofs, small wheels, gas lighting, longitudinal seats, and end platforms with steps and elaborate wrought iron railings. Internally they resembled very old tramcars, with several small windows and no partitions to divide up the longitudinal seats.

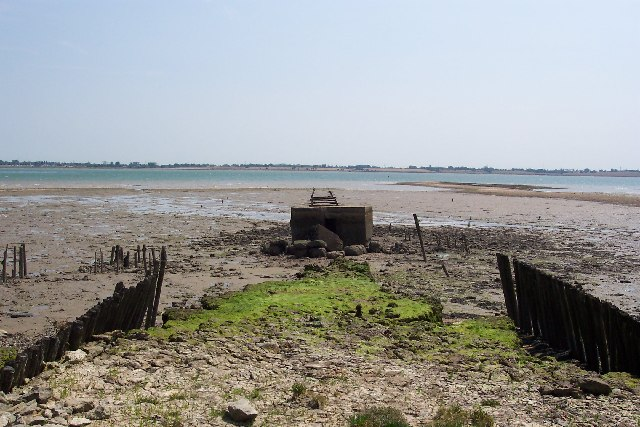
The remains of Tollesbury Pier

During World War II the Tollesbury area became important for the establishment of coastal defences to prevent enemy seaborne landing, and the Tollesbury Pier extension, was rejuvenated (having lain dormant since 1921) for the conveyance of construction materials for the defence works. At the peak of this activity four War Department locomotives were employed at Tollesbury Pier handling anti-aircraft ordnance mounted on railway wagons. Once again the importance of home food production meant that the fruit and vegetable businesses on the line increased their activity.

The end of the war led to the Tollesbury Pier extension once again falling into disuse.

Most of the railways of Great Britain were taken into national ownership at the beginning of 1948, following the Transport Act 1947, and the Tollesbury branch was now part of British Railways. As at the grouping, there was little change observable locally at first. However passenger journeys on the line had reduced to between eight and ten persons daily, and it could hardly be overlooked that the passenger train service was losing money.

Accordingly, the last passenger journeys took place on 5 May 1951; closure was on 7 May 1951. This was followed by the withdrawal of goods facilities beyond Tudwick Road Siding, south of Tiptree, from 29 October 1951. The traffic on the residual branch was coal in and Tiptree jam products out.

This arrangement continued for some years, but was hardly sustainable, and the final revenue-earning run on the branch was from Tiptree on 28 September 1962. There is now no railway activity on the former line.

== Location list ==
- Kelvedon Low Level; opened 1 October 1904; closed 7 May 1951;
- Feering Halt; opened 1 January 1934; closed 7 May 1951;
- Inworth; opened 1 May 1905; closed 7 May 1951;
- Tiptree; opened 1 October 1904; closed 7 May 1951;
- Tolleshunt Knights; 12 December 1910; closed 7 May 1951;
- Tolleshunt d’Arcy; opened 1 October 1904; closed 7 May 1951;
- Tollesbury; opened 1 October 1904; closed 7 May 1951;
- Tollesbury Pier; opened 15 May 1907; closed 18 July 1921.
