= List of United Kingdom locations: Ti =

The United Kingdom

This is part of the list of United Kingdom locations: a gazetteer of place names in the United Kingdom showing each place's locality and geographical coordinates.

== Ti ==
Location	Locality	Coordinates (links to map & photo sources)	OS grid reference
Tibbermore	Perth and Kinross	56.39°N 03.54°W	NO0523
Tibberton	Gloucestershire	51.88°N 02.35°W	SO7621
Tibberton	Shropshire	52.77°N 02.47°W	SJ6820
Tibberton	Worcestershire	52.21°N 02.14°W	SO9057
Tibenham	Norfolk	52.45°N 01.13°E	TM1389
Tibshelf	Derbyshire	53.13°N 01.35°W	SK4360
Tibshelf Wharf	Derbyshire	53.14°N 01.32°W	SK4561
Tibthorpe	East Riding of Yorkshire	53.98°N 00.53°W	SE9655
Ticehurst	East Sussex	51.04°N 00.40°E	TQ6930
Tichborne	Hampshire	51.06°N 01.18°W	SU5730
Tickencote	Rutland	52.67°N 00.55°W	SK9809
Tickenham	North Somerset	51.43°N 02.80°W	ST4471
Tickford End	Milton Keynes	52.07°N 00.71°W	SP8843
Tickhill	Doncaster	53.43°N 01.11°W	SK5993
Tickleback Row	Berkshire	51.44°N 00.76°W	SU8672
Ticklerton	Shropshire	52.50°N 02.76°W	SO4890
Tickmorend	Gloucestershire	51.68°N 02.24°W	ST8398
Ticknall	Derbyshire	52.80°N 01.48°W	SK3523
Tickton	East Riding of Yorkshire	53.85°N 00.38°W	TA0641
Tidbury Green	Warwickshire	52.37°N 01.86°W	SP0975
Tidcombe	Wiltshire	51.32°N 01.58°W	SU2958
Tiddington	Oxfordshire	51.73°N 01.06°W	SP6504
Tiddington	Warwickshire	52.19°N 01.67°W	SP2255
Tidebrook	East Sussex	51.03°N 00.29°E	TQ6129
Tideford	Cornwall	50.40°N 04.33°W	SX3459
Tideford Cross	Cornwall	50.42°N 04.33°W	SX3461
Tidenham	Gloucestershire	51.65°N 02.65°W	ST5595
Tidenham Chase	Gloucestershire	51.67°N 02.65°W	ST5598
Tideswell	Derbyshire	53.27°N 01.77°W	SK1575
Tidmarsh	Berkshire	51.46°N 01.09°W	SU6374
Tidmington	Warwickshire	52.04°N 01.63°W	SP2538
Tidnor	Herefordshire	52.04°N 02.65°W	SO5539
Tidpit	Hampshire	50.97°N 01.90°W	SU0719
Tiers Cross	Pembrokeshire	51.74°N 05.04°W	SM9010
Tiffield	Northamptonshire	52.15°N 00.99°W	SP6951
Tifty	Aberdeenshire	57.45°N 02.38°W	NJ7740
Tigerton	Angus	56.76°N 02.75°W	NO5464
Tigharry	Western Isles	57.60°N 07.51°W	NF7171
Tighnabruaich	Argyll and Bute	55.90°N 05.24°W	NR9773
Tighness	Argyll and Bute	56.18°N 04.75°W	NN2903
Tigley	Devon	50.42°N 03.76°W	SX7560
Tilbrook	Cambridgeshire	52.30°N 00.43°W	TL0769
Tilbury	Essex	51.45°N 00.35°E	TQ6476
Tilbury Green	Essex	52.03°N 00.53°E	TL7440
Tilbury Juxta Clare	Essex	52.03°N 00.56°E	TL7640
Tile Cross	Birmingham	52.47°N 01.76°W	SP1686
Tilegate Green	Essex	51.75°N 00.17°E	TL5008
Tile Hill	Coventry	52.39°N 01.58°W	SP2878
Tilehouse Green	Solihull	52.38°N 01.75°W	SP1776
Tilehurst	Berkshire	51.45°N 01.05°W	SU6673
Tilekiln Green	Essex	51.86°N 00.20°E	TL5221
Tiley	Dorset	50.85°N 02.47°W	ST6706
Tilford	Surrey	51.17°N 00.75°W	SU8743
Tilford Common	Surrey	51.17°N 00.75°W	SU8742
Tilford Reeds	Surrey	51.17°N 00.77°W	SU8643
Tilgate	West Sussex	51.10°N 00.18°W	TQ2735
Tilgate Forest Row	West Sussex	51.07°N 00.20°W	TQ2632
Tilkey	Essex	51.87°N 00.67°E	TL8423
Tilland	Cornwall	50.42°N 04.36°W	SX3261
Tillers' Green	Gloucestershire	51.98°N 02.45°W	SO6932
Tilley	Shropshire	52.83°N 02.74°W	SJ5027
Tilley Green	Shropshire	52.83°N 02.72°W	SJ5127
Tillicoultry	Clackmannan	56.15°N 03.75°W	NS9197
Tillietudlem	South Lanarkshire	55.68°N 03.91°W	NS8045
Tillingham	Essex	51.69°N 00.87°E	TL9903
Tillington	Herefordshire	52.10°N 02.78°W	SO4645
Tillington	Staffordshire	52.81°N 02.13°W	SJ9124
Tillington	West Sussex	50.98°N 00.63°W	SU9621
Tillington Common	Herefordshire	52.10°N 02.80°W	SO4546
Tillislow	Devon	50.71°N 04.29°W	SX3893
Tillworth	Devon	50.79°N 02.95°W	ST3300
Tilly Down	Hampshire	51.23°N 01.57°W	SU3049
Tillydrone	City of Aberdeen	57.16°N 02.11°W	NJ9308
Tillyfourie	Aberdeenshire	57.19°N 02.59°W	NJ6412
Tillyloss	Angus	56.67°N 03.01°W	NO3854
Tilmanstone	Kent	51.21°N 01.29°E	TR3051
Tilney All Saints	Norfolk	52.72°N 00.30°E	TF5617
Tilney cum Islington	Norfolk	52.69°N 00.32°E	TF5713
Tilney Fen End	Norfolk	52.67°N 00.27°E	TF5411
Tilney High End	Norfolk	52.72°N 00.30°E	TF5617
Tilney St Lawrence	Norfolk	52.69°N 00.27°E	TF5413
Tilsdown	Gloucestershire	51.68°N 02.37°W	ST7499
Tilshead	Wiltshire	51.22°N 01.95°W	SU0347
Tilsmore	East Sussex	50.96°N 00.23°E	TQ5721
Tilsop	Shropshire	52.34°N 02.57°W	SO6172
Tilstock	Shropshire	52.92°N 02.68°W	SJ5437
Tilston	Cheshire	53.05°N 02.82°W	SJ4551
Tilstone Bank	Cheshire	53.12°N 02.65°W	SJ5659
Tilstone Fearnall	Cheshire	53.13°N 02.65°W	SJ5660
Tilsworth	Bedfordshire	51.90°N 00.57°W	SP9824
Tilton on the Hill	Leicestershire	52.63°N 00.90°W	SK7405
Tilts	Doncaster	53.57°N 01.14°W	SE5709
Tiltups End	Gloucestershire	51.67°N 02.23°W	ST8497
Tilty	Essex	51.91°N 00.31°E	TL5926
Timberden Bottom	Kent	51.33°N 00.16°E	TQ5162
Timberhonger	Worcestershire	52.32°N 02.11°W	SO9270
Timberland	Lincolnshire	53.10°N 00.32°W	TF1258
Timbersbrook	Cheshire	53.15°N 02.16°W	SJ8962
Timberscombe	Somerset	51.16°N 03.50°W	SS9542
Timble	North Yorkshire	53.96°N 01.74°W	SE1752
Timbold Hill	Kent	51.27°N 00.72°E	TQ9056
Timbrelham	Cornwall	50.59°N 04.31°W	SX3680
Timperley	Trafford	53.39°N 02.33°W	SJ7889
Timsbury	Bath and North East Somerset	51.32°N 02.48°W	ST6658
Timsbury	Hampshire	51.01°N 01.51°W	SU3424
Timsgarry	Western Isles	58.19°N 07.02°W	NB0534
Timworth	Suffolk	52.28°N 00.72°E	TL8669
Timworth Green	Suffolk	52.28°N 00.71°E	TL8569
Tincleton	Dorset	50.71°N 02.32°W	SY7791
Tindale	Cumbria	54.92°N 02.61°W	NY6159
Tindale Crescent	Durham	54.63°N 01.70°W	NZ1927
Tindon End	Essex	51.98°N 00.34°E	TL6134
Tingewick	Buckinghamshire	51.98°N 01.05°W	SP6532
Tingley	Leeds	53.73°N 01.57°W	SE2826
Tingrith	Bedfordshire	51.97°N 00.54°W	TL0032
Tinhay	Devon	50.64°N 04.27°W	SX3985
Tinkers End	Buckinghamshire	51.93°N 00.89°W	SP7627
Tinshill	Leeds	53.84°N 01.62°W	SE2539
Tinsley	Sheffield	53.40°N 01.41°W	SK3990
Tinsley Green	West Sussex	51.13°N 00.17°W	TQ2839
Tintagel	Cornwall	50.65°N 04.76°W	SX0588
Tintagel Head	Cornwall	50.66°N 04.75°W	SX051890
Tintern	Monmouthshire	51.69°N 02.69°W	SO5200
Tintinhull	Somerset	50.96°N 02.72°W	ST4919
Tintwistle	Derbyshire	53.47°N 01.97°W	SK0297
Tinwald	Dumfries and Galloway	55.11°N 03.56°W	NY0081
Tinwell	Rutland	52.64°N 00.52°W	TF0006
Tipner	City of Portsmouth	50.82°N 01.10°W	SU6303
Tippacott	Devon	51.20°N 03.77°W	SS7647
Tipper's Hill	Warwickshire	52.48°N 01.58°W	SP2888
Tipperty	Aberdeenshire	57.32°N 02.06°W	NJ9626
Tipple Cross	Devon	50.65°N 04.33°W	SX3587
Tipps End	Norfolk	52.53°N 00.21°E	TL5095
Tip's Cross	Essex	51.67°N 00.28°E	TL5800
Tipta Skerry	Shetland Islands	60.85°N 00.88°W	HP606194
Tiptoe	Hampshire	50.77°N 01.64°W	SZ2597
Tipton	Sandwell	52.52°N 02.07°W	SO9592
Tipton Green	Sandwell	52.52°N 02.07°W	SO9592
Tipton St John	Devon	50.71°N 03.29°W	SY0991
Tiptree	Essex	51.81°N 00.74°E	TL8916
Tiptree Heath	Essex	51.80°N 00.72°E	TL8815
Tirabad	Powys	52.05°N 03.64°W	SN8741
Tircanol	Swansea	51.66°N 03.92°W	SS6798
Tirdeunaw	Swansea	51.65°N 03.95°W	SS6597
Tiree	Argyll and Bute	56.49°N 06.92°W	NL971440
Tirinie	Perth and Kinross	56.78°N 03.83°W	NN8867
Tirley	Gloucestershire	51.95°N 02.24°W	SO8328
Tirley Knowle	Gloucestershire	51.95°N 02.26°W	SO8229
Tir-Phil	Caerphilly	51.71°N 03.26°W	SO1303
Tirril	Cumbria	54.62°N 02.77°W	NY5026
Tirryside	Highland	58.06°N 04.44°W	NC5611
Tirvister	Shetland Islands	60.48°N 01.36°W	HU3578
Tir-y-berth	Caerphilly	51.65°N 03.23°W	ST1596
Tir-y-dail	Carmarthenshire	51.79°N 04.00°W	SN6213
Tisbury	Wiltshire	51.06°N 02.08°W	ST9429
Tisman's Common	West Sussex	51.07°N 00.47°W	TQ0732
Tissington	Derbyshire	53.07°N 01.74°W	SK1752
Titchberry	Devon	51.01°N 04.51°W	SS2427
Titchfield	Hampshire	50.84°N 01.24°W	SU5305
Titchfield Common	Hampshire	50.85°N 01.26°W	SU5206
Titchfield Park	Hampshire	50.86°N 01.24°W	SU5307
Titchmarsh	Northamptonshire	52.39°N 00.50°W	TL0279
Titchwell	Norfolk	52.95°N 00.60°E	TF7543
Titcomb	Berkshire	51.38°N 01.46°W	SU3765
Tithby	Nottinghamshire	52.91°N 00.97°W	SK6936
Tithebarn	Staffordshire	52.96°N 01.89°W	SK0741
Tithe Barn Hillock	St Helens	53.48°N 02.67°W	SJ5599
Titley	Herefordshire	52.23°N 02.98°W	SO3360
Titlington	Northumberland	55.42°N 01.85°W	NU0915
Titmore Green	Hertfordshire	51.91°N 00.24°W	TL2126
Titsey	Surrey	51.26°N 00.01°E	TQ4054
Titson	Cornwall	50.78°N 04.49°W	SS2401
Tittenhurst	Berkshire	51.40°N 00.63°W	SU9568
Tittensor	Staffordshire	52.93°N 02.19°W	SJ8738
Titterhill	Shropshire	52.41°N 02.73°W	SO5080
Tittle Row	Berkshire	51.51°N 00.76°W	SU8680
Tittleshall	Norfolk	52.75°N 00.79°E	TF8921
Titton	Worcestershire	52.31°N 02.26°W	SO8269
Titty Hill	West Sussex	51.01°N 00.78°W	SU8525
Tiumpan Head	Western Isles	58.26°N 06.16°W	NB558378
Tiverton	Cheshire	53.13°N 02.67°W	SJ5560
Tiverton	Devon	50.89°N 03.49°W	SS9512
Tivetshall St Margaret	Norfolk	52.42°N 01.17°E	TM1686
Tivetshall St Mary	Norfolk	52.42°N 01.17°E	TM1686
Tividale	Sandwell	52.50°N 02.06°W	SO9690
Tivington	Somerset	51.19°N 03.53°W	SS9345
Tivington Knowle	Somerset	51.18°N 03.53°W	SS9344
Tivoli	Cumbria	54.56°N 03.56°W	NX9920
Tivy Dale	Barnsley	53.55°N 01.59°W	SE2707
Tixall	Staffordshire	52.79°N 02.04°W	SJ9722
Tixover	Rutland	52.58°N 00.56°W	SK9700
