= Indian bagpipe =

Indian bagpipe may refer to:

- Mashak, a bagpipe found in Northern India and Pakistan
  - The Great Highland Bagpipe, played in some parts of India for ceremonies due to retention of some British military traditions
- Titti (bagpipe), a bagpipe played in Andhra Pradesh
- Sruti upanga, a bagpipe of Tamil Nadu
