= Titty (disambiguation) =

Titty or Tittie may refer to:

- Titti (bagpipe), an Indian bagpipe
- Tittie Butte, a mountain in Oregon, United States
- Titty Fruit, a medicinal plant
- Titty Hill, West Sussex, England
- Titty Ho, a suburb in Raunds, Northamptonshire, England
- Titty Walker, a fictional character in Arthur Ransome's Swallows and Amazons series of children's books
- A slang term for a breast or teat, derived from "tit"
- Kitten
- Sister or girl, in Scottish English slang

== See also ==
- Tit (disambiguation)
- Titti (disambiguation)
