= Tit =

TIT, Tit, Tits, or tit may refer to:

== Birds ==
- Tit (bird) or Paridae, a large family of passerine birds
  - Penduline tit or Remizidae, sometimes included in Paridae as Remizinae
- Bearded tit, a small reed-bed passerine bird
- Long-tailed tits or Aegithalidae, a family of passerine birds with long tails
- Tit-babbler or Macronus, a genus in the family Timaliidae
- Tit berrypecker, a species of bird in the family Paramythiidae
- Tit hylia, a species of bird in the family Cettiidae
- Tomtit, a small passerine bird of the family Petroicidae
  - Tomtit (disambiguation)#Birds, various other birds called tomtits
- Wrentit, a small bird, the only species in the genus Chamaea
- Shriketit or Falcunculus, the only genus in the family Falcunculidae

== Places ==
- Tin Tsz stop, a Light Rail stop in Hong Kong
- Tit, Adrar, a town in Adrar Province, central Algeria
- Tit, Tamanrasset, a village in Tamanrasset Province, southern Algeria
- Tit-e Olya, a village in West Azerbaijan Province, Iran
- Tehran International Tower, a residential tower in Tehran, Iran

== People ==
- Jacques Tits (1930–2021), French/Belgian mathematician
- Tit (name), Romanian male given name
- Tit Linda Sou (born 1989), female track and field sprint athlete who competes internationally for Cambodia
- Tit Štante (born 1998), Slovenian snowboarder

== Mathematics ==
- Tarski's indefinability theorem, a theorem which states that arithmetical truth cannot be defined in arithmetic
- Tits alternative, an important theorem about the structure of finitely generated linear groups
- Tits group, a finite simple group ^{2}F_{4}(2)′

== Organizations ==
- Technological Institute of Textile & Sciences, in Bhiwani, Haryana, India
- Tokyo Institute of Technology, a national top-tier research university in Greater Tokyo Area, Japan
- Turkish Revenge Brigade or TİT, an ultra-nationalist militant organisation in Turkey
- Texas Institute of Technology and Science, proposed University

== Other uses ==
- Epistle of Paul to Titus, part of the New Testament (abbreviated "Tit.")
- "Tits", a song by Sparks from Indiscreet, 1975
- "Tits", a song by The Stranglers from Black and White, 1978
- Slang for a breast or teat, an organ in female mammals that produces milk to feed young offspring
- Idiot, in British slang
- Police officer, in British slang
- Trotters Independent Traders, a fictional company from the BBC sitcom Only Fools and Horses
- The Incredible True Story, the second studio album by American rapper Logic
- Titcoin, a cryptocurrency

== See also ==
- Titt (disambiguation)
- Titty (disambiguation)
