= Blue tit (disambiguation) =

The Eurasian blue tit (Cyanistes caeruleus) is a species of bird.

Blue tit may also refer to:

- African blue tit (Cyanistes teneriffae), a species of bird
- Blue tit (Chliaria kina or Hypolycaena kina), a species of butterfly
- A cultivar of the plum Prunus domestica
