= Titti =

Titti may refer to:

- Titti (bagpipe), a bagpipe found in Andhra Pradesh, India
- Titty (disambiguation), various meanings, most popularly a synonym for female breasts

Titti is also a given name. People with the name include:

- Titti Maartmann, a Norwegian luge athlete
- Titti Qvarnström, a Swedish chef

== See also ==
- Titi (disambiguation)
