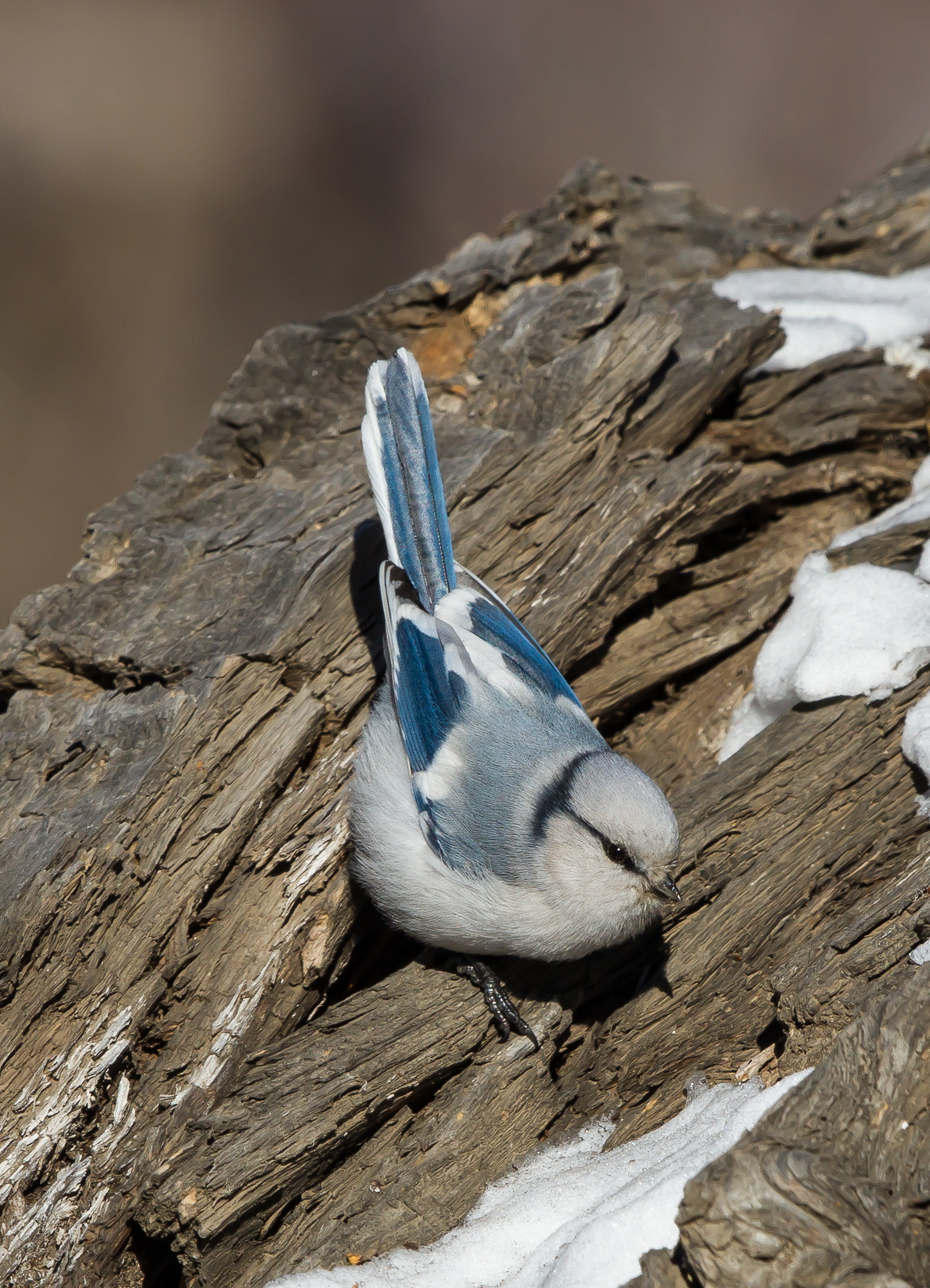

Conservation status
- Least Concern (IUCN 3.1)

Scientific classification
- Kingdom: Animalia
- Phylum: Chordata
- Class: Aves
- Order: Passeriformes
- Family: Paridae
- Genus: Cyanistes
- Species: C. cyanus

Binomial name
- Cyanistes cyanus (Pallas, 1770)
- Azure tit distribution map Resident

Synonyms
- Parus cyanus Pallas; Parus saebyensis (Sparrman)

= Azure tit =

Species of bird

The azure tit (Cyanistes cyanus) is a species of Eurasian birds in the order of passeriformes in the family Paridae. This small species is the only member of the family Paridae to have a white cap, and was described in 1770 by Peter Simon Pallas. Its closest cousins are the blue tit and the African blue tit (Cyanistes teneriffae)

It is a widespread and common resident breeder throughout Russia, Central Asia, northwest China, Manchuria, and Pakistan.There are some records of the species in other parts of Europe, including in Finland, Sweden, Poland and Austria.

== Habitat ==
It is found in temperate and subarctic deciduous or mixed woodlands, scrub, and marshes. It is a resident species, and most birds do not migrate. It nests in tree holes, laying approximately 10 eggs. The bird is a close sitter, displaying defensive behaviors such as hissing and biting when disturbed. Its diet primarily consists of insects, seeds, small invertebrates, bug larvae, and eggs.

== Description ==
This 12–13 cm (4.7–5.1 in) bird is unmistakable. Its head, tail corners, wing bars, and underparts are white, while the upperparts are blue. It has a distinctive dark line running through its eye.

== Calls ==
The calls are similar to blue tit, calling dee, dee, dee or a scolding churr. The song is a tsi-tsi-tshurr-tsi-tsi-tshurr, which has been described as intermediate between blue tit and crested tit.

== Behavior and Reproduction ==
Like all tits, the Azure Tit is a very active bird · · · Hybridization with other tits—particularly Blue Tits—can occur; this may involve individuals that have escaped captivity or birds that have strayed from their usual range Hybridization involving Azure Tits has been documented in France and Germany; these hybrids are known as "*Parus pleskei*" The Azure Tit may mingle with other bird species; it is not uncommon to see them alongside Goldcrests and Firecrests—which share a similar distribution across the Palearctic ecozone—or with members of the *Phylloscopus* genus, such as the Wood Warbler, Hume's Leaf Warbler, or the Greenish Warbler, all of which are of a similar size · · · Azure Tit nests may be spaced anywhere from a few tens to a few hundred meters apart; while these birds do not live in highly social colonies like Golden Weavers, they rarely stray too far from their own kind · · · Their nests are constructed from moss, leaves, and various stems and fibers—whether of plant origin or otherwise · · · The breeding season begins between late March and early April, with egg-laying commencing in early April · · · The female lays a clutch of about ten white eggs speckled with reddish dots and incubates them for 13 to 14 days; once hatched, she feeds the chicks for 20 days, and the young fledge in early June · · ·

== Taxonomy ==
For many years the azure tit was known as Parus cyanus. In 2005, analysis of the mtDNA cytochrome b sequences of the Paridae indicated that Cyanistes was an early offshoot from the lineage of other tits, and more accurately regarded as a genus rather than a subgenus of Parus.

The azure tit not infrequently hybridizes with the blue tit in western Russia; the resulting birds are called Pleske's tit (Cyanistes × pleskei) and were once considered a distinct species.

The population in central Asia, yellow-breasted tit (C. c. flavipectus or Parus flavipectus), is sometimes included as a subspecies of the azure tit.

== Gallery ==
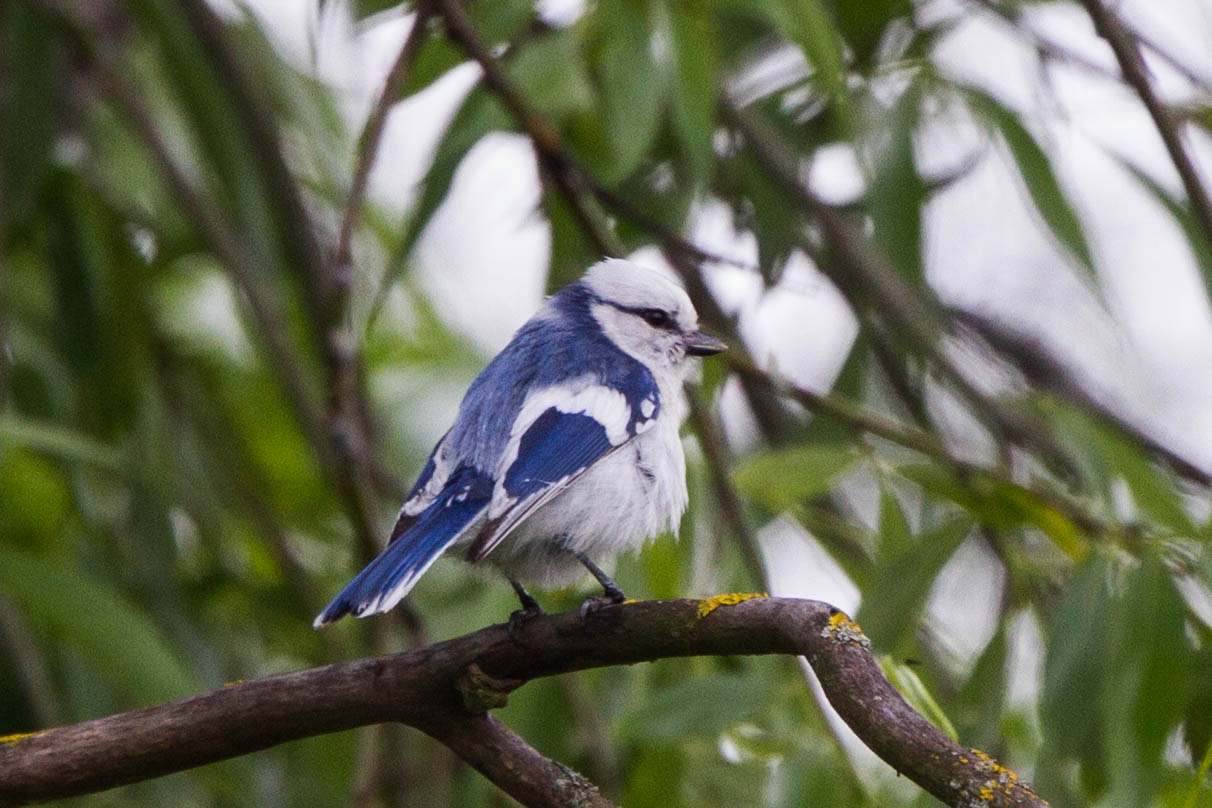
Azure tit (Cyanistes cyanus)

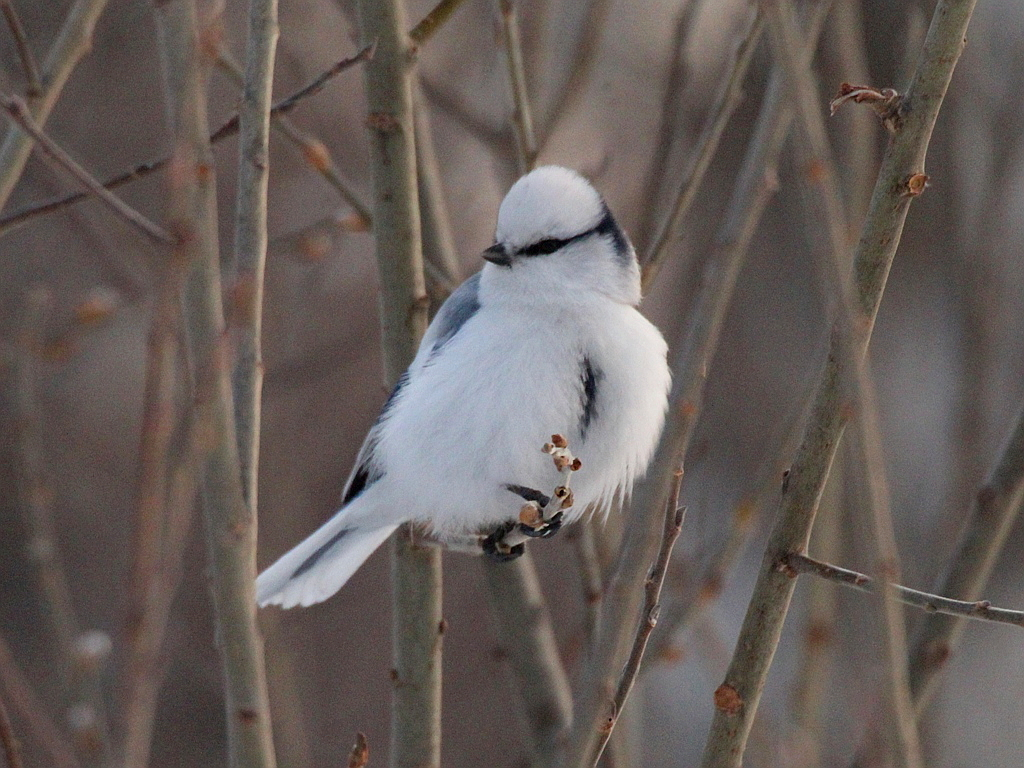
Azure tit (Cyanistes cyanus)

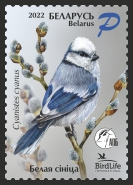
Azure Tit (Cyanistes cyanus) on a postage stamp of the Republic of Belarus

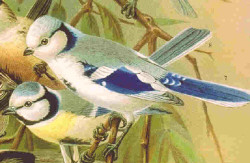
Illustration of azure tit with "Pleske's tit" below

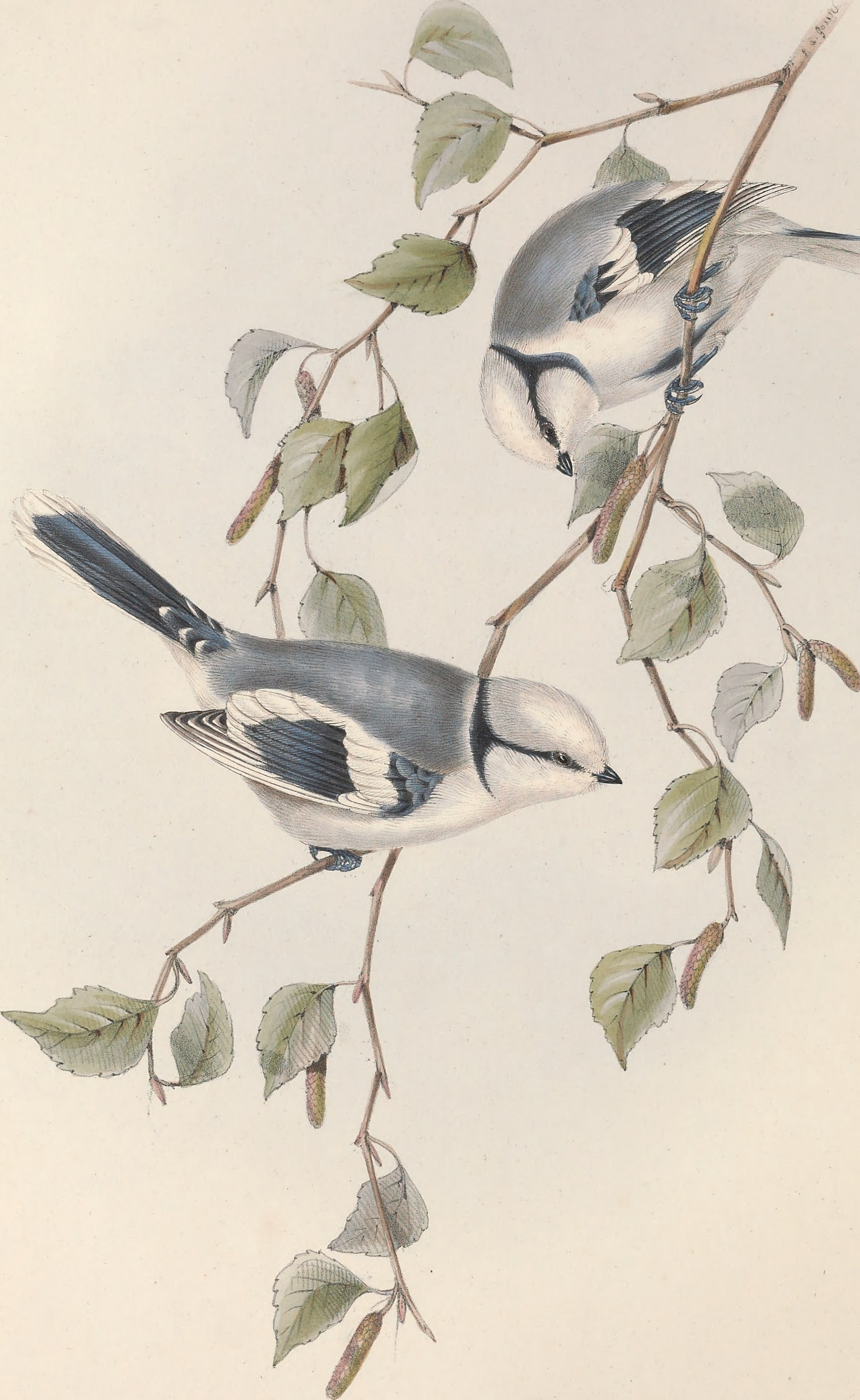
Illustration of azure tit (Cyanistes cyanus)
