= Tomtit (disambiguation) =

A tomtit (Petroica macrocephala) is a species of passerine bird in the family Petroicidae found in New Zealand.

There are several subspecies, including:

- Chatham tomtit

Tomtit may also refer to:

== Birds ==
- Various species of titmouse of the family Paridae, the tits
  - In Britain, especially
    - Cyanistes caeruleus, the blue tit
    - Parus major, the great tit
  - In the US, Poecile atricapilla, the black-capped chickadee
- Other small birds unrelated to the titmice
  - Various wrens of the family Troglodytidae
  - In the US, some nuthatches of the family Sittidae
  - In Australia, some thornbills of the family Acanthizidae

== Other ==
- The Hawker Tomtit, a Royal Air Force training biplane of the 1920s.
- The Blackburne Tomtit, an engine for light aircraft, c. 1922
- TOMTIT (Transmission Of Matter Through Interstitial Time), a fictional device featured in the Doctor Who serial The Time Monster
- Tom Tit, a pen name of Arthur Good (1853-1928), a French science popularizer

== See also ==
- Tit (disambiguation)#Birds
- Tom Tits Experiment, a Swedish science center
