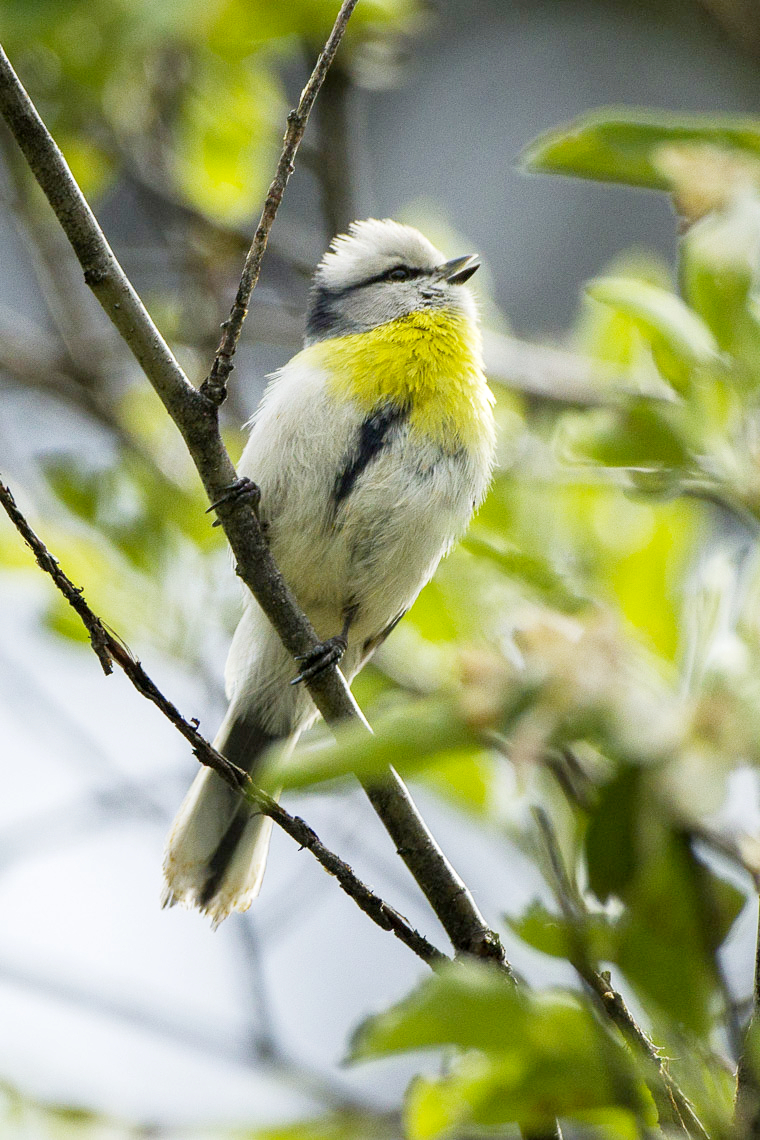

Scientific classification
- Kingdom: Animalia
- Phylum: Chordata
- Class: Aves
- Order: Passeriformes
- Family: Paridae
- Genus: Cyanistes
- Species: C. cyanus
- Subspecies: C. c. flavipectus

Trinomial name
- Cyanistes cyanus flavipectus Severtsov, 1873

Synonyms
- Parus flavipectus

= Yellow-breasted tit =

Subspecies of bird

The yellow-breasted tit (Cyanistes cyanus flavipectus) is a bird in the family Paridae. It is found in Afghanistan, China, Kazakhstan, Kyrgyzstan, India, Pakistan, Russia, Tajikistan, Turkmenistan, and Uzbekistan. Its natural habitat is temperate forests.

It is usually classified as a subspecies of the azure tit.

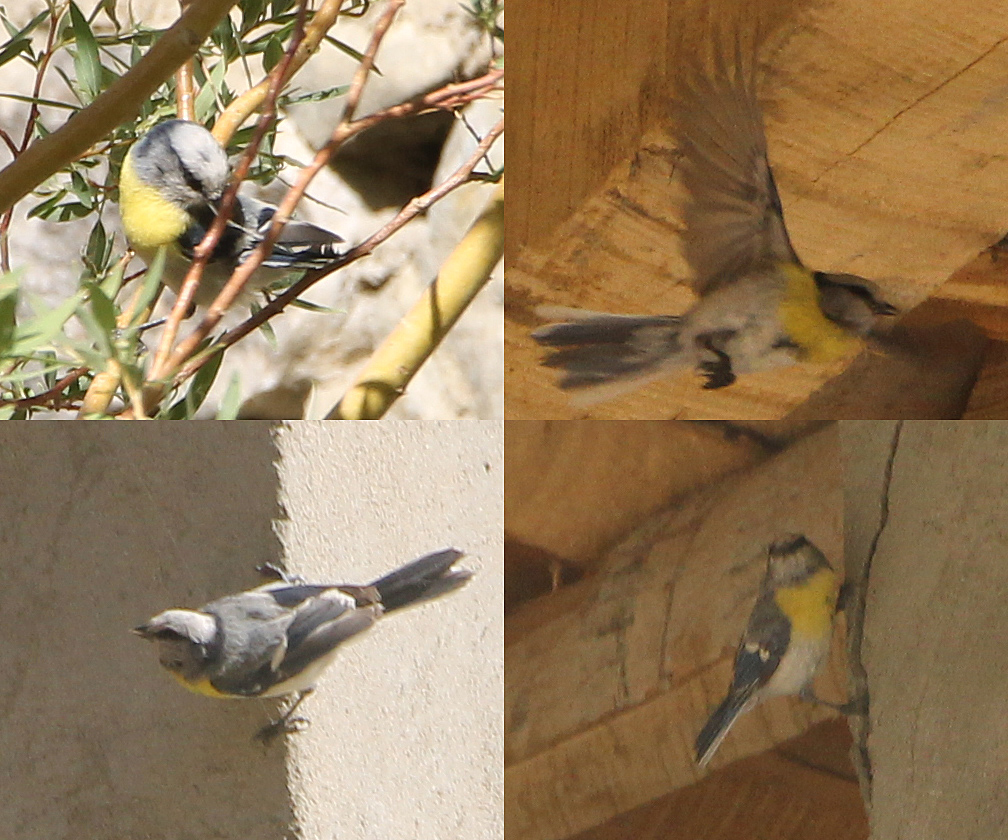
