= Titi (disambiguation) =

Titi is a New World monkey in the genus Callicebus.

Titi may also refer to:

== Animals ==
- Aymara name for the Andean mountain cat
- Central American squirrel monkey, referred to as the "titi monkey" in Costa Rica
- Geoffroy's tamarin, referred to as "titi monkey" in Panama
- Sooty shearwater (Ardenna grisea) or tītī, a bird
- Blue Jay (Tities) in the Mi'kmaq language.

== Plants ==
- Cliftonia monophylla, tree
- Cyrilla racemiflora, sole species in the flowering plant genus Cyrilla

== Places ==
- Titi, Burundi, a village
- Tītī / Muttonbird Islands, New Zealand

== People ==
- Titi or Tyti, ancient Egyptian queen
- Titi (footballer, born 1988), Brazilian football center-back
- Titi (footballer, born 2002), Brazilian football defender
- Thierry Henry (born 1977), French footballer
- Titi Camara (born 1972), Guinean footballer
- Yityish "Titi" Aynaw, Israeli model
- Titi (singer), Senegalese singer Ndeye Fatou

== Fictional characters ==
- Titi, an orphaned young girl in the Japanese web manga Centuria
