= Titt =

Titt is a surname. Notable people with the surname include:

- George Frank Titt, Lord Mayor of Manchester 1930-31
- John Wallis Titt (1841-1910), engineer and windmill manufacturer
- William Titt (1881-1956), Olympic swimmer

== See also ==
- Tit (disambiguation)
