= Sruti upanga =

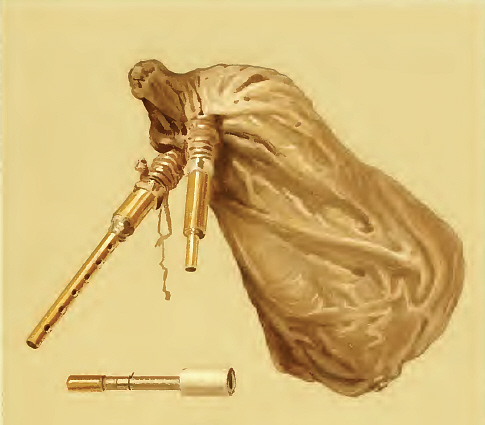
From C. R. Day, Plate XVI

The sruti upanga ("drone bagpipe", or bhazana-śruti, druthi, or nosbug) is a type of bagpipe played in Tamil Nadu, southern India. The instrument was often used to supply a drone to accompany mukha vina (Tamil oboe) music.

The instrument was described by Charles Russel Day (1860-1900):

The bagpipe here drawn is the Moshuq, or, as it is called in Southern India, Śruti-upanga or Bhazana-śruti. It is used merely as a drone; the holes in the pipe are wholly or partially stopped with wax so as to tune the instrument to the pitch desired. The bag is made of the skin of a kid and is inflated from the mouth by means of the smaller of the two pipes shown. The drone is of cane, mounted in a stock of the same material, and which contains the reed. An enlarged drawing of the reed has been given in the plate, in order better to show its construction, and, as can be seen, the vibrations are controlled by a little piece of wire or fine twine tied roughly round the tongue. The whole reed is in one piece and is generally made of small cane or of the large marsh reeds found almost everywhere. Black wax is used to make the instrument wind-tight. The Moshuq of Northern India does not differ much in outward appearance from this, but contains a chanter, with the addition sometimes of a drone.

== Playing method ==
Beatrice Edgerly notes in 1942, similar to Day, that the pitch of the instrument was controlled by inserting wire or bits of silk.

== See also ==
- Mashak, a Northern Indian bagpipe
- Titti (bagpipe), a bagpipe in Andhra Pradesh and Kerala
