= Mashak =

Indian musical instrument

The mashak (also known as mushak baja, masak, mishek, meshek, moshug, moshaq, moshuq, mashak bin, bin baji) is a type of bagpipe found in Northern India, Rajasthan Uttarakhand, Sudurpaschim Province (especially Baitadi and Darchula district) of Nepal and parts of Pakistan and Afghanistan. The pipe was associated with weddings and festive occasions. In India it is historically found in Rajasthan and Uttar Pradesh and Uttarakhand. This bagpipe uses single reeds, and can be played either as a drone or as a melody instrument.

== Etymology ==
The etymology of the term mashak stems from its common use in India, referring to a skin bag used for carrying water. This skin bag shares a similar function to the air bag of the bag pipes.

== Relation with the Scottish Highland pipes ==
Some academics dispute any indigenous origins of the mashak; researcher Ander Burton Alter wrote in 2000 that the pipes today played in Kumaon are Scottish Highland bagpipes with one bass and two tenor drones, with no local manufacturer or evidence of existence prior to British rule in 1814. Organologist Anthony Baines, however, described an intermediary development stage wherein Indian musicians imitated the Highland pipe by tying "an extra pipe or two" into their mashak. Similarly, the New Grove Dictionary of Musical Instruments (1984) describes the traditional mashak as becoming rare as it is displaced by the Scottish pipes.

== Bagpipes in Uttarakhand ==
The bagpipe is an essential part of music and culture of Garhwal and Kumaon.

=== Cultural significance ===
In the central Himalayan region of Uttarakhand in Northern India the masak baja or masakbeen is an important part of rural wedding ceremonies. The masak baja is played to process with the groom's on their way to and from the bride's village. The masak is accompanied by two pipers and drummers. The masak and its accompanying instruments send a clear message across the audible area that a wedding is taking place. The masakbeen is also used in Choliya or Chaliya dance of Kumaon and Sudurpaschim province of Nepal.

== Discography ==
- Various Artists – Footprints In The Desert... track Rajasthan's Bagpipe (Mashak). De Kulture
- Various – Music From The Shrines Of Ajmer and Mundra track Populat Naubat Shahna'i. Topic Records (UK), 1995

== See also ==
- Titti (bagpipe), a Telugu bagpipe of Andhra Pradesh
- Sruti upanga, a drone bagpipe of Tamil Nadu
