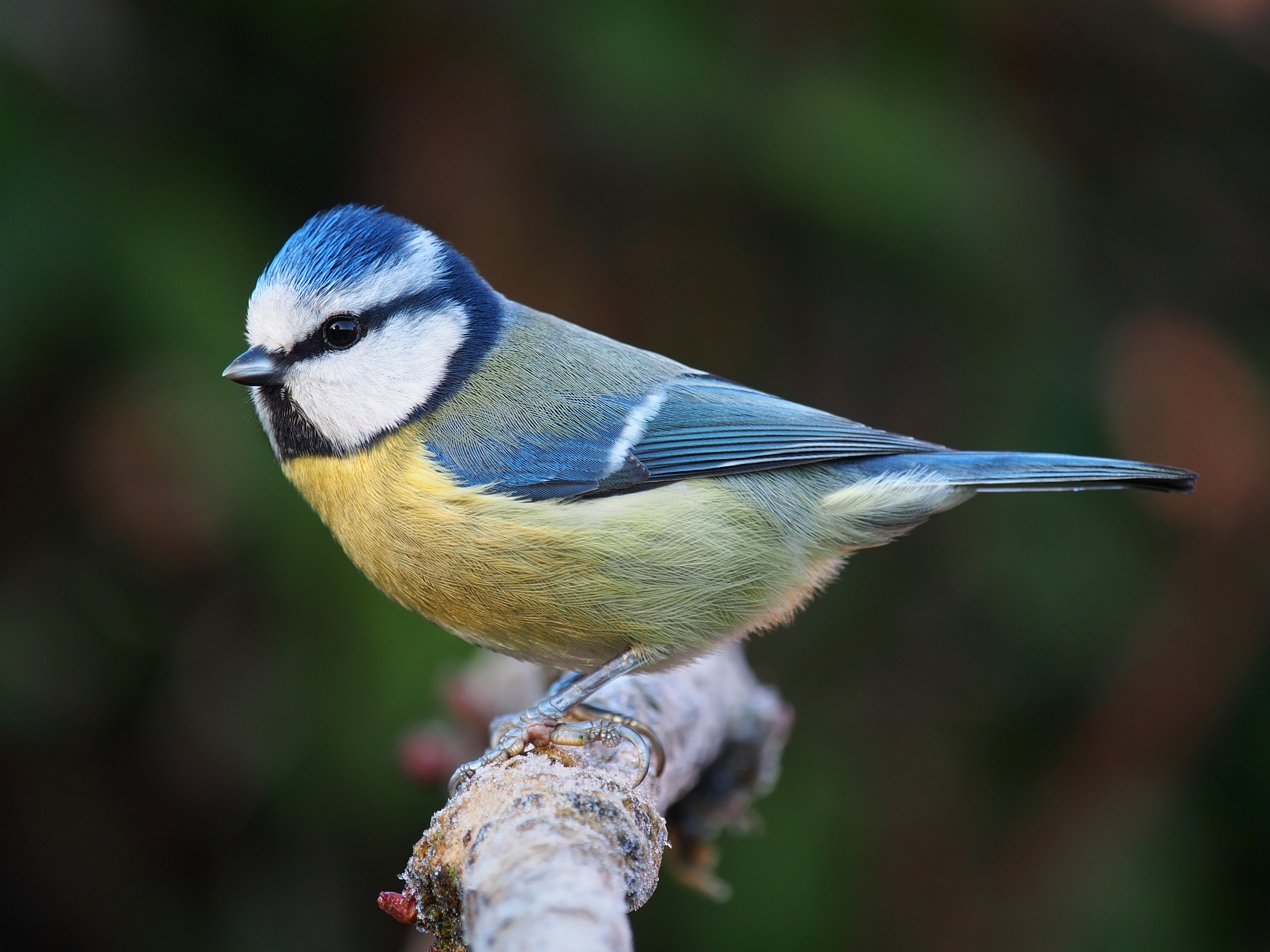
- Eurasian blue tit (Cyanistes caeruleus)

Scientific classification
- Kingdom: Animalia
- Phylum: Chordata
- Class: Aves
- Order: Passeriformes
- Family: Paridae
- Genus: Cyanistes; Kaup, 1829

Type species
- Parus caeruleus Linnaeus, 1758

Species
- C. caeruleus C. teneriffae C. cyanus

= Cyanistes =

Genus of birds

Cyanistes is a genus of birds in the tit family Paridae. The genus was at one time considered as a subgenus of Parus. In 2005 an article describing a molecular phylogenetic study that had examined mitochondrial DNA sequences from members of the tit family, proposed that a number of subgenera including Cyanistes be elevated to genus status. This proposal was accepted by the International Ornithologists' Union and the British Ornithologists' Union.

== Species ==
The genus contains three species:

Image	Scientific name	Common name	Distribution
	Cyanistes caeruleus	Eurasian blue tit	Europe
	Cyanistes teneriffae	African blue tit	northern Africa and the Canary Islands.
	Cyanistes cyanus	Azure tit	Russia and Central Asia and northwest China, Manchuria and Pakistan.

The name Cyanistes was introduced for a subgenus by the German naturalist Jakob Kaup in 1829. The word comes from the classical Greek kuanos meaning dark-blue. The type species was designated as the Eurasian blue tit by George Gray in 1842.
