= Tittie Butte =

Mountain in Oregon, United States

Coordinates: 44°47′20″N 120°04′01″W

Tittie Butte is a summit in Wheeler County, Oregon, in the U.S. with an elevation of 3,125 feet (952 m) NGVD 29.

== See also ==
- Breast-shaped hill
