= Tiptree Heath (hamlet) =

Hamlet in Essex, England

Coordinates: 51.8041°N 0.7266°E

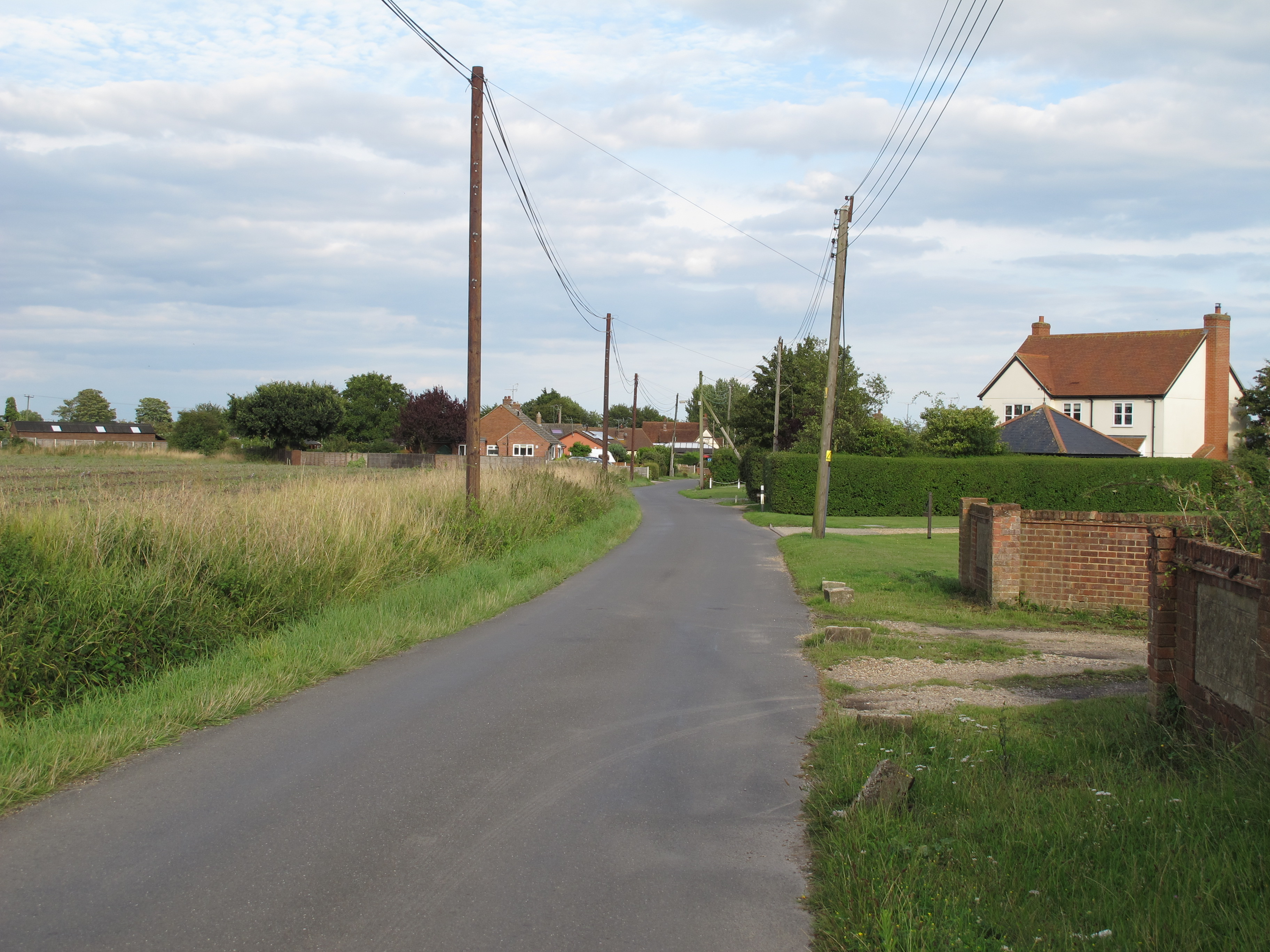
- West End Road

- Location within Essex
- Civil parish: Tiptree
- District: Colchester
- Shire county: Essex
- Region: East
- Country: England
- Sovereign state: United Kingdom
- Police: Essex
- Fire: Essex
- Ambulance: East of England

Tiptree Heath is a hamlet in the civil parish of Tiptree, in the Colchester district, in the county of Essex, England. Nearby settlements include the villages of Tiptree, Great Totham, Great Braxted and Little Totham. It is positioned on the B1022 road, with the B1023 and A12 roads passing nearby.

It is the location of a lowland heath called Tiptree Heath Nature Reserve which is classified as a Site of Special Scientific Interest.
