= Titty Hill =

Hamlet in West Sussex, England

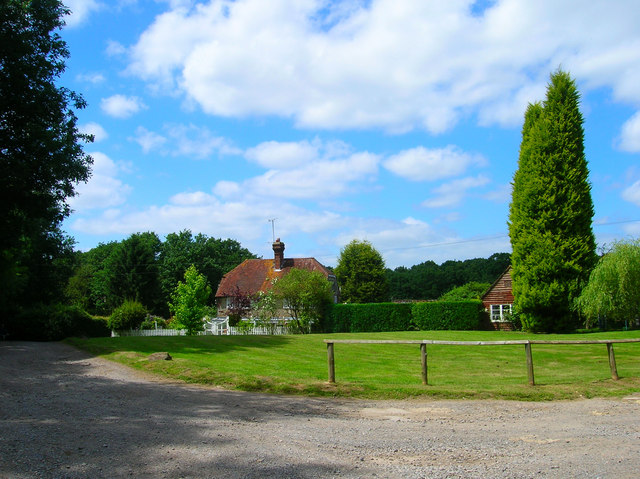
- Titty Hill Farm

- Location within England
- Coordinates: 51°01′28.2″N 0°46′55.2″W
- Kingdom: United Kingdom
- Country: England
- County: West Sussex
- Elevation: 212 ft (65 m)

Titty Hill is a hamlet in the civil parish of Milland in the Chichester district of West Sussex, England. It is close to a Roman way station or mansio on the Chichester to Silchester Way.

Because titty is a slang term for breast or nipple, Titty Hill has been frequently noted for its unusual place name.

== See also ==
- Breast-shaped hill
- List of United Kingdom locations: Ti
- Cocking, West Sussex
