= Timbrelham =

Hamlet in Cornwall, England

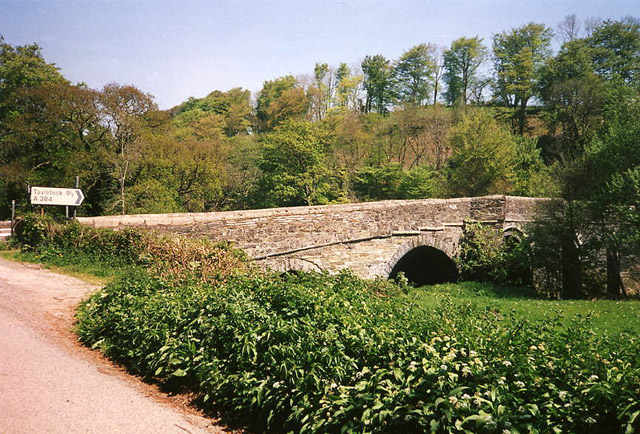
Greystone Bridge

Timbrelham is a hamlet in the parish of Lezant, Cornwall, England, United Kingdom. It is in the Tamar valley next to Greystone Bridge.
