= Tit-e Olya =

Tit-e Olya تيت عليا
- Village
- Location within Iran
- Coordinates: 35°59′00″N 45°26′00″E
- Country: Iran
- Province: West Azerbaijan
- County: Sardasht
- Bakhsh: Central
- Rural District: Alan

Population (2006)
  - Total: 70
- Time zone: UTC+3:30 (IRST)
  - Summer (DST): UTC+4:30 (IRDT)

Tit-e Olya (Persian: تيت عليا, also Romanized as Tīt-e ‘Olyā; also known as Tīt-e Bālā) is a village in Alan Rural District, in the Central District of Sardasht County, West Azerbaijan Province, Iran. At the 2006 census, its population was 70, in 13 families.
