= Tideford Cross =

Coordinates: 50°25′32″N 4°20′11″W

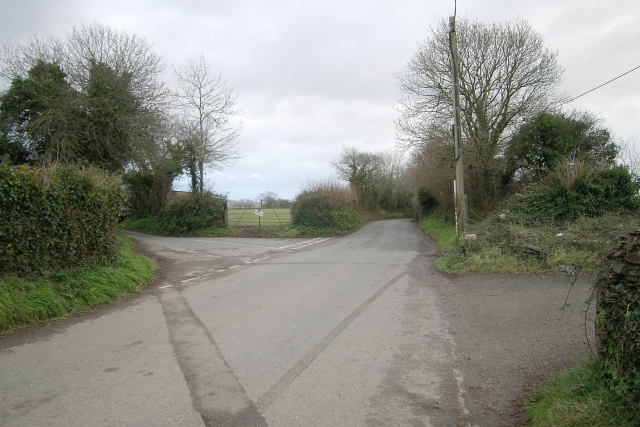
Tideford Cross

Tideford Cross is a hamlet in Cornwall, England, United Kingdom. It is about one mile north of Tideford.
