= Titi, Burundi =

- Location in Burundi
- Coordinates: 3°4′56″S 29°26′1″E
- Country: Burundi
- Province: Bubanza Province
- Commune: Commune of Musigati
- Time zone: UTC+2 (Central Africa Time)

Titi, Burundi is a village in the Commune of Musigati in Bubanza Province in north western Burundi.
