= Tit (name) =

Tit is a Christian Orthodox given name (Romanian, Russian, Slovenian), a variation of the Latin name Titus.

It may refer to:

- Tit Bud (1846–1917), priest, author, folklorist, translator, historian, aristocrat, and vicar
- Tit Liviu Chinezu (1904–1955), Romanian bishop
- Tit Simedrea (1886–1971), monk
- Tit Linda Sou (born 1989), female track and field sprint athlete
- Tit Štante (born 1998), Slovenian snowboarder
- Tit Turnšek (born 1938), Slovene diplomat and politician
