= Tilland =

Coordinates: 50.4323°N 4.3520°W

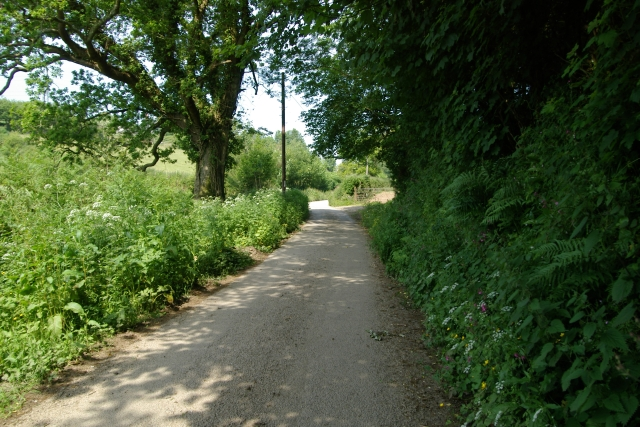
Road near Hay Lake Mill

Tilland is a hamlet in the parish of Quethiock, Cornwall, England, United Kingdom.
