= Timbersbrook =

Coordinates: 53.1607°N 2.1575°W

Timbersbrook is a small village in the town parish of Congleton, Cheshire, England.

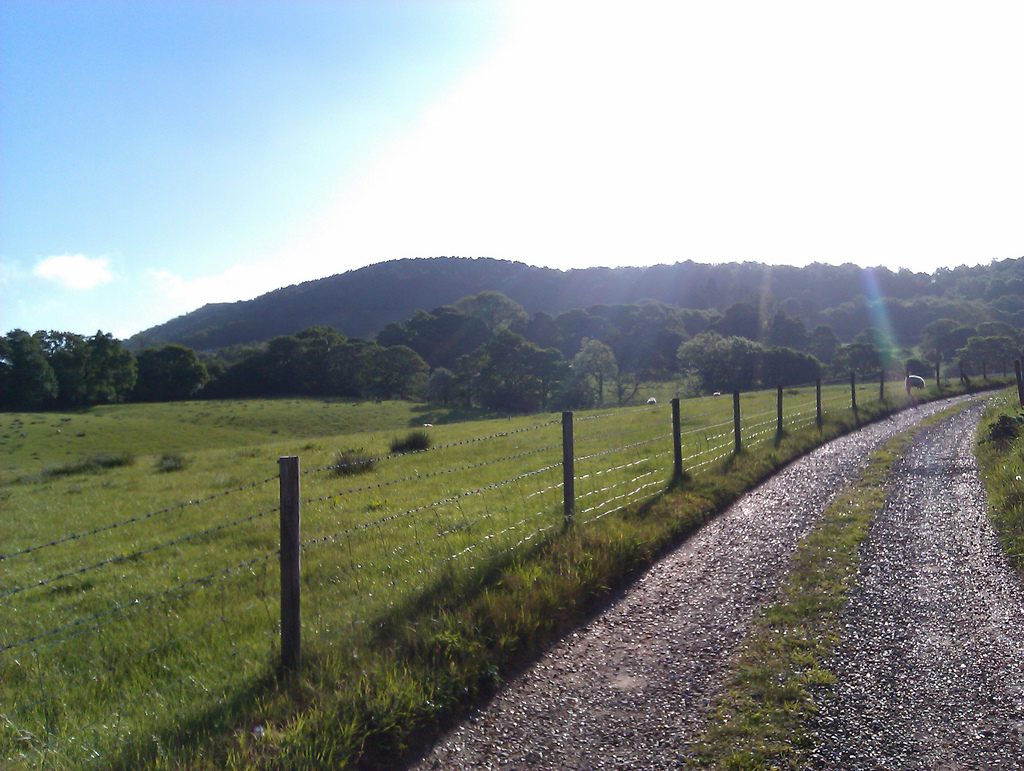
The Cloud from Timbersbrook
