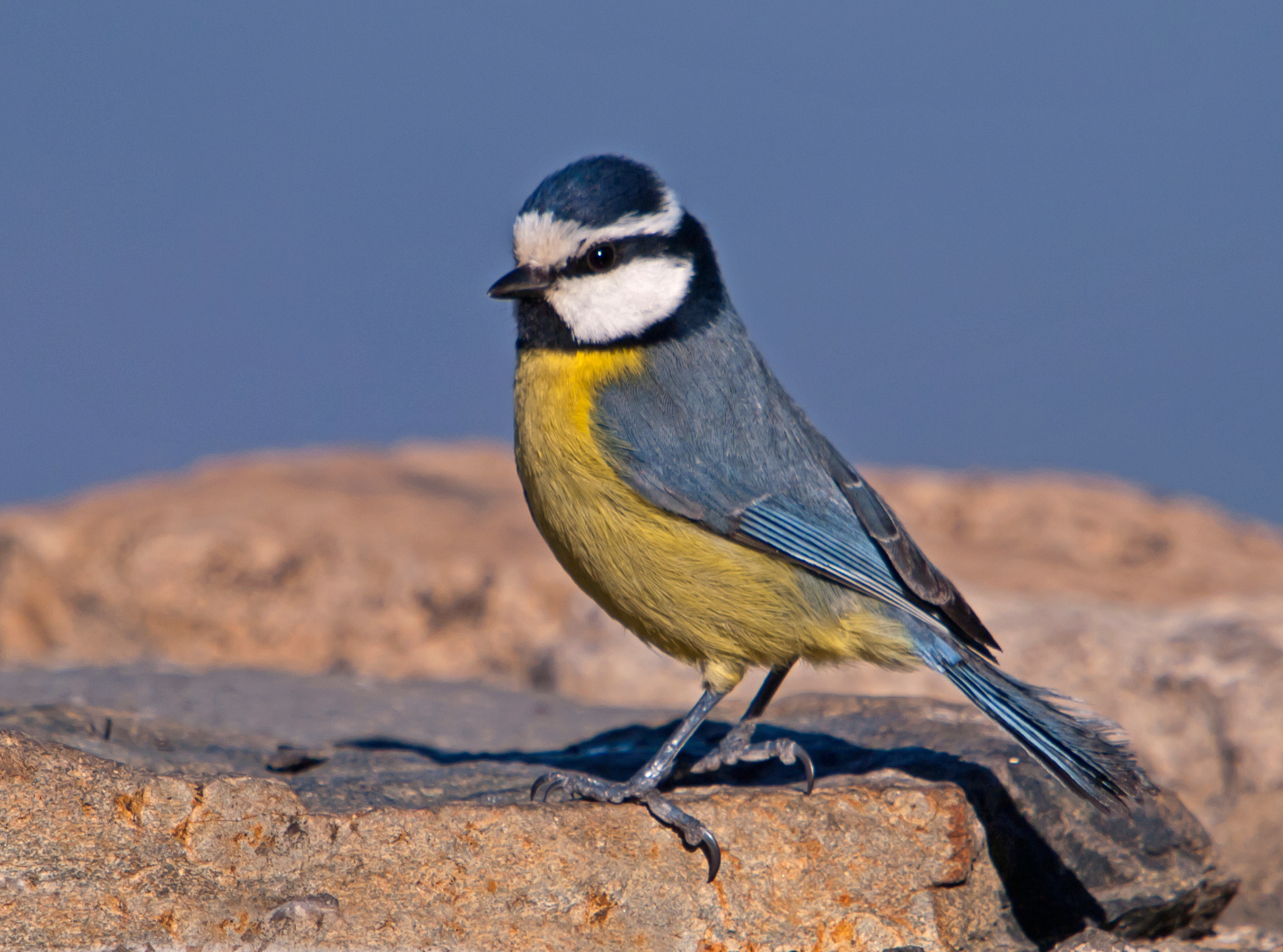

Conservation status
- Least Concern (IUCN 3.1)

Scientific classification
- Kingdom: Animalia
- Phylum: Chordata
- Class: Aves
- Order: Passeriformes
- Family: Paridae
- Genus: Cyanistes
- Species: C. teneriffae

Binomial name
- Cyanistes teneriffae (Lesson, 1831)
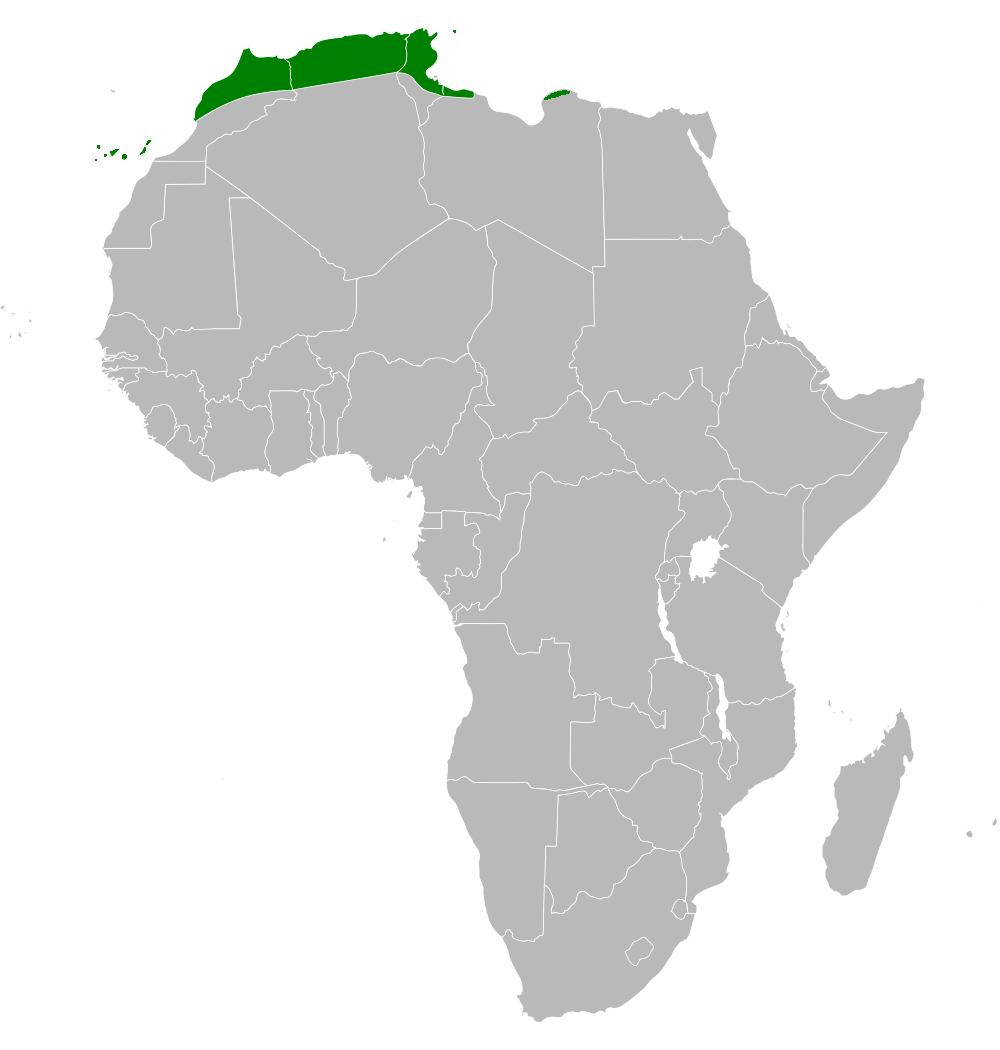

Synonyms
- Parus teneriffae Lesson, 1831

= African blue tit =

Species of bird

The African blue tit (Cyanistes teneriffae) is a species of bird in the family Paridae. It is found in northern Africa, Pantelleria (Italy) and the Canary Islands (Spain). Its natural habitat is temperate forests. This species and the Eurasian blue tit were formerly considered conspecific. The status of this species has not been assessed because it is noted to be common on the islands of Tenerife and Gran Canaria. The species has been used in many research studies due to its island populations and relevance to evolutionary hypotheses.

== Location ==
The African blue tit is found in Northern Africa, Pantelleria and the Canary Islands. It is widespread on the Islands of Tenerife and Gran Canaria, but scarce in local populations on Fuerteventura and Lanzarote.

== Description ==
The African blue tit ranges from 11–12 cm (4.3–4.7 in) in size. It is a small, sharp-billed, compact tit. The nominate race has a forehead and supercilium to centre of nape white, crown deep glossy blue, becoming blackish on the neck, with a blue dorsal and yellow ventral body. The song is a variable repetition of one or two notes.

== Diet ==
The species is known to consume a variety of caterpillars. The diet is not significantly different from the Eurasian blue tit.

== Habitat ==
The African blue tit prefers temperate forests, both low and high lying. Lowlands area preferred on Fuerteventura and Lanzarote, but populations on Tenerife and Gran Canaria prefer montane forests.

== Breeding ==
The species breeds from February to July, and also possibly from October to January. It usually breeds earlier at lower levels compared to in montane areas. Egg-laying occurs when the photoperiod is longer, and extra-pair mates are chosen and synchronises with the highest density of caterpillars available for prey. This is a resident species—juveniles remain at their natal site; they do not disperse once they fledge.

== Taxonomy ==
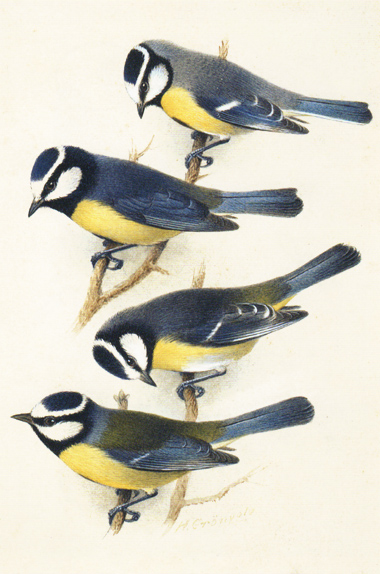
Canary Islands races

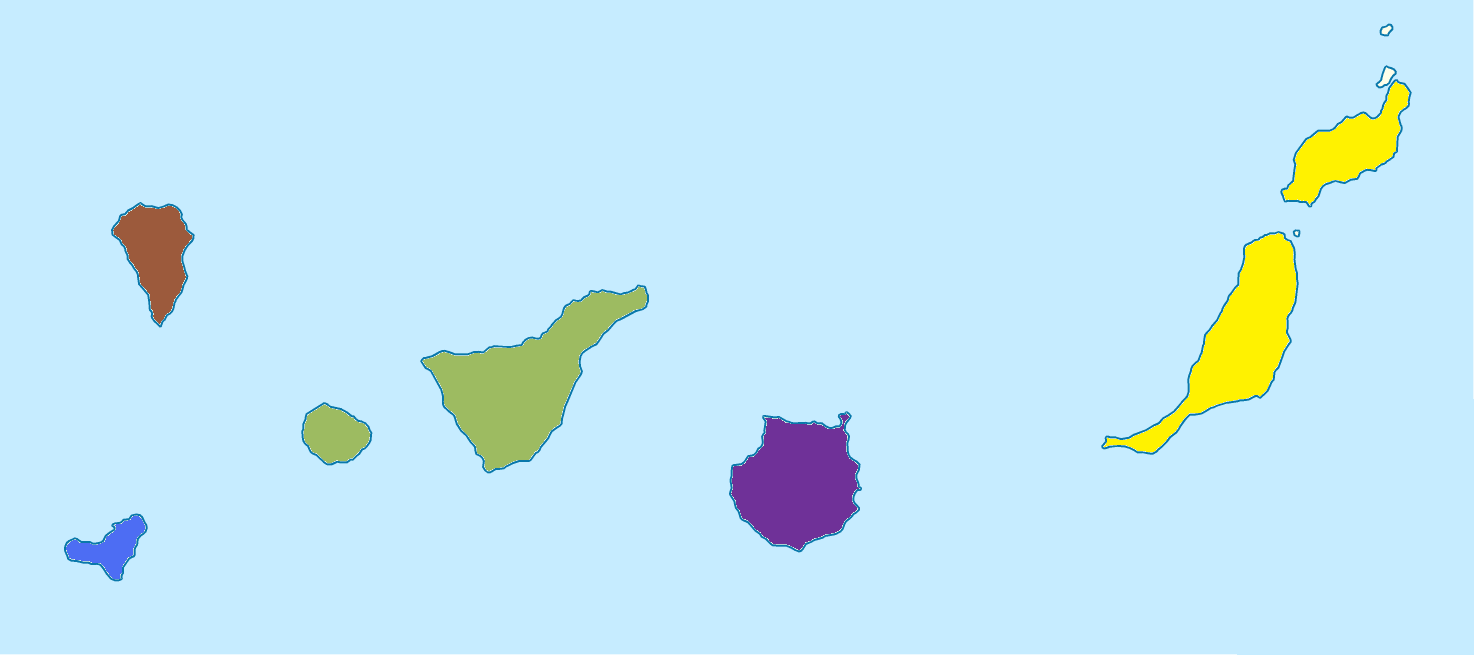
Ranges of the Canary Islands races of African blue tit Green: teneriffae Brown: palmensis Blue: ombriosus Purple: hedwigii Yellow: degener

This species and the Eurasian blue tit were formerly considered conspecific.

Subspecies are:

- C. t. palmensis – Palma blue tit – La Palma, in NW Canary Is.
- C. t. ombriosus – El Hierro (SW Canaries)
- C. t. teneriffae – Canary blue tit – La Gomera and Tenerife, in WC Canary Is.
- C. t. hedwigii – Gran Canaria, in C Canary Is.
- C. t. degener – Lanzarote and Fuerteventura, in E Canary Is.
- C. t. ultramarinus – Ultramarine tit – Pantelleria (Italy), NW Africa from Morocco E to N Tunisia
- C. t. cyrenaicae – Libyan blue tit – NE Libya. Endemic to the local mountains and forests, this is often regarded as a separate species and should be officially separated into a different distinct species: Cyanistes cyrenaicae.
- The Canary Islands' subspecies has a black cap, and the African form has a blue back. Research is underway to split these populations into distinct species, with a peculiar "leapfrog" distribution. Research published in 2007 found that African blue tits on the eastern Canary Islands of Fuerteventura and Lanzarote are indistinguishable from those in North Africa and so the subspecies degener should be regarded as a synonym of ultramarinus.
