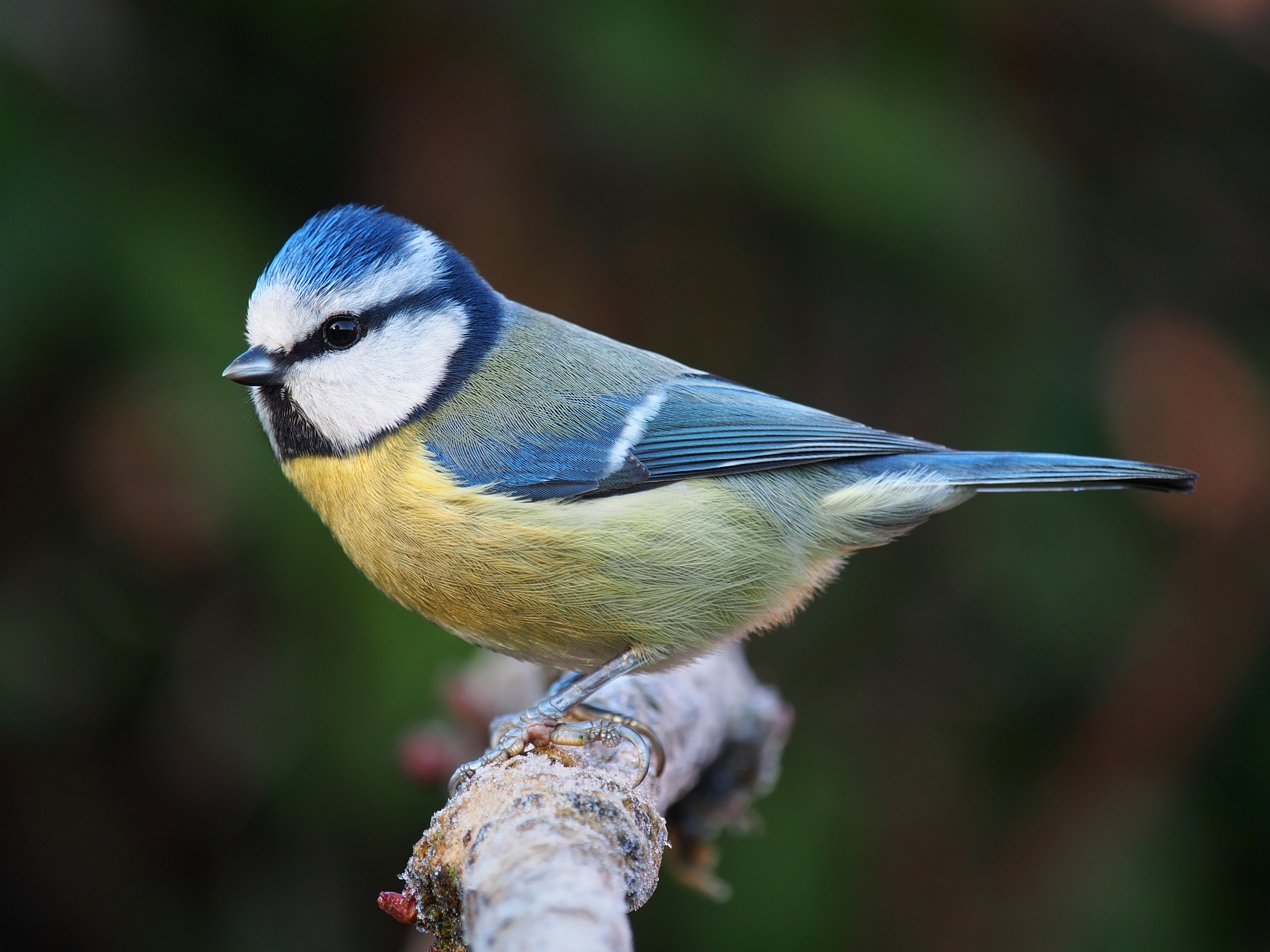
- Lancashire, United Kingdom

Conservation status
- Least Concern (IUCN 3.1)

Scientific classification
- Kingdom: Animalia
- Phylum: Chordata
- Class: Aves
- Order: Passeriformes
- Family: Paridae
- Genus: Cyanistes
- Species: C. caeruleus

Binomial name
- Cyanistes caeruleus (Linnaeus, 1758)
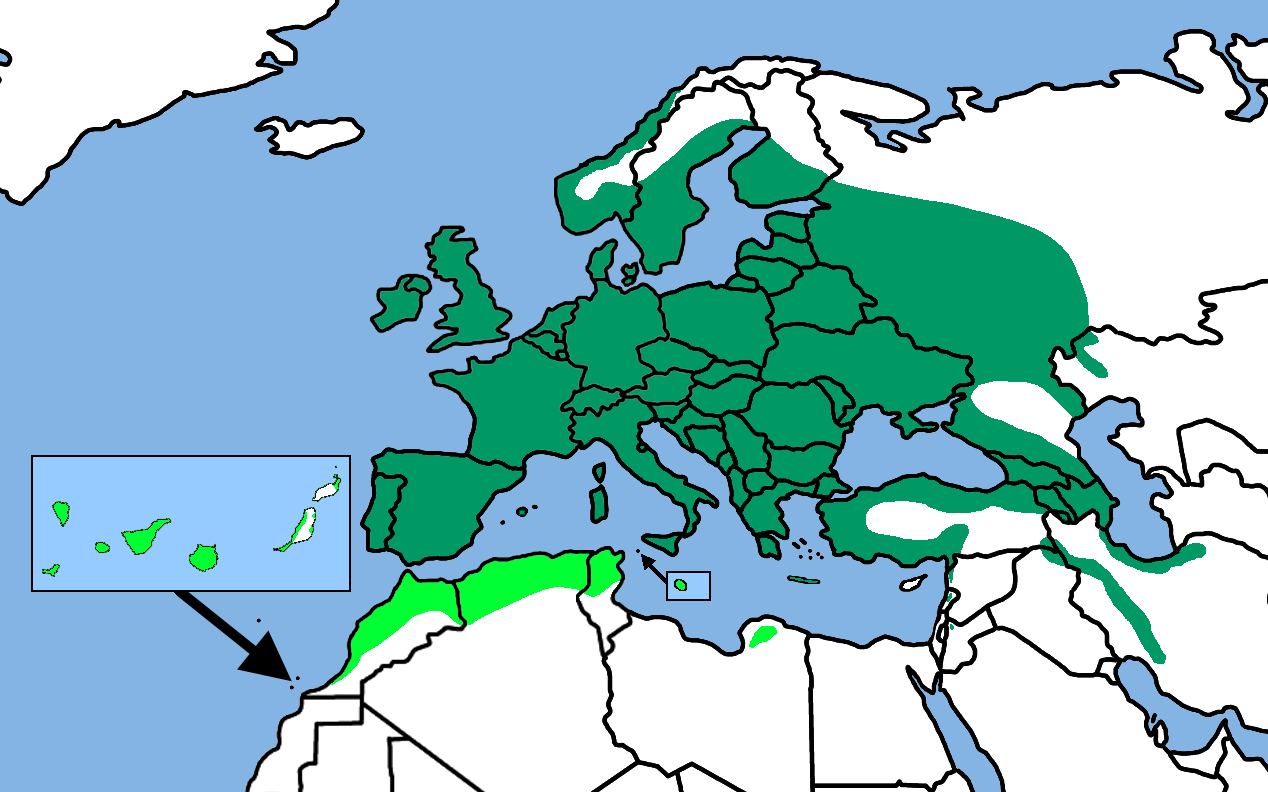
- Eurasian blue tit range African blue tit range

Synonyms
- Parus caeruleus Linnaeus, 1758

Audio
- Song

= Eurasian blue tit =

Species of bird

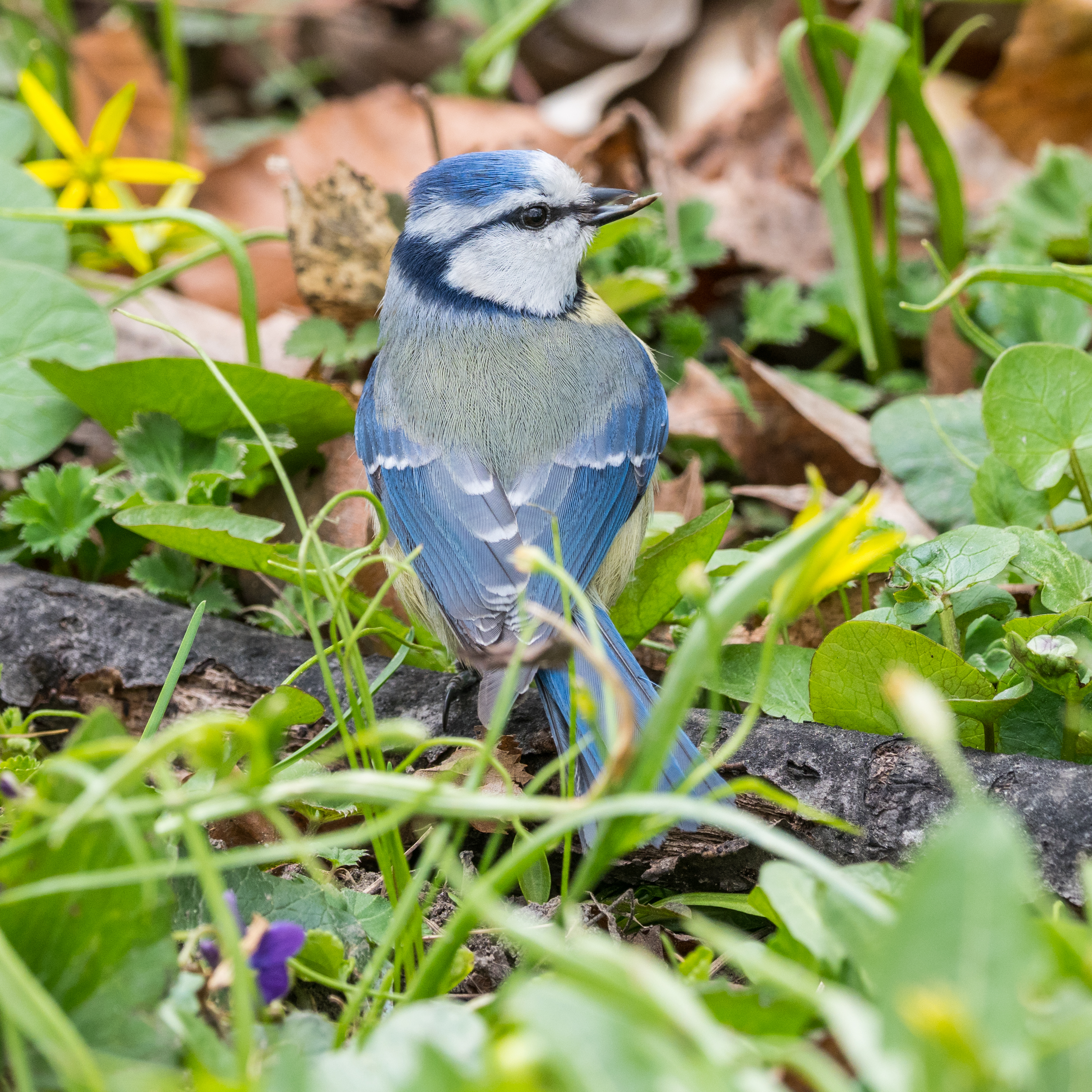
Eurasian blue tit on the ground, April

The Eurasian blue tit (Cyanistes caeruleus) is a small passerine bird in the tit family, Paridae. It is easily recognised by its blue and yellow plumage and small size.

The Eurasian blue tit is a widespread and common resident breeder throughout temperate and subarctic Europe and parts of western Asia. It inhabits deciduous or mixed woodlands, often with a high proportion of oak, and it is usually non-migratory. They typically nest in tree holes but readily adapt to using nest boxes when necessary. Their main rivals for nests and in the search for food are the larger, somewhat more common great tits (Parus major).

The Eurasian blue tit's diet consists mainly of insects and spiders. Outside of the breeding season, they also eat seeds and other plant-based foods. These birds are known for their acrobatic abilities; they can grip the outermost branches of trees and shrubs and hang upside down while searching for food.

== Taxonomy ==
The Eurasian blue tit was first described by Carl Linnaeus in 1758 in the 10th edition of his Systema Naturae under the binomial name Parus caeruleus. Parus is the classical Latin for a tit and caeruleus is the Latin for dark blue or caerulean. The type locality is Sweden. Two centuries earlier, before the introduction of the binomial nomenclature, the same Latin name had been used by the Swiss naturalist Conrad Gesner when he described and illustrated the blue tit in his Historiae animalium of 1555.

In 2005, analysis of the mtDNA cytochrome b sequences of the Paridae indicated that Cyanistes was an early offshoot from the lineage of other tits, and more accurately regarded as a genus rather than a subgenus of Parus. The current genus name, Cyanistes, comes from the Ancient Greek kuanos, "dark blue". The African blue tit (Cyanistes teneriffae) was formerly considered to be conspecific. The genus Cyanistes now contains three species, the Eurasian blue tit, the African blue tit, and the azure tit.

=== Subspecies ===
Nine subspecies are recognised. They differ mainly in the colour of the plumage but the variation is usually slight and clinal.

- C. c. obscurus – (Pražák, 1894): found in Ireland, Britain and Channel Islands
- C. c. caeruleus – (Linnaeus, 1758): the nominate subspecies, occurring in Continental Europe to northern Spain, Sicily, northern Turkey and northern Urals
- C. c. balearicus – (von Jordans, 1913): native to Majorca Island (Balearic Islands)
- C. c. ogliastrae – (Hartert, 1905): found in Portugal, southern Spain, Corsica and Sardinia
- C. c. calamensis – (Parrot, 1908): found in southern Greece, Pelopónnisos, Cyclades, Crete and Rhodes
- C. c. orientalis – Zarudny & Loudon, 1905: found in southern European Russia (Volga River to central and southern Urals)
- C. c. satunini – Zarudny, 1908: found in the Crimean Peninsula, Caucasus, Transcaucasia and northwestern Iran to eastern Turkey
- C. c. raddei – Zarudny, 1908: found in northern Iran
- C. c. persicus – (Blanford, 1873): found in the Zagros Mountains

=== Hybrids ===
Pleske's tit (Cyanistes × pleskei) is a common interspecific hybrid between this species and the azure tit (Cyanistes cyanus), in western Russia. Such birds can resemble azure tits, but have less white on their tails and a hint of yellow on their chests, or resemble blue tits, but have whitish underparts.

== Description ==
The Eurasian blue tit is usually 10.5–12 cm (4.1–4.7 in) long with a wingspan of 17.5–20 cm (6.9–7.9 in) for both sexes, and weighs about 11 g (0.39 oz). A typical blue tit has an intensely blue crown and a dark blue line passing through the eye and encircling the white cheeks and chin, giving the bird a very distinctive appearance. The forehead and a bar on the wing are white. The nape, wings and tail are blue, and the back is yellowish green. The underparts are mostly sulphur-yellow with a dark line down the abdomen; the intensity of this yellow colour is indicative of the number of yellow-green caterpillars consumed, due to high levels of carotene pigments in their diet. The bill is black, the legs are bluish grey, and the irises are dark brown. The sexes are similar and often indistinguishable to the human eye, but under ultraviolet light, the crown of the male is brighter blue. Juvenile birds are yellower and have fewer contrasting colours. They begin to resemble mature birds by September, although they retain some wing markings until May or June of the following year.

Blue tits can also see in ultraviolet light, which is one of the ways they can distinguish between male, female and juvenile birds. The cap of a male is a more intense shade of blue than that of a female or chick.

== Distribution and habitat ==
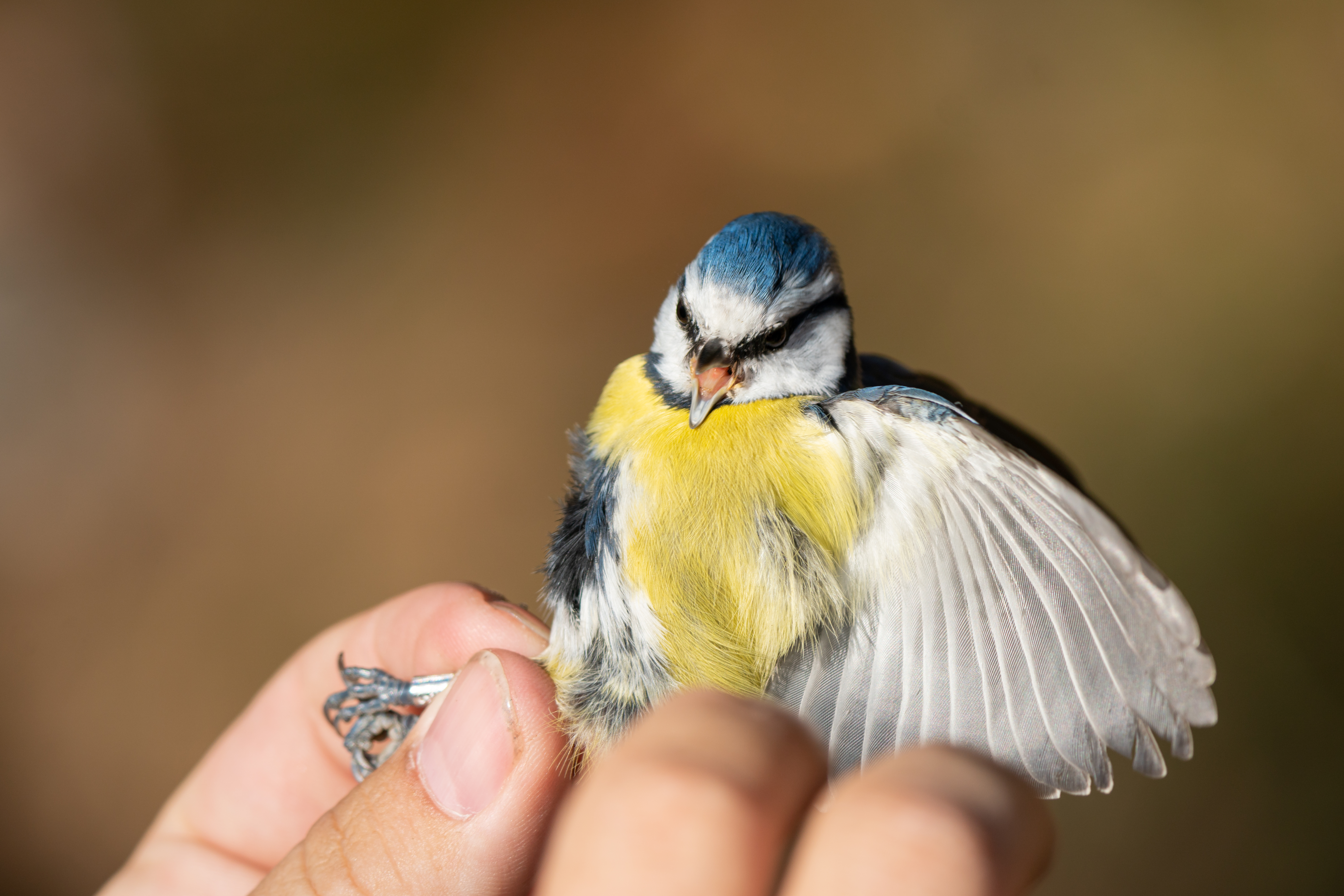
Blue tit displaying aggression during ringing

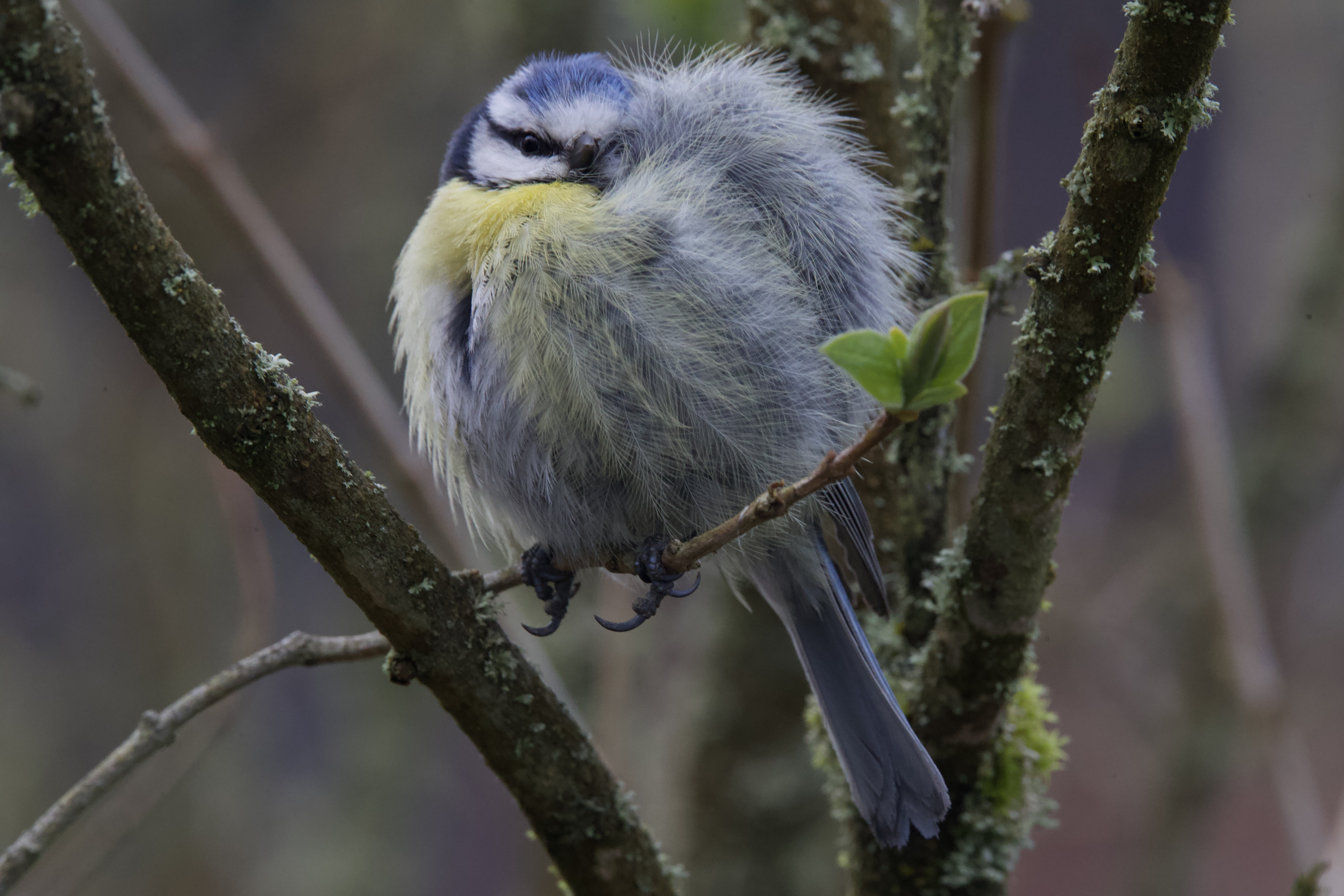
Blue tit recovering from a window strike, Czech Republic

There are currently around 20 to 44 million pairs in Europe.

The Eurasian blue tit and its hybrids are considered native species in areas of the European continent with mainly temperate or Mediterranean climates, as well as in parts of the Middle East. These areas include Ireland, the United Kingdom and most of the European Union and EFTA (except Malta, where they are considered vagrants, and Iceland, where they are absent), plus Albania, Andorra, Armenia, Azerbaijan, Belarus, Bosnia and Herzegovina, Georgia, Iran, Iraq, Jordan, Kazakhstan, Lebanon, Libya, Moldova, Montenegro, North Macedonia, Russia, San Marino, Serbia, Syria, Turkey, Vatican City and Ukraine. Birds from northwest Africa and the Canary Islands, which were formerly included, are now considered a separate species (see #Taxonomy, above).

In Great Britain the Eurasian blue tit can be found in a variety of environments, and is typically found in deciduous woodland, parks, gardens and even in the centre of towns.

== Behaviour and ecology ==
Eurasian blue tits and great tits form mixed winter flocks and the former are perhaps better at balancing on slender twigs. A Eurasian blue tit often ascends a tree trunk in short, jerky hops, reminiscent of a treecreeper. The bird usually roosts in ivy or evergreens, but in harsh winters it will roost wherever it can find a suitable small hole, whether in a tree or a nesting box. They are very agile and can hang from almost anywhere.

It is a common and popular European garden bird, due to its perky acrobatic performances when visiting bird feeders. It swings beneath the feeder, calling "tee, tee, tee" or a scolding "churr".

=== Breeding ===
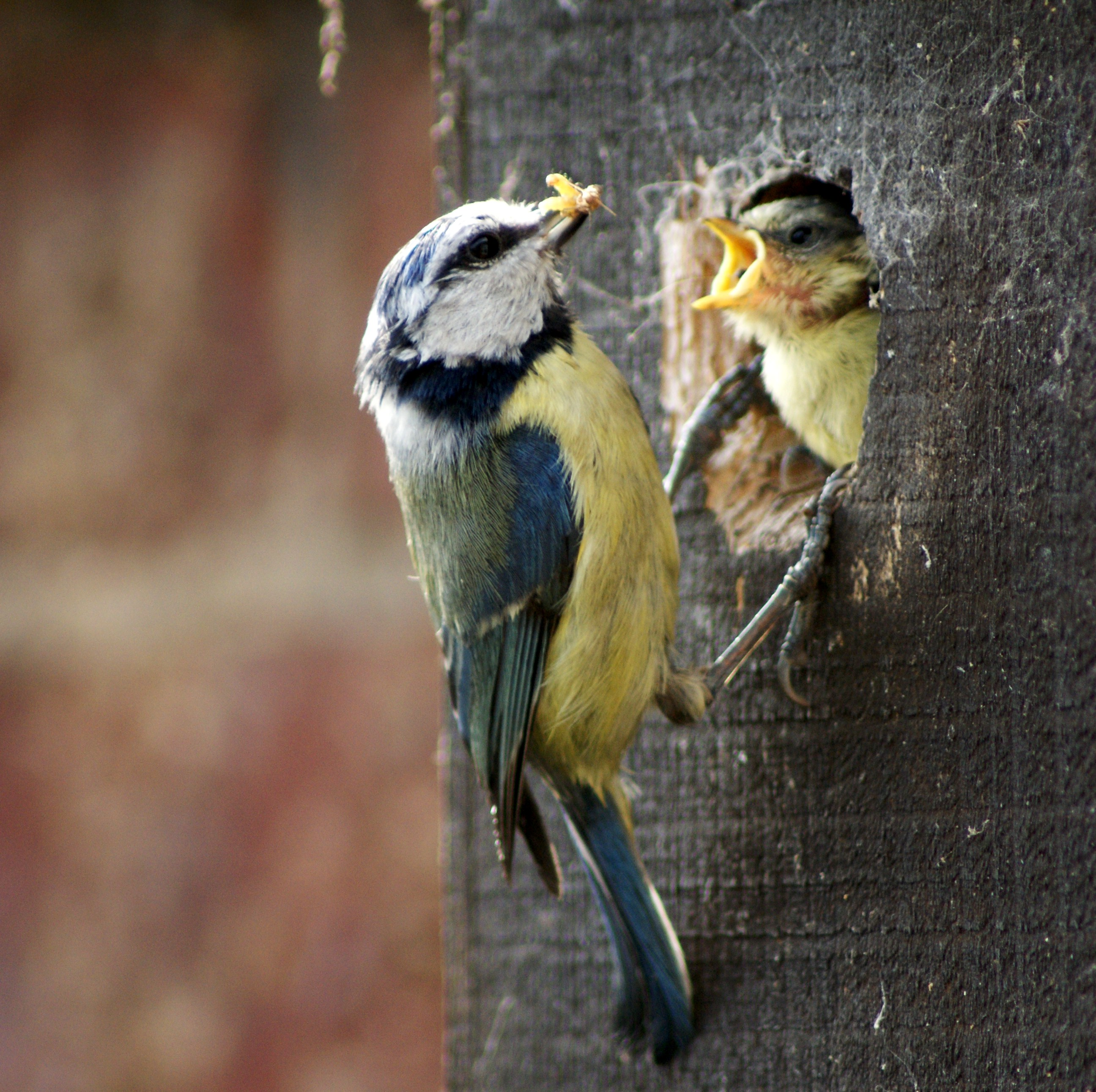
Feeding the young at a nest box in England

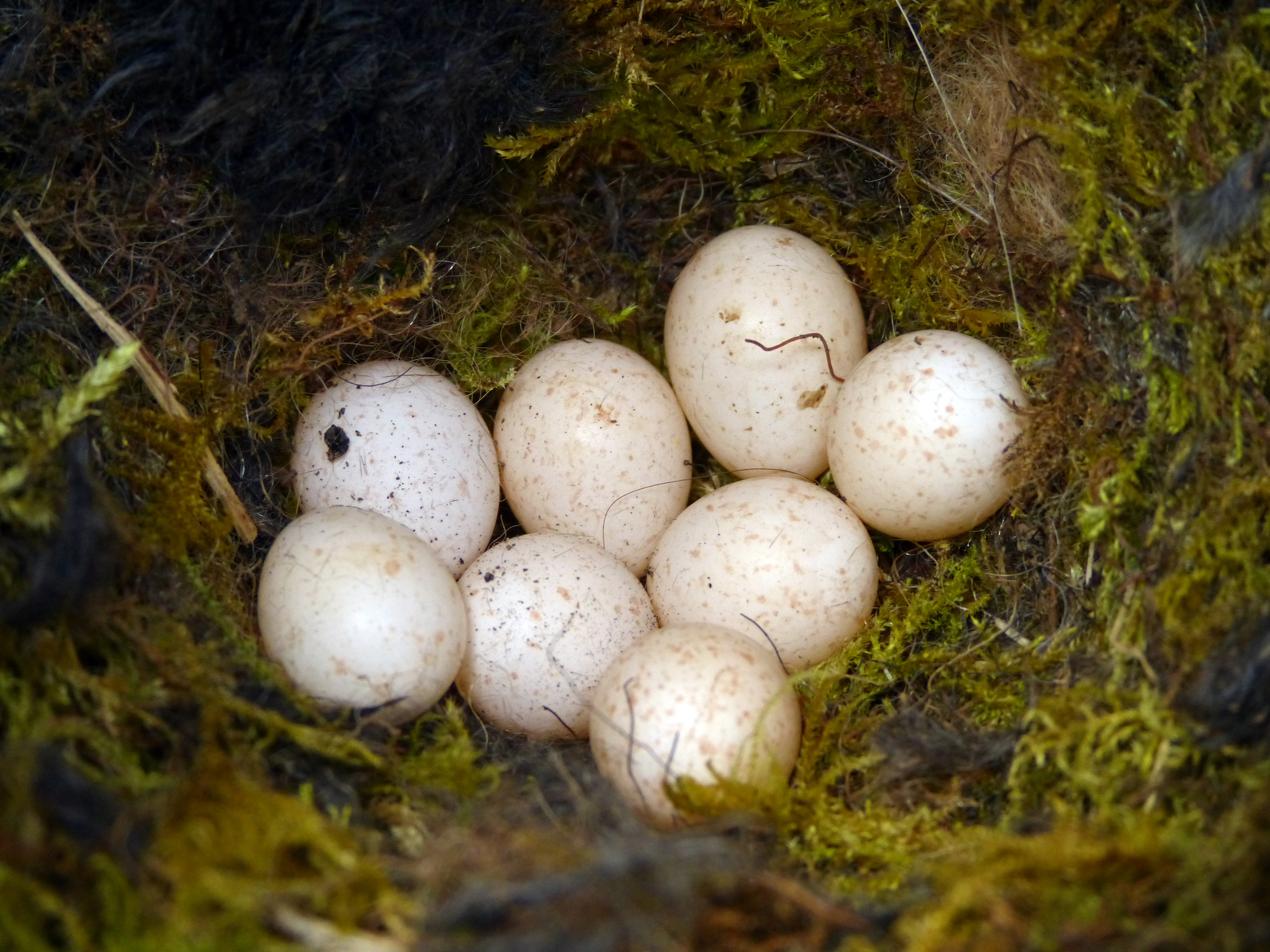
Eggs in a nest in England

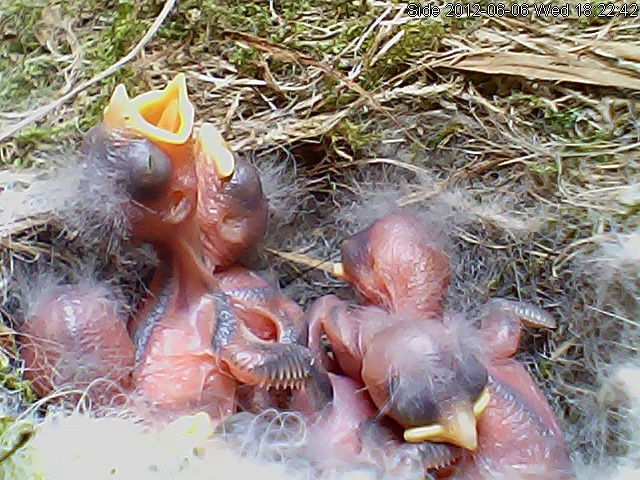
Young inside a nestbox in Nittedal, Norway

Feeding young

The Eurasian blue tit will nest in any suitable hole, whether in a tree, wall, or stump, or in an artificial nest box. They often compete with house sparrows or great tits for these sites. Few birds are more likely to accept the shelter of a nesting box, and the same hole is often used year after year. When one pair dies, another takes its place.

During the incubation period, the female blue tit does all of the incubating, while the male feeds her. During the nestling period, both female nest attendance and male feeding rates are higher in the morning, declining throughout the day. Although blue tits are socially monogamous, they regularly engage in extra-pair copulations with other individuals.

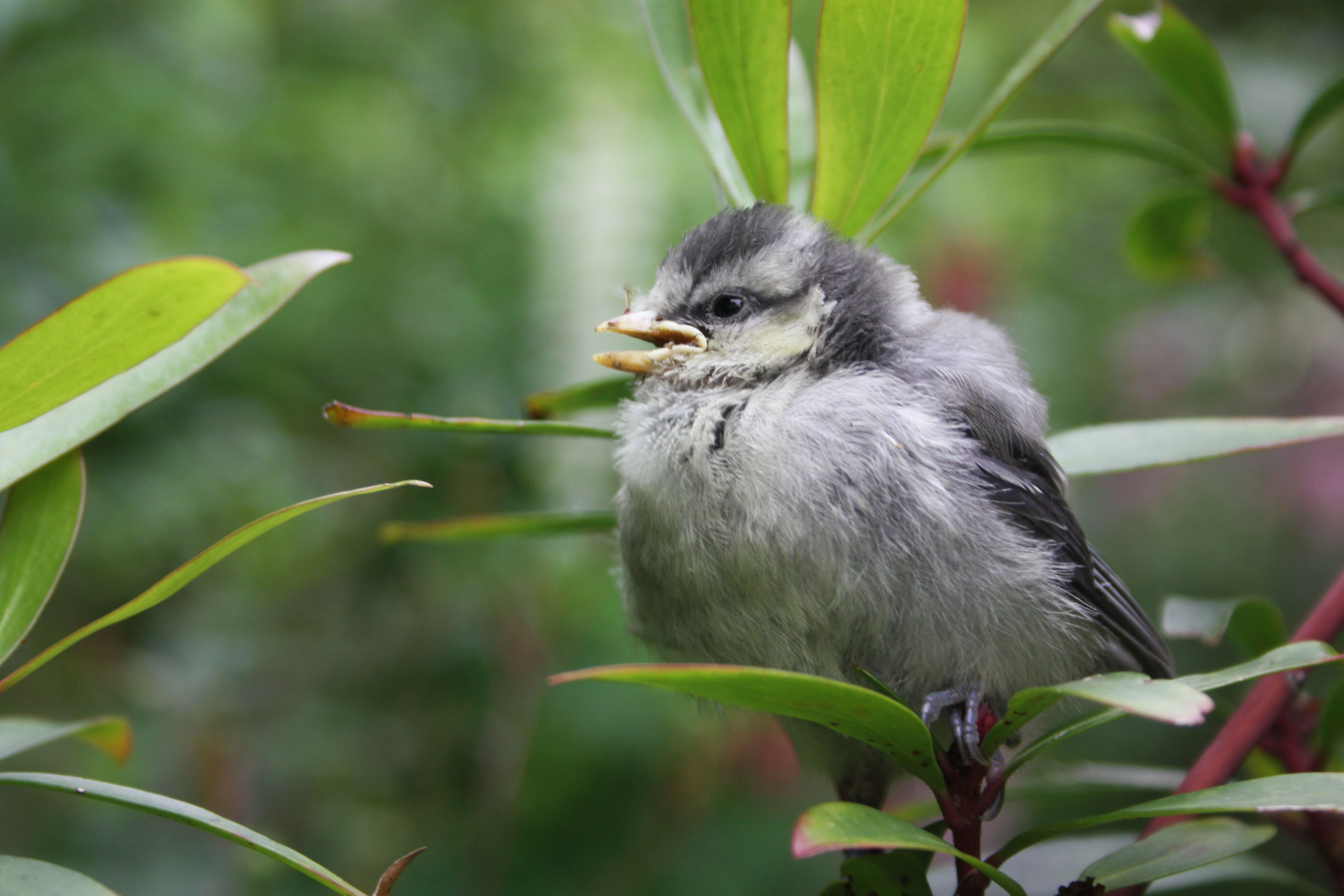
Juvenile in Pimlico, London

Eggs are 14–18 mm (0.55–0.71 in) long and 10.7–13.5 mm (0.42–0.53 in) wide. Egg size appears to depend mostly on the size of individual females and secondarily on habitat, with smaller eggs found at higher altitudes. The clutch's total weight can be 1.5 times as heavy as the female bird. A study found that the timing of breeding in blue tits is related to the expression of nestling carotenoid‐based coloration, which could play a role in offspring–parent communication.

Eurasian blue tits sit closely on their nests, hissing and biting at any intruding fingers. In the southwest of England, this behaviour has earned the species the colloquial nickname "Little Billy Biter" or "Billy Biter". When protecting its eggs, it raises its crest, but this is a sign of excitement rather than anger, as it is also elevated during the nuptial display.

The nesting material is usually moss, wool, hair, and feathers, and the eggs are laid in April or May. The number in the clutch is often very large, but seven or eight eggs are normal. Clutch size varies with latitude and other geographic parameters. In some locations, larger clutches may be laid by two or even more hens, but single-hen clutches of 14 have been verified in the UK. During the height of the breeding season, it is not unusual for a single bird to feed the chicks in the nest at a rate of one feeding every 90 seconds. In winter, they form flocks with other tit species.

An analysis of ring-recovery data in Britain revealed that the survival rate for juveniles in their first year was 38%, compared to an annual survival of 53% for adults. This suggests that the typical life expectancy of a bird upon reaching breeding age is three years. The oldest recorded blue tit in Britain was ringed in Bedfordshire and lived for 10 years and 3 months, while the oldest bird overall was ringed in the Czech Republic and lived for 11 years and 7 months.

=== Food and feeding ===
Eating peanuts from a garden bird feeder in England

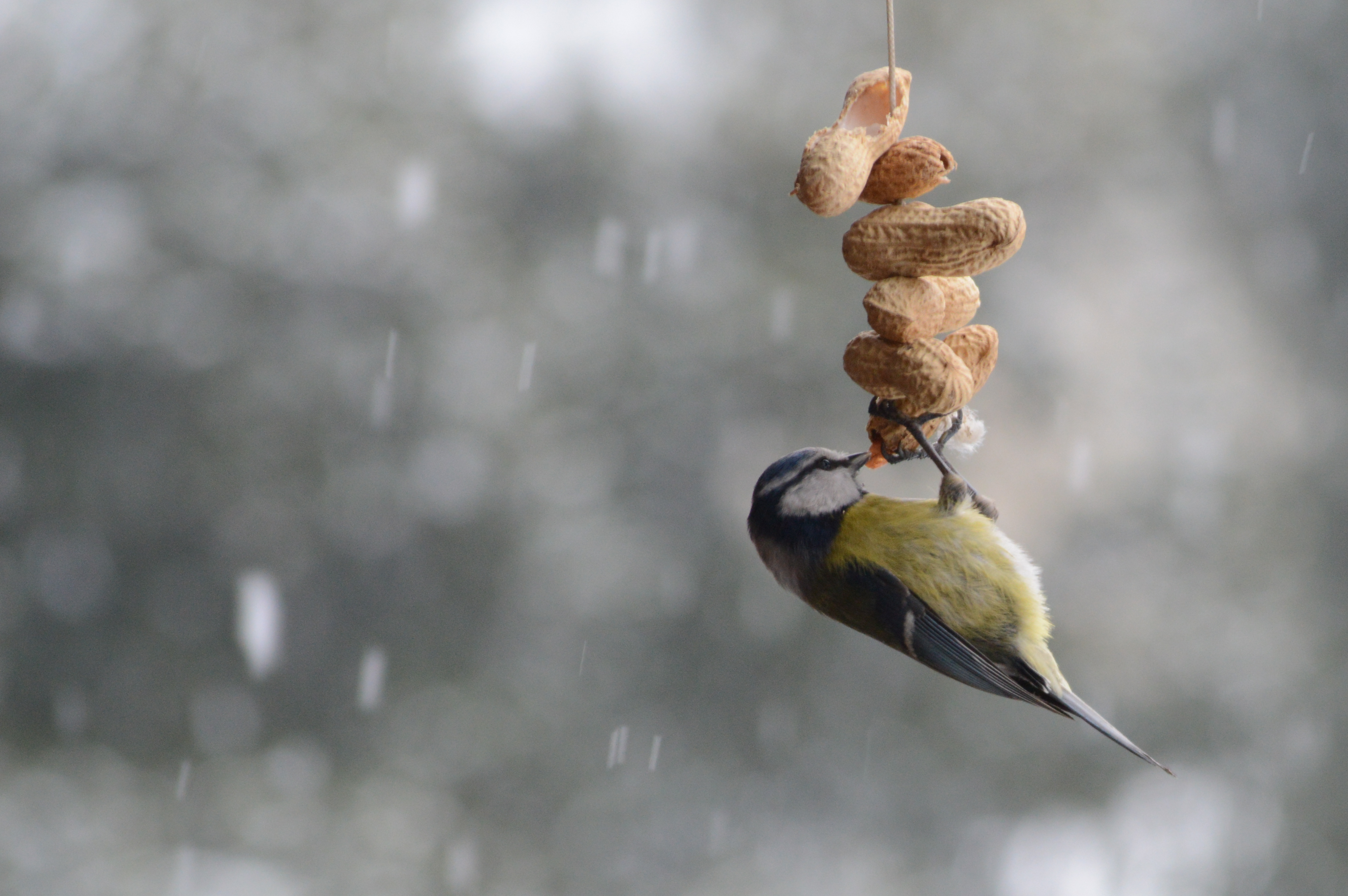
Eurasian blue tit eating peanuts from a string, Italy

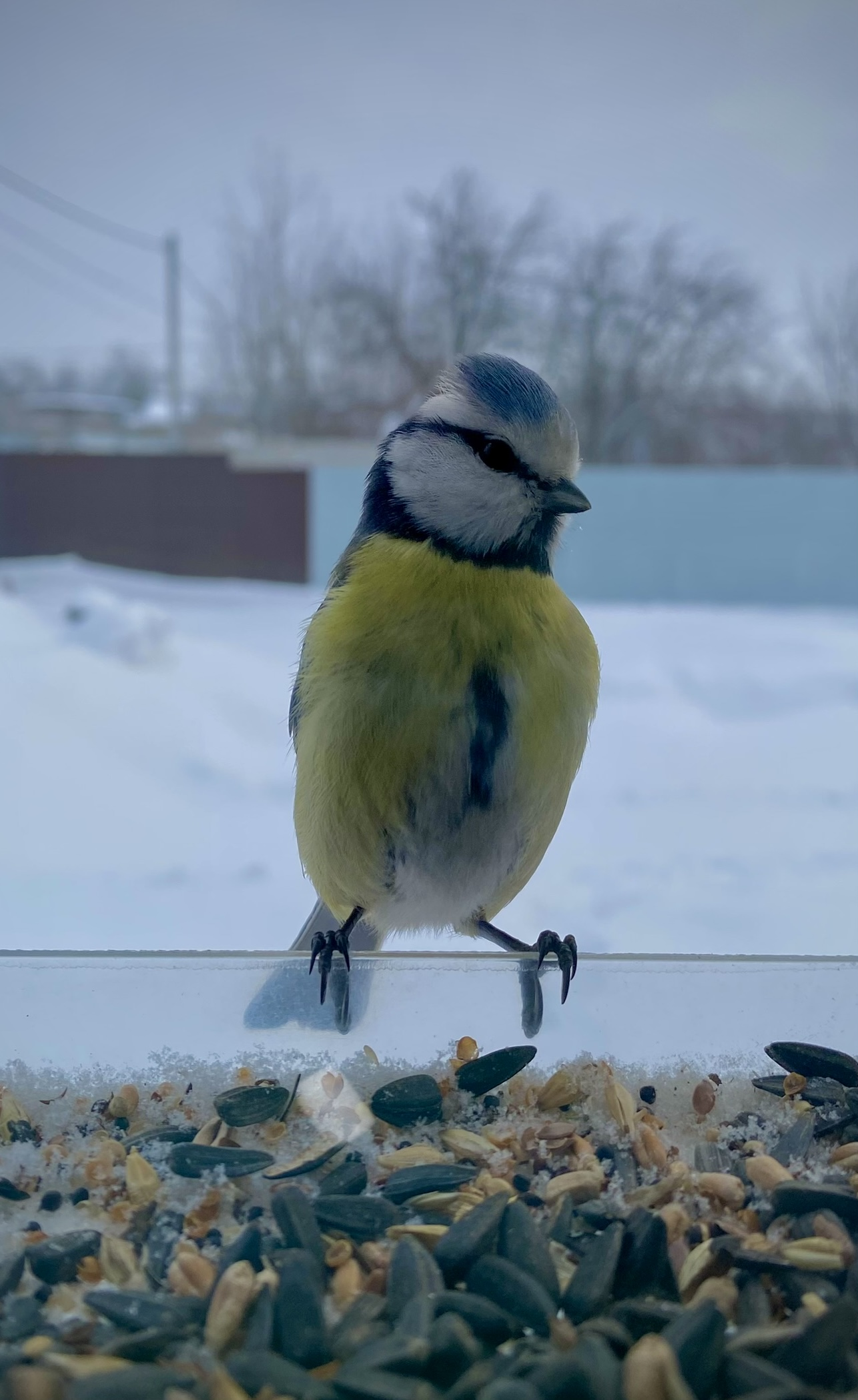
Blue tit on a feeder in winter in Russia

The Eurasian blue tit's diet consists mainly of insects, spiders and other small invertebrates, but it will also eat fruits and seeds outside of the breeding season. Animal items taken include springtails (Collembola), grasshoppers (Orthoptera), damselflies (Odonata), earwigs (Dermaptera), moths (Lepidoptera) and lacewings (Neuroptera). It often takes items while hanging upside-down. While foraging, it probes into opening buds and peels bark from hazel trees (Corylus). It rarely hovers and only very occasionally forages on the ground. It visits bird tables and takes bread, cheese, fat and a variety of seeds, especially sunflower seeds (Helianthus. Large seeds are carried to a nearby branch, where they are opened by holding the seed with one foot while hammering it with the bill.

=== Voice ===
Calls of a blue tit

Eurasian blue tits use songs and calls throughout the year. Songs are mostly performed in late winter and spring to defend the territory or to attract mates. Calls are used for multiple reasons, the most important of which is communication with other Eurasian blue tits. They inform one another of their location in trees by means of contact calls. They use alarm-calls to warn others (including birds of other species such as the great tit, the European robin or the treecreeper) about the predators in the area. Scolding, for example, is used when a ground predator (e.g. fox, cat or dog), a low-flying predator or a perched owl are noticed, and sometimes this is followed by mobbing behaviour in which birds gather together in flocks to counter a predator.

The alarm whistle warns other birds of the proximity of potential aerial predators such as Eurasian sparrowhawks, a northern goshawks, and common buzzards. Both partners make a series of high-pitched 'zeedling' notes are given by both partners before and during copulation. The begging call is used by juveniles to beg for food from their parents. The acoustic structure of these begging calls changes during nestling development, changing from pure-tone, low-frequency, soft calls in the early stages of development to white-noise, hiss-like, calls of lower frequency. The information conveyed by begging calls can be masked by anthropogenic noise, and the age-related variation in calls may mean some phases of nestling development are more vulnerable to this disruption than others.

=== Learned behaviour ===
An interesting example of culturally transmitted learning in birds is the phenomenon, dating from the 1920s, of blue tits teaching one another to open traditional British milk bottles with foil tops to access the cream underneath. Such behaviour has since been gradually suppressed due to the declining popularity of both full-fat milk and milk delivery. In addition, the instinct to strip bark from trees in search of insects has developed into a tendency to peel building materials such as thatch, wallpaper, stucco and window putty.

=== Predators and natural threats ===
The small size of the Eurasian blue tit makes it vulnerable to predation by larger birds such as jays, which catch the vulnerable fledglings when they leave the nest. The most important predators are probably the Eurasian sparrowhawk, and the domestic cat. Nests may also be robbed by mammals such as weasels and red squirrels, as well as introduced grey squirrels in the UK.

Successful chick breeding depends on a sufficient supply of green caterpillars, as well as favourable weather. Breeding seasons may be badly affected if the weather is unseasonably cold and wet between May and July, particularly if this coincides with the emergence of caterpillars on which the nestlings are fed.

=== Parasites ===
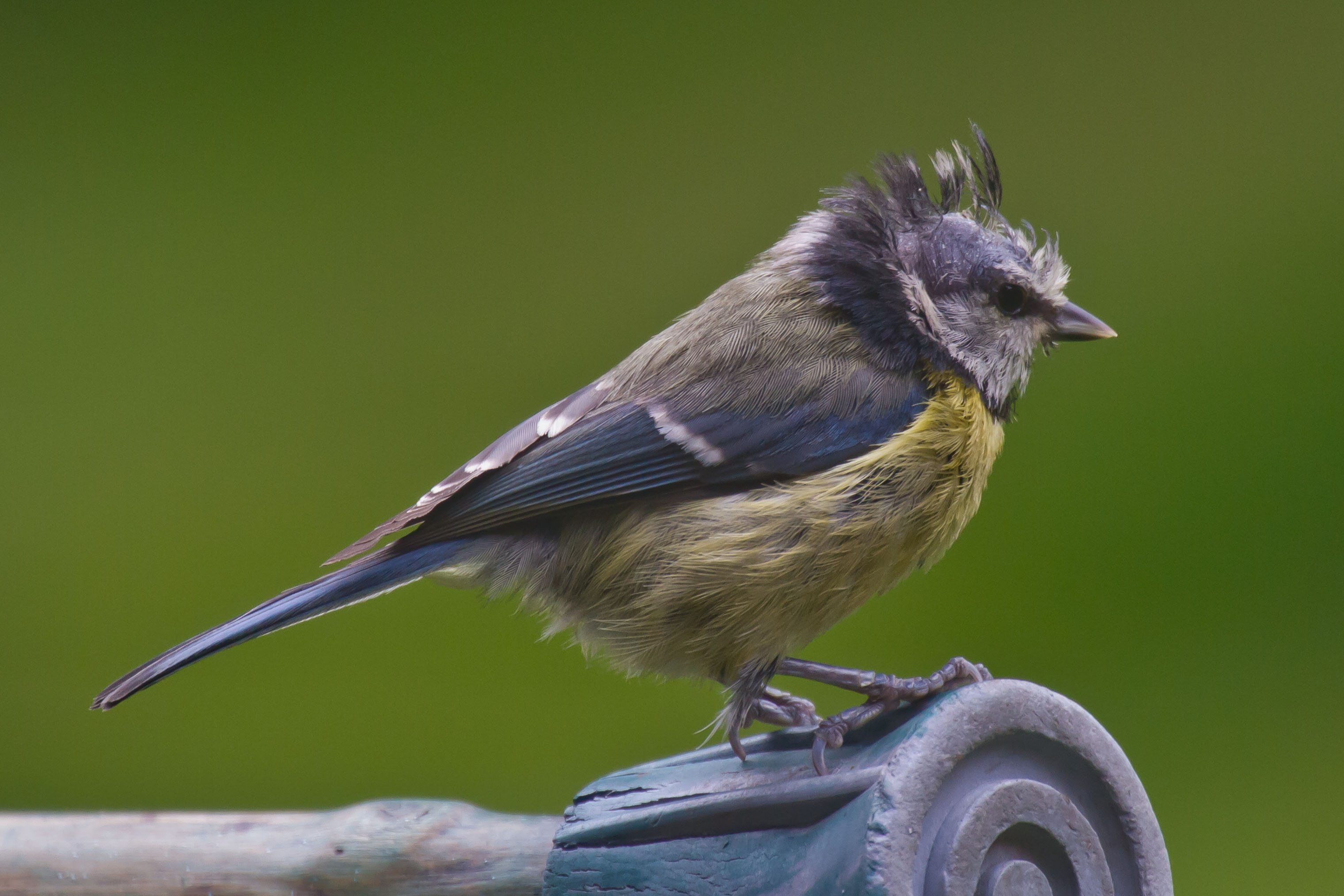
A bald blue tit with mite disease

Eurasian blue tits are known to be host to feather mites, and occasionally lice and flat flies. In Europe, the only feather mite species known to live on blue tits is Proctophyllodes stylifer. However, this mite does not appear to cause any harm to the bird, as it is only known to feed on dead feather tissue. P. stylifer lives through all its developmental stages, i.e. egg, larva, protonymph, tritonymph and adult, within the plumage of the same host. The usual sites where P. stylifer is encountered are in the remiges and the rectrices of the bird where they can be found randomly positioned between the barbs of the rachis.

== Status and conservation ==
The long-term population trend of the Eurasian blue tit in Europe is positive, with numbers increasing by 30 per cent between 1980 and 2016. During this period, the range limit shifted northwards by 500 km (310 mi) in Fennoscandia. Laying dates have advanced, and the warmer springs increase the likelihood of second broods. The species is classified as a of least concern in the Red list of the International Union for Conservation of Nature, and as a Green Status species, since 1996, by the Royal Society for the Protection of Birds in the United Kingdom.

== Cultural significance ==
The Eurasian blue tit has appeared on many stamps and ornaments. Its most recent appearance on a British stamp was in the 2025 "Garden Wildlife" series.

== Sources ==
- Cramp, Stanley; Perrins, C.M., eds. (1993). "Parus caeruleus Blue tit". Handbook of the Birds of Europe the Middle East and North Africa. The Birds of the Western Palearctic. Vol. VII: Flycatchers to Strikes. Oxford: Oxford University Press. pp. 225–248. ISBN 978-0-19-857510-8.
