= Titti (bagpipe) =

The titti (Telugu: titti, masaka titti, or tutti) is a type of bagpipe played in Andhra Pradesh, India, made from an entire goat-skin. The instrument is described as a goatskin with a double-reed inserted into one leg, and a bamboo blowpipe into the other. The term tittii is used in Telugu, Kannada, and Malayalam.

== History ==
Several paintings possibly depicting bagpipes are shown in Kerala, from the early eighteenth century.

Colonel James Tod (1782–1835 CE) notes that the Yanadis, a forest tribe in Madras, also play the bagpipes,

== Usage ==
The instrument is often used to provide solely a constant drone. References note the instrument being used as a drone accompaniment by storytellers and singers, as well as for village dance-dramas.

== See also ==
- Mashak, a Northern Indian bagpipe
- Sruti upanga, a bagpipe of Tamil Nadu.
