= Timekeeper (disambiguation) =

Timekeeper is a person that measures the passage of time.

Timekeeper(s) or The Timekeeper(s) may also refer to:

- Timekeeper (instrument), a timepiece
- The Time Keeper, a 2012 novel by Mitch Albom
- The Timekeeper, a 1992 Circle-Vision 360° film that was presented at three Disney parks around the world
- The Timekeeper (2009 film), a Canadian drama film directed by Louis Bélanger
- The Timekeeper, a 2007 novel by Rob Kidd in the Pirates of the Caribbean: Jack Sparrow series
- Timekeeper, the first book of the Timekeeper trilogy by Tara Sim
- Timekeepers, a British game show
- An alias of Vertin, a fictional character from Reverse: 1999
