= Village hall =

Public building used by a local community

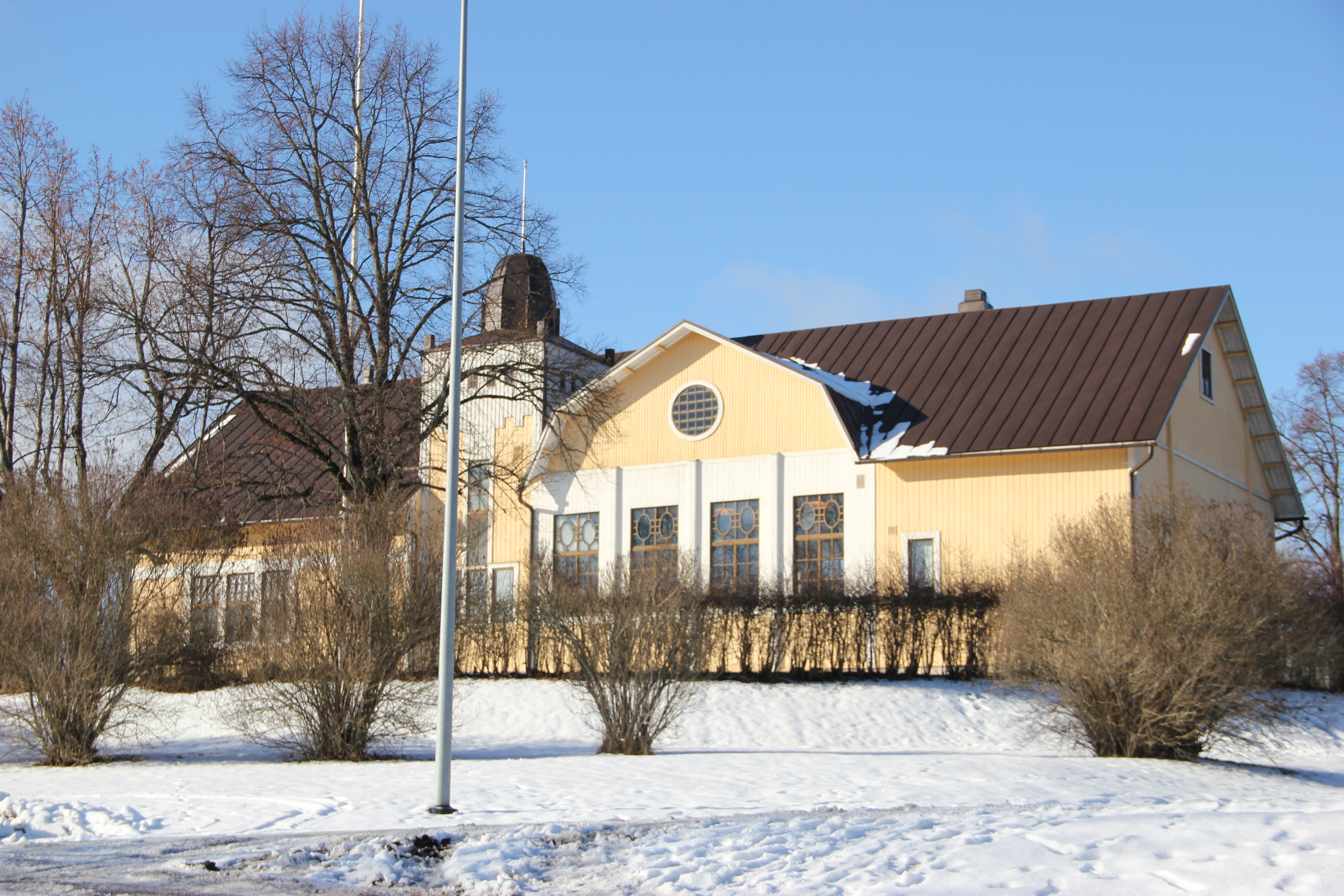
Former village hall in Vihti, Finland

A village hall is a public building in a rural or suburban community which functions as a community centre without a religious affiliation.

== United Kingdom ==
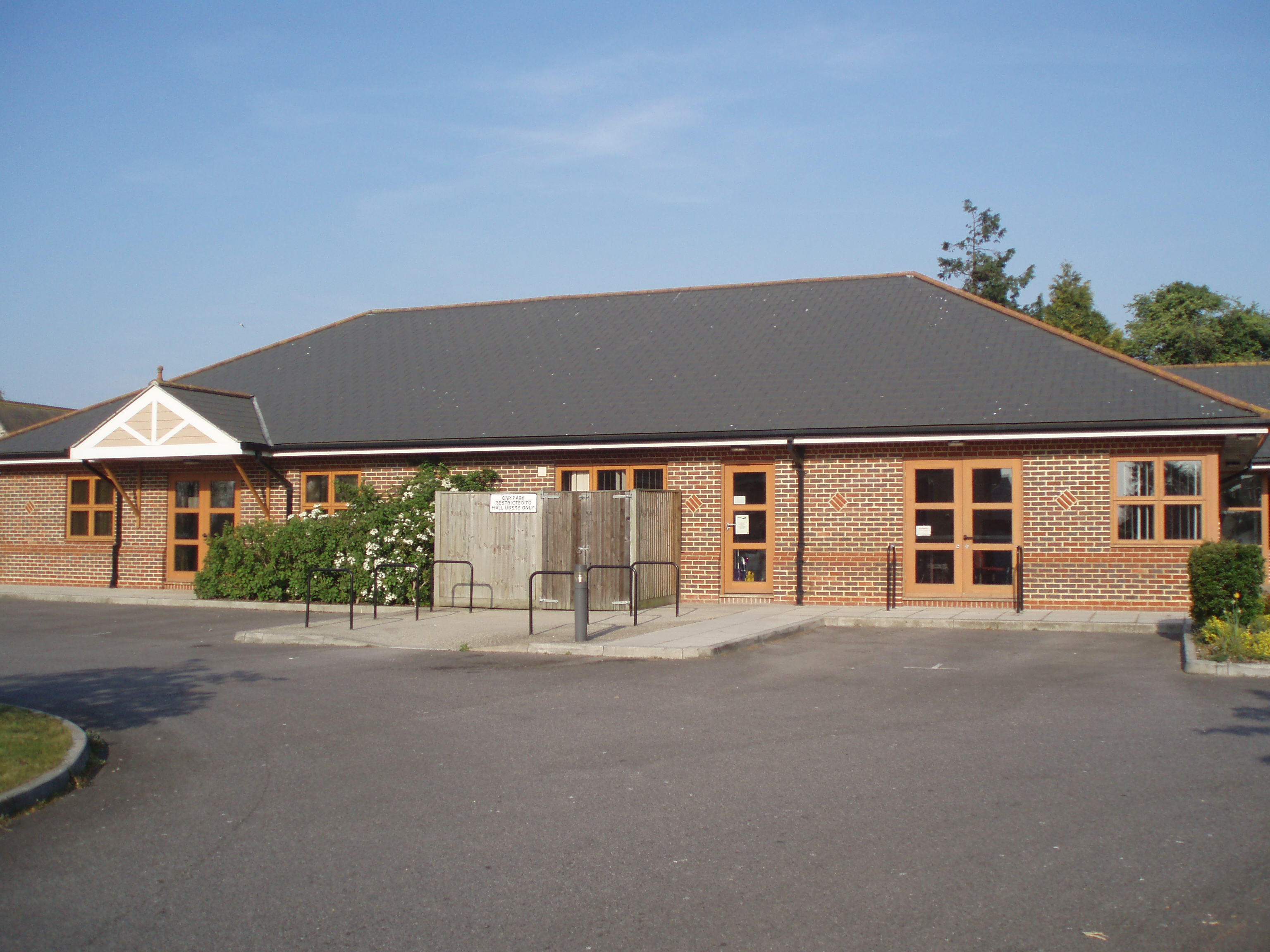
Bedhampton Social Hall, United Kingdom

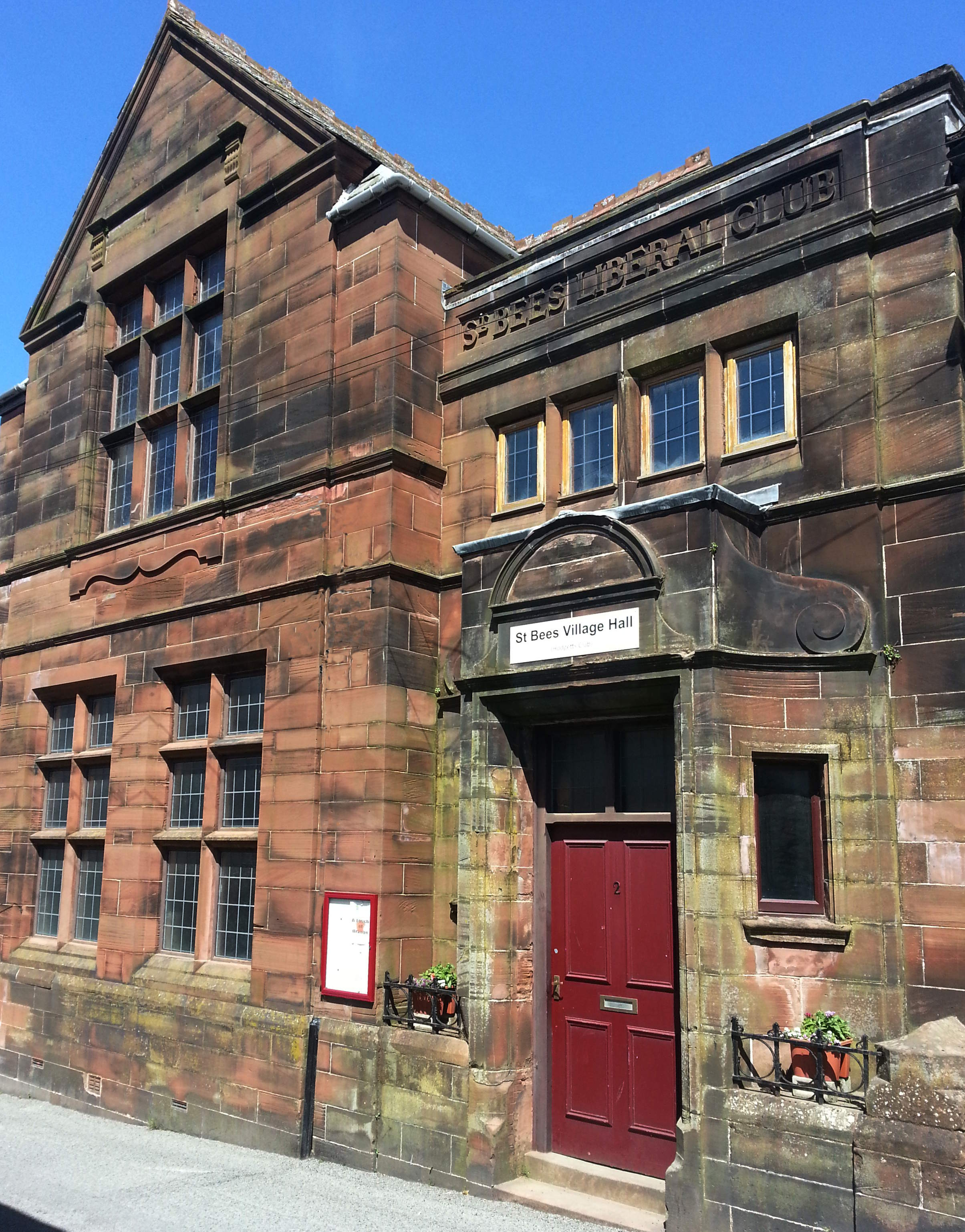
St Bees Village Hall Cumbria, UK. Built 1882.

In the United Kingdom, a village hall is a building which is owned by a local government council or independent trustees, and is run for the benefit of the local community. It is estimated that there are over 10,000 such village halls. Most were built in the first decade after World War I (1919-1929) as part of a programme led by the newly-formed National Council of Social Service.

Such a hall is typically used for a variety of public and private functions, such as:

- Parish council meetings
- Polling station for local and national elections
- Sports and exercise groups - badminton is typical
- Local drama productions
- Dances
- Jumble sales
- Private parties such as birthdays or wedding receptions

Village halls are generally run by committees, and if not already part of a local government body such as a parish council, then such committees are eligible for charitable status. They may have other names such as a Village Institute or Memorial Hall. In some localities a church hall or community centre provides similar functions.

Typically the hall will contain at least one large room, which may have a stage at one end for drama productions. There is often a kitchen for preparing food and toilets to one side. Larger halls may incorporate further smaller rooms to allow multiple simultaneous activities.

=== Wales ===
The word neuadd (IPA: /'neiæð/) is used to refer to village halls in Welsh-speaking parts of Wales, as in Neuadd Dyfi, the village hall in Aberdyfi.

== United States ==
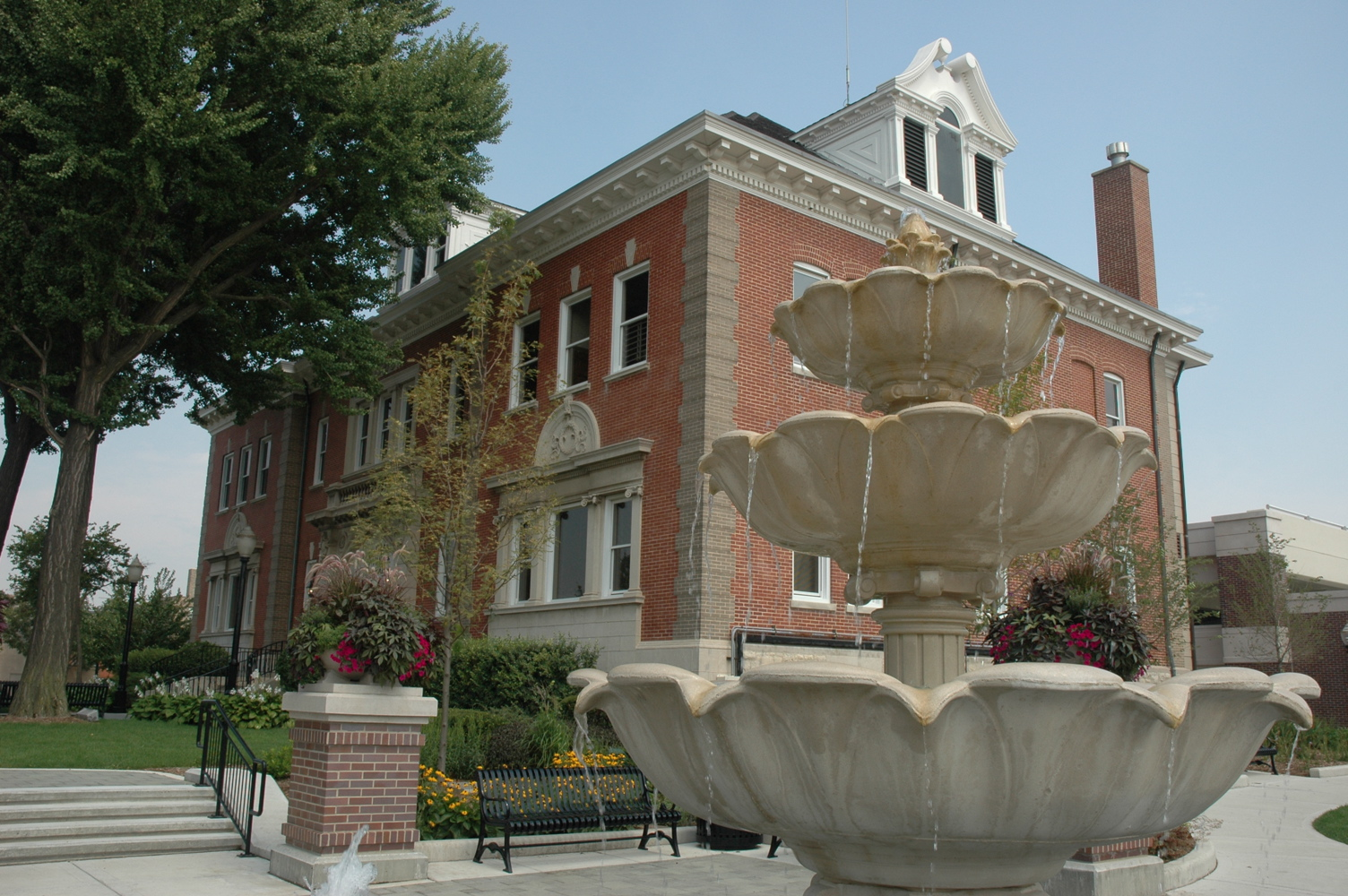
La Grange, Illinois Village Hall

In the United States, a village hall is the seat of government for villages. It functions much as a town hall or city hall.

== See also ==
- Church hall
- Community centre
- Function hall
- Local community
- Meeting house
- Moot hall
- Village Hall (TV series)
