= Moot hall =

British meeting or assembly building for local issues

A moot hall is a meeting or assembly building, traditionally to decide local issues.

In Anglo-Saxon England, a low ring-shaped earthwork served as a moot hill or moot mound, where the elders of the hundred would meet to take decisions. Some of these acquired permanent buildings, known as moot halls.

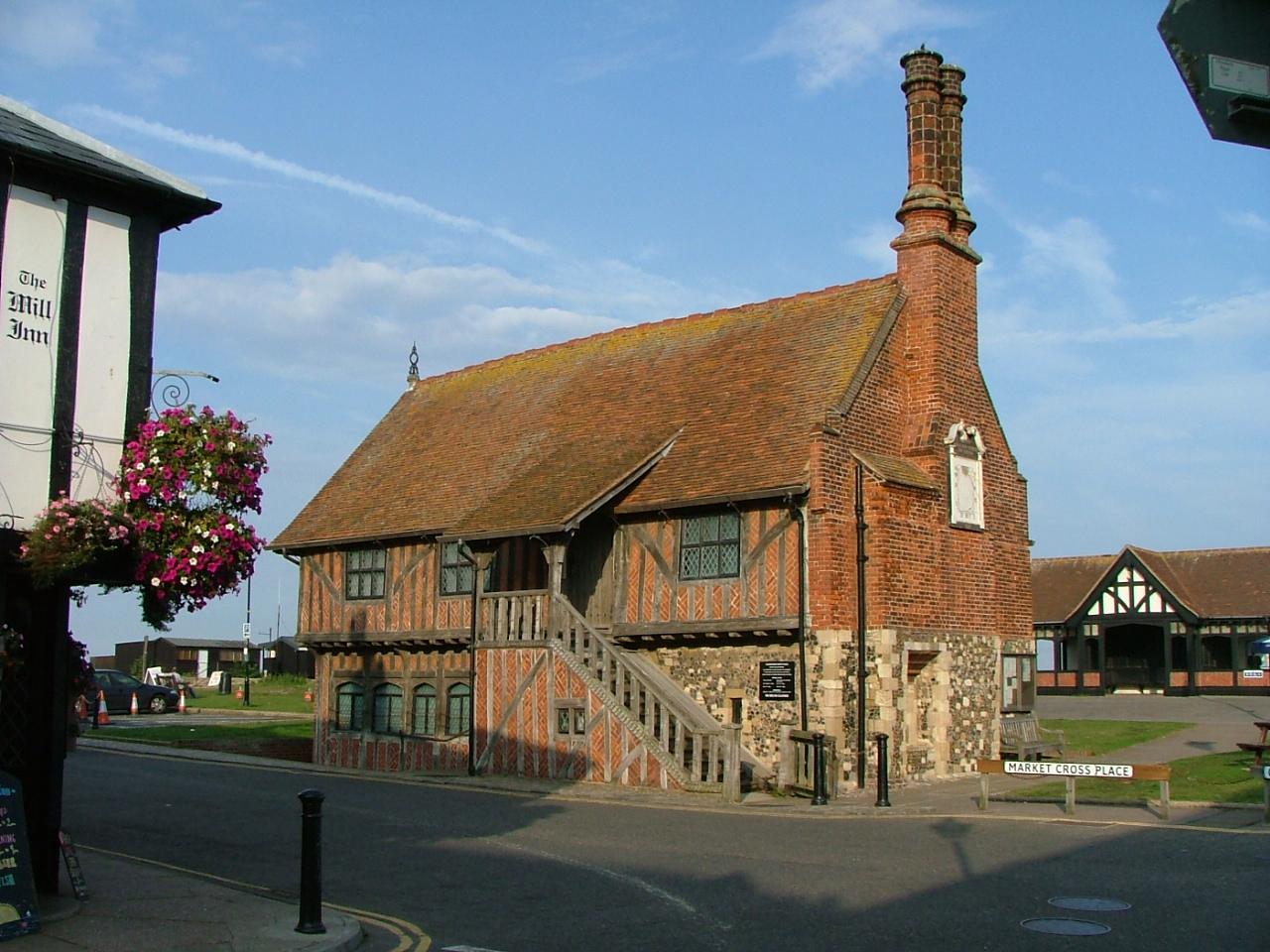
Moot Hall, Aldeburgh, Suffolk

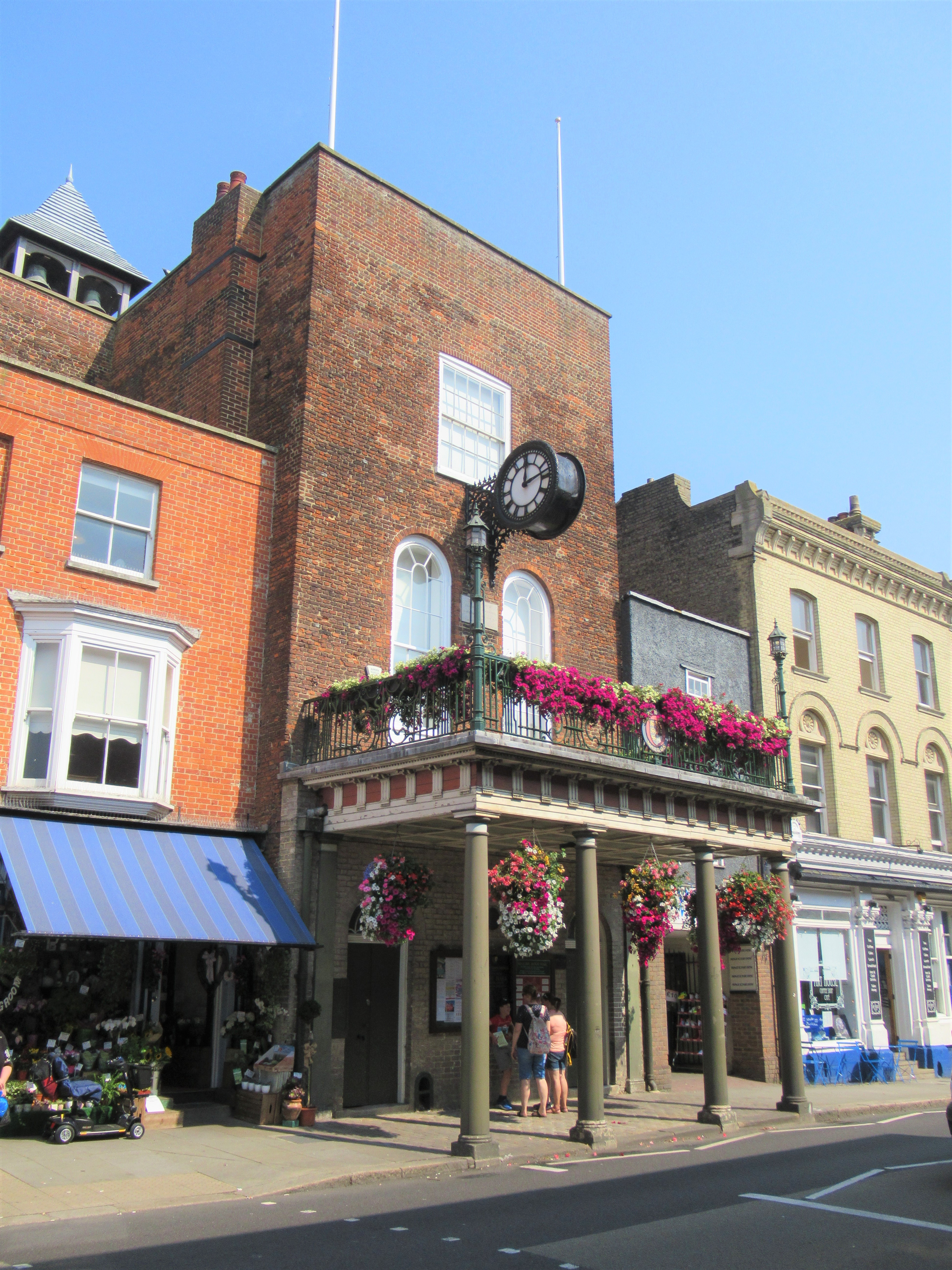
Moot Hall, Maldon, Essex

Surviving moot halls include:

- Moot Hall, Aldeburgh
- Moot Hall, Appleby
- Moot Hall, Brampton
- Moot Hall, Daventry
- Moot Hall, Elstow
- Moot Hall, Hexham
- Moot Hall, Holton le Moor
- Moot Hall, Keswick
- Moot Hall, Newcastle upon Tyne
- Moot Hall, Newark-on-Trent
- Moot Hall, Maldon
- Moot Hall, Mansfield
- Moot Hall, St Albans
- Moot Hall, Steeple Bumpstead
- Moot Hall, Wirksworth

Former moot halls include:

- St Mildred's Church, Ipswich

== See also ==
- Kgotla
- Mead hall
- Meeting house
- Thing (assembly)
- Witenagemot
