= Howsham railway station =

Howsham railway station can refer to:

- Howsham railway station (Lincolnshire)
- Howsham railway station (North Yorkshire)
