= Holton le Moor =

Village in Lincolnshire, England

Coordinates: 53.466063°N 0.373026°W

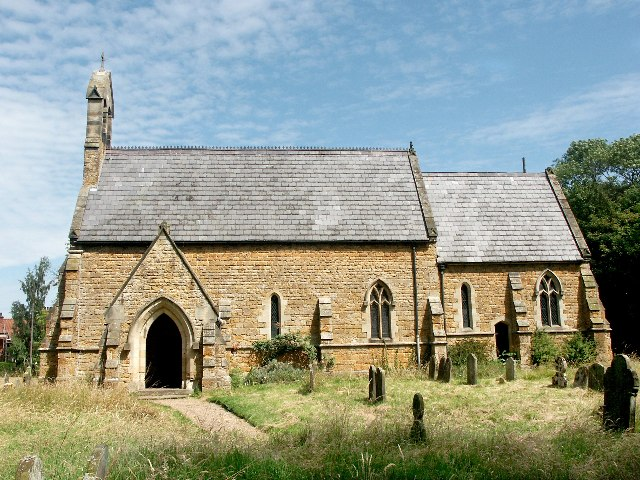
- St Luke's Church, Holton le Moor

- Location within Lincolnshire
- OS grid reference: TF080979
  - London: 135 mi (217 km) S
- District: West Lindsey
- Shire county: Lincolnshire
- Region: East Midlands
- Country: England
- Sovereign state: United Kingdom
- Post town: MARKET RASEN
- Postcode district: LN7
- Dialling code: 01673
- Police: Lincolnshire
- Fire: Lincolnshire
- Ambulance: East Midlands
- UK Parliament: Gainsborough

Holton le Moor is a small village and civil parish in the West Lindsey district of Lincolnshire, England.

Holton le Moor lies on the B1434 road. The nearest towns are Market Rasen 6 miles (10 km) to the south and Caistor 3 miles (5 km) to the north-east. It was formerly served by Holton Le Moor railway station.

In the Domesday account the village is written as "Hoctune". It was within the manor of Caistor in the then Lindsey North Riding, and prior to the Norman Conquest under the lordship of Earl Morcar. By 1086 the manor had fallen under the lordship of Ivo Taillebois and William I.

In 1885 Kelly's noted that the village was in the parish of Caistor, had an 1881 population of 178, and that chief agricultural production of the area was in wheat, barley, oats and turnips.

The Grade II listed Anglican church is dedicated to St Luke. It was re-built in 1854 by a George Place in Early English style, consisting of a chancel, nave, north aisle, and a bell turret with two bells. It was again partly rebuilt in 1926 by H. G. Gamble. The earlier parts of the church are ironstone, the doorway Norman style, and the stoup 13th century. There are memorials to the Dixon family, Lords of the Manor, painted wall decoration in the south chapel and stained glass windows from 1893.

Holton Hall was built in 1785 for Thomas Dixon by a local builder, and is listed, as are the hall's stables. Other listed structures include a farmhouse, cottages and pigeoncote. In 1964 Pevsner noted the school to the west of the church, built in 1913 by H. G. Gamble, and described it as "Nice, friendly, symmetrical, with large windows, and a steep pediment, decorated with rose branches".

St Luke's infant and junior primary Church of England School was associated with the village church. It closed in August 2006. The oldest remaining structure in the village, the Moot Hall, was built in 1910.
