= Maldon =

Town in Essex, England

Coordinates: 51.7318°N 0.6758°E

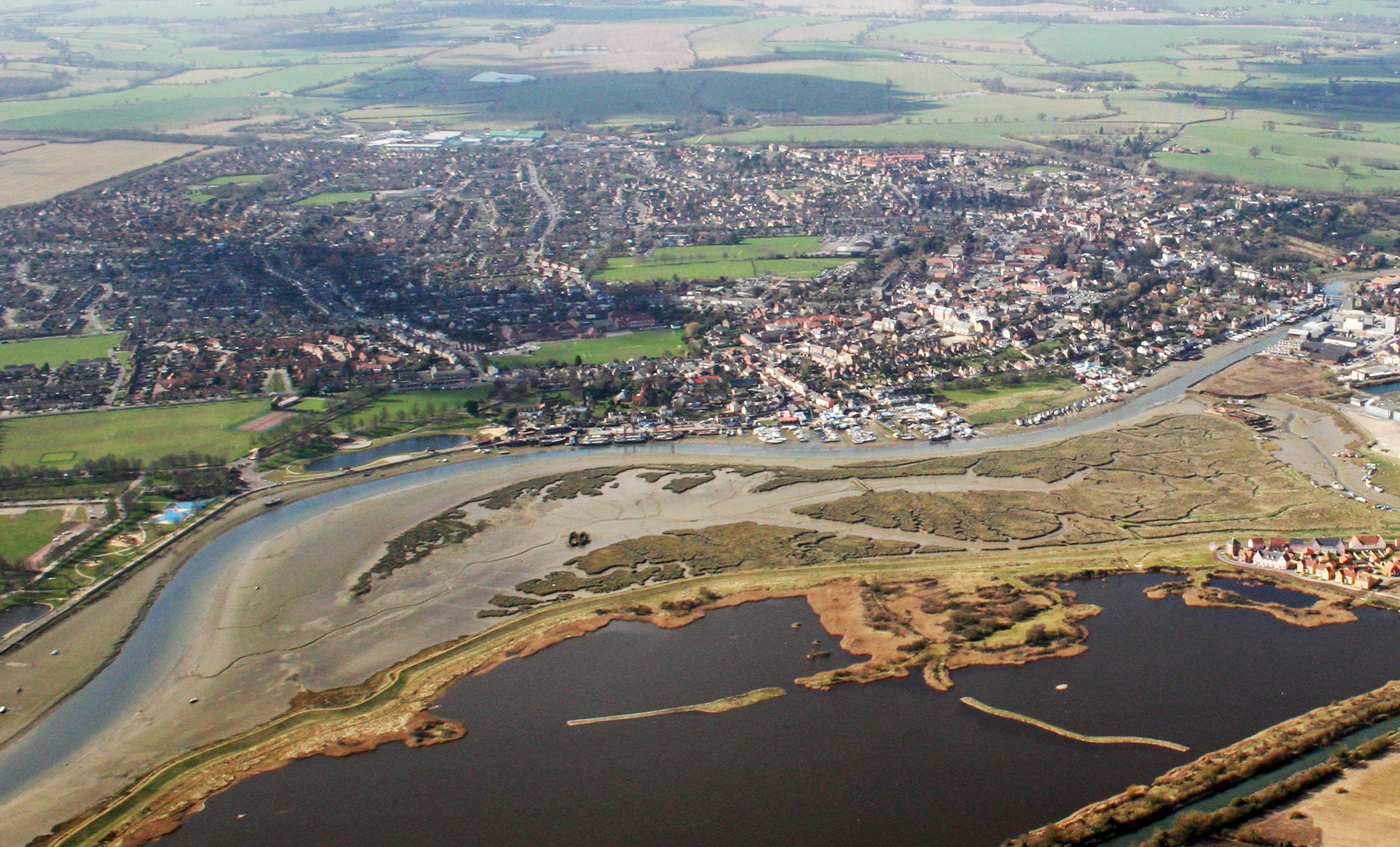
- Aerial view of Maldon from north east

- Location within Essex
- Population: 14,938 (Parish, 2021); 23,380 (Built up area, 2021)
- OS grid reference: TL848070
- Civil parish: Maldon
- District: Maldon
- Shire county: Essex
- Region: East
- Country: England
- Sovereign state: United Kingdom
- Post town: MALDON
- Postcode district: CM9
- Dialling code: 01621
- Police: Essex
- Fire: Essex
- Ambulance: East of England
- UK Parliament: Maldon

Maldon (/ˈmɔːldən/, locally /ˈmɒldən/) is a town and civil parish on the Blackwater Estuary in Essex, England. It is the seat of the Maldon District and starting point of the Chelmer and Blackwater Navigation. It is known for Maldon Sea Salt which is produced in the area. At the 2021 census, the parish had a population of 14,938, and the Maldon built-up area as defined by the Office for National Statistics, which extends beyond the parish boundary to also take in Heybridge to the north, had a population of 23,380.

== History ==
=== Early and medieval history ===
The place-name Maldon is first attested in 913 in the Anglo-Saxon Chronicle, where it appears as Maeldun. Maldon's name comes from mǣl, meaning 'monument or cross', and dūn meaning 'hill', so translates as 'monument hill'. East Saxons settled the area in the 5th century and the area to the south is still known as the Dengie Peninsula after the Dæningas. It became a significant Saxon port with a hythe or quayside and artisan quarters. Recent scholarship has linked it to Haegelisdun, the site of the death of Edmund the Martyr at the hands of the Great Heathen Army.

Evidence of imported pottery from this period has been found in archaeological digs. From 958 there was a royal mint issuing coins for the late Anglo-Saxon and early Norman kings.

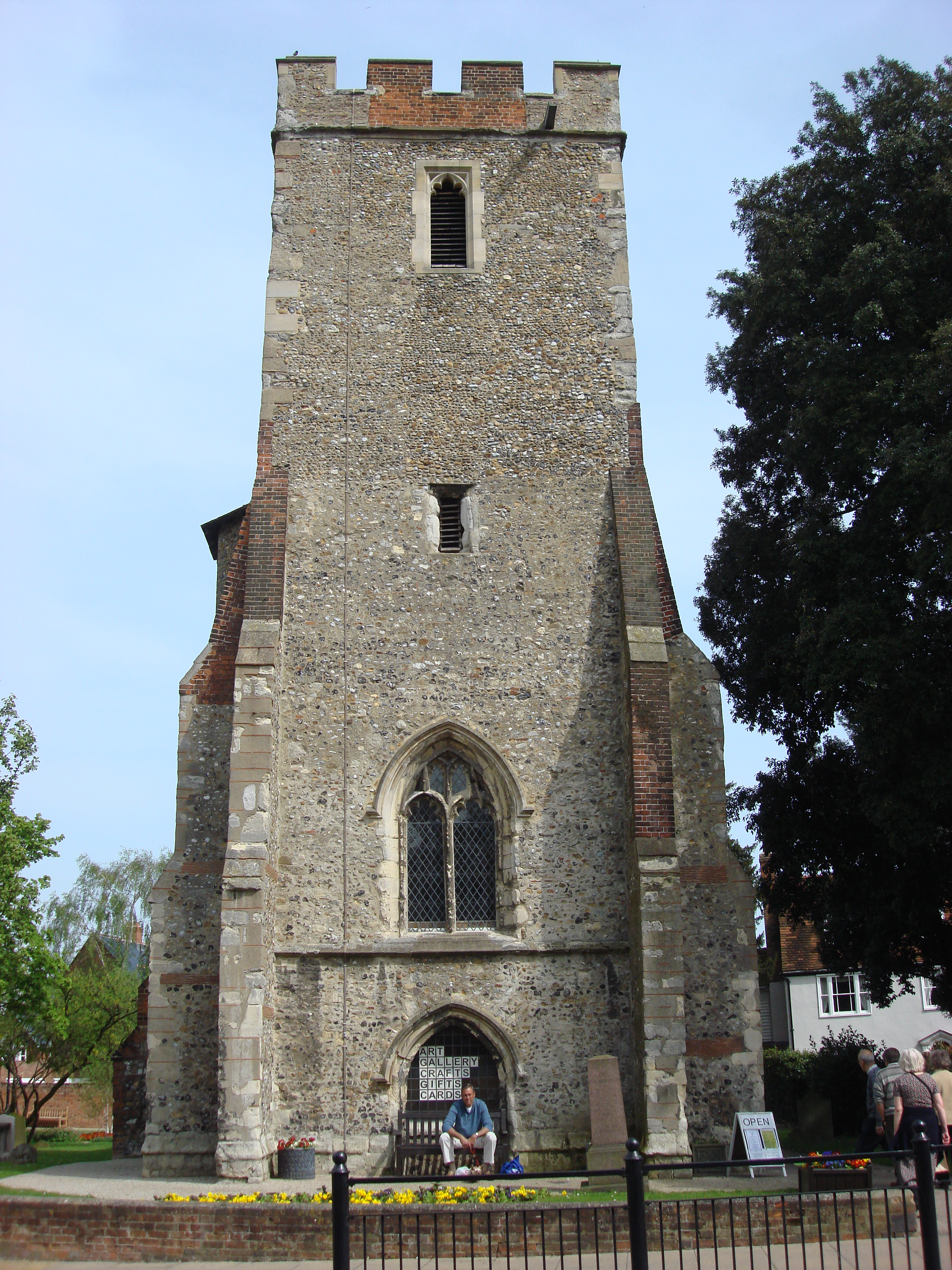
Tower of St Peter's Church

It was one of the only two towns in Essex (Colchester was the other), and King Edward the Elder is thought to have lived here while combating the Danish settlers who had overrun North Essex and parts of East Anglia. A Viking raid was beaten off in 924, but in another raid in 991 the defenders were defeated in the Battle of Maldon and the Vikings received tribute but apparently did not attempt to sack the town. It became the subject of the celebrated Old English poem "The Battle of Maldon". The battle is commemorated by a window in St Mary's Church and by a statue at the end of the Maldon Promenade Walk (facing the battle site of Northey Island and the Causeway) of the slain Saxon warrior Byrhtnoth.

According to the Domesday Book of 1086, there were 54 households and an estimated 180 townsmen in 1086. The town still had the mint and supplied a warhorse and warship for the king's service in return for its privileges of self-government. The town was awarded a charter by Henry II in 1171, stating the rights of the town as well as defining its borders and detailing its duty to provide a ship for the monarch "when necessary". The town's All Saints' Church, unique in England in having a triangular tower, dates from around this period. While the precise building date is unknown, the church existed by 1180, the date of the foundation of nearby Beeleigh Abbey. A Charter of Richard I of December 1189 confirms "certain grants to Beeleigh Abbey, including the Church of Blessed Peter in Maldon and the Church of All Saints' in the same town". St Mary's Church, on the Hythe Quay has a grade I listed Norman nave from 1130, though evidence exists of an earlier church on the site from at least a hundred years before. The hotel and public house now called The Blue Boar Hotel dates back to the latter half of the 14th century, having been built by the de Veres family headed by the Earl of Oxford and used as an occasional residence supplementary to their main seat, Hedingham Castle. Meanwhile, Maldon Moot Hall dates back to around 1420.

Maldon’s municipal administration of the River Blackwater estuary is defined by a series of historical civic charters and regulatory adaptations. While some early 20th-century municipal publications reference a traditional timeline originating from a charter of 7 October 1155, modern archival consensus identifies the earliest surviving royal grant as the Pembroke Charter, issued by King Henry II on 7 October 1171.

The 1171 text defines the borough's landward boundaries and establishes its custom duties and ship-service obligations, but contains no explicit provisions regarding exclusive fishery rights or riverbed ownership. Following the restrictions established under the Magna Carta in 1215 regarding the creation of private tidal fisheries, subsequent royal grants modified the borough's role; the 1555 Charter of Philip and Mary formally established the office of Water Bailiff to oversee local maritime policing, conservation enforcement, and Admiralty court jurisdictions rather than transferring proprietary freehold title of the watercourse. Following the suspension of the corporation's active functions between 1768 and 1810, the New Charter of 1810 re-established the borough’s civic framework, confirming its traditional regulatory and policing powers over specified sectors of the river highway.

=== Renaissance and modern eras ===
There were strong urban traditions, with two members elected to the Commons and three guilds which hosted lavish religious plays until they were suppressed by Puritans in 1576. Then, until 1630, professional actors were invited to perform plays, which were also stopped by Puritans. From 1570 to about 1800 a rival tradition of inviting prominent clergy to visit the town also existed. In 1629 a series of grain riots took place, led by the wife of a local butcher.

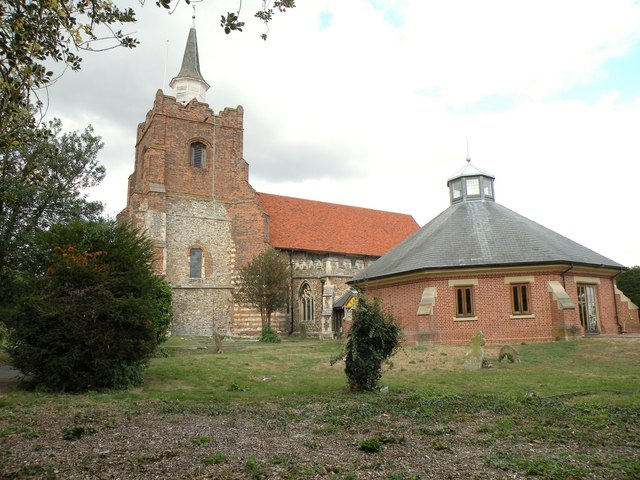
St. Mary's Church

In the 17th century Thomas Plume started the Plume Library to house over 8,000 books and pamphlets printed between 1487 and his death in 1704; the collection has been added to at various times since 1704. The Plume Library is to be found at St Peter's Church. Only the original tower survives, the rest of the building having been rebuilt by Thomas Plume to house his library (on the first floor) and what was Maldon Grammar School (on the ground floor). The ground floor is now the Maeldune Heritage Centre.

In the church of All Saints is a memorial window to George Washington, whose great-great grandfather, Lawrence Washington, is buried here. Unveiled by an American diplomat on 5 July 1928, the window displays Saint Nicholas with the Mayflower, Saint George and Saint Joan of Arc in the centre. At the top are the arms of the Washington family, and the arms of the USA, England, Scotland and Wales. At the bottom are depictions of George Washington, the landing of the Mayflower, the signing of the Declaration of Independence and the Statue of Liberty.

Also in Maldon are Maldon Baptist Church in Butt Lane, Maldon Methodist Church in the High Street, and Maldon United Reformed Church on Market Hill. Maldon Mosque is in Church Street.

During World War II, Maldon was featured in the German invasion plan for Britain, Operation Sea Lion. The plan called for the Germans to advance to a line between Maldon and the River Severn after they had landed in the southern coast of England.

=== The Maldon Embroidery ===
To commemorate the 1,000th anniversary of the Battle of Maldon, 86 local women completed a 42-foot embroidery. Designed by artist Humphrey Spender, the seven panels tell the story of the famous battle and also illustrate other notable moments in Maldon’s history, ending with the Embroidery’s unveiling in 1991. It is on display at the Maeldune Heritage Centre.

== Geography and geology ==
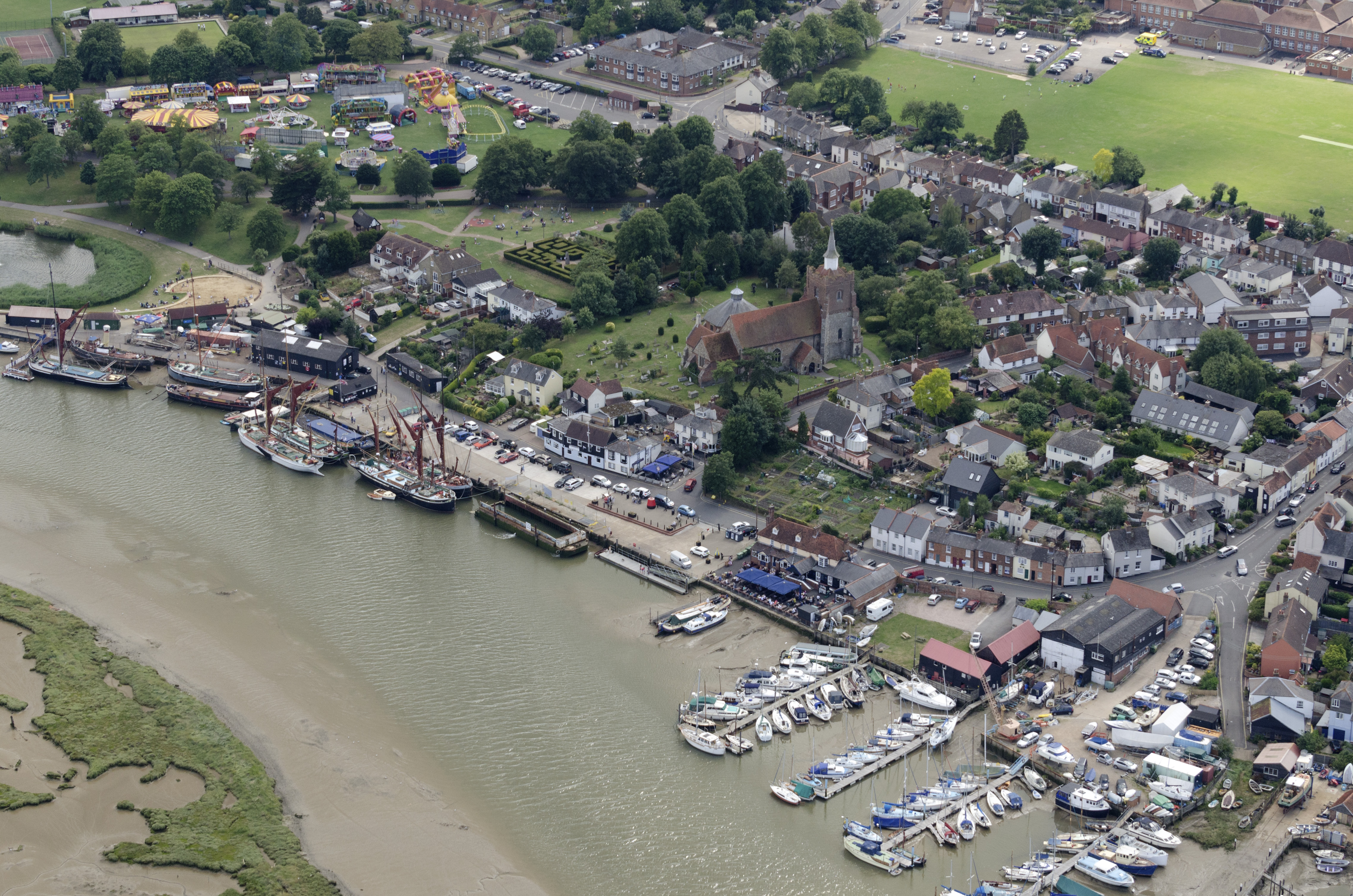
Maldon waterfront on the River Blackwater

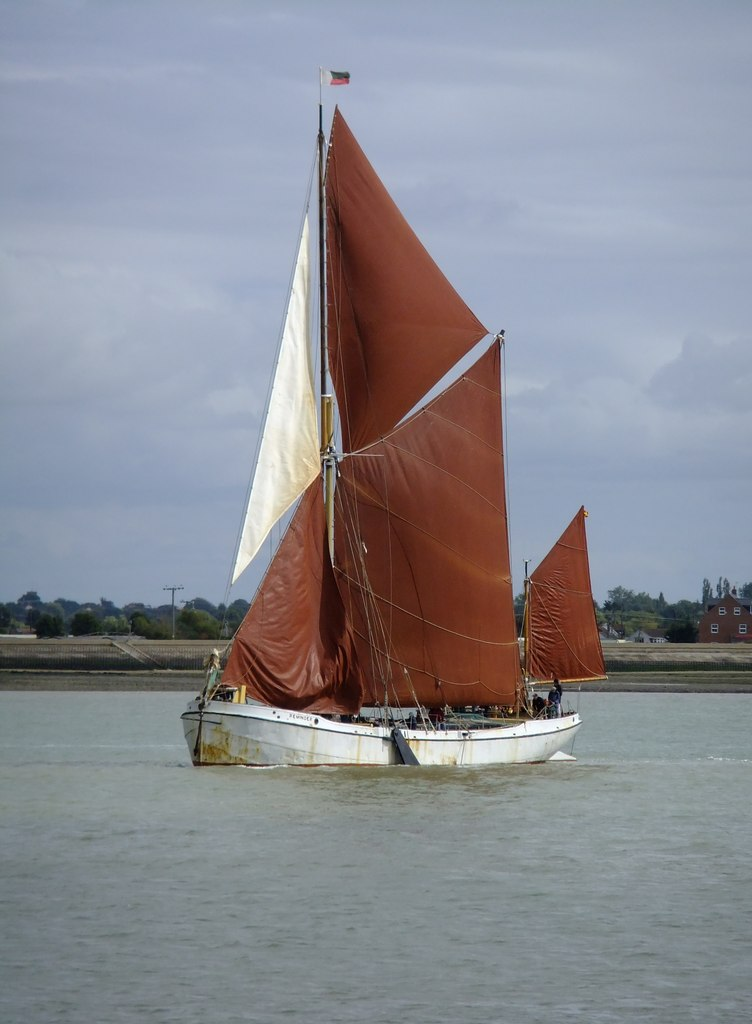
Maldon is known for its many Thames sailing barges

Maldon is on the tidal River Chelmer by the Blackwater Estuary. It is on the A414 10 miles (16 km) east of Chelmsford and 49 miles (79 km) north-east of Charing Cross, London, via the A13 road.

Essex is a county built on London Clay, overlain with pockets of gravel deposited by riparian action; the lowest land is made up of river alluvium and salt marsh. At Maldon, the railway cutting (now a road cutting) provided a reference section for geologists. There are three landslips on the north-facing river cliff of the Blackwater at Maldon. The middle slip is called the West Maldon Landslip, which was caused by repeated rotational slips of the bedrock London Clay, which is trying to reach a stable angle.

Hythe Quay at the confluence of the Chelmer and Blackwater, which flanks the northern edge of the town, was an important port. Both Hythe Quay and Cooks Yard are home to a large number of Thames barges, sailing vessels which attract many visitors.

The River Blackwater, that was diverted into the Chelmer and Blackwater Navigation, re-emerges into the Blackwater Estuary, through locks at the Heybridge Basin, the stream bed passes down Heybridge Creek. Here it delineates the border between Maldon Town and Heybridge Parish Council.

== Governance ==
There are three tiers of local government covering Maldon, at parish (town), district, and county level: Maldon Town Council, Maldon District Council, and Essex County Council. The town council is based at the Town Hall on Market Hill, which was built in 1998.

=== Administrative history ===
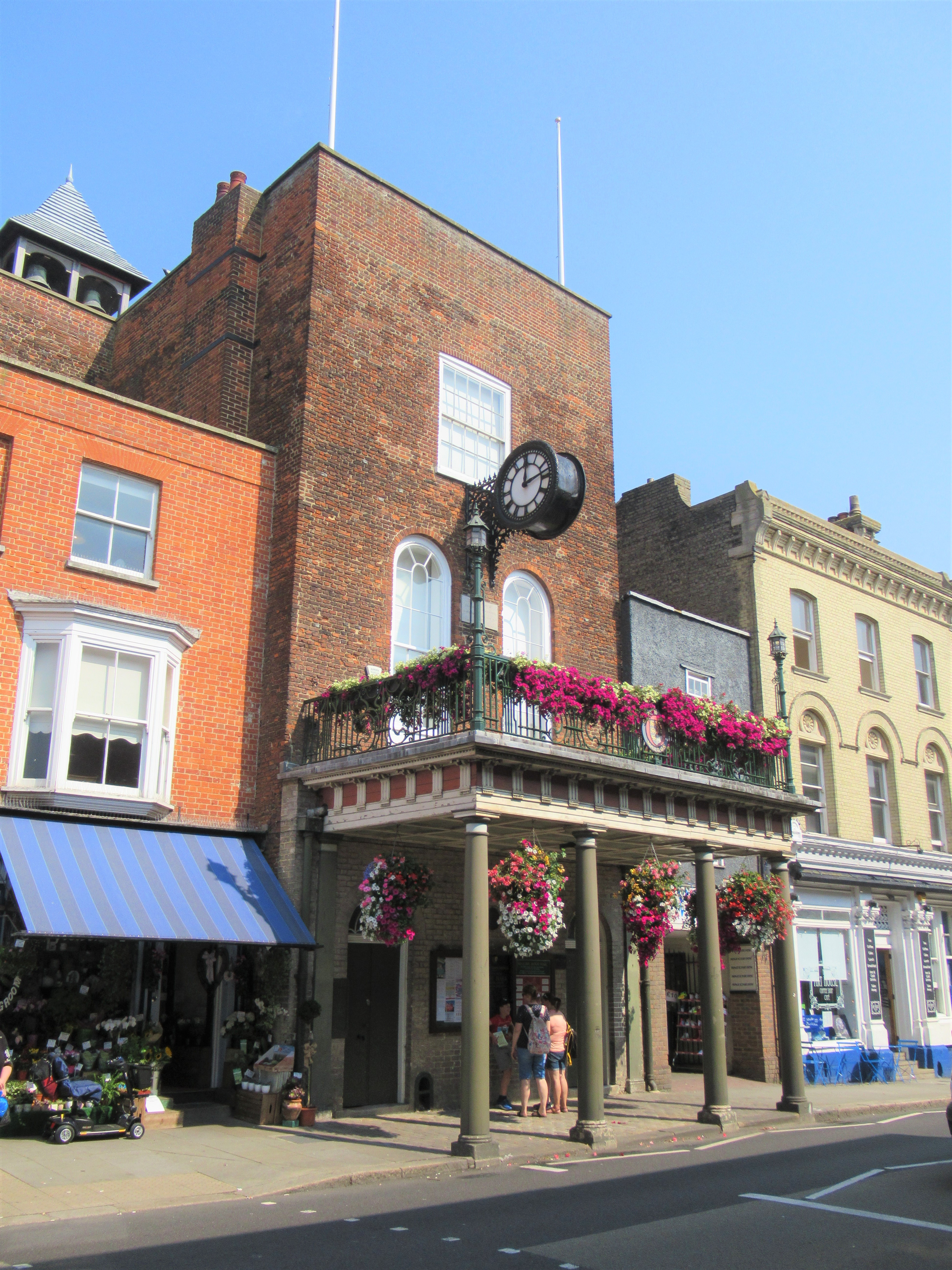
Maldon Moot Hall on the High Street

Maldon was an ancient borough. Its date of becoming a borough is not known. It had burgesses listed in the Domesday Book of 1086, indicating that it was already a borough by then. Maldon's earliest known municipal charters date from the 12th century; some sources say the first charter was granted in 1171, others say there was an earlier charter of 1155. From 1332 the borough also served as a constituency for parliamentary elections as the Maldon parliamentary borough, electing two members of parliament.

The borough was run by a corporation, also known as the town council or borough council. In 1576 the corporation bought a 15th-century house at 39 High Street and converted it into the Moot Hall, serving as the corporation's meeting place and offices.

The corporation's functions included running the parliamentary elections. In 1768 most of the corporation's members were removed from office following legal action taken by the town's former MP, Bamber Gascoyne, who had lost his seat at the 1763 election. The removed members were not replaced, and so the corporation ceased operating. For the next 42 years the remaining freemen of the borough ran the borough's parliamentary elections, but no corporation existed to exercise local functions. The borough was eventually awarded a new charter in 1810, allowing the corporation to be re-established. The borough covered the combined area of the three parishes of St Mary's, St Peter's and All Saints'. As well as the town itself, the borough boundaries also included extensive parts of the Blackwater Estuary.

The borough was reformed to become a municipal borough in 1836 under the Municipal Corporations Act 1835, which standardised how most boroughs operated across the country. The borough was enlarged in 1934 to take in Heybridge to the north of the river, which had formerly been a separate parish, and Osea Island from the parish of Great Totham, alongside several other more minor adjustments to the boundaries with neighbouring parishes. At the same time, the urban parishes within the borough were united into a single parish of Maldon matching the enlarged borough.

The borough of Maldon was abolished in 1974, being replaced by the larger Maldon District which also covers extensive surrounding rural areas. The area of the former borough became unparished as a result of the 1974 reforms. Two new civil parishes were subsequently created in 1987 covering the area of the pre-1974 borough: Heybridge north of the River Blackwater and Maldon to the south of the river. The parish council for Maldon adopted the name Maldon Town Council.

Although now a separate parish again, Heybridge is classed as part of the Maldon built up area as defined by the Office for National Statistics.

== Transport ==
=== Rail ===
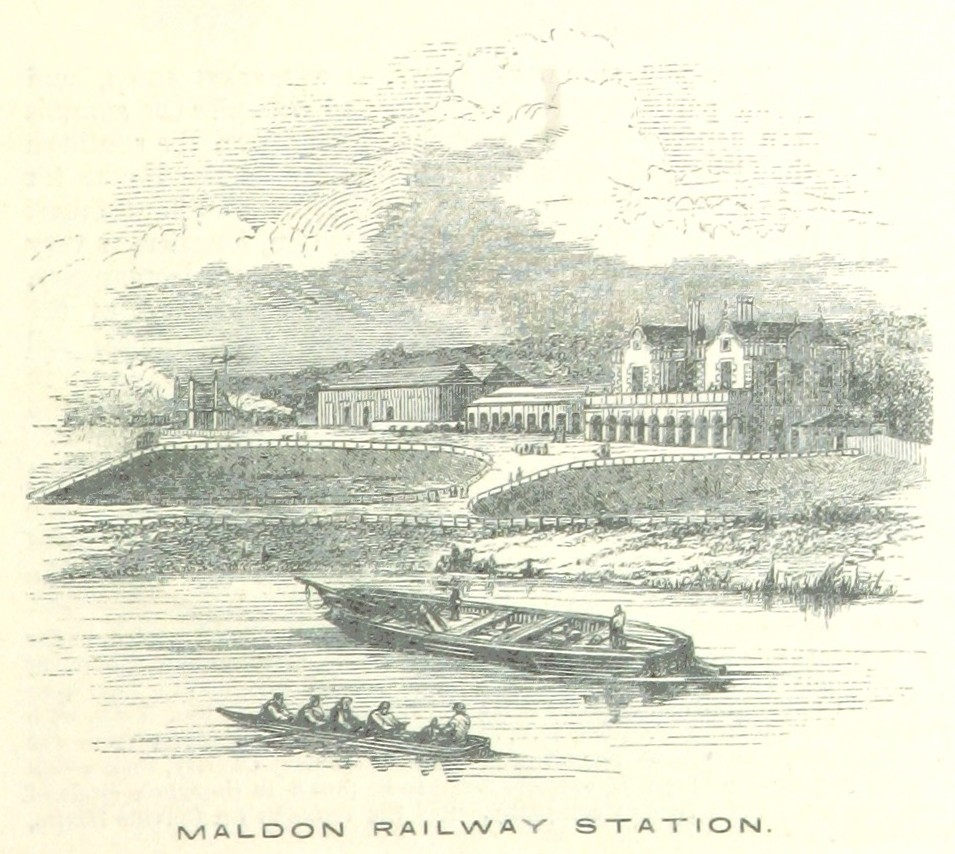
Maldon East railway station in 1851

Maldon was previously served by two railway lines. Today, the nearest railway stations to Maldon are Hatfield Peverel, Witham and North Fambridge. Hatfield Peverel is the closest railway station to the north of the town, whilst North Fambridge is closest to southern parts of the town.

Maldon's first railway link was a branch line to Witham opened in 1846. Later, a second line linked Maldon with Woodham Ferrers on the Crouch Valley line between Southminster and Wickford. Whilst Wickford is itself on the line between Shenfield and Southend (thus providing Maldon with another route into London Liverpool Street), a short-lived spur line at Wickford also gave direct access towards Southend.

Edward Arthur Fitch, writing in about 1895, states that from London's Liverpool Street station to Maldon East via Witham there were eight trains on weekdays and three on Sundays and that, via Wickford, there were five trains on weekdays and none on Sundays. The fastest train took 85 minutes via Witham and 82 minutes via Wickford.

Maldon West railway station was opened in 1889 by the Great Eastern Railway. The line between Maldon and South Woodham Ferrers closed to passengers in 1939, the Maldon and Witham line closed in 1966.

=== Bus ===
Regular bus services in and around the town are operated primarily by First Essex and Hedingham; key routes include the 31 from Chelmsford, the 75 from Colchester and the 90 from Witham.

== Industry ==
Maldon Sea Salt has been produced in the town since 1882 by the Maldon Crystal Salt Company; it is also the location of the first Tesco store to be designated as a "supermarket" in the country, established in 1958.

Maldon's Hythe Quay is the residence of a number of Thames sailing barges, these are among the last cargo vessels in the world still operating under sail, albeit now used for education and leisure. Some ten to fifteen of the surviving fleet count Maldon as their home port, and many others are regular visitors alongside at the Quay. An annual sailing barge race ends with a parade of sail and prize-giving at the quay. Cooks Yard, where barges were once built, is still working at the end of Maldon Quay.

== Culture ==
The town holds the charitable Maldon mud race where competitors race across the Blackwater estuary at low tide, along the bank and back through the water. The race generated over £55,000 for charities in 2014. Maldon also hosts the international Maldon Festival, which takes place each year in late June and July.

The town holds an annual "Taxi Day" which sees mentally and physically disabled children from London driven to Maldon in London Black Cabs for a fun day of activities and a meal. The event dates back to 1952 when a London cab driver visited the Elizabeth Fry Special School (formerly Grange Road Special School) in Plaistow. He wanted to do something special for the young patients he saw there. He wrote to every one of Essex's seaside towns to arrange an outing and the only town that was willing to help was Maldon; thus, Taxi Day has remained a tradition ever since.

Maldon is twinned with the Dutch town of Cuijk. The charter between the two towns was signed in 1970 to cement the relationship.

=== Cultural references ===
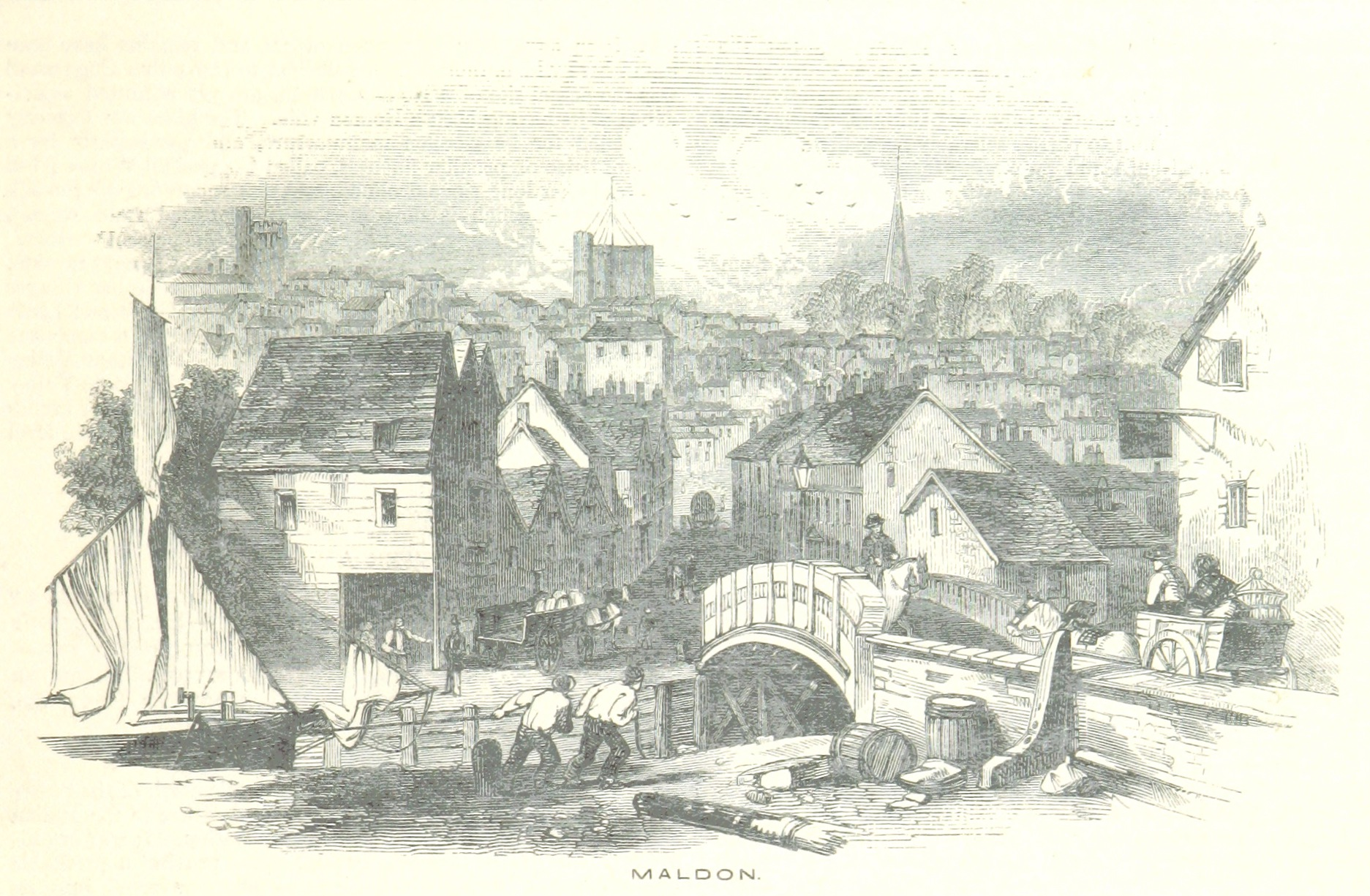
Maldon from The Eastern Counties Railway Illustrated Guide, 1851

Maldon and the surrounding area are the setting for a series of books by the prolific author Samuel L. Bensusan. Bensusan's stories recall a lost way of life among the towns and villages in the area, and along the local coastline and marshland. In Bensusan's books, Maldon is called Market Waldron.

Maldon has been the setting for numerous television productions, including Lawless Heart (2001) starring Bill Nighy, and BBC1's The Murder Game (2003) where numerous Blackwater Estuary locations were used including Green's Flour Mill at the bottom of Market Hill and Steeple Marshes. An episode of the TV series Lovejoy featuring Ian McShane was also filmed there.

In H. G. Wells' The War of the Worlds (1898); Maldon is the town from which the narrator's brother and two female companions manage to escape across the Channel.

Maldon is a location mentioned in "The Rose Garden", a short ghost story by M. R. James, and published in More Ghost Stories of an Antiquary (1911).

Maldon and its clock tower are featured in the young adult novel Timekeeper by Tara Sim (2016).

Maldon is the hometown of two Marvel Comics superheroes: Brian Braddock, the original Captain Britain, and his twin sister Betsy Braddock, longtime member of the X-Men as "Psylocke" and Brian's eventual successor as Captain Britain. It is also the home of their older brother, the X-Men villain Jamie Braddock. Many early Captain Britain stories took place within their fictional childhood manor in Maldon, first seen in Captain Britain #8 (1976).

=== Media ===
Local news and television programmes are provided by BBC East and ITV Anglia. Television signals are received from the Sudbury TV transmitter.

Local radio stations are BBC Essex on 103.5 FM, Heart East on 102.6 FM, Radio Essex on 107.7 FM, Greatest Hits Radio East on 100.2 FM, and Caroline Community Radio, a community based radio station that broadcast on 94.7 FM.

The town is served by the local newspaper, Maldon and Burnham Standard.

== Sport ==
Maldon has a non-League football club Maldon & Tiptree F.C. who play at the Drewitt-Barlow Stadium.

There are youth football teams in Maldon, among them being Maldon Saints. The town has a cricket club, with several adult and colts' sides, who play at two grounds: The Promenade Park, Maldon and the main ground at Drapers Farm, Heybridge. The ground includes a dual-lane enclosed all-weather net facility. Overseas players from Australia, South Africa and Sri Lanka have coached cricket in local primary schools as part of the "ECB Chance to Shine" programme. Drapers Farm is also the home of Maldon Rugby Union Football Club which was founded in 1947 by Tommy Harries, who was the landlord of the King's Head public house in Maldon High Street. The inaugural meeting was on 28 August 1947 at the Blue Boar Hotel. Maldon RFC run several senior male sides and one female side as well as all youth age groups from under 7s to under 18s.

Blackwater Leisure Centre is the town's main leisure destination, located in the town's leisure quarter, adjacent to Madison Heights, with a 4 lane 25m swimming pool, 100+ station gym, group cycling studio, group exercise studio and sports hall with indoor courts.

Two short-lived greyhound racing tracks existed at Sealey Farm on the Fambridge Road (opening on 3 September 1932 and closing the same year) and around the former Spital Road football ground in 1931. The racing was independent (not affiliated to the sports governing body the National Greyhound Racing Club) and they were known as flapping tracks, which was the nickname given to independent tracks.

== Notable people ==
Essex and England cricketer Sir Alastair Cook (born 1984) played for Maldon Cricket Club throughout his early years. Brought up in nearby Wickham Bishops, his brothers played for the club as well. Cook remains closely associated with the club, being an Honorary Life Member, while acting as a huge role model for the club's young players. Cook made his Essex debut in 2003, before making his international debut, aged 21, in 2006.

Singer/songwriter and TikTok star Sam Ryder, born 1989, represented the UK in the 2022 Eurovision Song Contest with his song "Space Man", where he came 2nd with 466 points.

Private David Embleton (1853–1912) won a Victoria Cross, in his army name of Frederick Corbett, in the Arabi Pasha Rebellion in Egypt on 5 August 1882. He was buried in an unmarked grave in London Road Cemetery, Maldon, but in 2004 the regimental association provided a memorial and in 2005 the Essex Society for Family History provided another. He served in the King's Royal Rifle Corps. Although awarded the VC for standing by a wounded officer, he subsequently forfeited his VC after committing theft against another officer in 1884.

Edward Bright (1721–1750) was the "fat man of Maldon", a grocer who, at 47.5 stone (665 lb; 302 kg) was reputed to be the fattest man in England. His coat could encompass seven men. After his death, etchings of a painting of him were much sought after. His chair resides in Maldon Moot Hall.

John Cook (1918–1984) was a prolific 20th-century Anglo-American composer, organist and church musician.

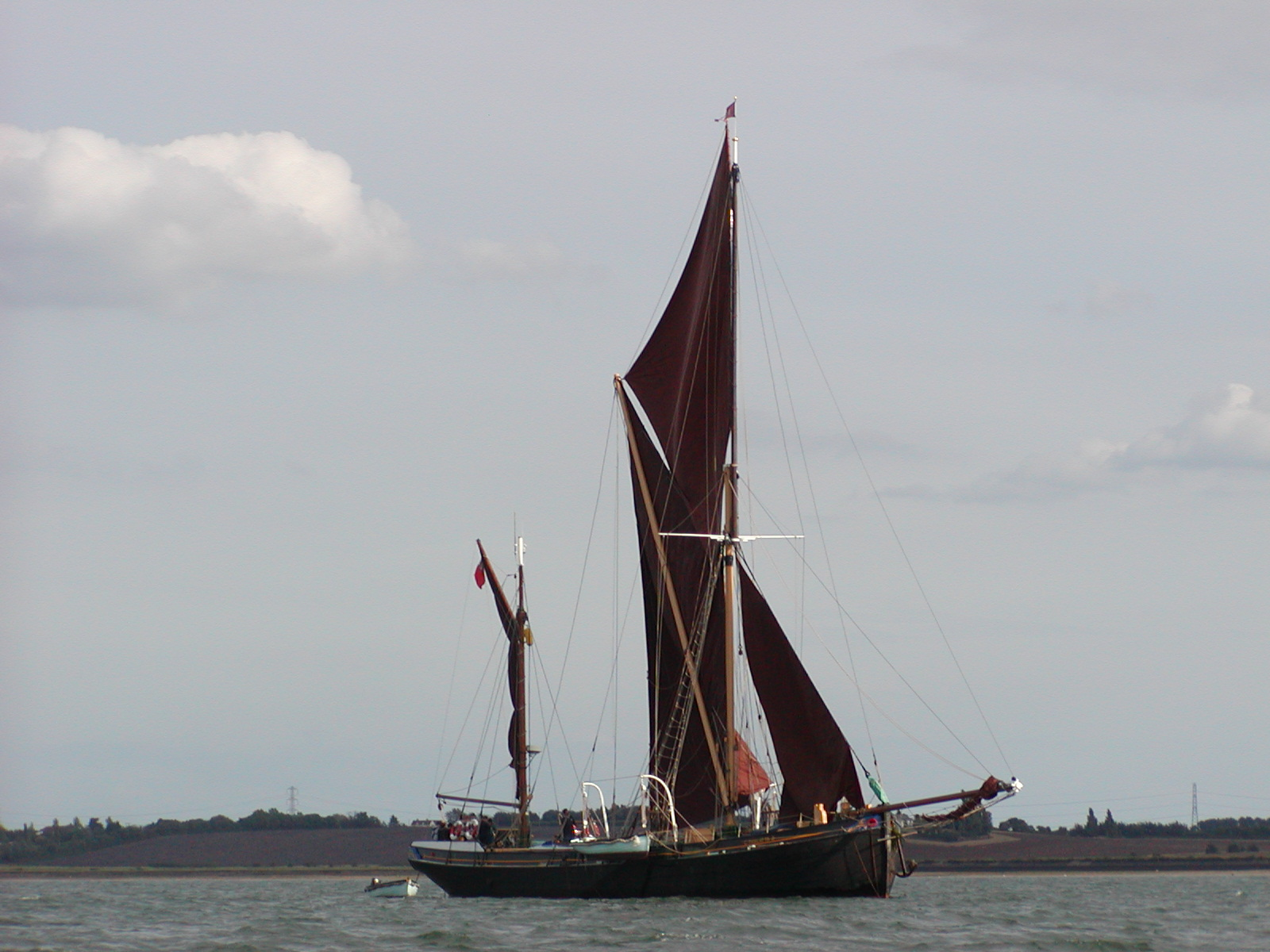
Sailing barge Thalatta, whose home port is Maldon, was built in 1906.

John Kemp (1926–1987): John Kemp's work on the preservation of Thames sailing barges in the 1960s was critical to re-establishing Maldon as the foremost sailing barge port in the country. John Kemp was responsible for the creation of the East Coast Sail Trust, a schoolship scheme for young people using the sailing barges Thalatta and Sir Alan Herbert, operated from Maldon. He was author of three books and chronicler of the Maldon and Essex coastal scenes and the unique character of the marshland folk, especially in the Maldon and Burnham Standard, Essex Chronicle and Essex County Standard newspapers.

Myra Sadd Brown (1872–1938), Suffragette, women's rights activist and internationalist was born in the town.

John Strutt (1842–1919) was a British mathematician who made extensive contributions to science. He was born in Langford Grove, Maldon, inherited the title Baron Rayleigh in 1873 and won the Nobel Prize in Physics in 1904, in part for discovering the inert gas argon.

Horatio Gates (1727–1806), the English general who fought for Britain in the French and Indian War and the rebel side in the War of American Independence, was born in Maldon.

Ethan Lawrence (born 28 September 1992) is an English actor, born in Maldon. He is known for playing the roles of Joe Poulter in the BBC series Bad Education and James in the Netflix black comedy series After Life.

Virginia Crosbie (born 8 December 1966), former Member of Parliament for Ynys Môn, was born in Maldon before attending school in Colchester.

== Twin towns ==
Maldon is twinned with:

- Villeparisis, Île-de-France, France
- Cuijk, North Brabant, Netherlands

== Gallery ==
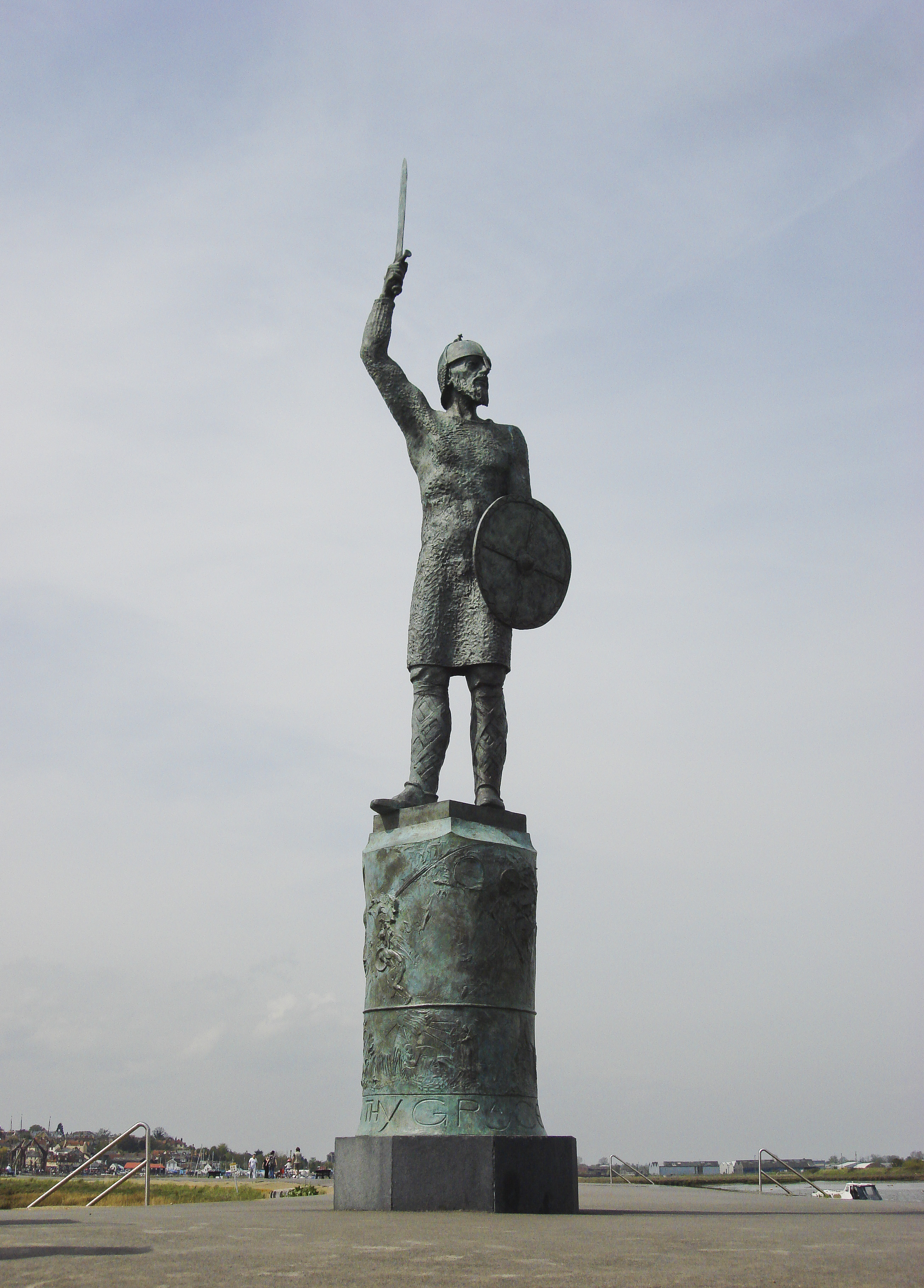
Byrhtnoth statue marking the Battle of Maldon in 991, in which Byrhtnoth died

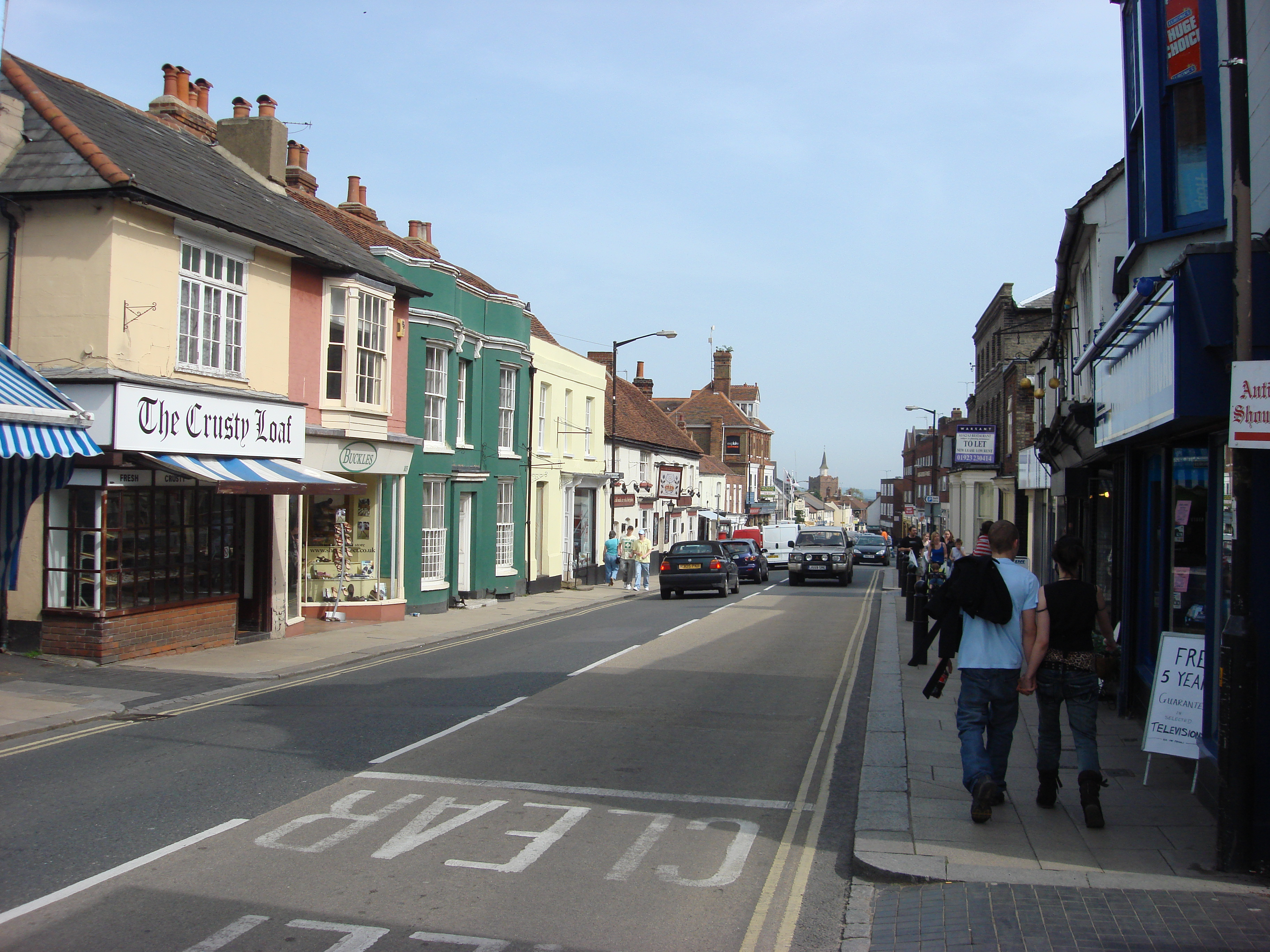
High Street

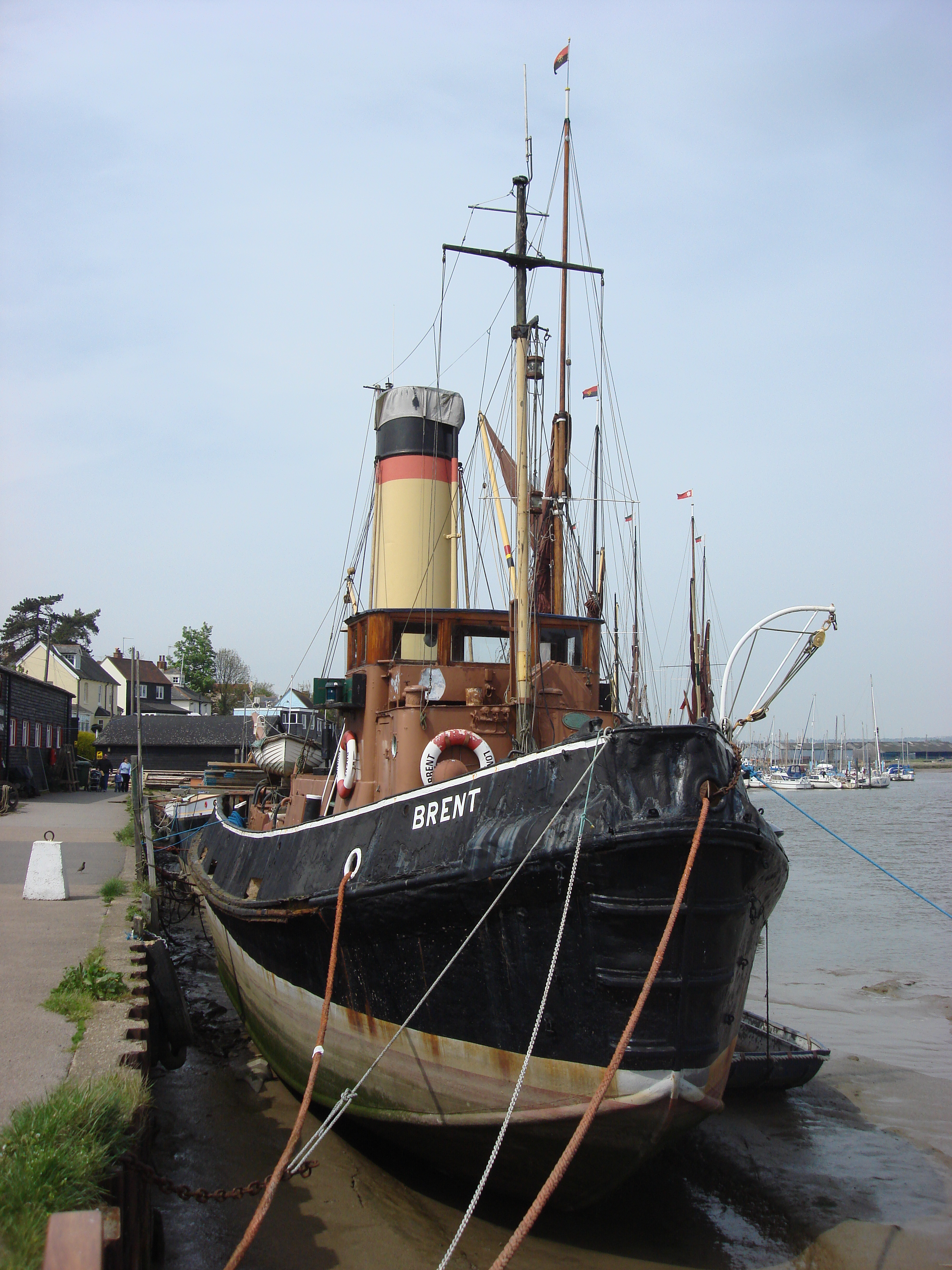
Tugboat Brent moored on the River Chelmer

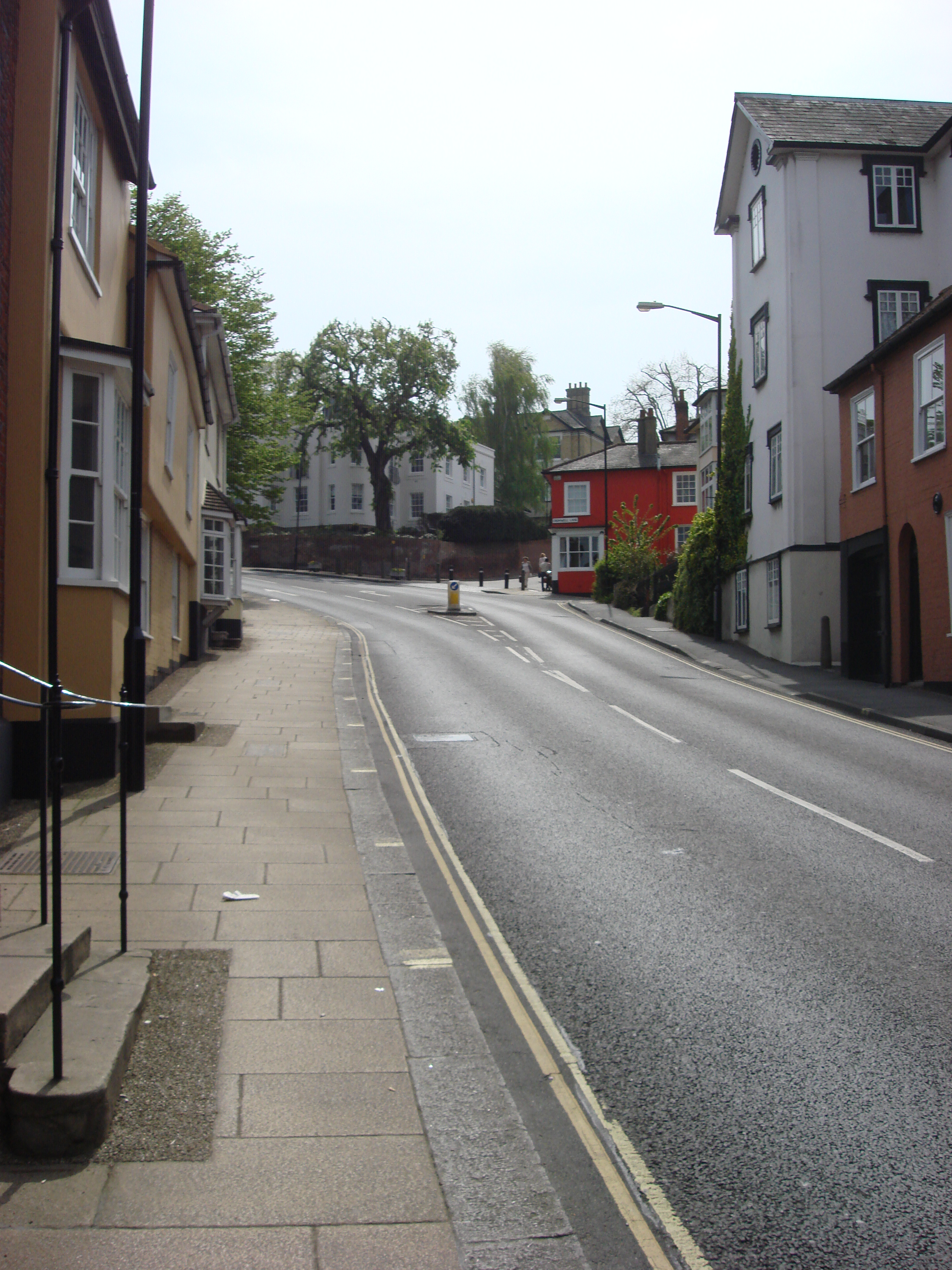
Market Hill

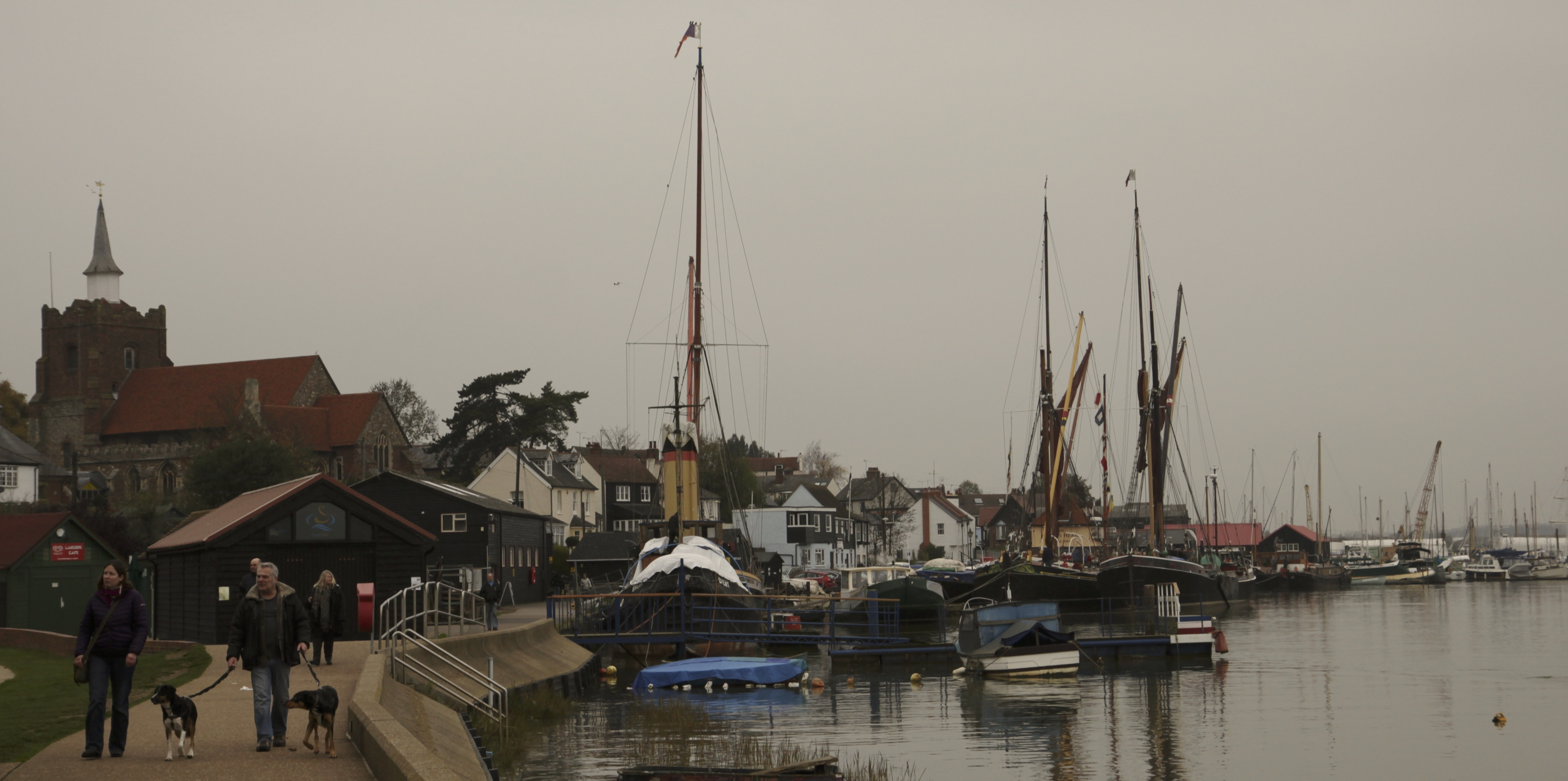
Promenade view north, with St Mary's Church at left

== Nearby places ==
- Beeleigh Abbey
- Brightlingsea
- Burnham-on-Crouch
- Chelmsford
- Danbury
- Great Totham
- Hazeleigh
- Heybridge
- Langford
- Little Totham
- Maylandsea
- Mundon
- North Fambridge
- South Woodham Ferrers
- Steeple
- Tiptree
- Tollesbury
- Tolleshunt Major
- Tolleshunt Knights
- Tillingham
- Cold Norton
- Witham
- Woodham Mortimer
- Woodham Walter

== See also ==
- Cooks Yard – barge building and repair yard on the River Chelmer at Maldon
- Plume School – secondary school in Maldon
