= Moortown railway station =

Former railway station in Lincolnshire, England

Coordinates: 53.4824°N 0.3752°W

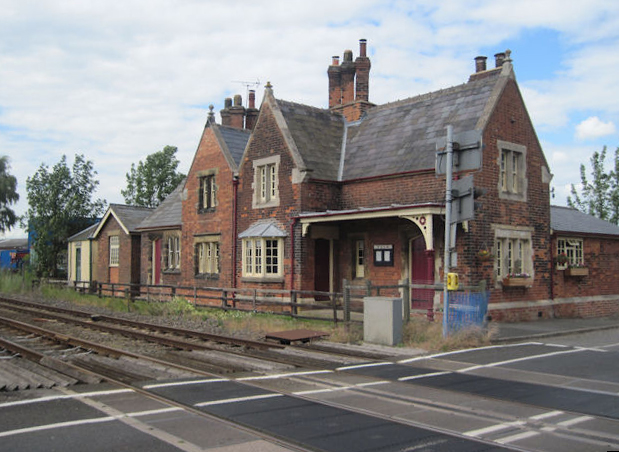
Former station building, now a bed and breakfast

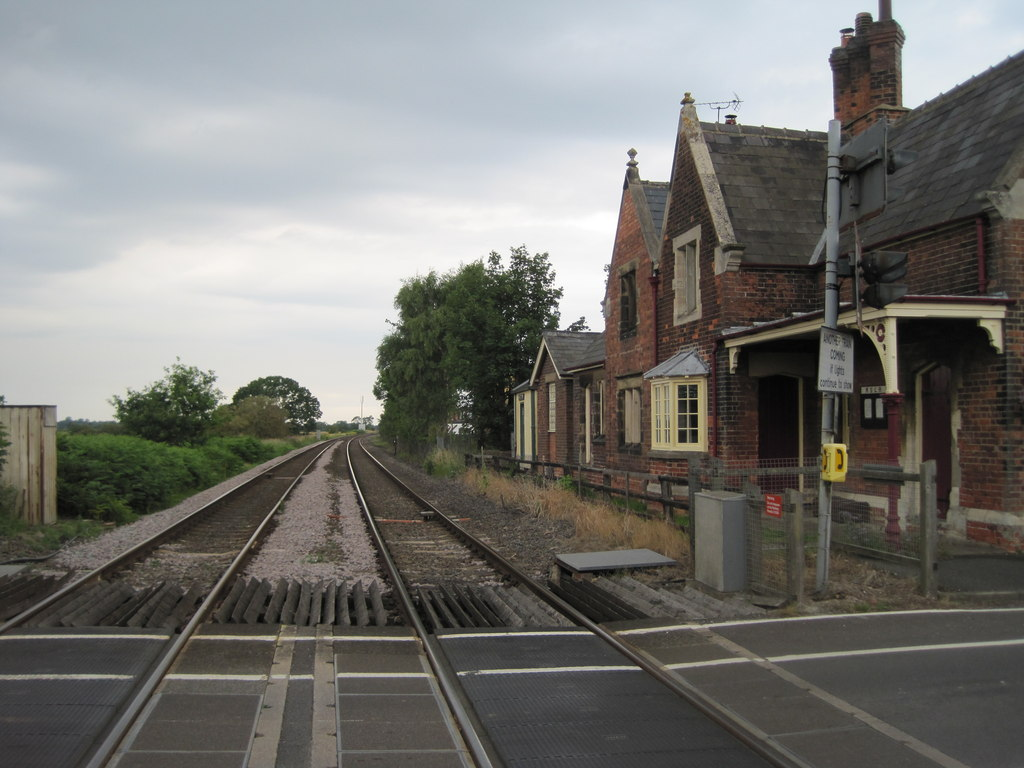
The track at Moortown

Moortown railway station was a railway station serving both the village of Moortown and town of Caistor in Lincolnshire, England on the line between Grimsby and Lincoln opened in 1848 and closed in 1965.

Preceding station	Historical railways	Following station
Holton Le Moor; Line open, station closed	Great Central Railway	North Kelsey; Line open, station closed
