= Maldon Sea Salt =

British salt company

Coordinates: 51.722°N 0.665°E

Maldon Salt
- Industry: Food and Beverage (F&B); Salt
- Founded: 1882
- Headquarters: Maldon, England
- Products: Original Sea Salt; Flavoured Sea Salt
- Website: https://maldonsalt.com/

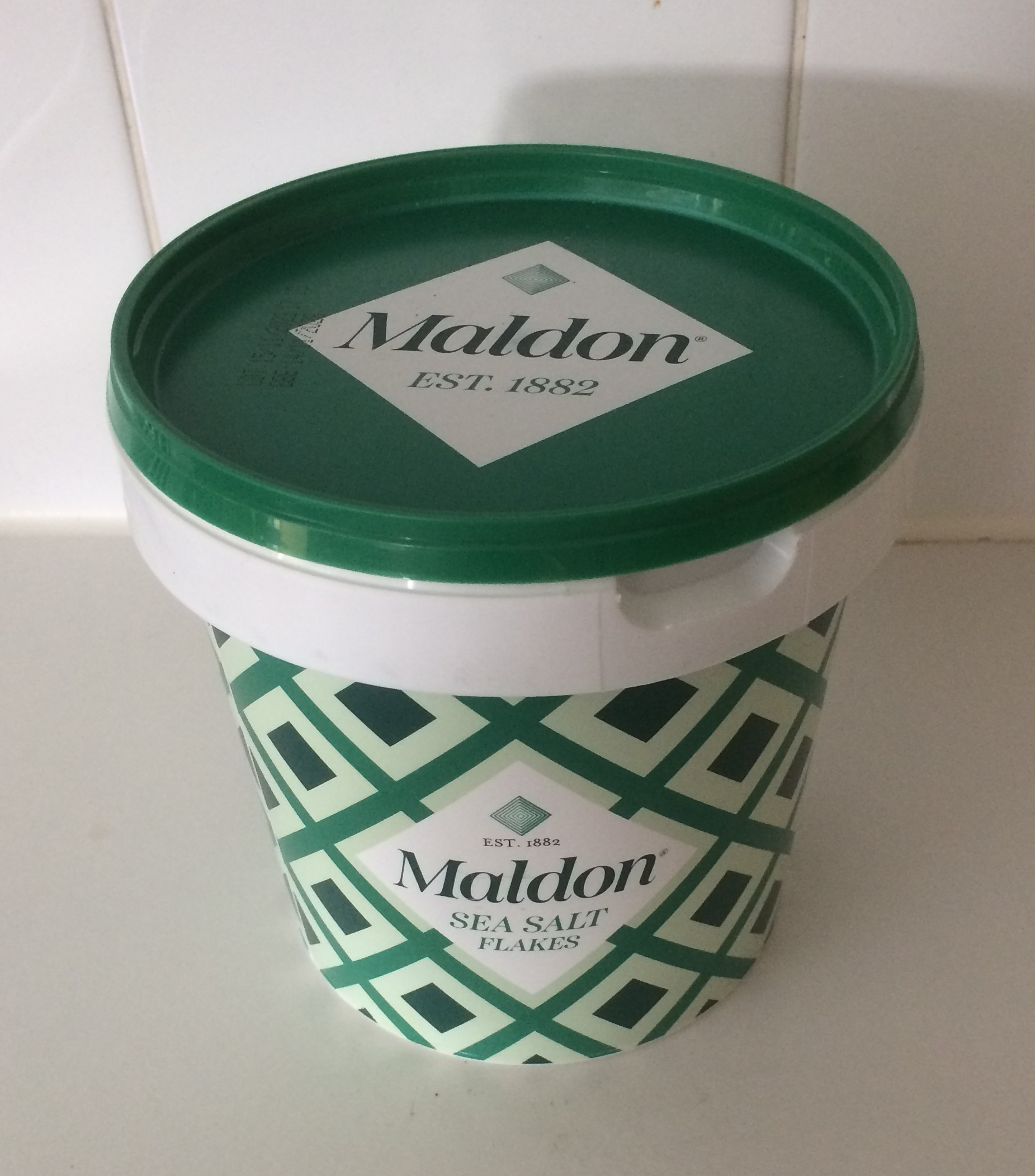
570g plastic tub

Maldon Salt Company Limited, trading as Maldon Salt, is a salt-producing company in Maldon on the high-salinity banks of the Blackwater Estuary in Essex, England. The company uses German salt as well as British salt in its products. The river is favoured by flat tide-washed salt marshes, high winds, and low rainfall.

Maldon salt is distributed to over 60 countries worldwide.

== History ==
Sea salt production in the coastal town of Maldon dates back to the time of Roman Britain when clay-lined salt evaporation ponds were constructed, and according to the Domesday Book, 45 lead pans were used to manufacture salt there in 1086.

The Maldon Salt Company was founded under its current name in 1882, having previously been part of a local coal firm. In the 1990s and early 2000s, Maldon's salt grew in popularity after being used by prominent chefs including Ruth Rogers, Delia Smith, and Jamie Oliver.

== Salt ==
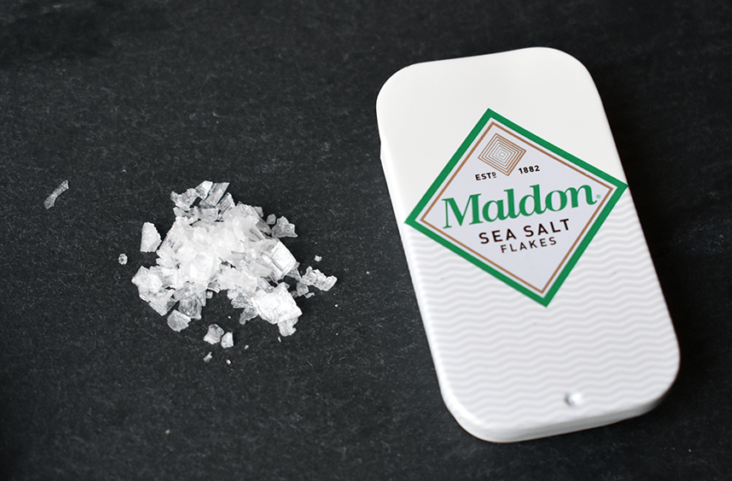
Flakes and pyramid chunks

Maldon Sea Salt is made on a large scale by evaporating brine over an elaborate network of modern gas-fired brick flues. At one time crystal drying was by woodburning stove and later by industrial oven before the use of an oscillator was introduced. In 2017 it was said that inverted pyramid-shaped flakes prevented the salt from caking, and the resulting flakes from their breakdown were used as a finishing salt.

The company claims that the salt's low magnesium content means it has less of a bitter aftertaste than other salts. Salt gained from evaporating seawater has a higher magnesium ion content than some table salts.

The company sells its original sea salt flakes, as well as smoked, chilli, and garlic varieties.

In 2026, The Observer revealed that imported rock salt from Germany was being delivered at a rate of 50 tonnes per week to their Essex factory. Maldon maintains they can still claim the product is “100% sea salt flakes” from Essex because the German imports are used as part of the salt-on-salt production process to “enrich the seawater”.
