= Holton Le Moor railway station =

Former railway station in Lincolnshire, England

Coordinates: 53.4624°N 0.3559°W

Holton-le-Moor
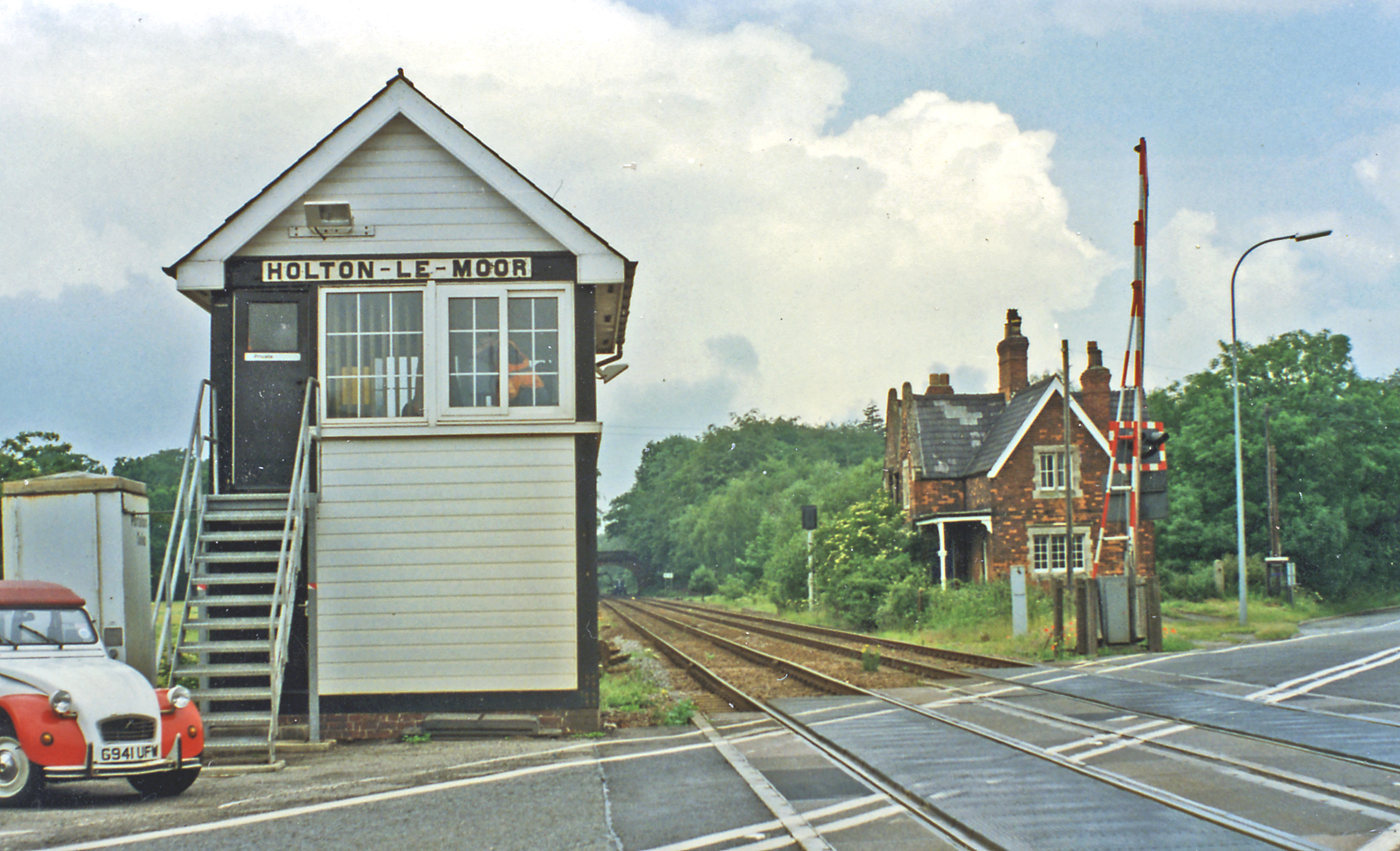
- Station remains and signalbox (1997)

General information
- Location: Holton le Moor, Lincolnshire, England
- Platforms: 2

Other information
- Status: Disused

History
- Original company: Great Grimsby and Sheffield Junction Railway
- Pre-grouping: Great Central Railway
- Post-grouping: London and North Eastern Railway

Key dates
- 1 November 1848: Opened as Holton
- 1 July 1923: Renamed Holton-le-Moor
- 1 November 1965: Closed
Location

Holton Le Moor railway station was a station in Holton le Moor, Lincolnshire, England. It was opened in 1848 and closed in 1965.

Former Services

Preceding station	Disused railways	Following station
Claxby and Usselby	Great Central Railway	Moortown
