= North Kelsey railway station =

Former railway station in Lincolnshire, England

Coordinates: 53.5020°N 0.3889°W

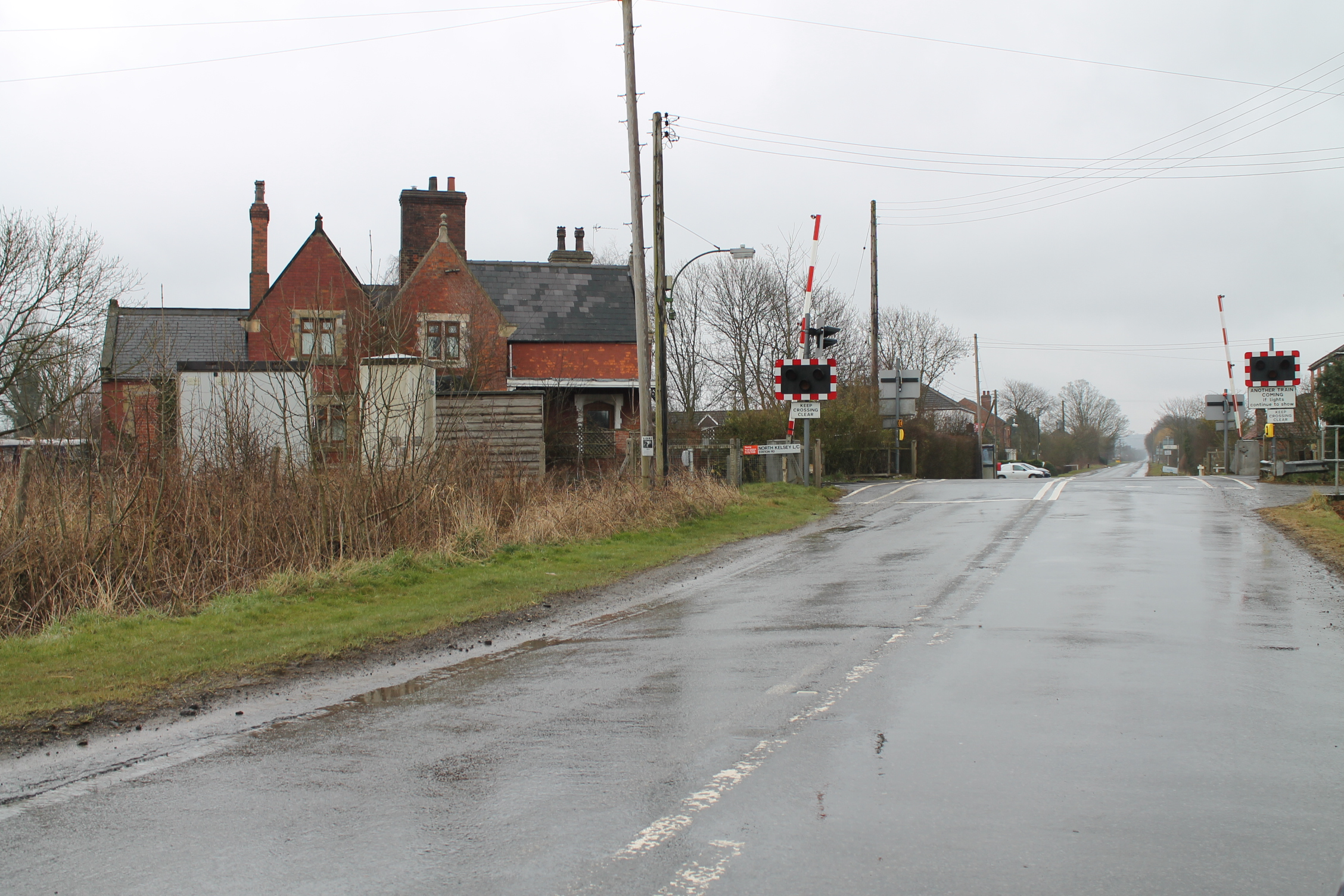
North Kelsey station

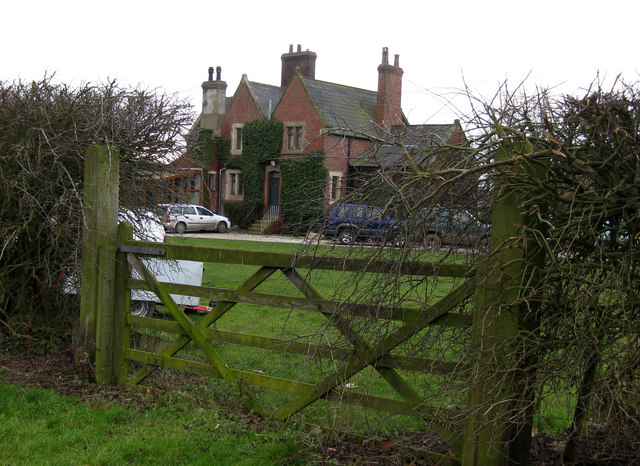
Former station building, now a private house

North Kelsey railway station was a railway station serving both the village of North Kelsey and town of Caistor in Lincolnshire, England, it was opened in 1848 and closed in 1965.

Former Services

Preceding station	Disused railways	Following station
Moortown	Great Central Railway	Howsham
