= Bigby Road Bridge railway station =

Disused railway station in Brigg, North Lincolnshire

Coordinates: 53.54998°N 0.48080°W

Bigby Road Bridge

General information
- Location: Brigg, North Lincolnshire; England

Other information
- Status: Disused

History
- Original company: Manchester, Sheffield and Lincolnshire Railway
- Pre-grouping: Manchester, Sheffield and Lincolnshire Railway

Key dates
- 1 March 1852: Opened
- August 1882: Closed

Bigby Road Bridge railway station served the town of Brigg, North Lincolnshire, England, from 1852 to 1882 on the Great Grimsby and Sheffield Junction Railway.

== History ==
The station was opened on 1 March 1852 by the Manchester, Sheffield and Lincolnshire Railway. It was only open on Thursdays, although a special train ran on Wednesday 17 October 1855, which served a Bazaar. It closed in August 1882.

Preceding station	Disused railways	Following station
Howsham; Line open, station closed	Manchester, Sheffield and Lincolnshire Railway; Great Grimsby and Sheffield Junction Railway	Barnetby; Line and station open
