= Cooks Yard =

Boatbuilder in Maldon, Essex, England

Coordinates: 51.7295°N 0.6879°E

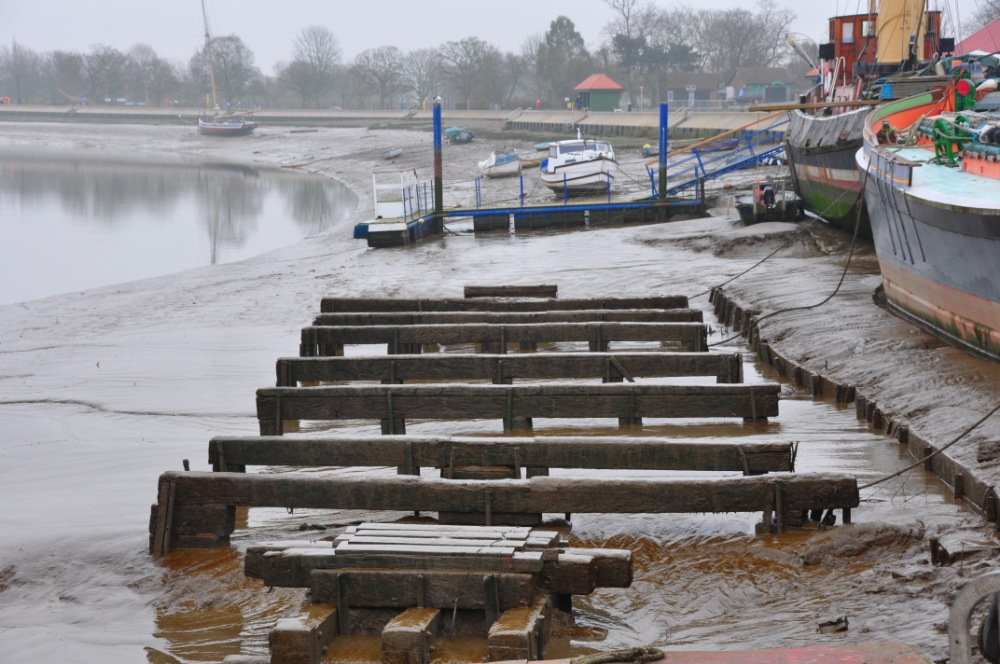
Barge blocks in the River Blackwater at Cooks Yard

Cooks Yard is a boat-building business established by Walter Cook in 1894 on the bank of the River Blackwater at Maldon, Essex, England. Originally known as Walter Cook and Son and specialising in the building of Thames sailing barges, it operated until the 1980s - at which time, it was the last remaining barge yard in Britain.

In 1999, Topsail Charters took on the lease of the yard and refurbished it. They restored boat building and barge repair to the site and maintain the last set of original barge repair blocks on the east coast of England.

== History ==
Walter Cook took on the shipyard on the River Blackwater at Maldon in 1894 to build the Thames sailing barge Dawn, which had been ordered by James Keeble, a member of a well-known local barge owning family.

The Dawn was launched in 1897 and, not long afterwards, the yard started work on the Lord Roberts, for Meesons of Battlesbridge. In 1902, the British King was launched - the second barge built by Walter Cook and Son for the Keebles.

As well as barges, Cooks yard built the steamboat Annie for Charrington the brewer. The Annie was used for taking passengers to Osea Island, and it was the first of a succession of pleasure craft that set off from the beach at Maldon promenade.

In 1907 Cooks were contracted by the Admiralty to build a prototype of the newly designed Montague Whaler. This resulted in many years of work on subsequent orders. The yard built a hundred whalers during World War II, launching roughly one every three weeks.

In the 1920s a visit by Josh Francis of the Colchester barge owners Francis and Gilders led to forty years of steady barge building work for Walter Cook and Son.

As wooden barges started to get old, their owners became reluctant to spend money repairing them and some of them were sold off for other uses. In 1937, Cooks converted the sailing barge Challenger to a yacht.

A lot of barges were requisitioned during World War II and many of them were damaged as a result. Cooks' yard was very busy with repair work after the war ended. In those days, too, a lot of barges came to the yard to be fitted with diesel engines, as the days of trading under sail alone began to pass.

=== Post war ===
In late 1945, and 1946, Cook's yard undertook the re-fitting for the owners, Chief Engineer Bill Wilson and Skipper Albert Brand, of the Southend Motor Navigation Co. of their 75 ft TSMV Julia Freak. She had been volunteered for Operation Dynamo in 1940, thereafter requisitioned by the Admiralty for service as a coastal minesweeper and handed back to her owners in an appallingly-neglected condition. Cookie's boat-builders helped S.M.N.CO Staff outfit her for the 1946 holiday season at Southend-on-Sea after the Admiralty released the vessel from her wartime service.

For that 1946 season, the refitted Julia Freak, built by Hayward's of Southend on Sea at their Yard hard by The Kursaal, during the 1920s, was re-registered as the New Prince Of Wales 1 in memory of the Fleet Flagship of that name sunk off La Panne during Operation Dynamo in May 1940 with Sub Lt Peter Bennett in command.

Also for the Southend Motor Navigation Co. in 1946 Cookie repaired and re-engined the 48 ft late-Victorian sailing Smack "May" (Regd # LO180 and renamed "Valerie" after her 1946 refit) after a sinking from bomb damage at her mooring alongside Southend Pier Pavilion, being salved and spending the rest of World War II in a mud-berth at Leigh-on-Sea. She returned to fishing service, used by The Southend Motor Navigation Co. to fulfil a fishery contract issued by and paid for the Ministry Of Food.

"Cookie" also built two new twin-screw passenger-carrying launches for the Southend Motor Navigation Co. in the late 1940s both successively larger replacements for the prewar Princess Maud which was volunteered for Operation Dynamo in 1940 and reported "lost to causes unknown". The second and larger of these two new launches Cookie built for Bill Wilson & Albert Brand was a 60 ft l.o.a. vessel, Christened New Princess Maud. The first and smaller 48 ft launch was rechristened Duchess of York. Again, both of these new passenger-carrying "pleasure boats" were replacements for war losses.

The Hythe at Maldon alongside Cookie's Yard became the Southend Motor Navigation Co. 's regular winter-layup base after World War II. All three of the aforementioned S.M.N.Co. pleasure boats worked in the summer-holidaymaker river-excursion trade until the mid-1960s.

These notes of the Southend Motor Navigation Co.'s long association with Cook's Yard are publicly posted "In Memoriam" for W.H.("Bill") Wilson, by his oldest son Lloyd, who has treasured memories of playing around the Cook's Yard slipway during the winter lay-up periods from 1946–1953, and was often loaned one of Cookie's small yard work-boats, to perfect his rowing abilities.

Walter Cook retired in 1946 and the yard was taken over by his son Clifford, who had been working there since 1919.

G F Sully contracted Cook's yard to maintain all their barges, including the Hydrogen. Cooks were also contracted by the Leigh Building Company to maintain their fleet of barges, which suffered from very rough treatment and were constantly needing repair.

== Current use ==
Clifford Cook retired in 1970 and the yard was bought by Barry Pearce and Gordon Swift, and later Roger Beckett. Cook's yard continued with barge maintenance and boat building until 1992, when the last shipwright left. In 1999, Topsail Charters took over the yard and restored shipwrighting and rigging to their traditional place by the river.

== See also ==
- Shipbuilding
