= Howsham railway station (Lincolnshire) =

Former railway station in England

Coordinates: 53.5237°N 0.4124°W

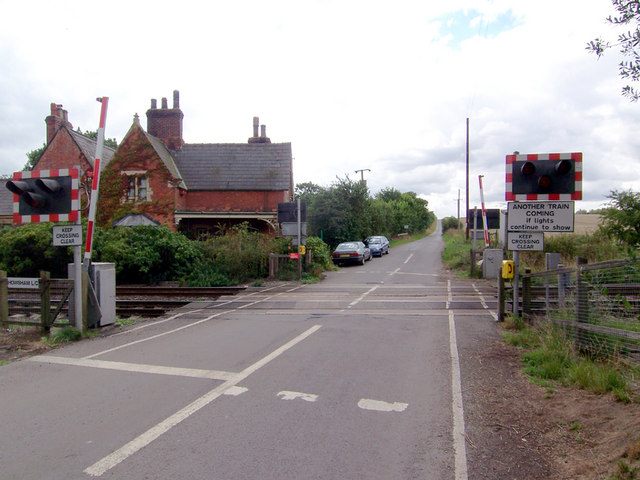
Former railway station, Howsham

Howsham railway station was a station in Howsham, Lincolnshire on the line between Grimsby and Lincoln, England. The station opened in 1848 closed on 1 November 1965 as were many neighbouring stations, however the line it stood on remains open.

Former Services

Preceding station	Historical railways	Following station
North Kelsey	Great Central Railway	Bigby Road Bridge
