= Moot Hall, Maldon =

Municipal building in Maldon, Essex, England

Moot Hall
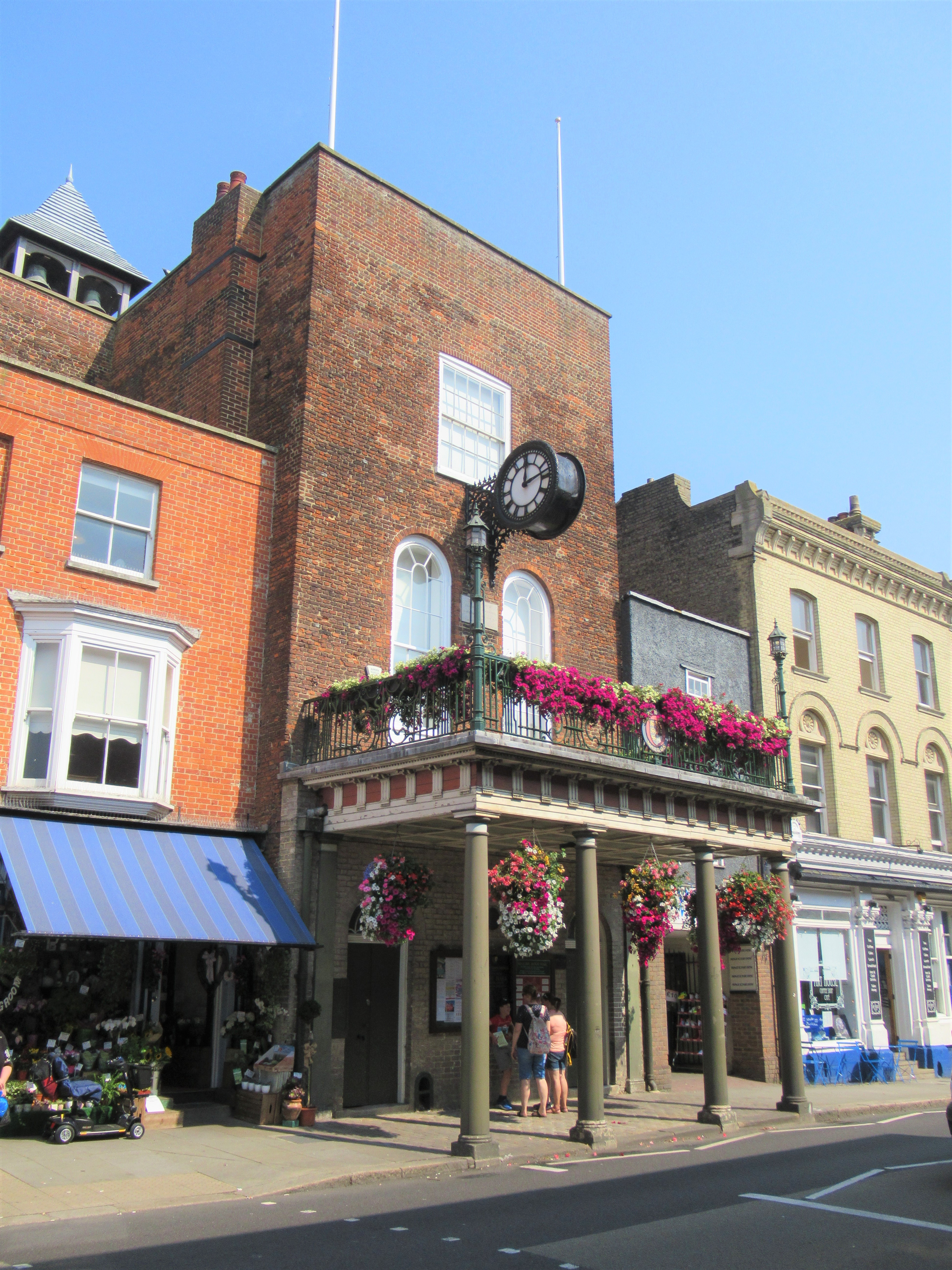
- Moot Hall

- Shown in Essex
- 51.7316°N 0.6773°E
- Location: High Street, Maldon

History
- Built: c.1420

Site notes
- Architectural style: Neoclassical style

Listed Building – Grade I
- Official name: Moot Hall
- Designated: 2 October 1951
- Reference no.: 1256887

The Moot Hall is a municipal building in the High Street in Maldon, Essex, England. The building, which was the headquarters of Maldon Borough Council, is a Grade I listed building.

== History ==
The first moot hall was a medieval structure on the west side of Silver Street close to the High Street.

The current building was originally part of a town house which was commissioned by the local member of parliament, Sir Robert Darcy: it was designed in the neoclassical style, built in red brick and completed in around 1420. Darcy's son, Roger, inherited the house in 1448, but, after Roger Darcy died in 1508, the house was left to deteriorate.

After the rear part of the house had been demolished in 1536, the building was acquired by the local bailiff, John Church, in 1539. Following Church's death in 1554, the building was again allowed to deteriorate until it was acquired by the borough council and converted for municipal use in 1576. Court hearings and civic meetings were transferred from the old moot hall in Silver Street at that time. The design of the new moot hall involved a symmetrical main frontage with three bays facing onto the High street. On the ground floor there was a tetrastyle portico with Doric order columns supporting a heavily modillioned canopy: at the back of the portico were two doorways with fanlights and a blind central alcove. On the first floor there were two full-height round headed sash windows, one of which gave access to the balcony, and on the second floor, there was a single sash window. The building included a castellated tower containing a spiral staircase, which spiralled anti-clockwise, at its north east corner, as well as a small annexe, which contained a vaulted basement, at its northwest corner. A projecting clock, made by Gillett, Bland & Co. and given to the town by the local member of parliament, George Courtauld, was installed on the front of the building in 1881; it was accompanied by a belfry, complete with five bells (cast by the same company), which was installed on the annexe roof at that time. An iron balustrade and a pair of lamps were also installed on the balcony in the late 19th century.

Internally, the ground floor of the moot hall was used as a prison before becoming a police station in 1836; it remained in that use until the police service moved to West Square in 1912 and was then converted for use as a committee room and as a mayor's parlour. The first floor was used as a magistrates' court until 1950 while the second floor was used as a council chamber for meetings of the borough council. Meanwhile, the annexe contained a jury room on the first floor and a muniment room on the second floor.

The moot hall continued to serve as the headquarters of Maldon Borough Council for much of the 20th century but ceased being the local seat of government when the enlarged Maldon District Council was formed in 1974. It subsequently became a local history museum and a venue for marriages and civil partnership ceremonies.

Works of art in the town hall include a portrait by Godfrey Kneller of King George I and a portrait by Robert Peake the Elder of Elizabeth Raleigh, wife of Sir Walter Raleigh.

== See also ==
- Grade I listed buildings in Essex
