= Moot Hall, Holton le Moor =

Civic hall in Holton le Moor, England

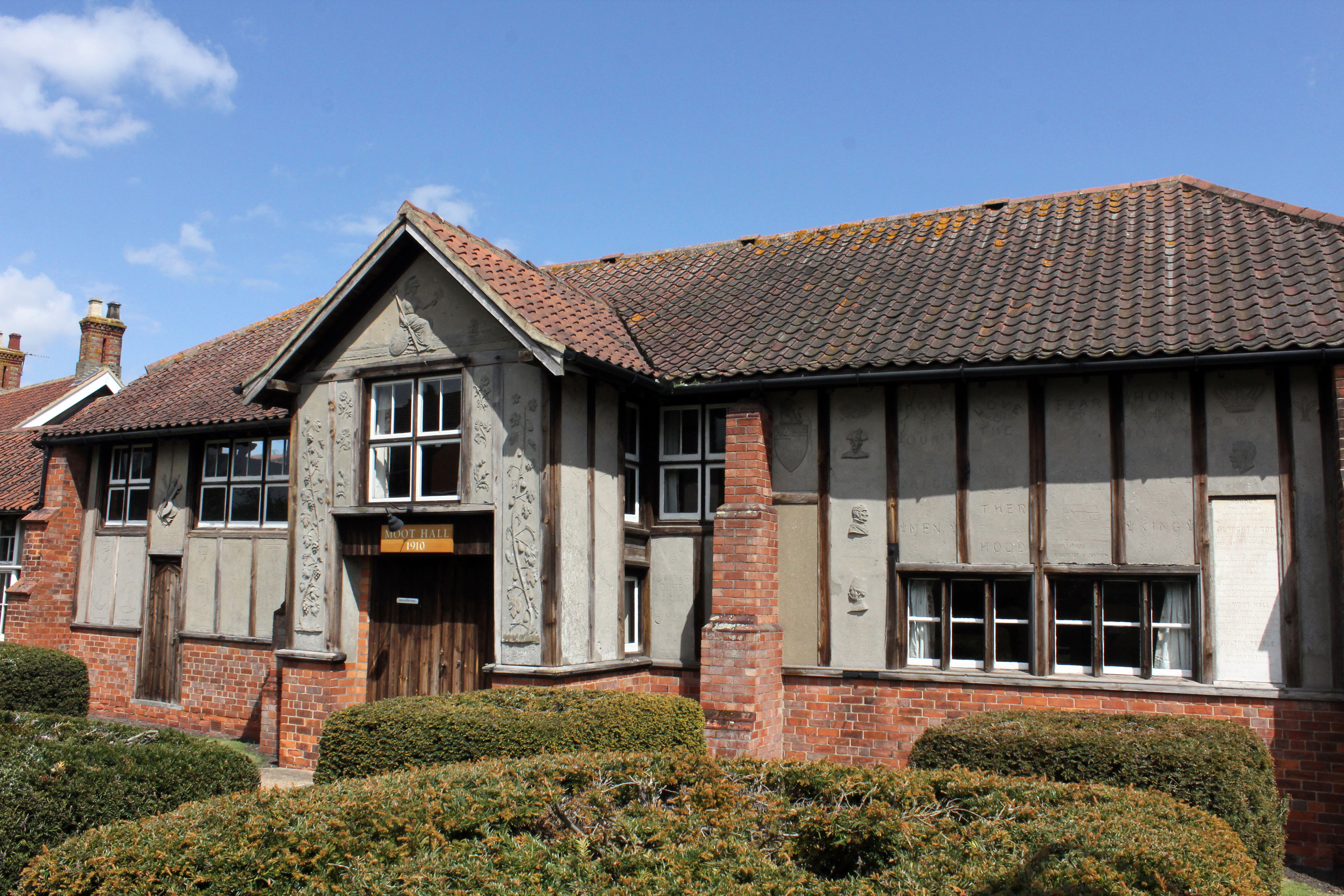
- Moot Hall, Holton le Moor

- Shown in Lincolnshire
- 53.4660°N 0.3732°W
- Location: Market Rasen Road, Holton le Moor

History
- Built: 1910

Site notes
- Architectural style: Tudor Revival style

The Moot Hall is a civic building in Market Rasen Road, Holton le Moor, Lincolnshire, England. The building, which continues to be used for civic meetings, was built in 1910.

== History ==
The moot hall was commissioned by the local lord of the manor, the Reverend Thomas George Dixon, in the early 20th century. The Gibbons family had owned the local manor house since 1780, and Dixon had assumed the name of Dixon by royal licence, in lieu of Gibbons, in 1907.

The building was designed in Tudor Revival style, built by local farm workers using timber frame construction techniques with a wattle and daub and brick nog infilling, and was completed in 1910.

The design involved an asymmetrical main frontage of six bays facing onto Market Rasen Road. The central bay, which was projected forward, featured a double-leaf wood doorway surmounted by a plaque inscribed with the words "Moot Hall 1910"; on the first floor, was a four-pane square window, with a gable above. The first bay on the left, which was single-storey, was fenestrated by a large six pane window, while the second bay on the left was fenestrated by a four-pane square window on the first floor and the third bay on the left was fenestrated by a long twelve-pane window on the first floor. Meanwhile, the first bay on the right was fenestrated by a long twelve-pane window on the ground floor and the second bay on the right was fenestrated by four-pane square window on the first floor. Internally, the principal room was a large assembly room which featured exposed beams and a gallery.

Extensive pargeting was added to the building between 1914 and 1915. A depiction of Britannia was inserted into the tympanum above the central bay. Other persons depicted in the pargeting included Dixon, the first caretaker Jonathan Mill, the local shepherd Robert Appleton, Horatio Nelson, 1st Viscount Nelson, Arthur Wellesley, 1st Duke of Wellington, King George V, Saint George and Saint Hugh. There was also a depiction of Lincoln Cathedral on the south gable-end and extensive use of foliage, evoking memories of the Arts and Crafts movement which was popular at the time of construction. The architectural historian, Nikolaus Pevsner, described the building as "a curiosity".

Although ownership of the building remained with the Gibbons family, management of the hall was vested in a management committee which was established with charitable status in 1974. The Gibbons family remained actively involved in raising money for the restoration of the building, and the local branch of the Women's Institute has also been closely involved in the preservation of the building and its surroundings.
