= Timekeeper trilogy =

Series of young adult novels by Tara Sim

Timekeeper Trilogy
- Cover art for "Timekeeper", book one of the Timekeeper trilogy
- Timekeeper; Chainbreaker; Firestarter
- Author: Tara Sim
- Language: English
- Genre: Fantasy literature, Steampunk, Young adult fiction
- Publisher: Skyhorse Publishing
- Published: 8 Nov 2016 - 15 Jan 2019
- No. of books: 3

The Timekeeper Trilogy is a series of young adult steampunk novels by Tara Sim. It is the author's debut trilogy. The series comprises Timekeeper (2016), Chainbreaker (2018), and Firestarter (2019).

== Plot ==
=== Timekeeper ===
Aetas, an ancient god, once granted humans the power to control time. As retribution for this, he was supposedly killed by Chronos. Since the death of Aetas, humans have used clock towers to regulate the flow of time. Clock mechanics are valuable members of society, because a broken clock tower can cause time to flow abnormally or even stop.

In England in 1875, 17-year-old Danny Hart works as a mechanic. Danny suffers from panic attacks after being injured by a bomb planted in a clock tower. Additionally, his father Christopher has been trapped in time since a clock tower broke down in Maldon three years ago. Matthias, Danny's mentor, was previously fired from the Maldon assignment and banished from the town after falling in love with Maldon's clock spirit.

Danny is summoned to repair the Colton Clock Tower in Enfield, where he meets clock's spirit, also named Colton. Because Colton is unable to travel far from his tower, he repeatedly sabotages his own mechanisms in order to get Danny to come and repair them. They fall in love, although relationships between spirits and humans are forbidden.

A series of bombing attacks target clock towers around England. The lead mechanic pulls Danny from the Enfield post, citing concerns about Danny's mental health. Several mechanics are injured or killed by bombs. Danny secretly trades assignments with Daphne, another mechanic, so he can continue visiting Colton in Enfield. Daphne is injured in an explosion, casting suspicion Danny. As a result, they are both fired.

Danny discovers that Matthias has secretly been living with Evaline, the clock spirit from Maldon. Evaline carried her own central cog outside the city so she could follow Matthias to London, unaware that this would cause the town of Maldon to become frozen in time. Colton's central cog is stolen, which freezes Enfield. Danny realizes that Matthias is behind the bombings; Matthias hopes to install Evaline's cog into another clock tower so that they can be together. Daphne, Danny, and Colton fight against Matthias. They retrieve Colton's cog and restore Enfield's normal flow of time. Matthias is arrested and put on trial. Evaline returns to Maldon, freeing Danny's father and the other trapped citizens. Danny is reinstated as a mechanic and permanently assigned to Enfield, where he continues his secret relationship with Colton.

== Reception ==
A reviewer for Bustle praised Timekeeper's LGBTQ+ representation, including the fact that Danny's sexuality is not the source of the novel's conflict. Publishers Weekly gave Timekeeper a positive review, praising its cast of "complex and diverse characters" and calling the novel "enjoyable" and "well-realized". A review in Entertainment Weekly praised the novel's "steampunk influence with more modern sensibilities", while noting that the plot "does drag in parts" due to Danny's emotional outbursts. Kirkus Reviews gave Timekeeper a mixed review. The review praised the novel's "killer premise and admirably thorough worldbuilding". The same review criticized the "clumsy word choices and jarring shifts in perspective", as well as the plot's reliance on "implausible coincidences" and a deus ex machina climax.

Kirkus Reviews gave a mixed review to Chainbreaker. The review praised Sim's worldbuilding and wrote that the "romantic scenes sizzle". However, the reviewer noted factual inaccuracies regarding the Indian setting and criticized Daphne's lack of character development. Overall, the review noted that the novel "has plenty of ambition and moments of admirably lyrical prose" but "does not fully realize its promising premise."

Kirkus Reviews gave a mixed review to Firestarter. The review called the prose "beautifully crafted" and praised the diversity of the cast, including queer protagonists and an ethnically diverse supporting cast. The review also stated that the book was "overplotted, leaving little space to explain previous events or the world’s rules".
