= Bentall =

Bentall may refer to:

- Bentall (surname)
- Bentall 5, a skyscraper in Vancouver, British Columbia, Canada
- Bentall Building, an historic building in Victoria, British Columbia, Canada
- Bentall Centre, Kingston upon Thames, a shopping centre in London, England
- Bentall Centre, Vancouver, Canada, an office complex and underground shopping mall
- Bentall procedure, a cardiac surgery operation pioneered by Hugh Bentall
- E.H. Bentall & Co., an agricultural and automotive manufacturer founded by Edward Hammond Bentall
- Bentalls, a U.K. department store chain
