= Anglo-Viking treaty of 994 =

The peace treaties agreed between King Æthelred II of England and the leaders of the Viking forces were negotiated during a prolonged period of Viking raiding throughout the south of England in the late tenth century. Following the Viking victory at the Battle of Maldon in 991, Æthelred agreed to pay tribute of £10,000 in exchange for a cessation of raids and a promise of military protection. A second treaty, known as II Æthelred, was concluded in 994 with three Norwegian leaders, including Olaf Tryggvason, and involved a larger payment of £16,000 along with formal provisions for resolving future disputes. The 994 agreement also included an amnesty clause forgiving all prior violence between the two parties.In the aftermath of the 994 treaty, Olaf Tryggvason was baptised as a Christian with Æthelred as his sponsor, and he kept his promise never to attack England again. He subsequently disappears from English sources and is credited in Scandinavian records with converting Norway, Iceland, Greenland, and the Shetlands to Christianity.

== Peace treaty of 991 ==
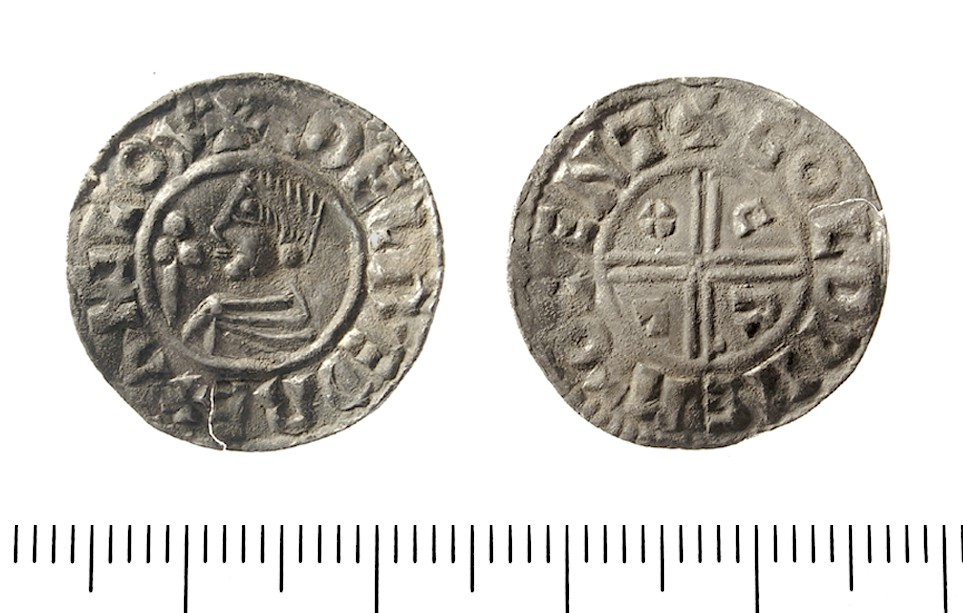
Coin from the reign of King Æthelred II of England

After the Vikings defeated the English at the Battle of Maldon (11 August 991), a series of Viking raids occurred throughout areas of the south of England. This continued torment of the English people led King Æthelred to sign a peace treaty with the Vikings, in which the king promised provisions and the payment (referred to as Danegeld) of £10,000 in return for the Vikings to cease their assaults on the English and for their military support against any enemy attacks upon the land. The most influential leader among the Vikings appears to have been Olaf Tryggvason, who would later become king of Norway. Ultimately, the agreement failed, and Viking raids resumed not long after.

== Terms of the 994 treaty ==
Æthelred II once again attempted to broker peace with the Viking forces in 994, after heavy raiding had taken place throughout the year. This new treaty (often referred to as II Æthelred) was made between Æthelred and three leaders of the Norwegian Viking armies, called Guthmund Steitason, Josteinn and Olaf Tryggvason (referred to as Anlaf in the original document). Just as had been the case in the treaty of 991, the Vikings were asked to offer their protection against other forces who threatened the peace in England, including attacks launched by other Vikings. The raiders were once again paid tribute, though this time the sum of Danegeld was £16,000. The treaty also contained an amnesty clause, whereby all past violence was forgiven, as the treaty stated "all the slaughter and all the harrying and all the injuries which were committed before the peace was established, all of them are to be dismissed, and no one is to avenge it or ask for compensation". This was one of the first texts produced before 1200 that specifically stated that neither party could ask for redress (compensation) for any previous offense.

The agreement also made clear how any further disputes would be settled, as it stated that if the English killed more than eight Viking men, this would be considered a breach of the peace and a proclamation of war. Meanwhile, if a member of the Viking army murdered an English subject, they alone would be outlawed, indicating that King Æthelred was prepared to make substantial compromises to achieve peace and military assistance.

== Aftermath ==
After the agreement was reached, Olaf Tryggvason was invited to Andover in honour and baptised as a Christian, with Æthelred acting as his sponsor. As he had in 991, Olaf promised to never again attack England, though this time he kept his word. After this time, Olaf is never again mentioned in the Anglo-Saxon Chronicle and disappears from English history, instead appearing in some of the earliest known Scandinavian sources. It is stated in the Anglo-Saxon Chronicle that gifts were presented to Olaf at his meeting in Andover with King Æthelred, and it is possible that these may have included alms or ships to assist with his conquest of Norway. Scandinavian sources also mention that Olaf was provided with a clergy, to aid him in his endeavour of converting Norway to Christianity; between 995 and 1000, Olaf had successfully converted Norway, Iceland, Greenland and the Shetlands to Christianity. Therefore, while a peace treaty was established between the Viking leaders and Æthelred in 994, it is also possible that the meeting at Andover may have concluded in the English dynasty and Olaf becoming allies.
