= Edward Bentall =

Edward Bentall may refer to:

- Edward Bentall, chairman of Bentalls department store
- Edward Bentall (footballer) (1923–1947), English footballer
- Edward Hammond Bentall (1814–1898), English manufacturer and politician
