= E. H. Bentall & Co =

Former British agricultural and automobile manufacturer

E. H. Bentall & Co Ltd
- Industry: Agriculture & Automobiles
- Defunct: 1984
- Fate: Became part of Acrow Group of companies in 1961, before going into liquidation 1984.
- Headquarters: Heybridge, Maldon, United Kingdom
- Key people: William Bentall; Edward Hammond Bentall; Edmund Ernest Bentall; Charles Bentall

E. H. Bentall & Co.Ltd. was a British company, that primarily made agricultural equipment in Heybridge, Essex before moving for a short period into automobile production. The company's cars were manufactured between 1906 until production stopped in 1912, with a total of 100 cars made. The company would later become part of the ill-fated Agricultural & General Engineers group, before being saved from the administrators by the Bentall family. It would later become part of the Acrow group who merged it with Simplex to create Bentall Simplex. After Acrow went into administration in 1984, the new owners TB Group closed the Heybridge factory.

== Company formation ==
William Bentall, a farmer who lived in Goldhanger, invented some time between 1760 and 1790 the Goldhanger plough (also known as the Essex plough), which was put on the market in 1797. In 1805, William Bentall formed a company to manufacture agricultural equipment sited on the south bank of the Chelmer and Blackwater Navigation in Heybridge, Essex. In 1814, William's son Edward Hammond Bentall was born. Edward joined the firm at 22 in 1836, and by 1839 he had incorporated it as E. H. Bentall & Co., and in 1841 patented an improved version of his father's Goldhanger plough. In 1851, Edward's 1843 patented design for the Broad Share Cultivator won the company the gold medal at the Great Exhibition, with a further three first prizes at the Royal Agricultural Society Show in 1859. Other patented inventions by Edward included the improved oil cake mill and the prize root pulper, which both won first prize at the Royal Society meet at Chester in 1858. With these successes Bentall's reputation grew and orders were coming in from all over the world. During the mid-1800s Bentall's started building housing for their staff at Woodfield Cottages, Heybridge. By 1889 Edward's son, Edmund Ernest Bentall had started to run the business.

== Bentall Cars ==
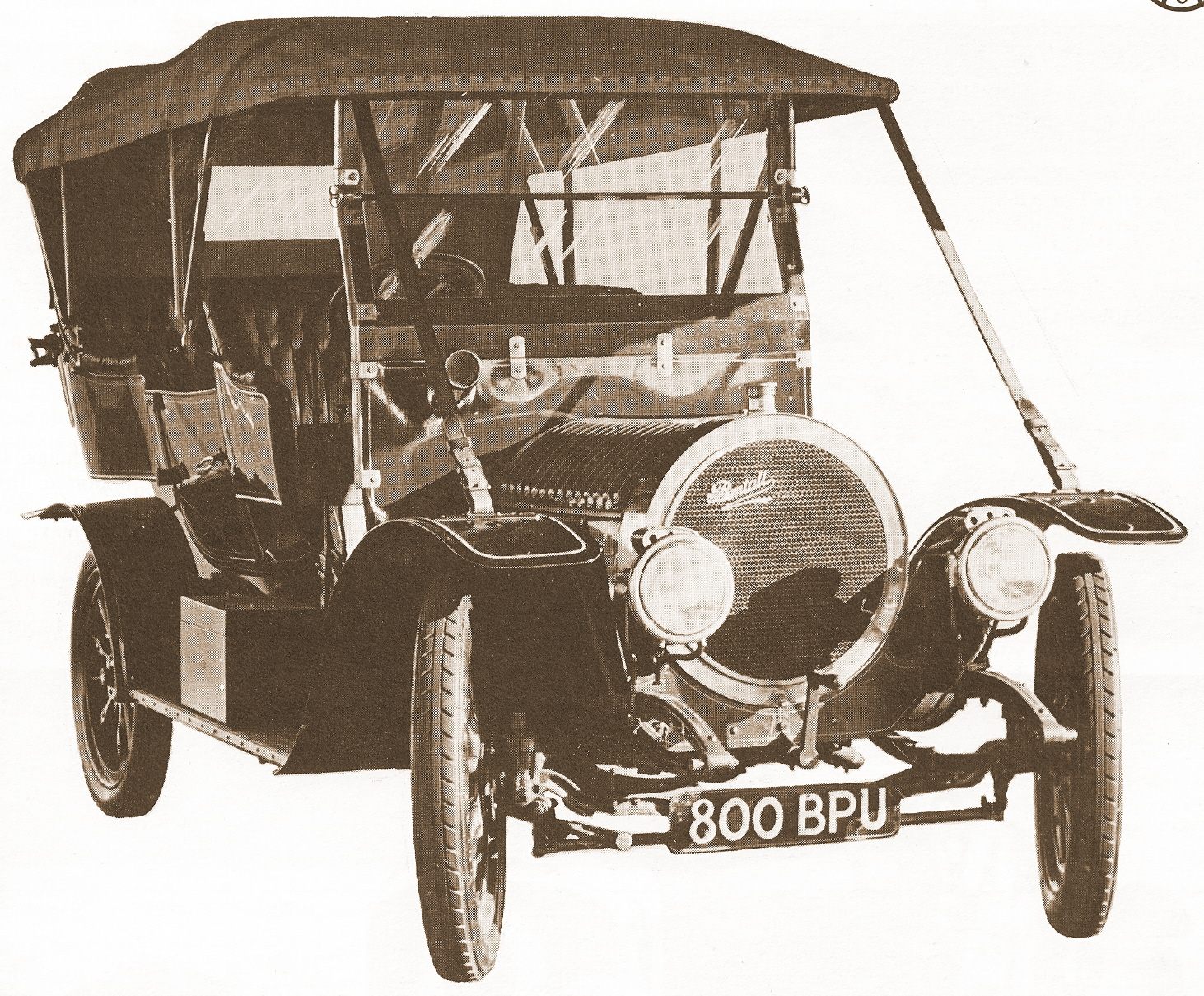
Bentall 16/20 tourer of 1908

In the early 20th century, Edmund Ernest Bentall, Edward's son, had started designing his own petrol engine to power agricultural machinery, which would prove popular as it used shared componentry and was economical to run. By 1904, car enthusiast Edmund, who had already owned a Georges Richard, a Daimler and a Singer, had designed two prototype cars in the corner of the Bentall's factory, using parts bought in. These cars were never sold and remained with the Bentall family. However the company saw this as an expansion plan, and in 1905 started developing prototypes using Crypto chassis frames and Lemoine axles, before progressing to cars using their own components. The initial design was shown at the 1906 Olympia Show on Stand 123. Bentall produced their own chassis and engine, but the bodies were produced by local firms Mannions of Chelmsford and Adams of Colchester.

The cars were marketed in London by Acre Autocar Co, and in Essex by Glovers of Witham, and were not cheap with the 11 hp two seater costing £220, and £420 providing a 16/20 Landaulette. The company stopped production in 1912, probably as it was not a financial success with the set up costs for the tooling (said to be £60,000) probably not recouped.

It is believed that only two Bentall Cars still exist.

=== Models ===
Model	Manufactured year	Cylinder	Displacement (cm^{3})	Wheelbase (mm)	Source
9 HP	1906	2	1208	2438	
16 HP	1907–1910	4	2418	2819	
11 HP	1908–1909	2	2492	2438	
16/20 HP	1908–1912	4	2986	2819	
16/20 HP	1911–1913	4	3261	3048	
18 HP	1911–1913	4	3563	2972	
8 HP	?	2			
16 HP	?	2			

== The agricultural business ==
The company grew, producing stationary engines, valves and farm implements, was formally incorporated in 1909, and by the First World War was employing over 600 people. During the war part of the factory was turned over to producing shell casings. However in 1919 the company was convinced into joining a new concern, Agricultural & General Engineers Ltd. During the 1920s the company was the largest exporter of feed cutters, supplying France, Belgium, Netherlands, South Africa and Scandinavian countries. However the company was financially struggling, and in 1930 they sold off the workers housing. Agricultural & General Engineers collapsed during the early 1930s after some disastrous investments in new ventures in the British Empire. The Bentall company was bought from the administrators by Edward Bentall, and his son Charles went about rebuilding the business. During the Second World War, the company continued to make agricultural equipment, but also made small machines parts for Handley-Page before making complete assemblies for the Halifax bomber. The company was taken public by Charles Bentall in 1946, and three years later they purchased the business of Tamkin Brothers, transferring the works to Heybridge where they had also invested in a new foundry. In 1955 Charles Bentall died, and during 1956-57 the company made a loss of £18,770. However the company appointed new chairman Godfrey Owtram at the beginning of 1956, and with his reorganisation, by March 1958 the company had returned to profit earning £57,168 and had purchased the business of J. W. Woolley & Co, transferring their production to Heybridge.

In 1961, Bentalls was purchased by the Acrow group of companies for £460,000. Bentalls, under Acrow ownership, purchased greenhouse manufacturer Simplex in 1981 from GEC, merging the organisations to become Bentall Simplex. However Acrow went into receivership in 1984 and in the administrators report in the Financial Times, Bentall Simplex was reported to have a turnover of £10.5 million and an order book worth £15 million. The business at the time was the largest manufacturer of grain storage equipment in the UK, were manufacturers and designers of feed processing and cereal factories, and manufacturers of equipment to the coffee industry. Bentall Simplex was purchased from the administrators, with the new owners TB Group of Driffield, Yorkshire closing the Heybridge factory to concentrate on their Scunthorpe site. The factory at Maldon was sold to Chief Industries Inc. of Grand Island, Nebraska in 1985.
