= River Blackwater, Essex =

River in Essex, England

Coordinates: 51.75365°N 0.65815°E

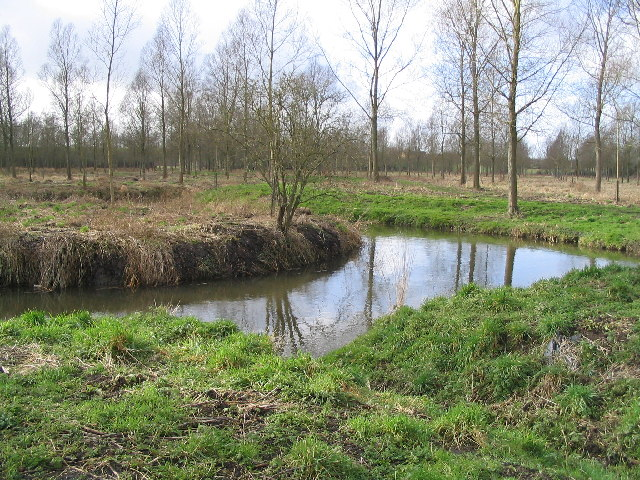
The River Blackwater, near to Kelvedon, Essex

The River Blackwater is a river in Essex, England. It rises as the River Pant in the northwest of the county, just east of Saffron Walden, and flows in a generally southeast direction to Bocking, near Braintree, via Great Sampford and Great Bardfield. At Bocking, it becomes the River Blackwater, and veers east to flow past Bradwell Juxta Coggeshall and Coggeshall. It then veers south, flowing past Kelvedon and Witham, before reaching Maldon. There, it veers east again and empties into the Blackwater Estuary, which in turn meets the North Sea at Mersea Island. The river is connected to Domsey Brook in Essex.

The River Blackwater has two major tributaries: the River Brain, which meets it just south of Witham, and the River Chelmer, which meets it just east of Maldon. The lower reaches of the Chelmer, from Chelmsford, were canalised in the 1790s, and the navigation diverts water north of the Blackwater through Maldon before emptying into the Blackwater Estuary at Heybridge Basin.

== History ==
The Viking-era Battle of Maldon possibly took place at the mouth of the river in 991. The Battle of Maldon, an early-11th-century fragmentary poem which describes the battle, mentions the Panta and describes a tidal causeway which could be the causeway leading to Northey Island. The Saxons were defeated and their leader, Byrhtnoth, was killed.

The Blackwater was a source of fish and oysters for the town of Maldon during the Roman occupation. The remains of Saxon fish traps were discovered in the river in the 1990s. During the winter of 1776, the Blackwater froze from Maldon to Osea island, a distance of some four miles. The ice trapped fishing and cargo-carrying vessels and blocked any imports of coal, oil, wool to Maldon.

In 1793 the Chelmer and Blackwater Navigation Company was formed by act of Parliament. Over the next four years, the company built a navigation from Chelmsford to meet the tidal estuary of the River Blackwater in Colliers Reach at the place that is today called Heybridge Basin (after the canal basin there).

The burgers of the borough of Maldon refused to allow the canal to pass through their borough, so the company routed it just outside the borough boundary, which is why it ended up at Colliers Reach, rather than at Maldon. From Chelmsford, the navigation mainly followed the course of the River Chelmer until it reached Beeleigh, near Maldon. Then it followed the course of the River Blackwater to Heybridge, and from there via a canal to the sea lock at Colliers Reach.

A weir connected the navigation to the tidal river Blackwater at Heybridge, where it powered a water mill. Heybridge mill was demolished after severe flooding in this area in 1953, but the mill house still stands. The river (known here as Heybridge Creek) was dammed between Heybridge Hall and Potman marsh in 1954 as part of a programme of flood defence improvements. Most of the water flowing down the River Blackwater nowadays flows over a weir at Beeleigh and along the tidal section of the Chelmer before rejoining the Blackwater at Heybridge Basin.

In 1865 HM Government passed the Maldon Harbour Act authorised construction of a wharf on the west side of the southern end of Heybridge Creek on land belonging to the Great Eastern Railway Company, and improving the channels of the rivers Chelmer and Blackwater. Ten thousand pounds were spent on widening, deepening and improving the river from the Fullbridge to just downriver from Herring's Point, near Heybridge Basin. After this, vessels had to pay a toll of 3 pence a ton if they were under 50 tons register or 6 pence a ton if they were over that.

A medieval 5-arched stone bridge over the River Blackwater at Heybridge (from which that village got its name) was replaced in 1870 by a 2-arched brick one. That bridge was at the north end of the Causeway, at its junction with Heybridge Street and Holloway Road, but the bridge there now is hardly distinguishable as such.

== Industry ==
The Maldon Crystal Salt Company produces crystalline sea salt by traditional panning techniques from the waters of the Blackwater.

== Osea Island ==
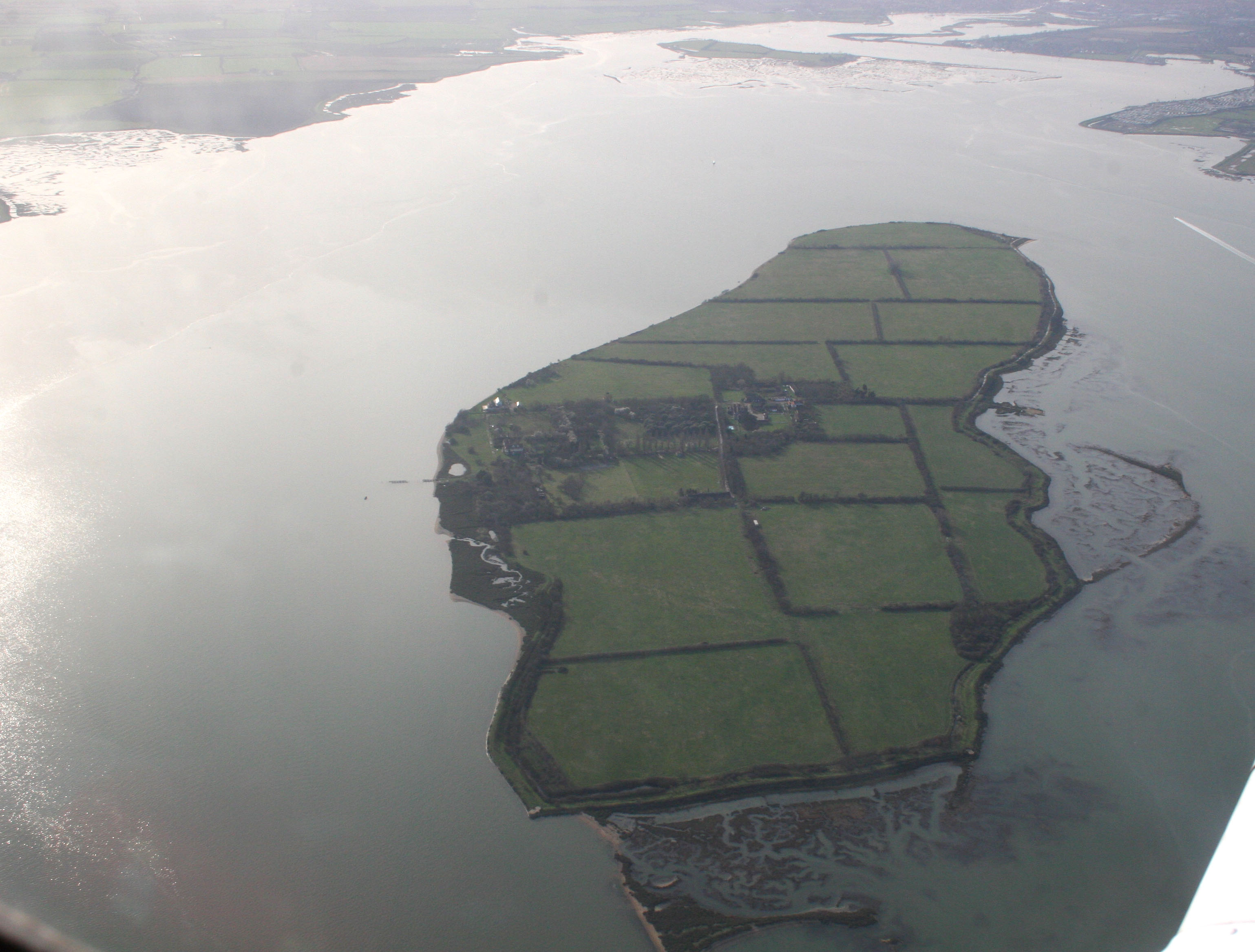
Osea Island, in the Blackwater Estuary

Osea Island is a privately owned Island that is situated on the Blackwater Estuary, north of Steeple.

== Northey Island ==
Northey Island is owned by the National Trust, and is approximately one mile to the west of Osea Island. It is part of an ancient landscape and is connected to the shore by a tidal causeway. It may have been the site of the Battle of Maldon against Viking invaders in 991 AD; it now offers birdwatching opportunities.

== See also ==
- Chelmer and Blackwater Navigation
- Cooks Yard – shipbuilding and repair yard on the Blackwater at Maldon
- Museum of Power – Langford pumping station extracts from the Blackwater
