= River Ter =

Ter
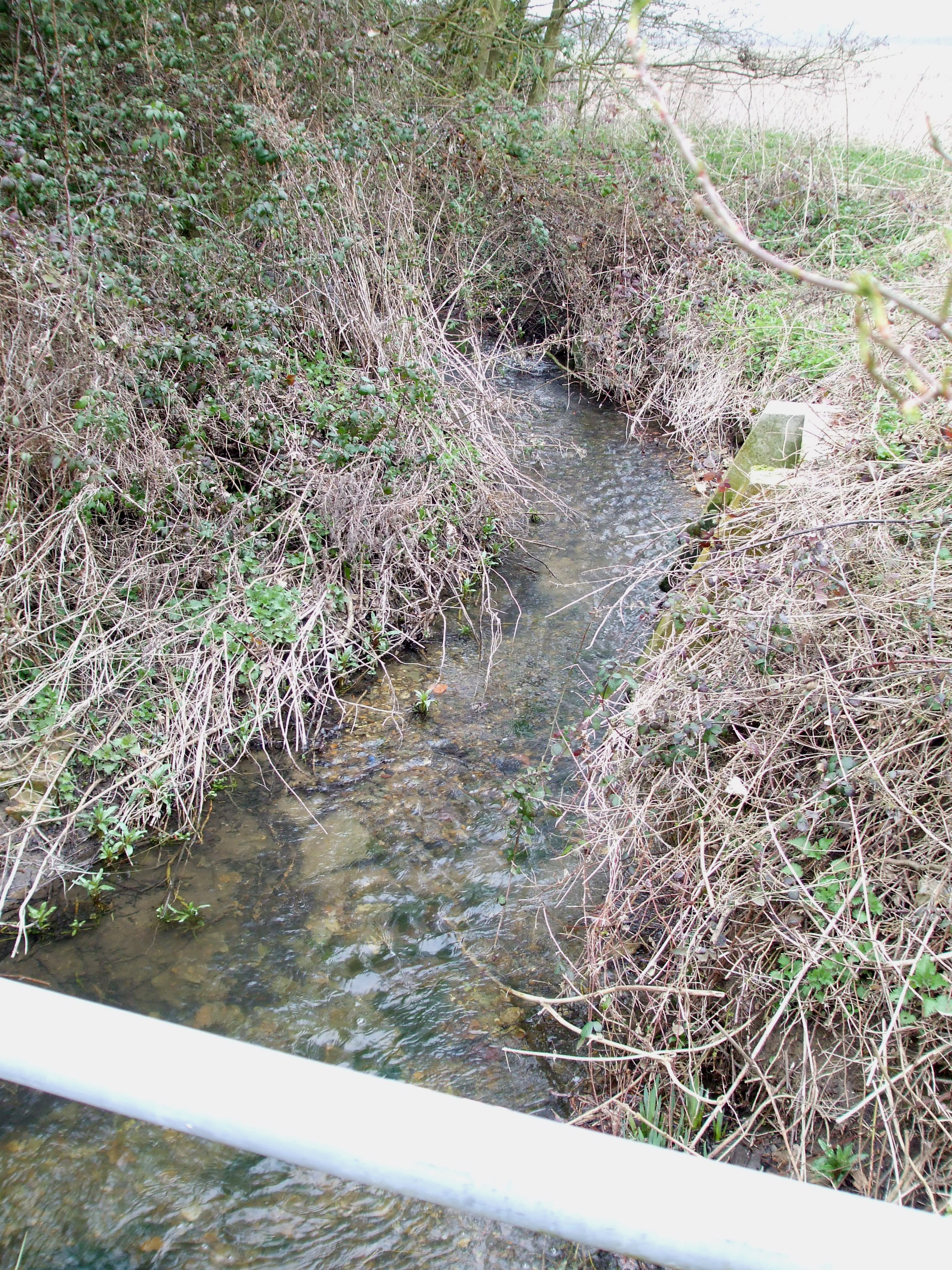
- River Ter near Willows Green

Location
- Country: England
- Region: Essex

Physical characteristics
- Source
  - location: Great Saling
  - coordinates: 51.8917°N 0.4592°E
  - elevation: 79 m (259 ft)
- Mouth: Chelmer and Blackwater Navigation
  - location: near Ulting
  - coordinates: 51.7503°N 0.5987°E
  - elevation: 9 m (30 ft)
- Length: 27.5 km (17.1 mi)

Basin features
- River system: Chelmer and Blackwater Navigation

The River Ter is a river in Essex, England. The river rises in Stebbing Green and flowing via Terling it joins the Chelmer and Blackwater Navigation at TL794089 near Rushes Lock. A small part of it, the River Ter SSSI near Great Leighs, has been a geological Site of Special Scientific Interest since 1994.

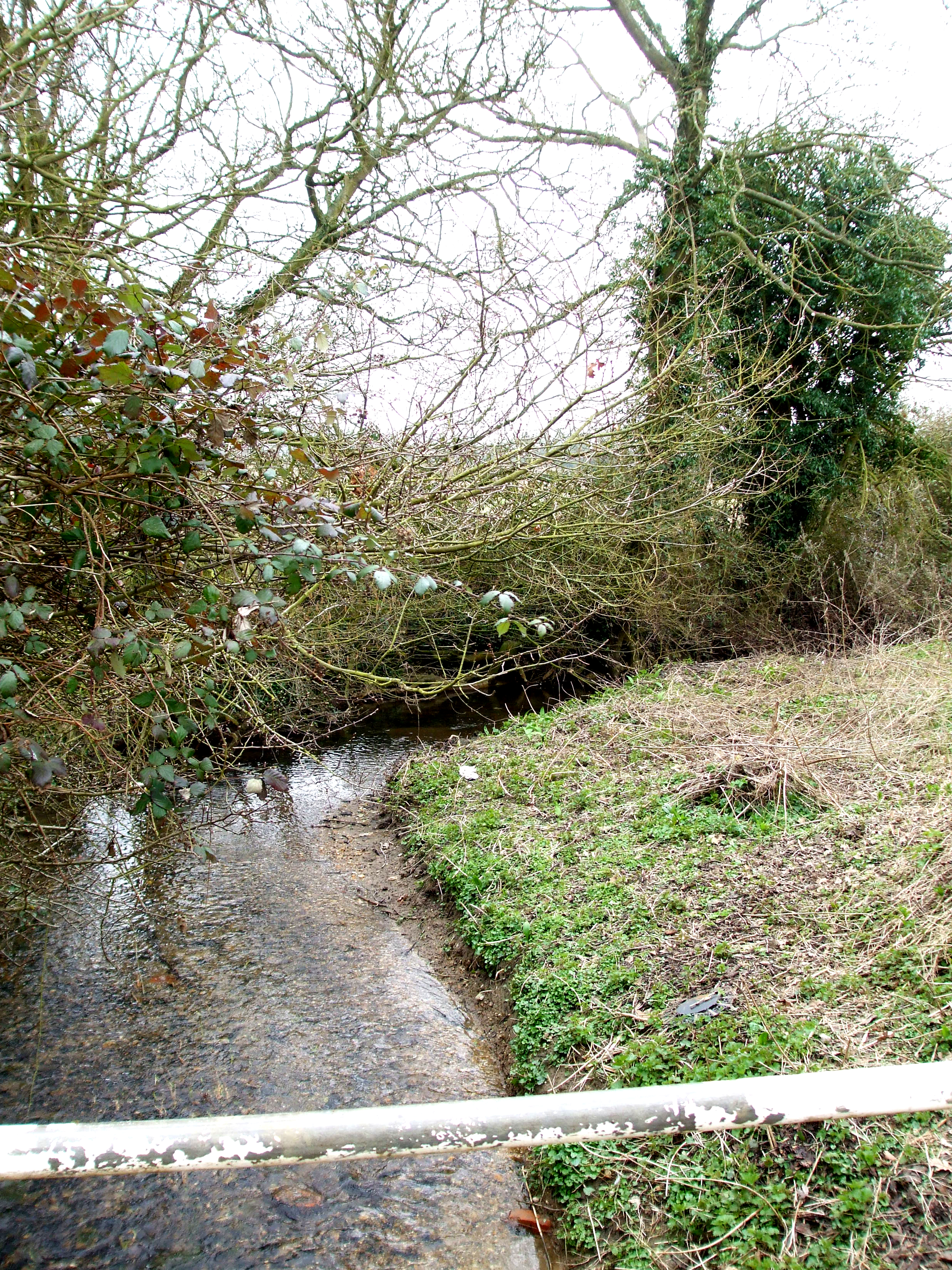
River Ter near Willows Green

== See also ==
- Museum of Power - Langford pumping station extracts from the Ter
