= Heybridge Basin =

Village in Essex, England

Coordinates: 51.731224°N 0.70905657°E

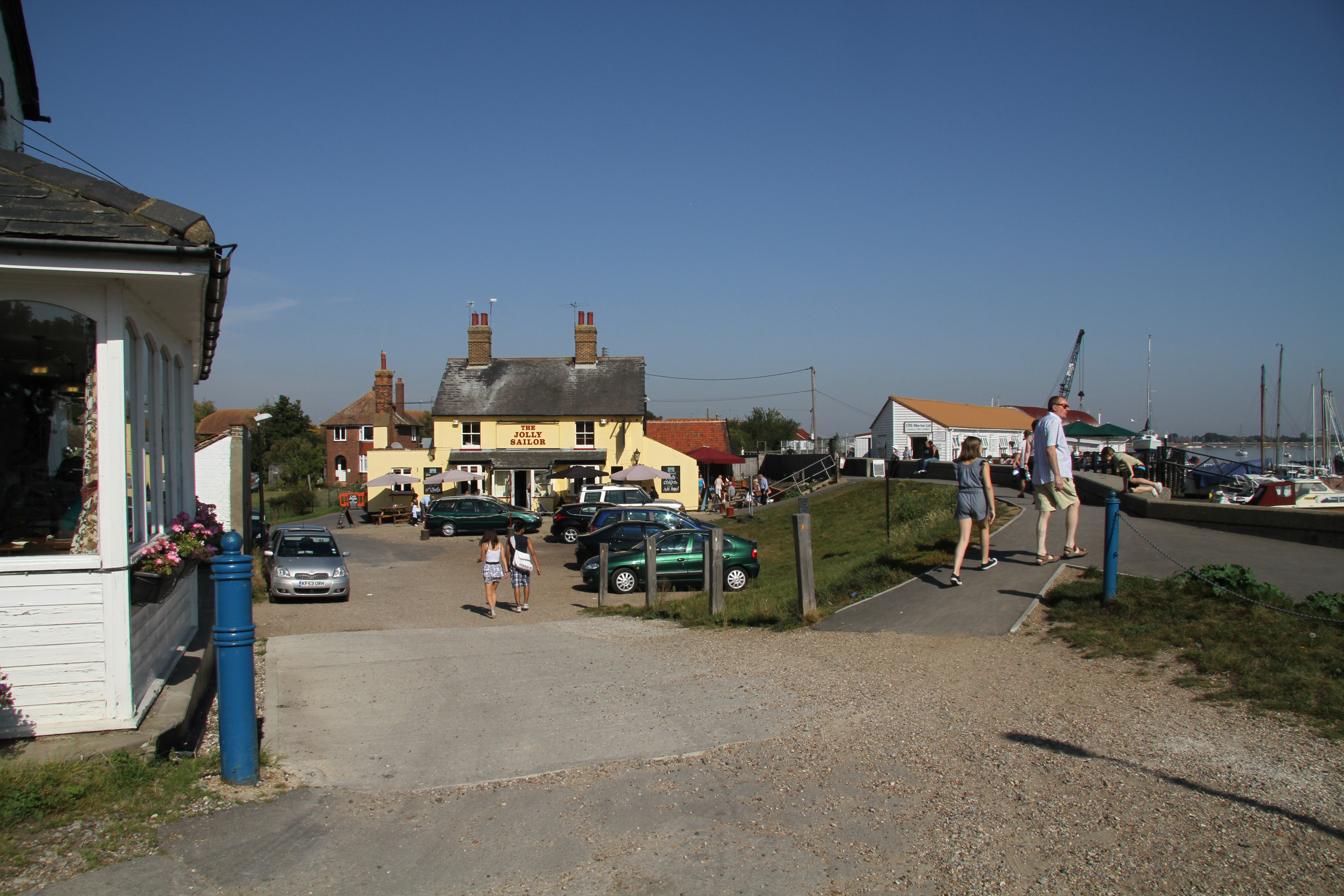

- Location within Essex
- Area: 0.203 km^{2} (0.078 sq mi)
- Population: 596 (Parish, 2021)
  - Density: 2,936/km^{2} (7,600/sq mi)
- Civil parish: Heybridge Basin
- District: Maldon
- Shire county: Essex
- Region: East
- Country: England
- Sovereign state: United Kingdom
- Post town: Maldon
- Postcode district: CM9
- Dialling code: 01245
- Police: Essex
- Fire: Essex
- Ambulance: East of England
- Website: http://www.heybridgebasin.co.uk/

Heybridge Basin is a village and civil parish about 1 mile from Maldon, in the Maldon district, in the county of Essex, England. At the 2021 census the parish had a population of 596. The parish was created in 2020 from part of the parish of Heybridge.

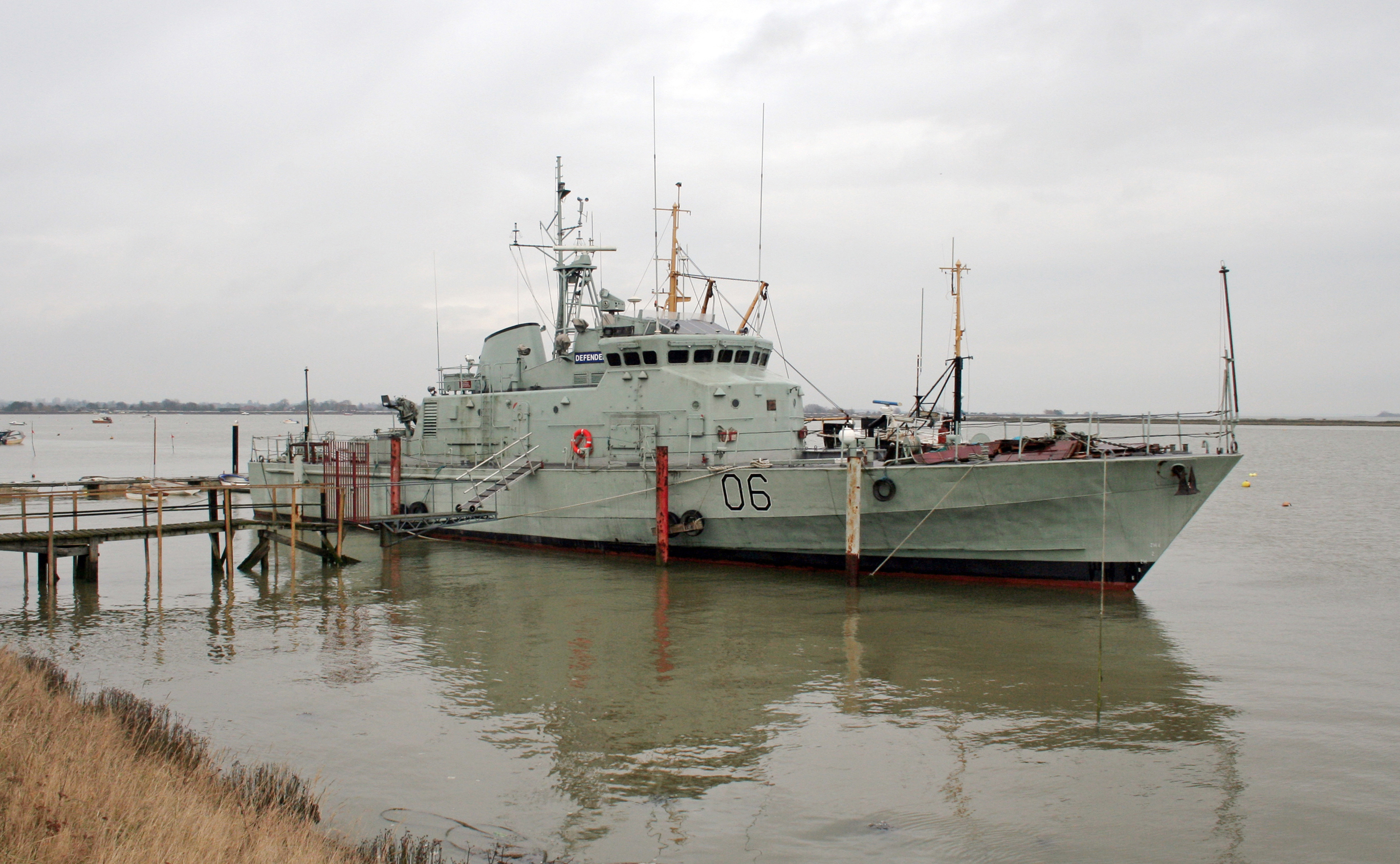
The retired fast attack boat the "Lowestoft Defender" moored in the Blackwater estuary at Heybridge Basin.

Heybridge Basin is where the Chelmer and Blackwater Navigation Canal merges into the tidal Blackwater Estuary, fed by the rivers Blackwater and Chelmer. The two rivers are joined by a lock which is regularly used by pleasure boats. The Basin was constructed in 1796. By 1799 there was a hamlet. Heybridge Basin was designated a conservation area on 21 January 1975. The conservation area has 8 grade II listed buildings.

The Heybridge Basin area was struck by an F0/T1 tornado on 23 November 1981, as part of the record-breaking nationwide tornado outbreak on that day.

== Amenities ==
Heybridge Basin has a church called St George's Church on Basin Road, a pub called The Jolly Sailor on Basin Road and a pub called the Old Ship. There is also a tea room, 'the lock' operated by Wilkin and Sons, the conserves company. The basin offers walks along the seawall and the canal leading back into the heart of Heybridge itself. During the summer months, rowing boat hire is also available.
