= Heybridge, Maldon =

Village in Essex, England

Coordinates: 51.7417°N 0.6897°E

Heybridge
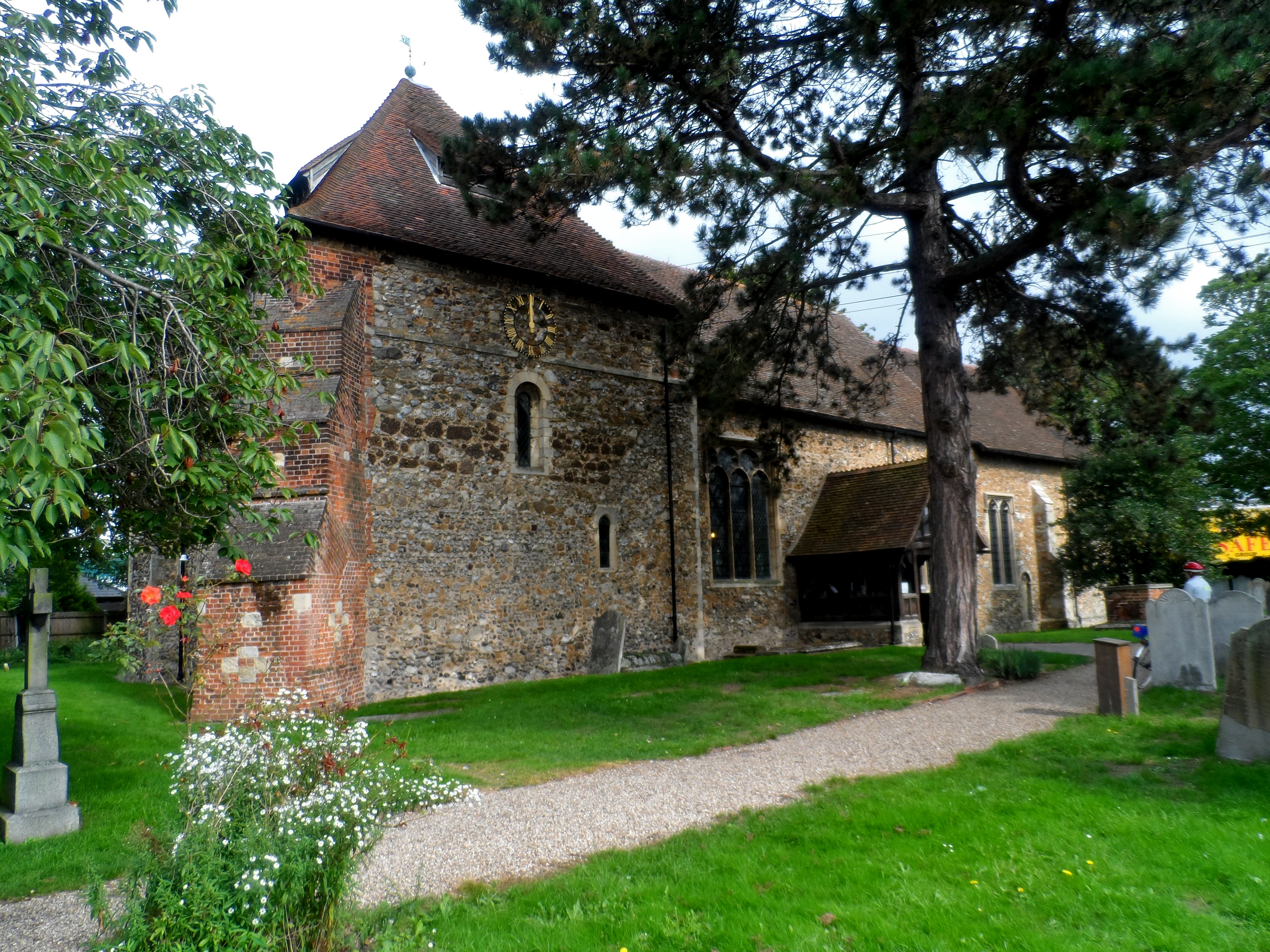
- St Andrews Church, Heybridge

- Location within Essex
- Population: 8,312 (Parish, 2021)
- OS grid reference: TL857081
- Civil parish: Heybridge
- District: Maldon
- Shire county: Essex
- Region: East
- Country: England
- Sovereign state: United Kingdom
- Post town: Maldon
- Postcode district: CM9
- Dialling code: 01621
- Police: Essex
- Fire: Essex
- Ambulance: East of England
- UK Parliament: Maldon

Heybridge is a large village and civil parish in the Maldon district of Essex, England. It is adjacent to the town of Maldon, near the River Blackwater. At the 2021 census the parish had a population of 8,312.

Heybridge has a number of residential areas. Most recognisable is the newer Bovis housing estates to the west of the town, which were built in 1995. Before building commenced, a full archaeological dig was undertaken and the excavations showed the existence of an important Iron Age settlement and ritual complex, a large Roman settlement and a succeeding Saxon settlement, as well as scattered pre-historic remains. Along the Goldhanger road to the east are situated a number of traditional British holiday campsites, catering for both permanent residents and visitors.

== History ==
Heybridge was originally called Tidwalditun. The name Heybridge came from the high bridge that was built over the River Blackwater in the Middle Ages, at Heybridge Square (the junction of Heybridge Street, Holloway Road, and the Causeway). This was a 5-arched stone bridge and it was replaced in 1870 by a 2-arched brick one. Much of the water flow down this part of the river had, by then, been diverted into the River Chelmer by diversion work done during construction of the Chelmer and Blackwater Navigation.

Some people believe that the River Blackwater at Heybridge, near where the "high bridge" was later constructed, was the site of the Battle of Maldon in 991 AD. This belief, however, is contentious. The site of the battle cannot be unambiguously determined from the poem The Battle of Maldon itself, and over the years, various people have had different theories about where it happened. The key role of an island in the poem would seem to make the traditional site of the battle at Northey Island to the south more likely. The island in question is within shouting distance of the mainland, which would rule out Osea Island to the east.

Heybridge was an agricultural village until the 1970s and 80s, when a considerable proportion of the local farm land was given over to house building. The main industry in Heybridge itself, until it ceased trading in 1984, was the agricultural machinery manufacturer E. H. Bentall & Co. William Bentall, some time between 1760 and 1790 invented the Goldhanger plough, which was put on the market in 1797. The company was established in 1805 on the south bank of the Chelmer and Blackwater Navigation, and grew into a large factory complex that operated for nearly 180 years. Prior to the First World War, Bentalls moved into the new world of the Automobile, producing their first car, the Bentall 9hp in 1908, with production ending in 1912.

By 1914 Bentalls had 600–700 employees. During the first world war they took on female workers for the first time, and the workshop was equipped with pneumatic hoists. After the war, though, the fortunes of the company declined – largely due to its involvement in the Agricultural & General Engineers association. After A G E went bust in 1933 Bentalls gradually began to recover.

In 1961 E H Bentall and Co was taken over by the Acrow group. Acrows went into receivership in 1984 and Bentalls factory closed down.

Bentalls started life in the large building which still stands on the canal bank near the corner of Hall Road and Heybridge Street. It expanded across the road, eventually occupying all the land between Heybridge Street and the canal, with the exception of the site of the flour mill at Going's wharf, adjacent to the Wave bridge. In the early 1970s, a new factory complex was built on the other side of the canal, on land where Bentalls had previously had only offices and a foundry, and the land along Heybridge Street was vacated. Today, the Bentalls shopping centre occupies the later site.

== Governance ==
There are three tiers of local government covering Heybridge, at civil parish, district and county level: Heybridge Parish Council, Maldon District Council and Essex County Council. Heybridge Parish Council is based at Plantation Hall, a community centre on Colchester Road.

Heybridge was an ancient parish. In 1931 it had a population of 2,061. The parish was abolished in 1934, with most of the area, including the village, being absorbed into the neighbouring borough of Maldon; a more rural part of the old parish was transferred instead to the neighbouring parish of Great Totham. The borough was in turn abolished in 1974, being replaced by the larger Maldon District. No successor parish was created for the former borough. A new parish of Heybridge was created in 1987 covering the part of the former borough of Maldon north of the River Blackwater. In 2020 a separate parish of Heybridge Basin was created from part of the parish of Heybridge.

Heybridge village is classed as part of the Maldon built up area as defined by the Office for National Statistics.

== Facilities ==
Heybridge's facilities include a number of takeaways, a small supermarket, chemist, vets and dentist; many are situated around the Bentall's Shopping Complex along the Colchester Road. The town is also home to the popular Heybridge Swifts football club, currently competing in the Isthmian League Division One North.

== Chelmer and Blackwater Navigation Canal ==
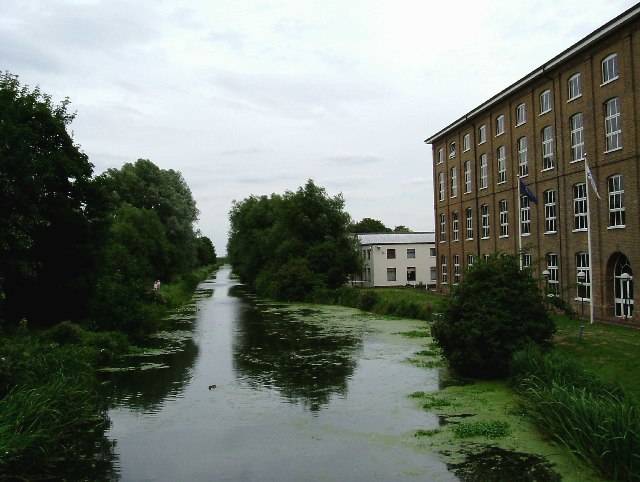
The Chelmer and Blackwater canal at Heybridge

The final stage of the Chelmer and Blackwater Navigation Canal runs from Beeleigh through Heybridge and terminates at Heybridge Basin. This stage of the canal required much planning and work at its inception, as a constant running water supply was needed to the two mills nearby, in Langford and Heybridge. This was achieved through the diversion of the river Blackwater and extensive works around the Beeleigh locks. The Chelmer and Blackwater Navigation Canal was originally used to transport coal & wood to the inland town of Chelmsford, as the direct road via Danbury crests the highest hill in south Essex. The canal was used for this purpose until the late 70s although it had been in steady decline since the Great Eastern Railway opened its lines to Maldon in the 19th century. Today it is mainly used for pleasure boats and fishing.

== Sports and recreation ==
Heybridge has a Non-League football club Heybridge Swifts F.C. who play at Scraley Road.

Heybridge has a King George's Field (or Plantation) in memorial to King George V, which is locally, and colloquially, known as ''the Planny'.

== Notable people ==
Francis Waring (1760–1833) was the vicar of Heybridge. He was notorious for the extraordinary way he performed the duties of his office. He would read church lessons at breakneck speed, give a very quick sermon of one or two sentences and then run down the aisle and leap onto a horse to gallop off and repeat the performance at two other churches in the area.

His domestic arrangements were equally peculiar. Although he wasn't poor, his vicarage was furnished with rough-hewn logs, instead of chairs. His children ate their meals from a trough next to the split-log dining table. He and his wife slept in an enormous wicker cradle suspended from the ceiling.

The Waring Room, St Andrew's church hall, is named after him.

Edward Hammond Bentall (1814–1898) was an industrialist who developed the agricultural machinery manufacturing business established by his father William Bentall (1776–1836) and traded under the name E H Bentall & Co. In 1873 he built a large Italianate house called The Towers at the corner of Goldhanger Road and Colchester Road. The house pioneered concrete block construction and was built with ducted air heating and no fireplaces, although some were added later. The house was demolished in the 1950s. Today the site is occupied by the Towers Estate.

== Freedom of the Parish ==
The following people and military units have received the Freedom of the Parish of Heybridge.

=== Individuals ===
- Barry Harding: 27 September 2025.
- Jean Blair: 27 September 2025.
