= Abbotts Hall Farm =

Nature reserve in Essex, England

Coordinates: 51.796°N 0.845°E

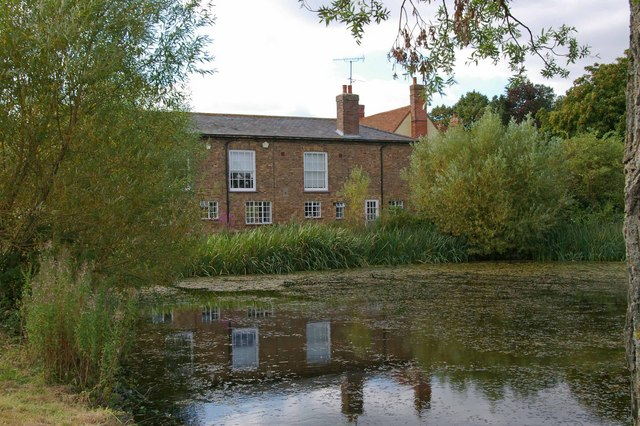
- Interactive map of Abbotts Hall Farm
- Type: Nature reserve
- Location: Great Wigborough, Essex
- OS grid: TL 963 146
- Area: 282 hectares (700 acres)
- Manager: Essex Wildlife Trust

Abbotts Hall Farm is a 282 hectare nature reserve in Great Wigborough in Essex. It is the head office of the Essex Wildlife Trust, which manages the site. It is also part of the Blackwater Estuary National Nature Reserve, Site of Special Scientific Interest, Ramsar site, Special Protection Area and Special Area of Conservation, It is an important archaeological site, and includes a Scheduled Monument, Great Wigborough henge.

This is a working farm which is managed to encourage wildlife. Seawalls have been breached to create marshland, which has many fish, insects, invertebrates and plants which provide food for migrating birds. A new lake has also been constructed, and fields provide additional habitats for fauna such as skylarks.

There is access to some areas and footpaths across others.
