= The Anglo-Saxon Peace Treaty of 991 =

Peace treaty

The Anglo-Saxon peace treaty between Æthelred II of England and the vikings was established following the defeat of the English forces against a viking army at the Battle of Maldon (August 11, 991), after which viking invaders raided and tormented the regions of Kent, Hampshire and western Wessex for a period of four months. The treaty was arranged with the raiders by Sigeric, the Archbishop of Canterbury, and two ealdormen from the West Saxon provinces, known as Aelfric and Æthelweard. The treaty indicates that the most influential leader of the vikings was Olaf Tryggvason, who would later go on to become king of Norway.

The treaty declared that the vikings would keep the peace towards the king and his people and assist them against any other viking forces who attacked England, in return for provisions and the sum of £10,000. This payment took the form of 'Danegeld', a tax raised to lessen the threat of viking attacks, and had been in use since the time of Alfred the Great. It was also not uncommon for rulers to deal with threats of this kind by employing foreign raiders to protect the king, his land and people against all other enemies. The battle and payment of Danegeld is noted in the Anglo-Saxon Chronicle, which states:

Here Ealdormen Bryhtnoth was killed at Maldon, and in the same year it was decided that tax be paid to the Danish men because of the enormities which they wrought along the sea coast. That was at first ten thousand pounds.

This treaty also set out the regulations for the treatment of merchants and their ships that fell into the power of either parties, the rules for settling disputes between the Englishmen and vikings and declared that all wrongdoings that took place before the treaty was signed would be forgotten. This agreement has been referred to by the historian Thomas Kendrick as a 'cowardly and ill-omened pact', which was the 'first bribe...that openly revealed the English king as a weakling'. The treaty appears to have been largely ineffective, as a similar issue and agreement occurred in 994. The sustained policy of paying large amounts of money to raiders, to stem the threat of viking attacks in England, is likely one of the reasons King Æthelred II earned himself the moniker 'the Unready', from the Old English tern 'unraed', meaning 'bad policy'.
