= Museum of Power =

Industrial museum in Langford, Essex, England

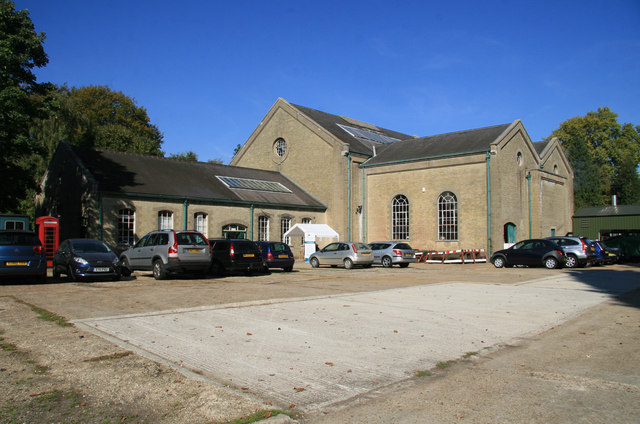
- The museum building

- Location within Essex
- Location: Langford, Maldon
- Coordinates: 51°45′03″N 0°39′18″E
- Type: Industrial
- Key holdings: Steam pumping engine

The Museum of Power is located in the former Southend Waterworks (now Essex and Suffolk Water) Langford Pumping Station in Langford, Essex, England. It is on the B1019, on the main road from Maldon to Hatfield Peverel.

== History ==
Langford Pumping Station was built by Thomas and Charles Hawksley between 1924 and 1927, opening in 1929. It continued pumping fresh (treated) water using steam engines until 31 October 1963, when electric pumps took over. It is designed to extract water from the Rivers Chelmer, Ter, and Blackwater. The three inflows merge in a small settling reservoir, where sediment is naturally deposited, and then pumped for treatment, and again to a storage reservoir. Two of the three engines and the boilers and coaling plant were scrapped in 1963, and the octagonal chimney was demolished in 1966.

The pump house buildings and the remaining engine were declared scheduled monuments in 1986 and also received engineering heritage listed status from the Institution of Mechanical Engineers in 2012 as a result of the return to steam.

== Museum ==
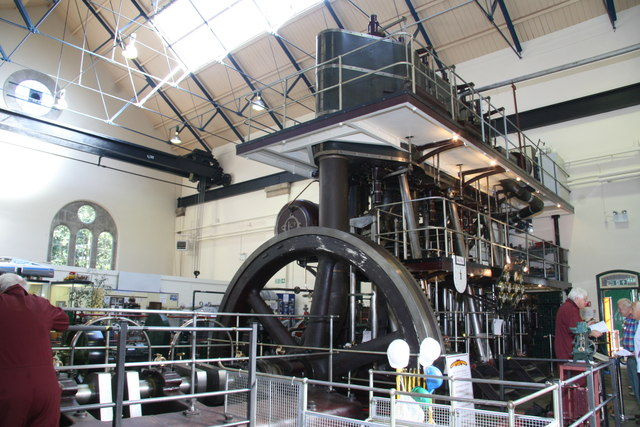
A steam engine at the museum

The surviving engine, Marshall, and pump set has been preserved and restored to operating condition by the museum's volunteers in 2011, and the museum operates the pump 6 days annually. The engine, built by the Lilleshall Company of Oakengates in Shropshire, is a triple-expansion steam engine built in 1931 and numbered 282. Museum research shows that 'Marshall' was the last triple-expansion engine to be built by the Lilleshall Company and is the only one of its kind in the UK still in its original location, with its original pump sets.

The museum operates the Langford and Beeleigh Miniature Railway, which offers passenger rides around the museum, as well as Astaria, the only model village in Essex. The museum hosts major events such as the Easter Transport Fest, Classic Vehicle & Vintage Show, American Car Show, and Bike Meet, which see a large array of visiting vintage cars, motorbikes, and American and custom vehicles on display. It is also the home of Essex's major steampunk event, which takes place every September.

== See also ==
- Internal Fire Museum of Power, a museum of internal combustion engines in West Wales
- Prickwillow Museum
- Stretham Old Engine
- Cambridge Museum of Technology
