= River Ter SSSI =

Protected area in Essex, England

Coordinates: 51.813°N 0.52°E

River Ter
- Site of Special Scientific Interest
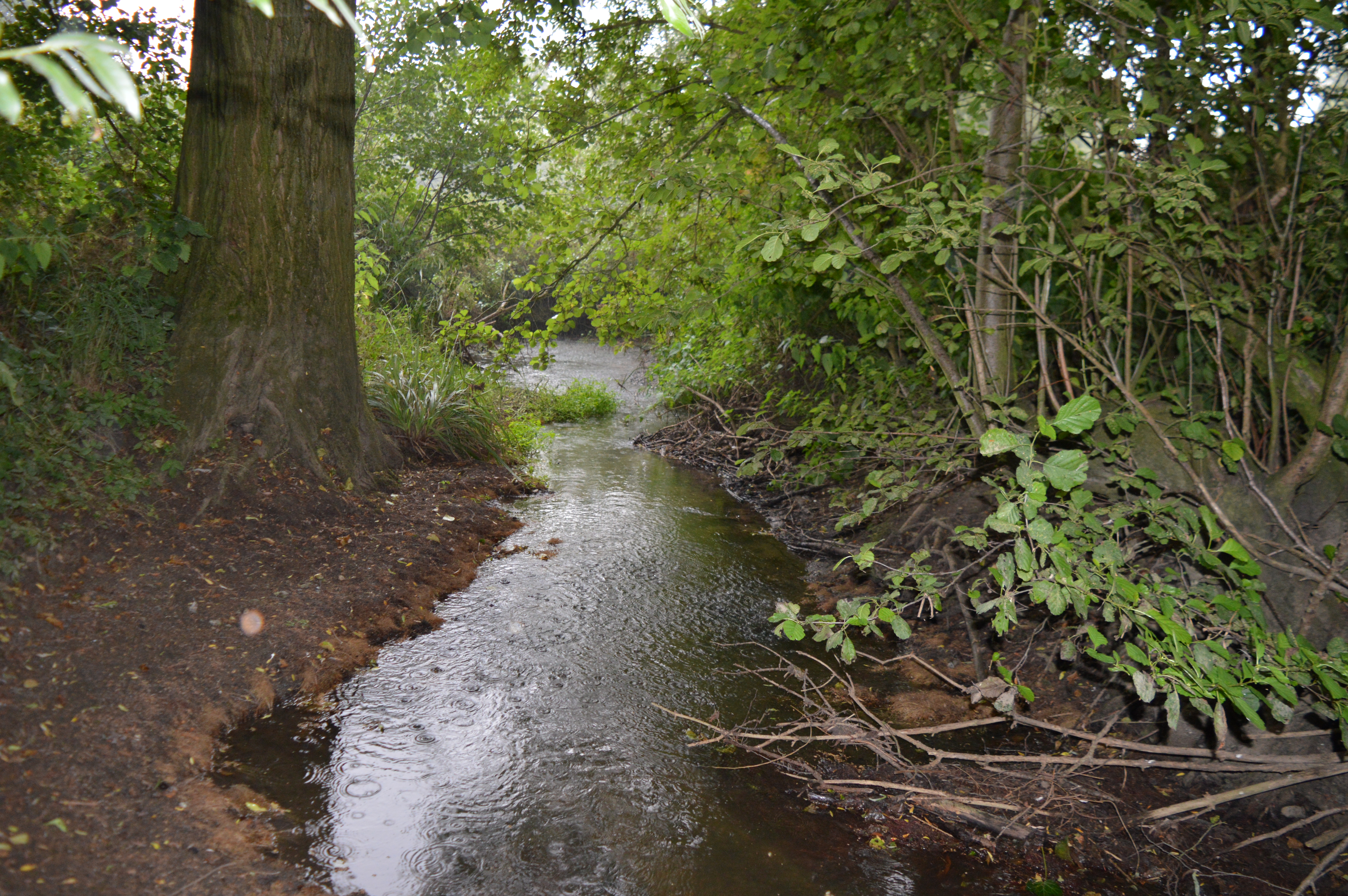
- Location of River Ter.
- Area of search: Essex
- Grid reference: TL738157
- Interest: Geological
- Area: 6.4 ha (16 acres)
- Notification date: 1994
- Location map: Magic Map

The River Ter SSSI is a stretch of the River Ter and its banks south of Great Leighs in Essex which has been designated a geological Site of Special Scientific Interest. It is a Geological Conservation Review site.

According to the Natural England citation:

This reach of the River Ter is representative of a lowland stream with a distinctive floor regime. It is flashy, draining a low-lying catchment on glacial till, and has a very low base flow discharge but high flood peaks; daily, monthly and annual flow variability are also high. In addition the site demonstrates characteristic features of a lowland stream including pool-riffle sequences, bank erosion, bedload transport and dimensional adjustments to flooding frequency.

Most of the river is inaccessible as it is surrounded by dense vegetation, but a footpath runs through an area of the north bank, east of the road called Cole Hill, which is within the SSSI.
