= Bentall (surname) =

Bentall is a surname. Notable people with the surname include:

- Barney Bentall (born 1956), Canadian pop/rock singer-songwriter
- Edward Hammond Bentall (1814–1898), English manufacturer of ploughs and agricultural equipment, and politician
- Frank Bentall, founder of the British department store chain Bentalls
- Hugh Bentall (1920–2012), British surgeon who pioneered open-heart surgery
- Richard Bentall (born 1956), British professor of clinical psychology
- Ruby Bentall (born 1988), English actress
