= Edward Bentall (footballer) =

English footballer

Personal information
- Full name: Charles Edward Bentall
- Date of birth: 28 January 1922
- Place of birth: Helmsley, North Riding of Yorkshire, England
- Date of death: 10 December 1947 (aged 25)
- Position: Half-back

Senior career*
Years	Team	Apps	(Gls)
- English Martyrs
1945–1947	York City	1	(0)
Total		1	(0)
- * Club domestic league appearances and goals

Charles Edward Bentall (28 January 1922 – 10 December 1947), known as Edward Bentall, was an English professional footballer who played as a half-back in the Football League for York City, in non-League football for English Martyrs, and in wartime football for York. He died from tuberculosis at the age of 25 on 10 December 1947.
