= Northey Island =

Tidal island in the estuary of the River Blackwater, Essex

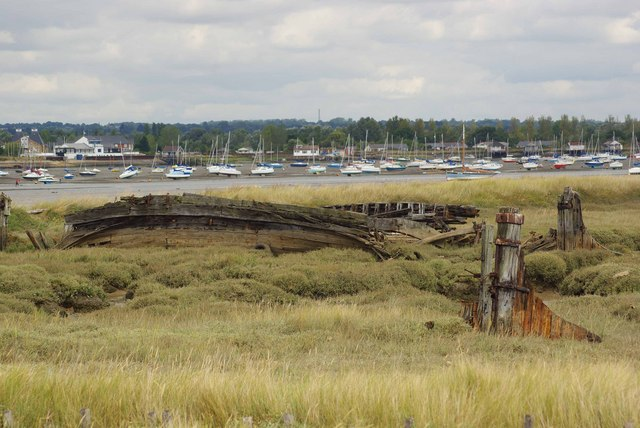
- The remains of a pair of Thames barges on Northey Island

- Location within Essex

Geography
- Location: Blackwater Estuary
- Coordinates: 51.72°N 0.72°E
- Length: 1.5 km (0.93 mi)
- Width: 1.5 km (0.93 mi)

Administration
- England
- County: Essex
- Borough: Maldon

Northey Island is an island in the estuary of the River Blackwater, Essex. It is linked to the south bank of the river by a causeway, covered for up to 3 hours either side of high tide. The island is approximately 1 mile (2 km) to the east of Maldon, Essex and 1 mile (2 km) to the west of Osea Island.

The island is owned by the National Trust.

The Battle of Maldon, 991 is believed to have taken place on the causeway and the south bank of the Blackwater near the island. At that time the causeway is thought to have been half as long as it is presently – 120 yards rather than 240 yards today.

Significant land reclamation was carried out by the Dutch contractor Nicholas Van Cropenrough in the early 18th century; he unwalled marshland to significantly enlarge the island but the walls were breached by the sea and the land returned to marshland on 29 November 1897.

In 1923 Northey was bought by the writer and campaigner Norman Angell.

The island is part of the Blackwater Estuary Site of Special Scientific Interest. Northey is home to diverse birdlife and this is reflected in the place name 'Awl Creek' which perpetuates the traditional Essex dialect word for the avocet.

At one time Northey was home to more species than it is now. The island was one of the last southern strongholds of the raven, the last bird being taken from the Ladies grove in 1888.

It is one of 43 (unbridged) tidal islands which can be walked to from the British mainland and one of six such tidal islands in Essex.
