= Bentall Building =

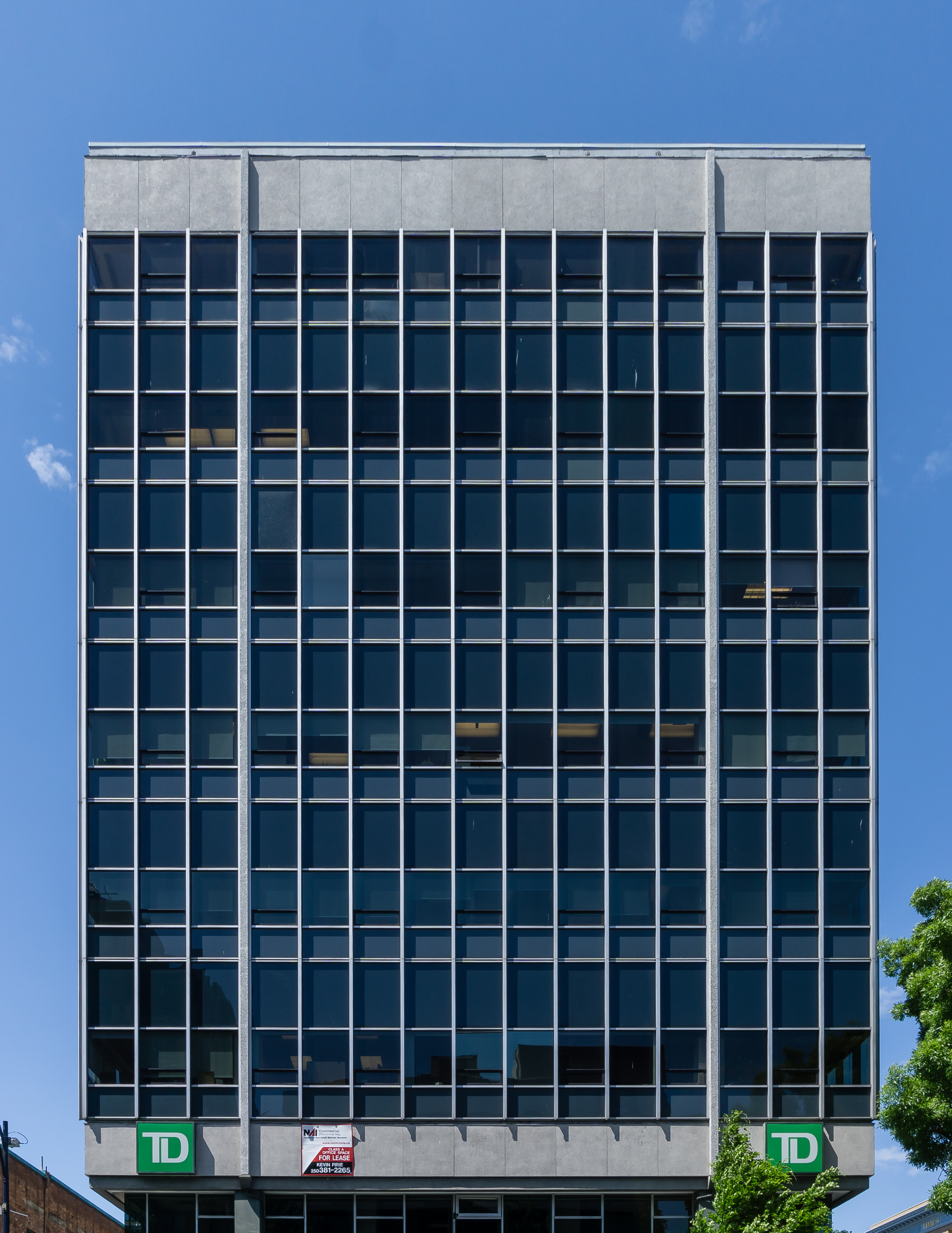
- The building's exterior in 2018
- Interactive map of the Bentall Building area

General information
- Location: 1060 Douglas St., Victoria, British Columbia, Canada
- Coordinates: 48.4244°N 123.3658°W

The Bentall Building is an historic building in Victoria, British Columbia, Canada. It is located at the intersection of Douglas and Fort Streets.

== See also ==
- List of historic places in Victoria, British Columbia
