= Blackwater Estuary =

Estuary in Essex, England

Coordinates: 51.722°N 0.744°E

- Site of Special Scientific Interest
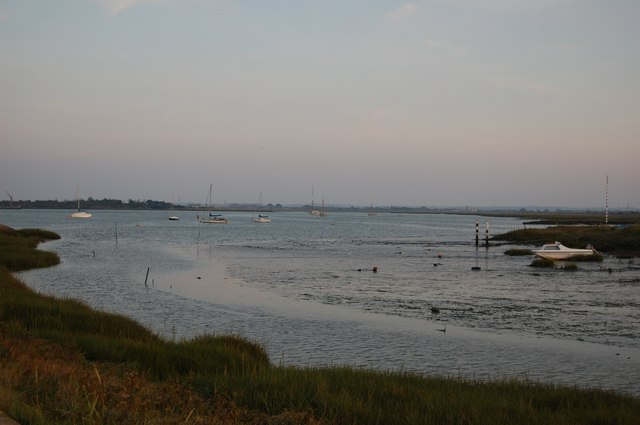
- Location of Blackwater Estuary.
- Area of search: Essex
- Grid reference: TL940070
- Interest: Biological
- Area: 5,538.0 ha (13,685 acres)
- Notification date: 1993
- Location map: Magic Map

Designations

Ramsar Wetland
- Official name: Blackwater Estuary
- Designated: 11 March 1992
- Reference no.: 543

The Blackwater Estuary is the estuary of the River Blackwater between Maldon and West Mersea in Essex, England. It is a 5,538 hectare biological Site of Special Scientific Interest (SSSI). An area of 4,395 hectares is also designated a Ramsar Wetland of International Importance, and a Special Protection Area 1,099 hectares is a National Nature Reserve. Tollesbury Wick and part of Abbotts Hall Farm, both nature reserve managed by the Essex Wildlife Trust, are in the SSSI.

Oysters have been harvested from the estuary for more than a thousand years and there are remains of fish weirs from the Anglo-Saxon era. At the head of the estuary is the town of Maldon, which is a centre of salt production. The other major settlement is the town West Mersea, of Mersea Island, on the northern seaward side. Numerous other villages are on its banks.

Within the estuary is Northey Island which was the location for the first experiments in the UK in 'managed retreat', i.e. creating saltmarsh by setting sea walls back from what are perceived to be unsustainable positions.

== Birds ==
The area is notable as a breeding area for little tern (Sternula albifrons) and as a transit point for ringed plover (Charadrius hiaticula).

Overwintering bird species who use the area include:

- Pied avocet (Recurvirostra avosetta)
- Black-tailed godwit (Limosa limosa islandica)
- Dark-bellied brent goose (Branta bernicla bernicla)
- Dunlin (Calidris alpina alpina)
- Eurasian golden plover (Pluvialis apricaria)
- Grey plover (Pluvialis squatarola)
- Hen harrier (Circus cyaneus)
- Common redshank (Tringa totanus)
- Ringed plover (Charadrius hiaticula)
- Ruff (Philomachus pugnax)
- Common shelduck (Tadorna tadorna)

The estuary is also the current mooring location for the radio ship MV Ross Revenge, the home of former pirate station Radio Caroline.

== See also ==
- Osea Island
- Pewet Island
