= Edward Hammond Bentall =

Edward Hammond Bentall (19 June 1814 – 7 August 1898) was an English designer of ploughs and agricultural equipment and a Liberal politician who sat in the House of Commons from 1868 to 1874.

Bentall was the son of William Bentall, of Goldhanger, Essex, and his wife Mary Hammond, daughter of Edward Hammond, of Sible Hedingham, Essex. His father was a ploughmaker who developed a business making agricultural implements. Bentall was educated at private schools at Maldon and Brentwood and at the age of 22 went into his father's business as an engineer. He grew the business at the works at Heybridge, Maldon, Essex and in 1839 established the company as E. H. Bentall & Co. He was captain commanding the 1st Essex Engineer Volunteers.

At the 1868 general election Bentall was elected Member of Parliament for Maldon. He held the seat until 1874.

In 1873 Bentall built a large Italianate house called The Towers at the corner of Goldhanger Road and Colchester Road at Heybridge. The house pioneered concrete block construction and was built with ducted air heating and no fireplaces, although some were added later. The house was demolished in the 1950s Bentall died at the age of 84.

Bentall married Susannah Julia Woodgate, daughter of William Woodgate of Broomfield Hall, Essex in 1846. His son Edmund Ernest Bentall took over the business.

Parliament of the United Kingdom
| Preceded by Ralph Earle; George Peacocke | Member of Parliament for Maldon; 1868–1874 | Succeeded by George Sandford |
