= Chelmer and Blackwater Navigation =

Canalisation of two English rivers

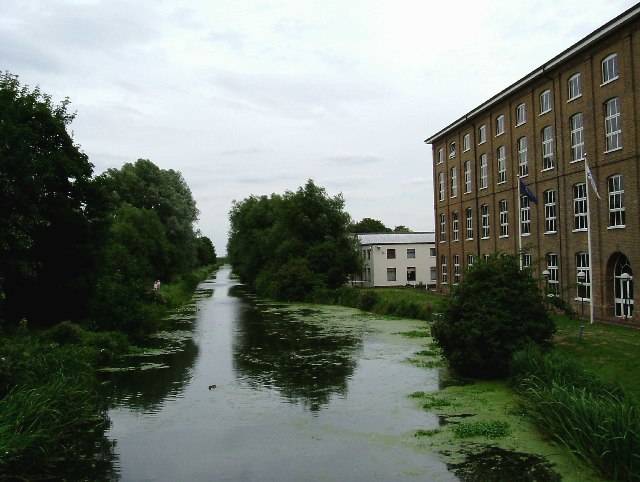
- The Navigation from Colchester Road, Maldon
- Interactive map of Chelmer and Blackwater Navigation

Specifications
- Length: 13.75 miles (22.13 km)
- Maximum boat length: 60 ft 0 in (18.29 m)
- Maximum boat beam: 16 ft 0 in (4.88 m)
- Locks: 12
- Status: Navigable
- Navigation authority: Essex Waterways

History
- Original owner: Chelmer and Blackwater Navigation Co
- Principal engineer: John Rennie
- Other engineer: Richard Coates
- Date of act: 1793
- Date completed: 1797

Geography
- Start point: Chelmsford
- End point: Heybridge, Maldon
- Connects to: Blackwater estuary

The Chelmer and Blackwater Navigation is the canalisation of the Rivers Chelmer and Blackwater in Essex, in the east of England. The navigation runs for 13.75 miles (22.13 km) from Springfield Basin in Chelmsford to the sea lock at Heybridge Basin near Maldon. Initial plans faced spirited opposition from Maldon, which were overcome by avoiding the town and terminating at Heybridge, and the navigation opened in 1797. There were some teething problems, and the engineer John Rennie was called back on two occasions to recommend improvements. The impact of the railways was less severe than on many canals, as there was never a direct line between Chelmsford and Maldon. The sea lock at Heybridge was enlarged after the Second World War, but trade gradually declined and ceased in 1972.

Unlike most canals, it was not nationalised in 1948, and remained under the control of the original company. The first leisure boats to use the navigation did so in 1973, when the Inland Waterways Association organised a rally at Chelmsford. Springfield Basin was restored in 1992, but the proprietors faced bankruptcy in 2003, and after two years of negotiation, Essex Waterways Ltd, a wholly owned subsidiary of the Inland Waterways Association, took over responsibility for management, although the proprietors retained ownership.

Because Essex and Suffolk Water abstracts water from the navigation to supply Hanningfield Reservoir, it has a statutory obligation to maintain the outer gates at Heybridge sea lock, to prevent salt water entering the drinking water supply. The company undertook major refurbishment work at the lock during the winters of 2016/17 and 2017/18, including replacement of the outer sea gate with a new design. A long-standing ambition, first proposed in 1985, has been to provide a better destination at Chelmsford, by providing access for boats to the town centre. A proposed link from Springfield Basin was thwarted by road building in the area, but a plan to replace the automatic weir below Chelmsford Town Centre with a new structure incorporating a navigation lock was recommended in 2020.

== Route ==
The navigation runs from Springfield Basin in Chelmsford to the sea lock at Heybridge Basin near Maldon. It has six bridges and drops 75 feet (23 m) through 12 locks from the basin to the sea. There is also a set of flood gates at Beeleigh, which prevents water from the River Blackwater flooding the cut to Heybridge Basin. The navigation meanders in a broadly west to east direction between Chelmsford and Maldon, through countryside which is largely arable, and although it passes near to a number of villages, all of them are set back some distance from the waterway.

== History ==
Prior to the actual construction of the navigation, there had been almost 120 years of proposals for such a scheme, and opposition from the port of Maldon, which anticipated that its revenues would fall if vessels could travel to Chelmsford. The first such scheme was proposed in 1677 by Andrew Yarranton, who published his idea in a work entitled England's Improvements by Sea and Land. Maldon objected and the scheme came to nothing. In July 1733, John Hore, who was involved in the Kennet, Stroudwater, and the Avon Navigation at Bristol, proposed two schemes, one to make the river navigable, and another to create a new cut between Chelmsford and Maldon. Despite the projected extra costs for a canal, Hore favoured the canal scheme, as he believed there would be less objection from the millers along the river route. Maldon again objected on commercial grounds, and the scheme was dropped.

River Chelmer Navigation Act 1766
- Act of Parliament
- Parliament of Great Britain
- Long title: An Act for making the River Chelmer navigable, from the Port of Maldon to the Town of Chelmsford, in the Country of Essex.
- Citation: 6 Geo. 3. c. 101
- Territorial extent: Great Britain

Dates
- Royal assent: 6 June 1766
- Commencement: 17 December 1765 (Note: Start of session.)
Other legislation
Relates to	Chelmsford and Blackwater Canal Act 1793

Status: Current legislation

Text of statute as originally enacted

The next schemes were proposed in 1762, when the canal engineers John Smeaton and Thomas Yeoman both carried out surveys for a possible route. Yeoman produced a second plan in 1765, and this was presented to Parliament. Yeoman had a high standing as a civil engineer, and the opponents to the scheme tried to engage a suitable engineer to counter the proposal, but many of the obvious choices, including James Brindley, declined because they were too busy. Eventually, Ferdinando and William Stratford took on the task, but both caught ague and fever, from which Ferdinando died, while William was ill for a year but then recovered. An act of Parliament to authorise the plan, the River Chelmer Navigation Act 1766 (6 Geo. 3. c. 101), was passed on 6 June 1766, with the stipulation that the work must be completed within 12 years, and that no work could start until 25 per cent of the capital had been raised. The scheme foundered because the required capital had not been subscribed.

Chelmsford and Blackwater Canal Act 1793
- Act of Parliament
- Parliament of Great Britain
- Long title: An Act for making and maintaining a Navigable Communication between the Town of Chelmsford or some Part of the Parish of Springfield, in the County of Essex, and a Place called Collier's Reach, in or near the River Blackwater, in the said County.
- Citation: 33 Geo. 3. c. 93
- Territorial extent: Great Britain

Dates
- Royal assent: 17 June 1793
- Commencement: 17 June 1793 (Note: The Acts of Parliament (Commencement) Act 1793.)
Other legislation
Relates to	River Chelmer Navigation Act 1766

Status: Current legislation

Text of statute as originally enacted

Peter Muilman, a Dutch merchant living in London (and the father of Richard) called a meeting in Chelmsford on 2 October 1772, to propose improvements to the river, but a subsequent meeting decided that a new cut would be a better solution. Muilman announced that this scheme would probably not require any locks, and advocated that he should build it once Robert Whitworth had surveyed it, but nothing came of this. Finally in 1792, with navigations in other parts of the country bringing increased prosperity to the towns they served, the people of Chelmsford decide to avoid the opposition of Maldon by bypassing it, and terminating the navigation at Heybridge, on the River Blackwater below Maldon. Under the direction of John Rennie Charles Wedge surveyed the route in 1792 and Matthew Hall surveyed it in 1793. The new route would increase the length of the navigation by about 2 miles (3.2 km), but this plan formed the basis of a parliamentary bill. Despite spirited opposition by Maldon, the bill became an act of Parliament, the Chelmsford and Blackwater Canal Act 1793 (33 Geo. 3. c. 93), on 17 June 1793, creating The Company of the Proprietors of the Chelmer and Blackwater Navigation, with powers to raise £40,000 by the issuing of shares, and a further £20,000 if required. Work started soon afterwards, and although John Rennie was officially chief engineer, the project was managed by Richard Coates, who had also assisted Rennie on the Ipswich and Stowmarket Navigation. The grave of Richard Coates stands in Springfield churchyard, while Rennie's original survey book for the canal has been preserved.

The port of Maldon now tried to mitigate their loss, and with advice from Benjamin Latrobe, produced a plan to improve the Blackwater through Maldon to its junction with the Chelmer at Beeleigh, which was submitted to Parliament in 1793. Realising that this would make the final cut to Heybridge redundant, the navigation company opposed the bill, and it was defeated. Latrobe submitted a revised scheme in April 1795, which was also defeated. This marked the end of his engineering career in Britain, as he emigrated to America shortly afterwards. Work continued on the navigation, with the first section from Heybridge Basin to Little Baddow opening in April 1796 and the navigation opening throughout on 3 June 1797. The final cost was around £50,000.

== Operation ==
When completed, the length of the navigation was 13.8 miles (22.2 km). 12 locks lowered the level of the navigation by 75 feet (23 m) from Springfield Basin in Chelmsford to the sea lock at Heybridge Basin. An additional stop lock protected the new cut from flooding at Beeleigh. Here, the navigation left the course of the River Chelmer, and joined that of the River Blackwater, before entering the final 2.5 miles (4.0 km) of cut to Heybridge Basin. The waters of the River Blackwater were diverted into the Chelmer, flowing over a weir between Beeleigh Lock and the stop gates. The navigation was constructed with only 2 feet (0.61 m) of water, which was the lowest statutory draught for any of the English commercial waterways. The maximum headroom is 6 feet 3 inches (1.91 m). The locks were constructed to take barges which were 60 by 16 feet (18.3 by 4.9 m) and each could carry around 25 tons. They were horse-drawn, and remained so until the 1960s, when diesel outboard motors were fitted. The only branch was a cut to Langford Mill, built privately by Mr Westcomb. It was well used until the 1870s, but was unused after 1881.

A community developed around Heybridge Basin, with Richard Tovee, a sawyer by trade, and Thomas Malden, a coal merchant, both buying plots of land to further their trade. The Navigation Company built a granary, which was used to store perishable goods, while rope-makers and boat builders also established themselves nearby. Soon a pub and a brewery appeared, and the settlement steadily grew in size.

The Navigation experienced some teething problems, with floods in 1797 creating shoals which prevented the passage of barges. These got steadily worse, until Rennie was called back in 1799 to address the problem. Rennie was again recalled in 1805, when the mill owners complained about leakage through the locks and requested damages. Further improvements were made, including the rebuilding of Heybridge sea lock by James Green, and trade developed steadily. The first inland gasworks in Britain was built in Chelmsford in 1819, using coal brought up the navigation. Besides coal, bricks, stone, timber and general cargo was carried from Heybridge to Chelmsford, and the major cargo in the reverse direction was grain and flour. Local wharfs served the communities of Little Baddow, Boreham, Ulting and Heybridge. At its peak in the mid 19th century, the canal was carrying over 60,000 tons of cargo per year.

=== Locks ===
The twelve locks on the navigation are:

Locks on the Chelmer and Blackwater Navigation
Lock name	Lock number	Fall (or rise) of lock, feet & inches (metres)	OS Grid Ref	Distance from Springfield Basin, miles (km)
Springfield Lock	1	3’ 9” (1.14 m)	TL716063	0.3 (0.5 km)
Barnes Mill Lock	2	5’ 6” (1.68 m)	TL729064	1.0 (1.6 km)
Sandford Mill Lock	3	7’ 0” (2.13 m)	TL739063	1.9 (3.1 km)
Cuton Lock	4	4’ 0” (1.22 m)	TL743077	2.85 (4.6 km)
Stoneham's Lock	5	5’ 0” (1.52 m)	TL752082	3.75 (6.0 km)
Little Baddow Mill Lock	6	6’ 0” (1.82 m)	TL758083	4.4 (7.1 km)
Paper Mill Lock	7	6’ 4” (1.93 m)	TL776089	5.7 (9.2 km)
Rushe's Lock	8	6’ 3” (1.91 m)	TL795089	7.1 (11.4 km)
Hoe Mill Lock	9	8’ 3” (2.51 m)	TL807083	8.2 (13.2 km)
Rickett's Lock	10	6’ 0” (1.83 m)	TL827087	9.4 (15.1 km)
Beeleigh Lock	11	5’ 6” (1.68 m)	TL838083	10.3 (16.6 km)
Beeleigh flood gate	–	–	TL840083	10.4 (16.7 km)
Heybridge Sea Lock	12	14’ 10” (4.52 m)	TL871068	13.75 (22.1 km)

== Decline ==
The Eastern Counties Railway reached Chelmsford in 1843, and a branch line from Witham reached Maldon in 1848, but there was never a direct line between the two towns. Although trade declined, the impact of the railways was less significant than on many canals. Following the Second World War, the sea lock into Heybridge Basin was extended to 107 by 26 feet (32.6 by 7.9 m), so that coasters carrying timber from the continent could enter the basin to transfer their cargo to barges. Traffic slowly declined until the last load of timber was delivered to Browns Yard (now Travis Perkins) on Springfield Basin in 1972. Although commercial traffic ceased, the navigation continued to derive income from water abstraction and from the sale of wood from the willows which grow along the banks. The willow is used for making cricket bats, and the trees were first planted in the 1880s when one of the directors saw the need for alternative sources of income.

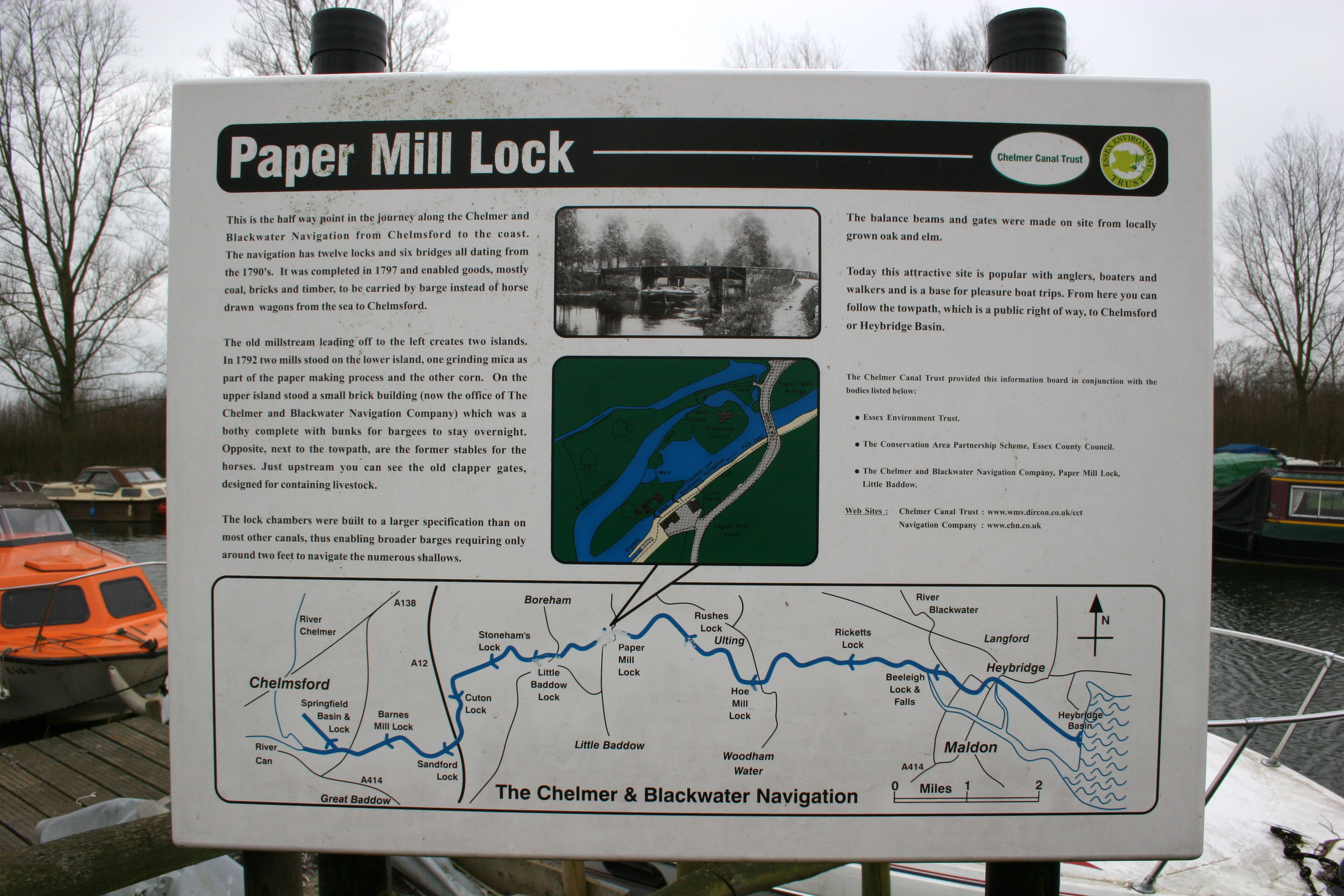
Sign at Paper Mill Lock

The navigation is unusual in that it was not nationalised in 1948 when most of the other waterways in the UK were, and remained under the control of the original Company of Proprietors of the Chelmer & Blackwater Navigation Ltd.

== Leisure era ==
Prior to the cessation of commercial traffic in 1972, pleasure craft were prohibited from using the locks, and for a short period, the only boats to use the navigation were the company work boats and canoes. Leisure boats used the navigation for the first time in 1973, when the Inland Waterways Association (IWA) organised a rally at Kings Head Meadow, Chelmsford. Subsequently, leisure boats were moored at Paper Mill Lock and Hoe Mill Lock. Springfield Basin became unusable after the gates were damaged by vandals in the late 1970s, and gradually silted up. The basin was restored to use in 1992, when the IWA co-ordinated various bodies to undertake the work. The National Rivers Authority dredged the basin, Essex County Council repaired the lock bridge, riparian owners repaired wharves, and members of the IWA and the Waterway Recovery Group repaired the lock and the feeder system to the basin. A boat rally was held in 1993, and the project won the "Shell Best of Britain Award."

The construction of housing and restaurants around the Springfield Basin site took place, including Coates Quay and Waterfront Place, which meant that the basin became accessible to the public for the first time, and Lockside Marina was built just above Springfield Lock. However, the navigation company was unable to pay its way, and went into administration in 2003. Although British Waterways were approached, they declined to take over the navigation. After negotiations with the administrator, the Inland Waterways Association (IWA) signed a maintenance and operating agreement in November 2005 to take over responsibility for the running of the navigation through a wholly owned subsidiary called Essex Waterways Ltd.

While Essex Waterways manage the navigation from day to day, it is still owned by the Company of Proprietors. The towpath from Maldon to Chelmsford has been designated as a public footpath, and is maintained in good order. Narrow boats can be hired from Paper Mill lock, and the infrastructure is being steadily upgraded. Access to the navigation from the River Blackwater is only possible at certain states of the tide, and advance booking to use the sea lock is required. Almost the entire canal is now a conservation area, after Chelmsford so designated the part within their jurisdiction in 1991, and Maldon and Braintree district councils took similar action subsequently.

On 18 February 2016, the Chelmsford Civic Society held a meeting at the Essex Record Office to consider the option of extending the canal from Springfield Basin to a new destination nearer to the town centre. Over 100 people attended the meeting, at which the idea of a new 180-yard (160 m) cut from the basin was aired. The cut would avoid a weir and low bridge to rejoin the river system where the River Can and Chelmer merge, and a new waterside area would be constructed in the town centre. Although the leader of the council actively opposed the concept, the idea of a better destination for the navigation had been a long-standing dream, having first been proposed in 1985 in a report by the IWA, and embraced by the council in 2002. The link was downgraded to an "aspiration" following a 2008 planning enquiry, although it remained on the town centre development plans, and the replacement Essex Record Office building was sited so that it would overlook the link. The link ceased to be a favoured option in 2020, after decisions to build a new link road between Parkway and the site of the old gas works, which was being redeveloped as housing.

An alternative would be to use the course of the Chelmer. Navigation is prevented by a large weir structure, which was installed in the 1960s as part of a flood defence scheme. Its principal function is to maintain water levels in the rivers within the city, which would otherwise become muddy ditches at some times of the year. Since 1995, it had been maintained by the Environment Agency, but they decided that they could no longer justify the costs of maintaining the structure, which consists of two radial gates at either side of a central tilting gate, with a control building on the north bank of the river. Chelmsford City Council commissioned a feasibility study, which proposed that the automatic gates could be replaced, and a navigation lock built alongside the new structure, on the north side of the river. It is estimated that the project would take two years to complete at a cost of around £6 million, much of which would be provided by Community Infrastructure Levy money, from the housing developments taking place in the vicinity. Some 970 new homes are expected to be provided in the Chelmsford Waterside neighbourhood, and the council has obtained a grant of £10.7 million from the government's Housing Infrastructure Fund, enabling it to address issues of access, contamination of the land, and the presence of gas mains which currently hinder the development.

Much of the maintenance is carried out by local volunteers as well as volunteers from Waterway Recovery Group, which is also part of the IWA. Regular working parties help to keep the waterway, including the towpath, locks and other structures well maintained, and many of the recent improvements have been undertaken by the volunteers. In February 2016, the two groups worked together to upgrade 700 yards (640 m) of towpath near Papermill Lock, where a section of muddy towpath was given an all-weather surface by using 150 tons of road planings. The material was donated by Essex Highways, after it had been removed from roads during resurfacing work.

=== Heybridge Sea Lock ===
The navigation is connected to the tidal River Blackwater by Heybridge Sea Lock. Its maintenance is unusual, in that the Northumbrian Water Group has a statutory obligation to maintain the mitre gates and the sea gate at the eastern end of the lock. The construction of Hanningfield Reservoir was authorised in 1950 as a joint project between Southend Waterworks Company and the South Essex Waterworks Company, both of which are now part of Essex and Suffolk Water, which is itself part of the Northumbrian Water Group. When the Hanningfield Water Order 1950 (SI 1951/343) was passed by Parliament, it included a clause that made the water companies responsible for the lock gates, because water from the navigation would be pumped to the reservoir, and they needed to ensure that it would not become contaminated with salt. This arrangement was modified by the Chelmer Navigation Agreement 1964, which moved the responsibility for carrying out repairs to the Chelmer and Blackwater Company, but required the water companies to fund the work once its extent was agreed.

The lock was originally constructed of masonry, but in the mid-1960s, it was extended at the seaward end, when a steel caisson gate was installed in a reinforced concrete structure. The gate was designed by Sir William Halcrow & Partners, and weighed 58 tons. It was moved into place by electric motors driving chains, and had a hollow centre, making it partially buoyant, with the buoyancy being adjusted by the addition of ballast. Over time, the steelwork degraded, and the mechanism for controlling the flow of water into and out of the gate to alter its buoyancy ceased to operate, resulting in the rollers on which it moved seizing up. In 2014 Northumbrian Water agreed that the structure was beyond economic repair, and due to the complexity of the work, decided to manage the replacement project themselves. Options were somewhat constrained by the fact that the lock is a grade II listed structure, the site is designated as a Site of Special Scientific Interest, a Special Protection Area, a Ramsar site and is next to a Marine Conservation Zone.

After carrying out a feasibility study in October 2014, the sea gate was dismantled and removed in November 2015. Having checked its dimensions, Northumberland Water commissioned MWH Global and Kenneth Grub to design a new gate which would fit into the existing pocket, so that no modification of the lock structure would be required. The new gate would incorporate a number of improvements over the old. The chain drive was replaced by hydraulic rams, and the gate was no longer a buoyant structure. This reduced its weight to 26 tons, while the seals were mounted in sub-frames, allowing them to be more easily replaced. The gate moved along a rail, rather than over rollers, and featured an infilled hand-rail, effectively increasing its height. This gives greater protection to the inner timber gates from wave action.

A re-usable stop-log dam was constructed, to enable the lock to be isolated while the installation of the new gate was carried out and for future maintenance. While the lock was isolated, it was decided that the upper timber gates would also be replaced, and new gates were manufactured from sustainably sourced oak and ekki. Each gate weighed 5.5 tonnes, and they were craned into position in February 2017. The rails and sills for the sea gate were fitted in March, and the lock was then re-opened on 31 March for the summer season, with the sea gate expected to be fitted in November. The lock was drained in October 2017 for the sea gate to be fitted, and the intermediate mitre gates were also replaced. The sea gate had been tested and commissioned sufficiently for the lock to be reopened at the end of March 2018, with final commissioning and reinstatement of the footpath taking place in April and May.

== Points of interest ==
Point	Coordinates (Links to map resources)	OS Grid Ref	Notes
Chelmsford basin	51.7315°N 0.4813°E	TL714065	
Sandford lock	51.7285°N 0.5176°E	TL739063	
Little Baddow lock	51.7464°N 0.5460°E	TL758083	
Hoe Mill lock	51.7434°N 0.6163°E	TL807082	
River Blackwater crossing	51.7440°N 0.6635°E	TL839083	
Heybridge basin and sea lock	51.7290°N 0.7082°E	TL871068	

== Gallery ==
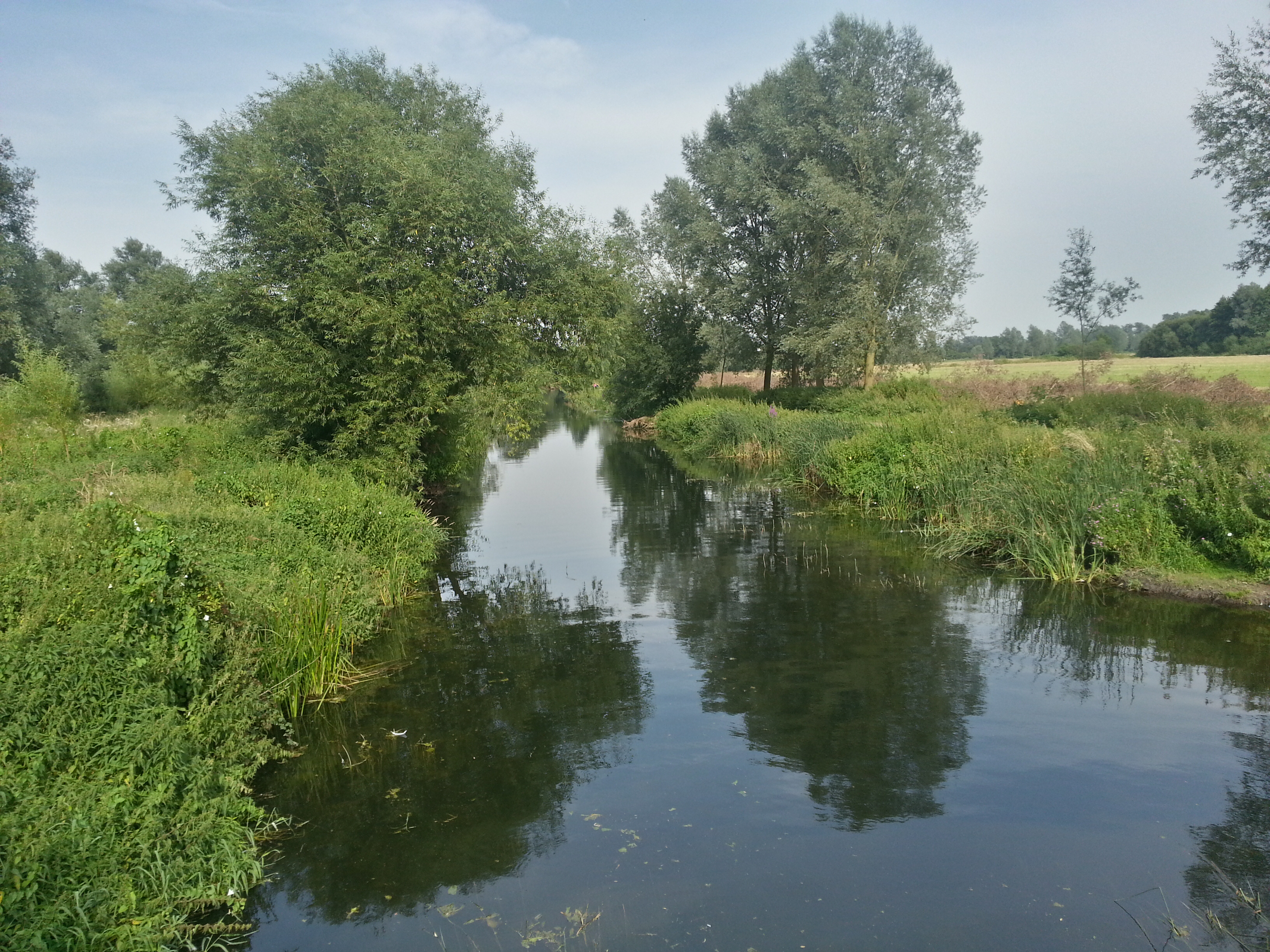
Blackwater and Chelmer Canal

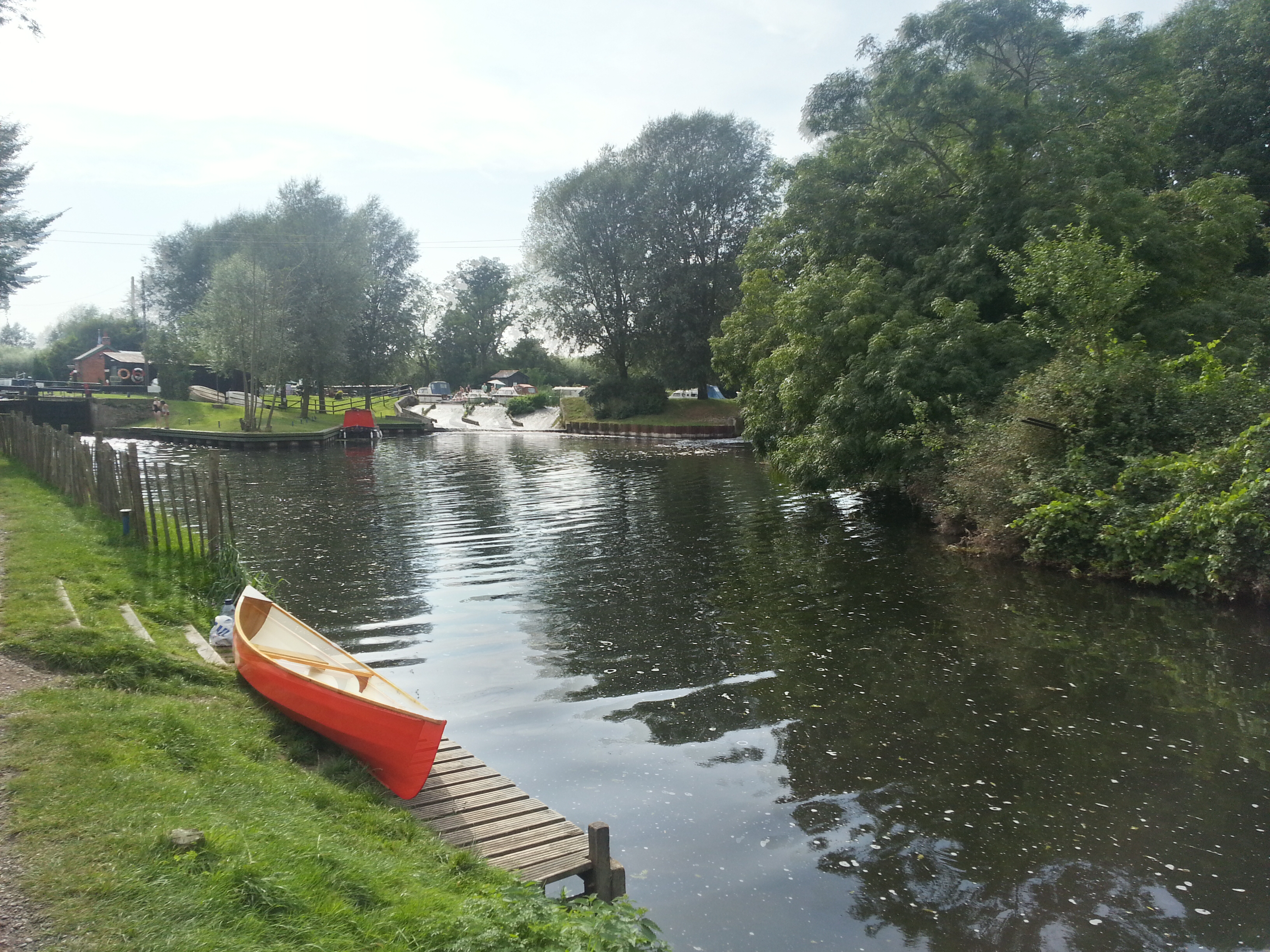
Papermill lock, Little Baddow

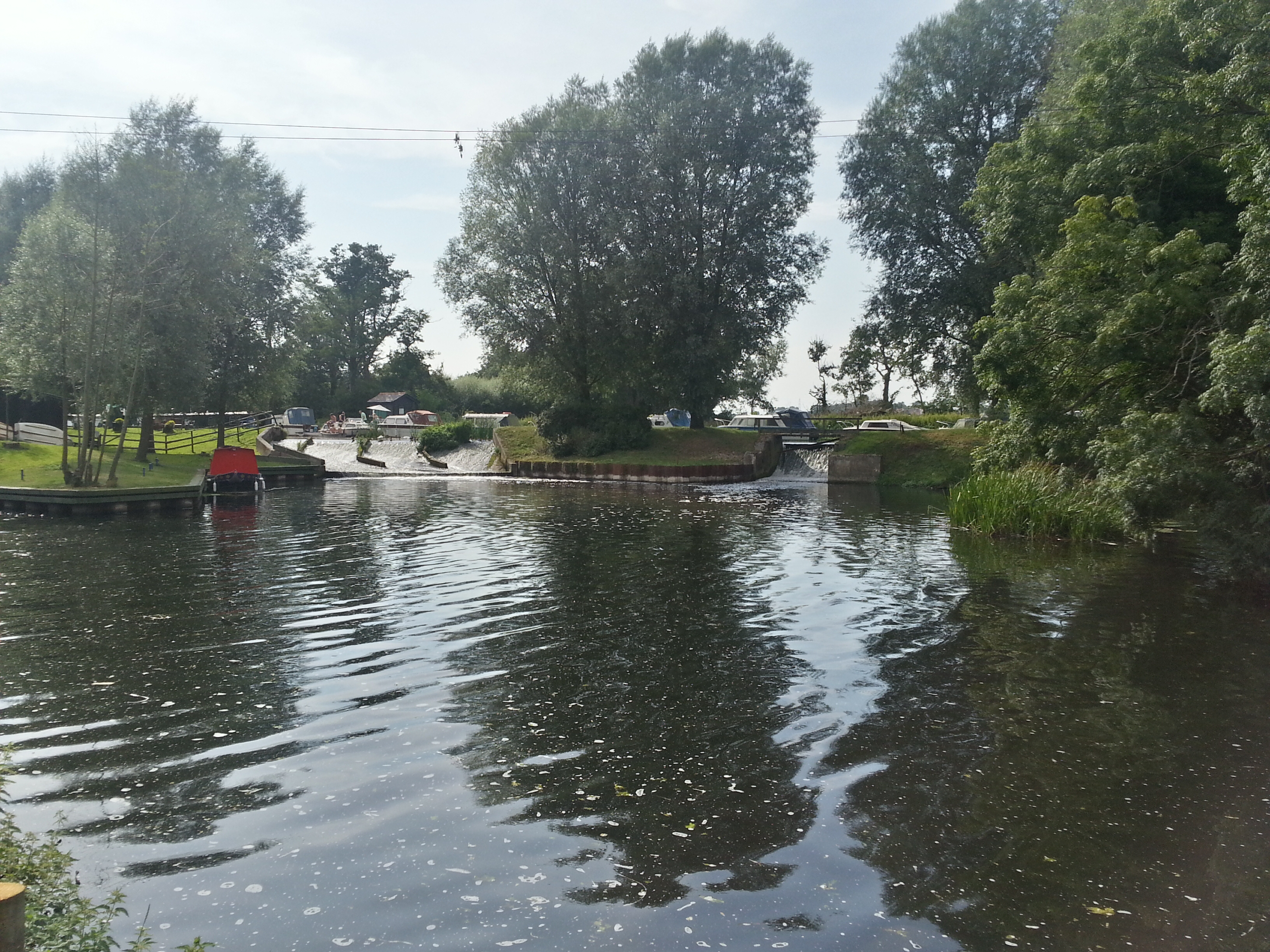
Papermill lock, Little Baddow

== Bibliography ==
- Boyes, John; Russell, Ronald (1977). The Canals of Eastern England. David and Charles. ISBN 978-0-7153-7415-3.
- Cumberlidge, Jane (2009). Inland Waterways of Great Britain (8th Ed.). Imray Laurie Norie and Wilson. ISBN 978-1-84623-010-3.
- Ferris, Mick (28 February 2020). "£6million lock gate plan for River Chelmer". Yellow Advertiser. Archived from the original on 18 February 2021.
- Jacobs (17 January 2020). "Chelmer Automatic Weir Replacement" (PDF). Jacobs UK. Archived (PDF) from the original on 18 February 2021.
- Lloyd, Ryan (1 October 2017). "Heybridge Sea Gate & Lock Gate Replacement". Water Projects Online. Archived from the original on 17 February 2021.
- Meyler, Piers (4 September 2020). "New Chelmsford lock plans "most practical, realistic and affordable solution"". Yellow Advertiser. Archived from the original on 18 September 2020.
- Nicholson (2006). Nicholson Guides Vol 1: Grand Union, Oxford & the South East. Harper Collins. ISBN 978-0-00-721109-8.
- Priestley, Joseph (1831). "Historical Account of the Navigable Rivers, Canals, and Railways of Great Britain". Archived from the original on 7 March 2016.
- Rutherford, Justin (October 2012). "The Only Waterway is Essex". Waterways World. ISSN 0309-1422.
- Skempton, Sir Alec; et al. (2002). A Biographical Dictionary of Civil Engineers in Great Britain and Ireland: Vol 1: 1500 to 1830. Thomas Telford. ISBN 978-0-7277-2939-2.
- Wyllie, Adam; et al. (17 September 2019). "Canal Link feasibility report" (PDF). Chelmsford Rivers and Canal Link Group. Archived (PDF) from the original on 18 February 2021.
