= River Chelmer =

River in Essex, England

Chelmer
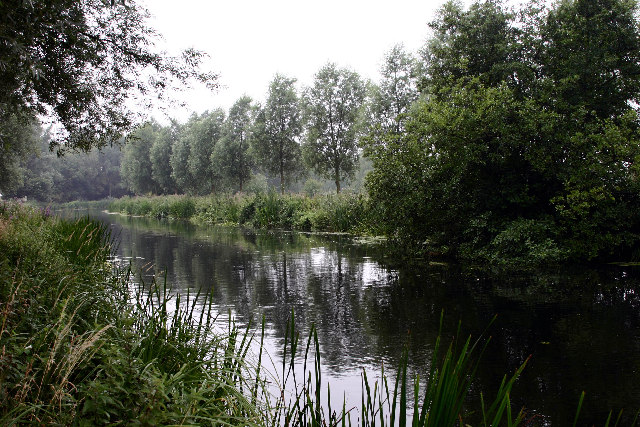
- River Chelmer, near Little Baddow

Location
- Country: England
- Region: Essex
- City: Chelmsford

Physical characteristics
- Source
  - location: Hamperden End
  - coordinates: 51.9546°N 0.2850°E
  - elevation: 117 m (384 ft)
- Mouth: River Blackwater
  - location: near Maldon
  - coordinates: 51.7228°N 0.7073°E
  - elevation: 0 m (0 ft)
- Length: 40 mi (64 km)

Basin features
- River system: River Blackwater
- Tributaries
  - right: River Can

The River Chelmer flows entirely through the county of Essex, England; it runs 40 miles (64 km) from the north-west of the county through Chelmsford to the River Blackwater, near Maldon.

== Course ==
The source of the river is in the parish of Debden in north west Essex. The two primary source streams run to the north and to the west of the hamlet of Debden Green. The longer of the sources rises in Rowney Wood, on the hill to the west of Debden Green, only a few hundred metres to the south east of the source of the River Cam that heads north through Cambridge eventually emptying into The Wash.

The River Chelmer flows past Thaxted, south through the district of Uttlesford around the northeast of Great Dunmow. It continues flowing south-southeast into the borough of Chelmsford and on into the city of Chelmsford where the River Can flows into it. It then flows east through the borough and into the district of Maldon until it meets the River Blackwater east of Maldon. It discharges into the North Sea via the Blackwater Estuary.

== History ==
Chelmer is not the original name of the river but rather a back-formation from the name of Chelmsford, under the assumption that the ford and town were named for the river they straddle (the actual namesake being a Saxon landholder, Cēolmǣr). Earlier, the river was known as the Baddow, which survives in the names of Great and Little Baddow. The Chelmer and Blackwater Navigation Company was founded by act of parliament in 1793. Work then commenced on constructing the navigation from Chelmsford to Colliers Reach in the tidal estuary of the river Blackwater. The work was completed in 1797. The navigation mainly followed the course of the river Chelmer from Chelmsford to Beeleigh near Maldon. From there it continued through a short cut and then followed the course of the river Blackwater to Heybridge.

According to Edward Arthur Fitch, the Fullbridge (the Chelmer river crossing at the bottom of Market Hill, Maldon) was a shallow ford. This was before the waters of the River Blackwater were combined with the Chelmer at Beeleigh, resulting in a much greater flow of water past the Fullbridge.

In the spring of 1812 the Chelmer above the Fullbridge was straightened and many important changes were made to the bed of the river. Some of these changes are clearly visible today. For example, an island that is shown on the 1777 Chapman and Andre map of Essex was moved from the middle of the river to fill in a curve to the north near where Tesco is today. Further upstream, near the golf course, similar earthwork is visible and, from that point to Beeleigh weir the channel appears to be a cut bypassing the original course of the river.

At Beeleigh, there was a water mill on the original course of the Chelmer. This mill operated until 1875, when it was destroyed by fire. The mill had two bays inside, where lighters were loaded with flour to be taken to the port at Maldon, about a mile downstream. There it would be loaded onto Thames sailing barges and taken to London. Part of the mill still remains and is leased by Essex County Council with the intention of restoring it.

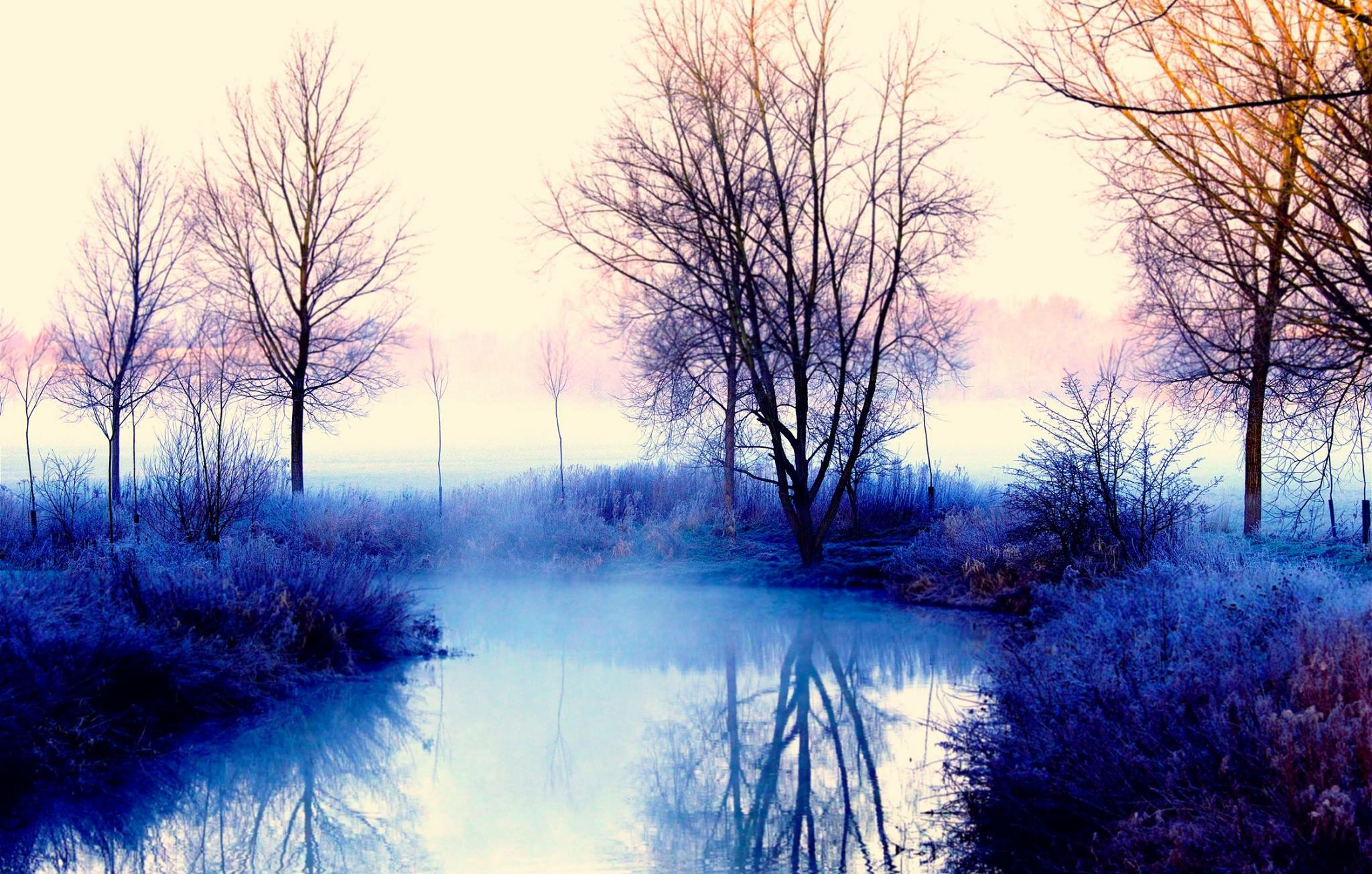
River Chelmer near Little Baddow

== Gallery ==
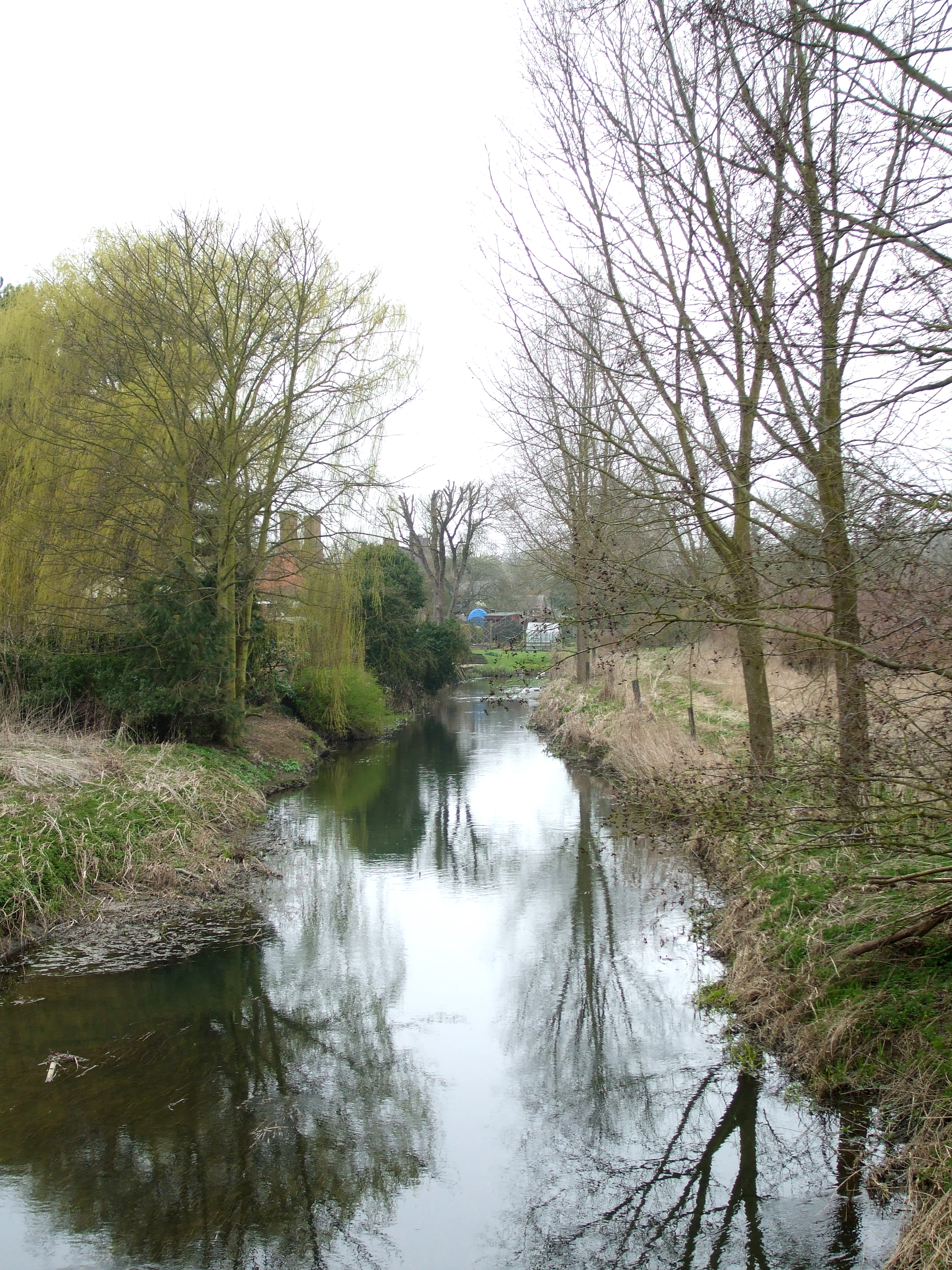
River Chelmer at Howe Street

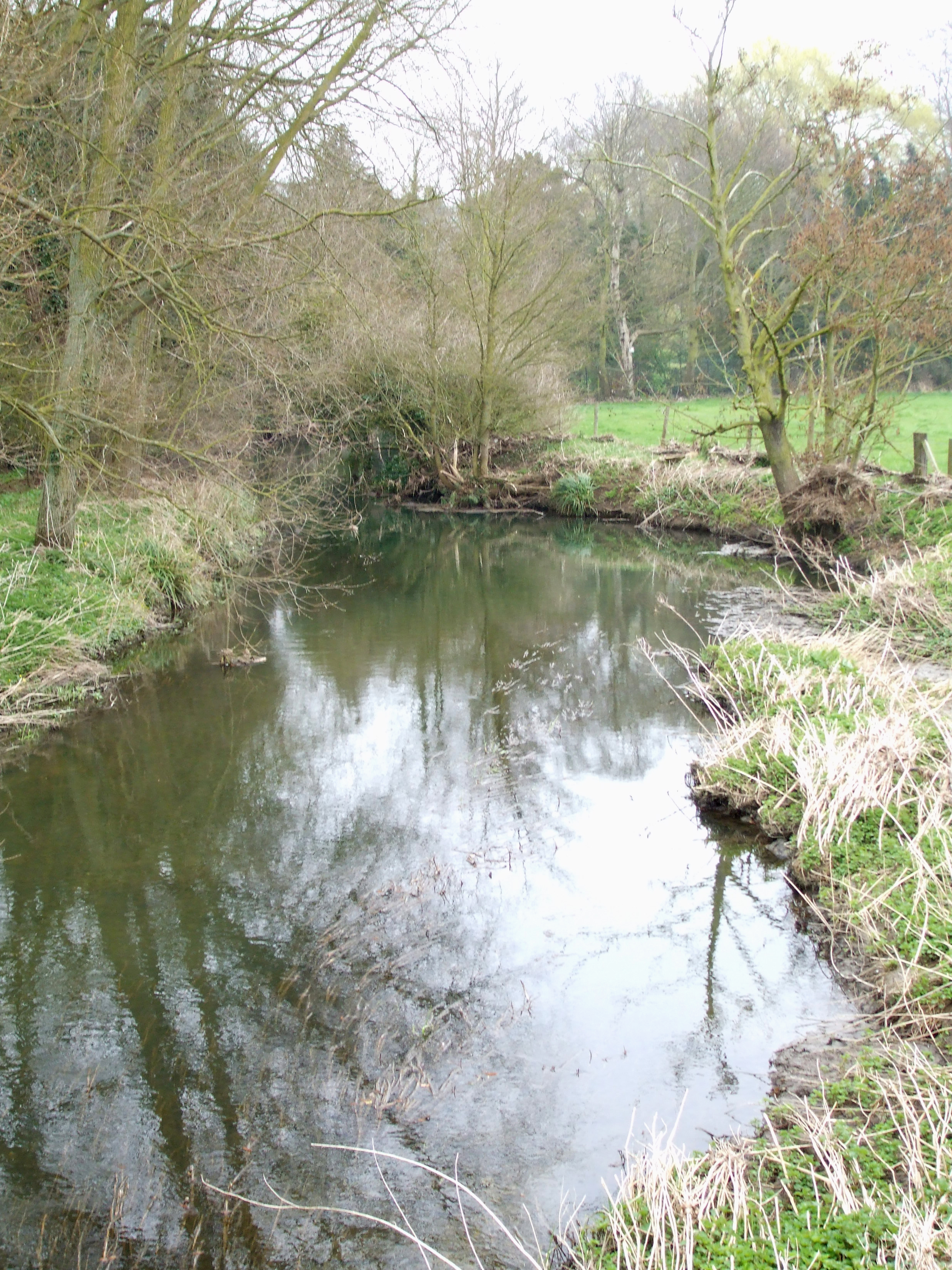
River Chelmer at Howe Street

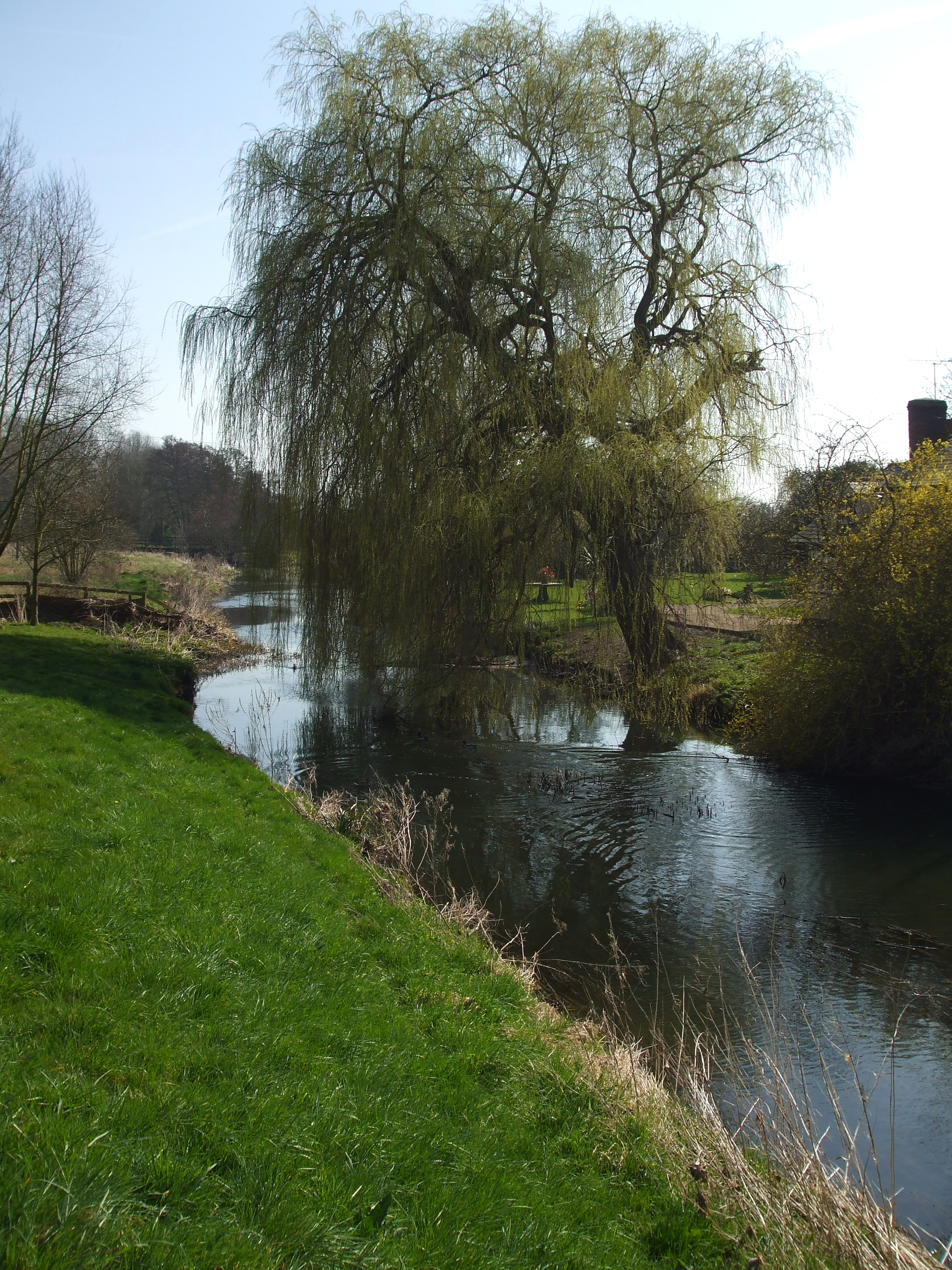
River Chelmer at Little Waltham

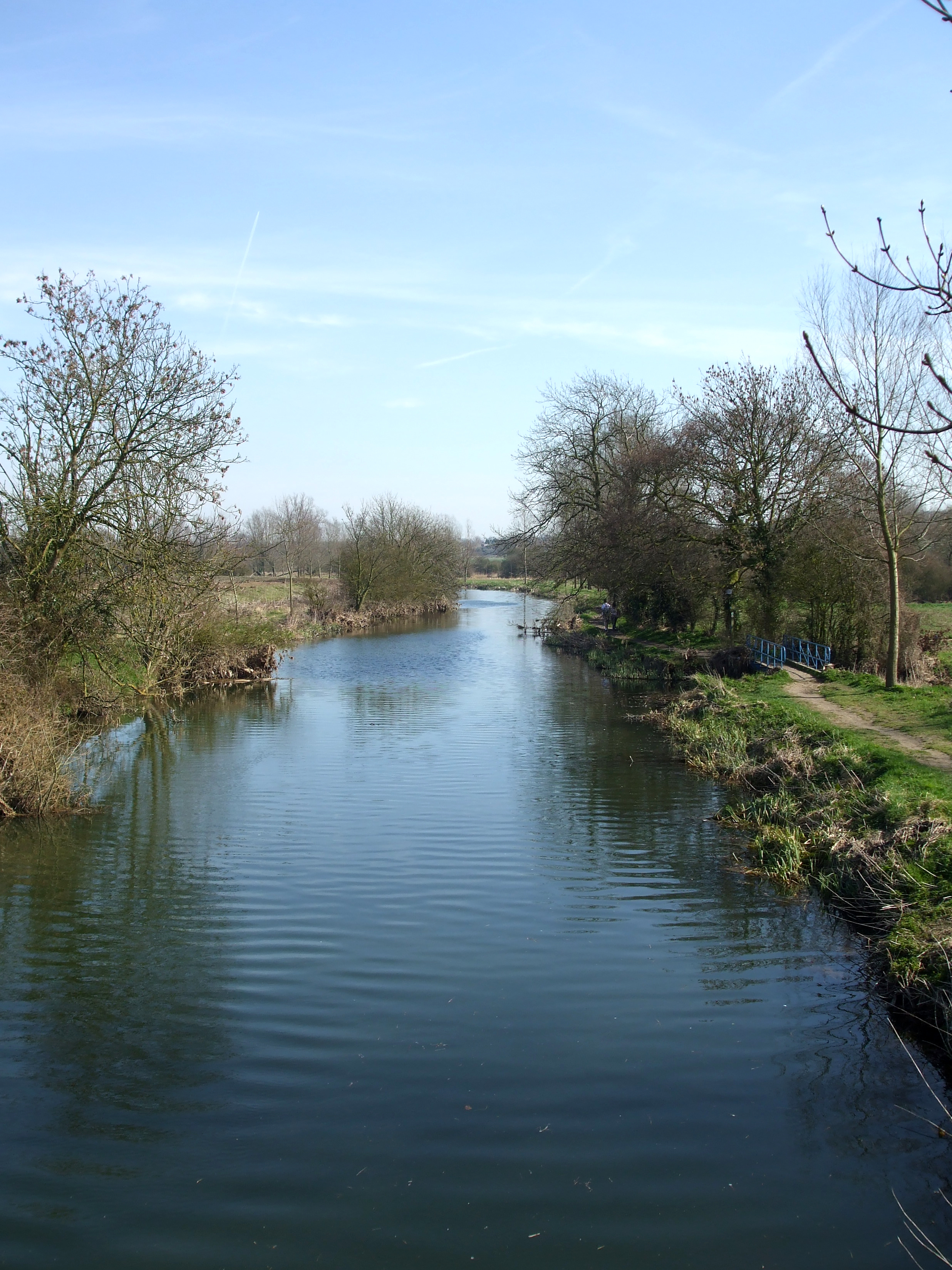
River Chelmer near Little Baddow

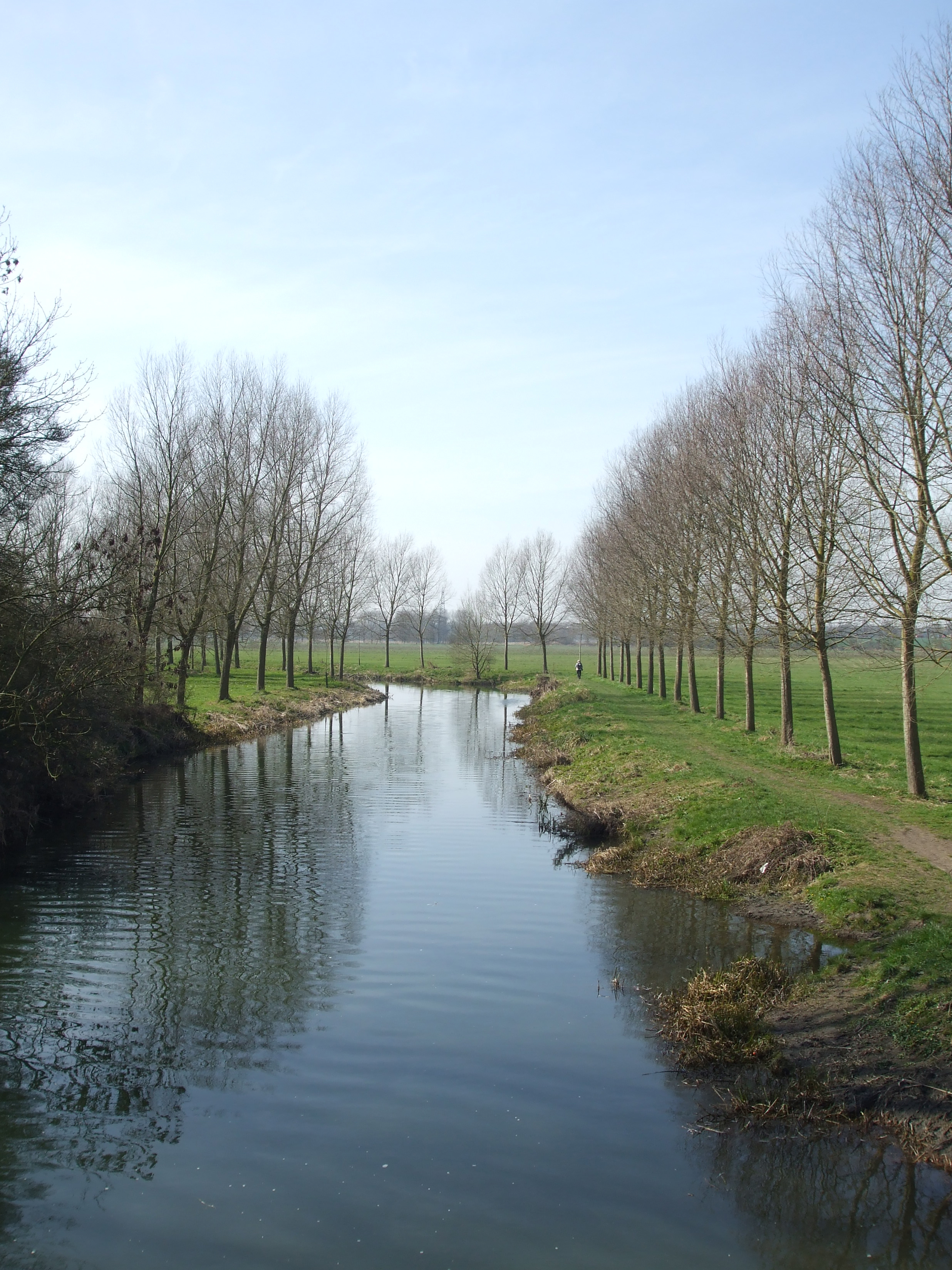
River Chelmer near Little Baddow

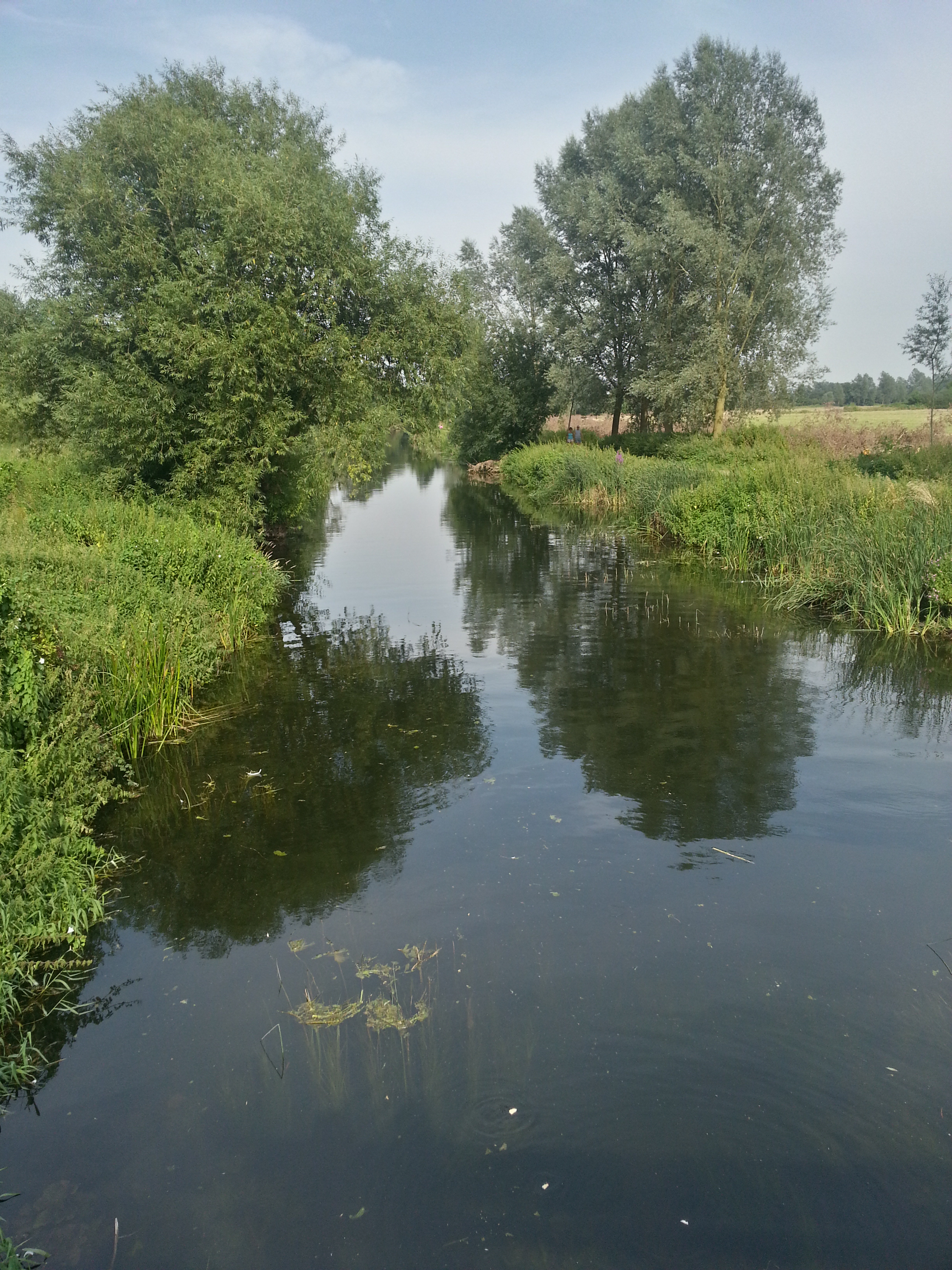
River Chelmer near Papermill Lock, Little Baddow

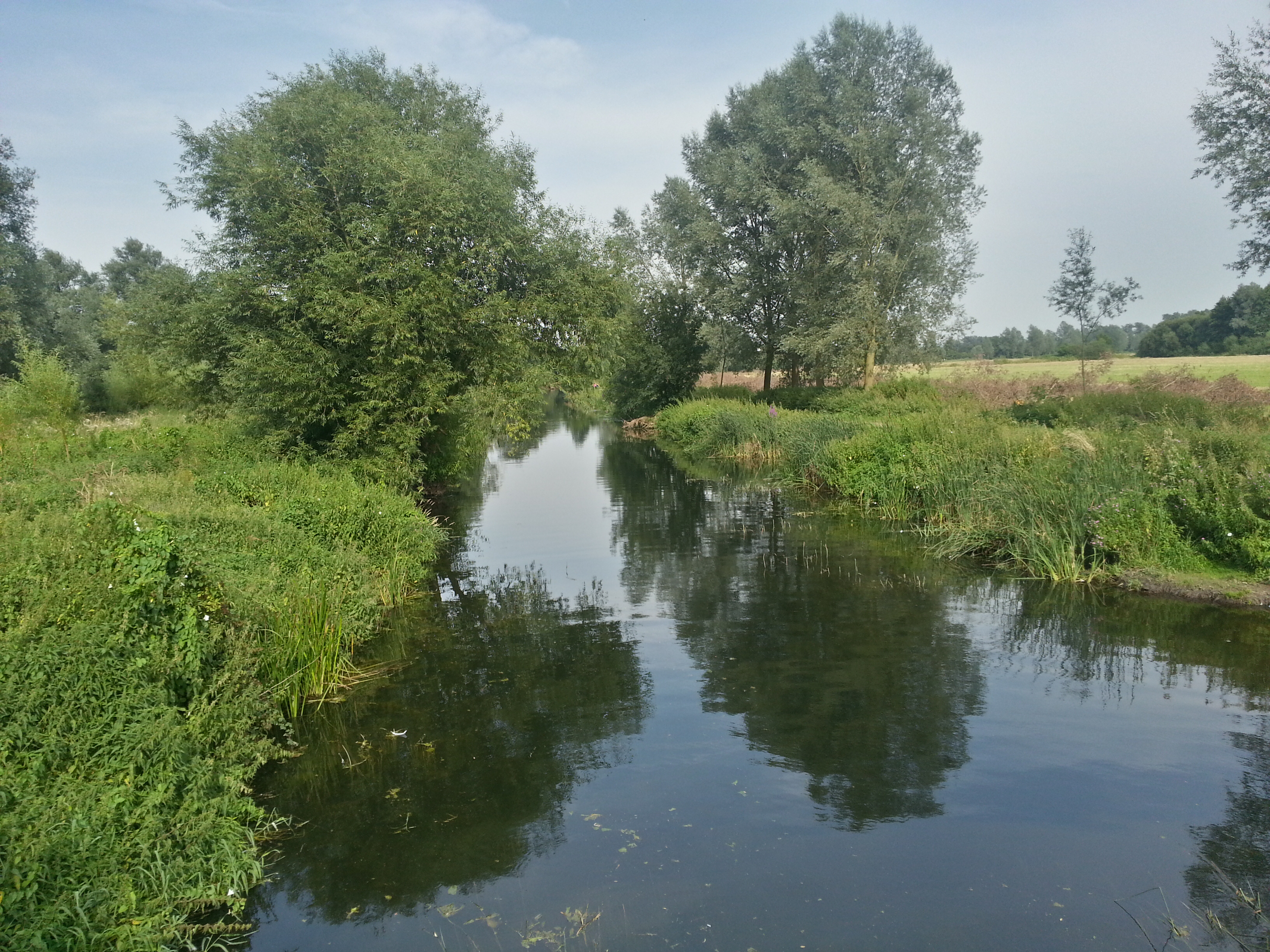
River Chelmer near Papermill Lock, Little Baddow

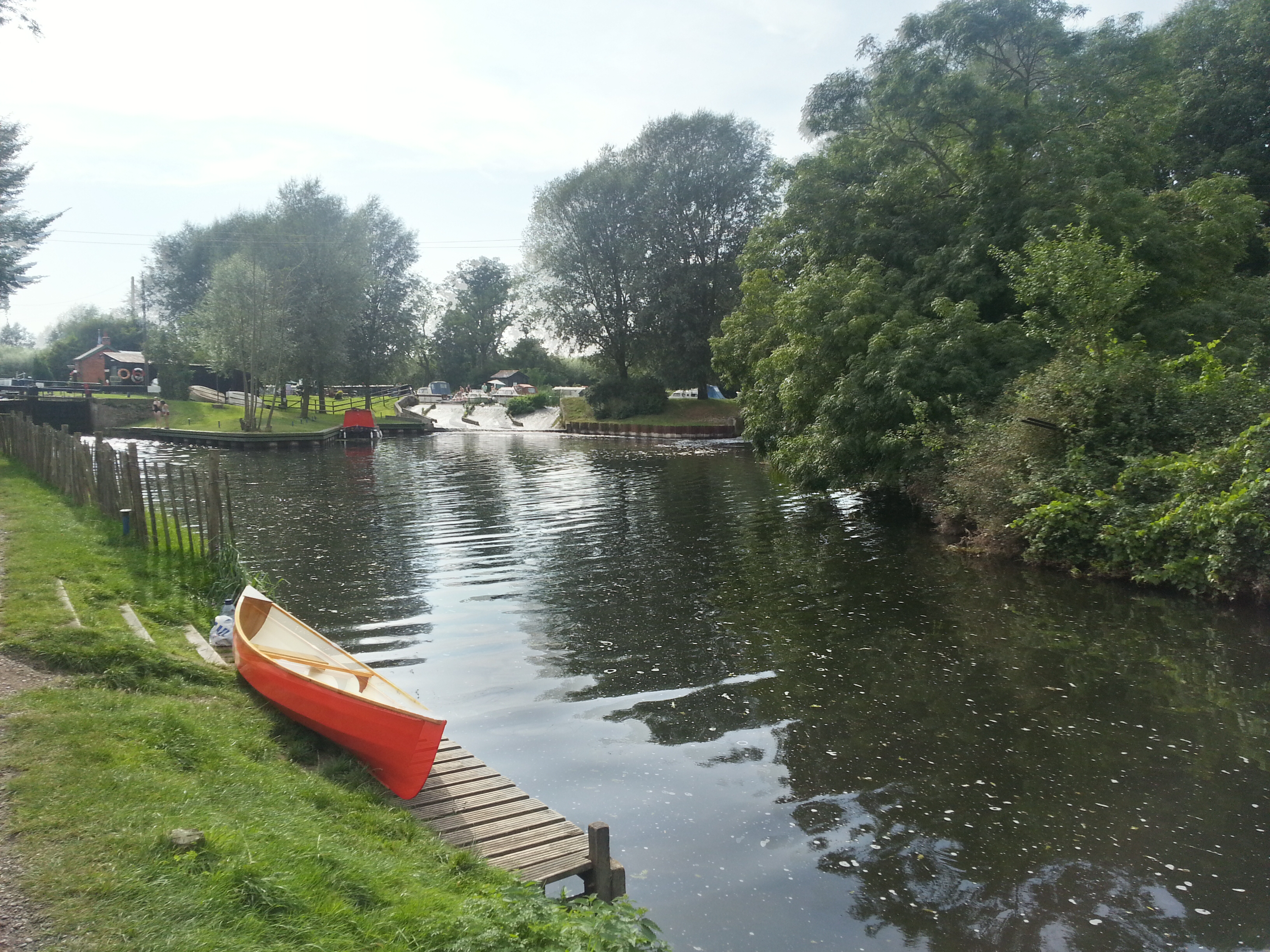
Papermill Lock, Little Baddow

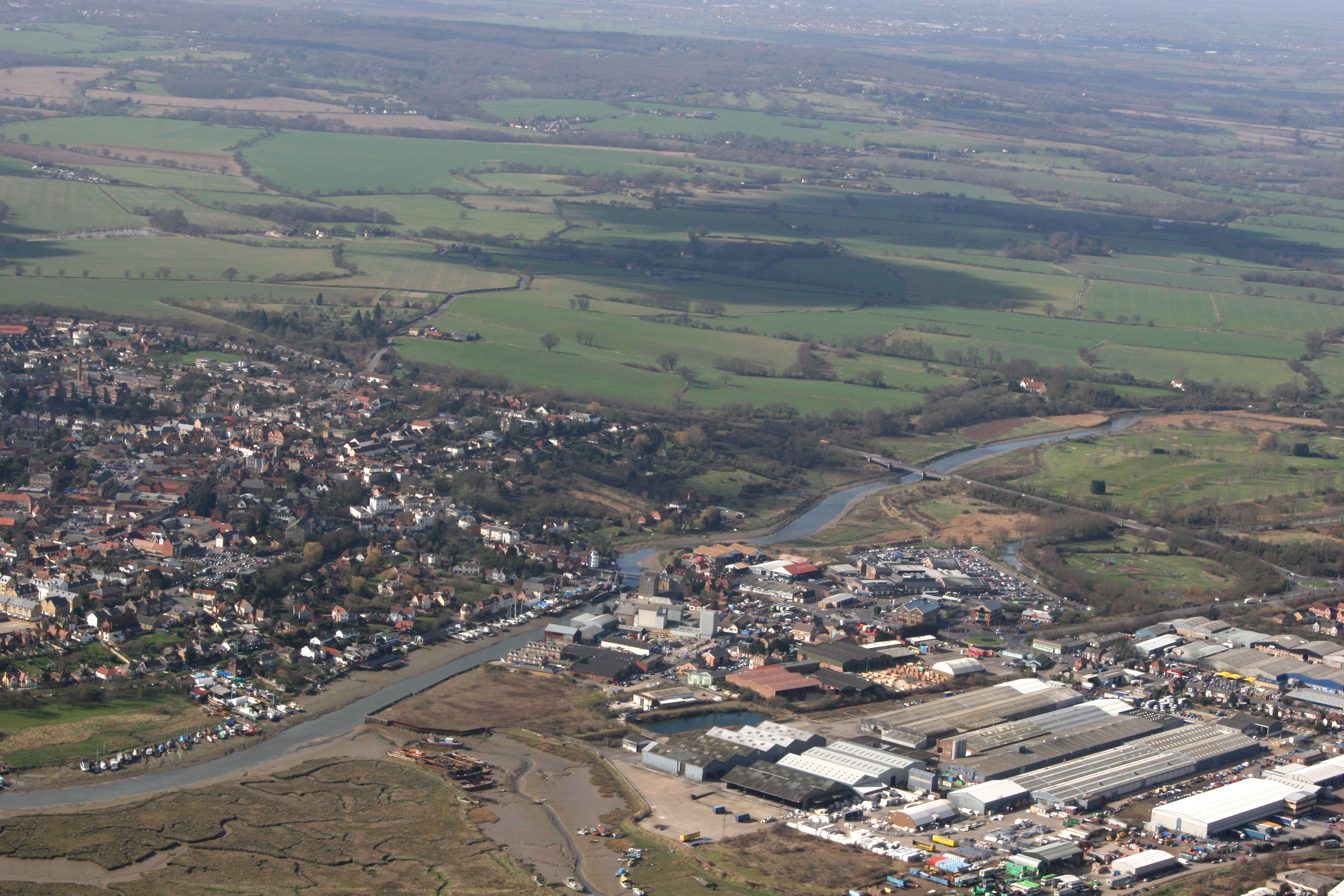
River Chelmer at Maldon

== See also ==
- River Blackwater
- Museum of Power - Langford pumping station extracts from the Chelmer
