= Firbeck =

Village and civil parish in South Yorkshire, England

Coordinates: 53.3917°N 1.15°W

- Village
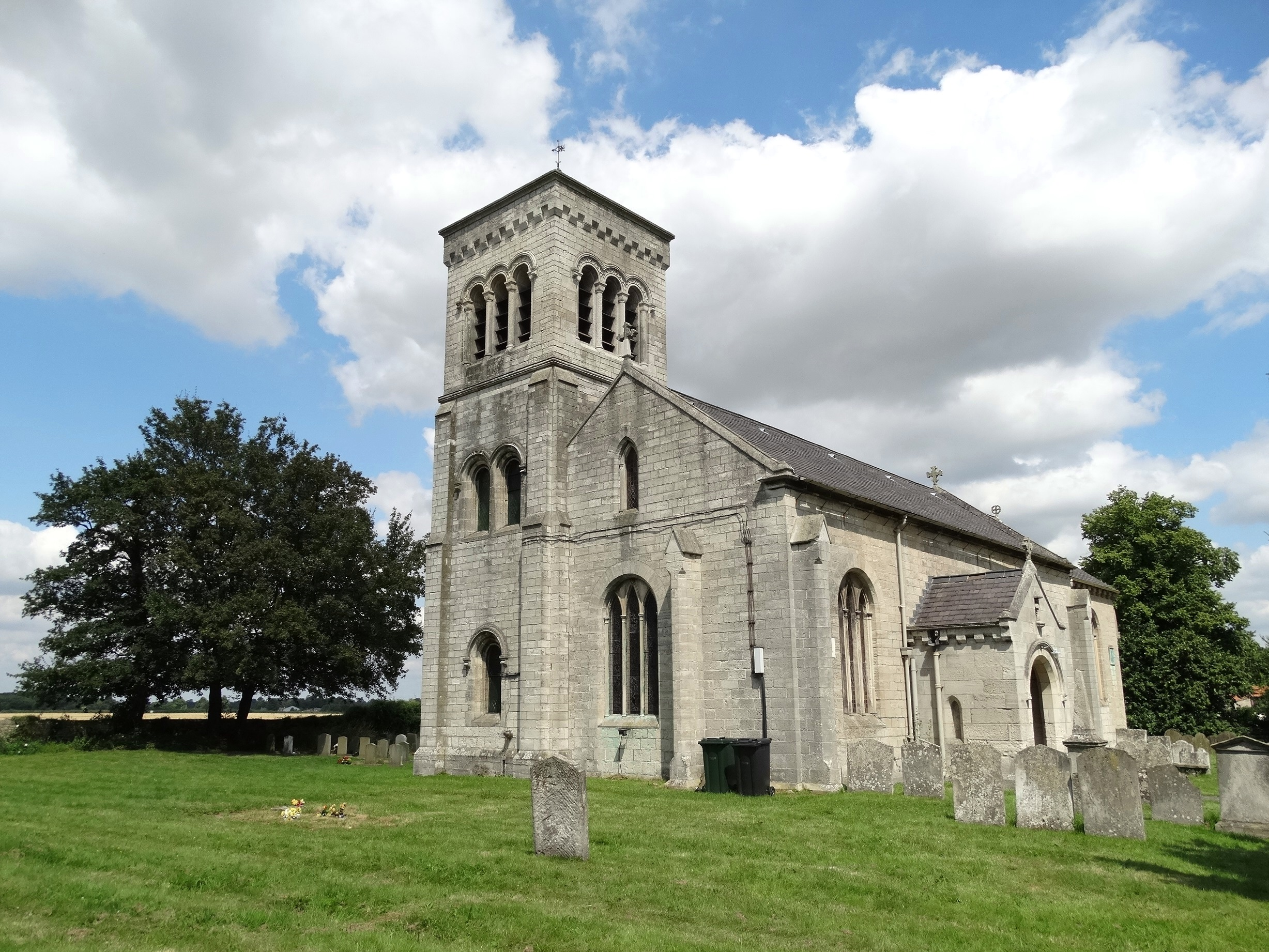
- St Martin's Church, Firbeck

- Location within South Yorkshire
- Population: 299 (2011 Census)
- Civil parish: Firbeck
- Metropolitan borough: Rotherham
- Metropolitan county: South Yorkshire
- Region: Yorkshire and the Humber
- Country: England
- Sovereign state: United Kingdom
- Post town: WORKSOP
- Postcode district: S81
- Dialling code: 01709
- Police: South Yorkshire
- Fire: South Yorkshire
- Ambulance: Yorkshire
- UK Parliament: Rother Valley

Firbeck is a village and civil parish in the Metropolitan Borough of Rotherham in South Yorkshire, England, on the border with Nottinghamshire. It lies between Maltby and Oldcotes, off the A634 and B6463 roads. Firbeck had a population of 317 in 2001, which had fallen to 299 at the 2011 Census.

== History ==
The place name Firbeck is thought to derive from a wood streamlet, or beck of the Frith.

An oval field in the village marks what was once the private racecourse of 18th century racehorse owner Anthony St Leger, who originated the St Leger Stakes. While the first "St. Leger" race was held on Cantley Common in 1776, was not so named until over a year later, and moved to Doncaster Racecourse in 1778, local legend holds that the race was being run in Firbeck prior to this. St Leger lived at Park Hill, an estate to the south of Firbeck, the main house was demolished in 1935, but there are still Grade II listed farm buildings, dating from the 17th century and built of limestone rubble with a roof of pantiles, within the grounds of the estate.

Village amenities include The Black Lion public house, and St Martin's Church, which was rebuilt on the site of a previous building in 1820. A north aisle was added in 1844, and in 1887, Henry Gladwyn Jebb commissioned the builders E. I. Hubbard of Rotherham to enlarge it further. When Jebb died, a tower was added in 1900 in his memory. The building includes two 19th-century wall monuments to the Knight family of Langold, while there is a larger 18th-century monument to other members of the family in the churchyard. Both the tomb and the church building are Grade II listed.

== Firbeck Hall ==
Firbeck Hall was built in 1594 by William West, who was steward to Francis Talbot, 5th Earl of Shrewsbury, and to Gilbert Talbot, 7th Earl of Shrewsbury from 1580 to 1594. He was from Rotherham, and had made a fortune as a practising lawyer. West was the author of a legal textbook called Symbolaeographia, and stipulated in his will of 1598 that "a grave stone be set for me and my said wife in Firbeck Church, and ingraven with our arms and names and some posy." In 1676, the hall was purchased by Jonathan Staniforth, son of William Staniforth of Rotherham. The family had been puritans during the English Civil War, and were staunch Nonconformists. Jonathan married four times, first to Dorothy Shaw, secondly to Anne Spateman, thirdly to Mary Disney, daughter of John Disney, and finally to Christian Knight, daughter of Ralph Knight. Upon Jonathan's death in 1679, the house was passed down to his son Disney Staniforth. Disney married Mary Skinner and had a son named Jonathan, and three daughters Mary, Henrietta and Amelia. The children were known to be reclusive, never marrying or having offspring. In 1768, the estates of Firbeck and nearby Langold were inherited by Elizabeth Gally (née Knight), whose husband was Rev Dr Henry Gally, Rector of St Giles in the Fields, Camden, and chaplain to King George II. His two sons added the name Knight to their existing names, the eldest, John Gally Knight, living at Langold Hall, and the youngest, a barrister called Henry, residing in Firbeck Hall. Following Henry's death in 1808, his widow Selina devoted herself to serving the community, rebuilding Firbeck Church, and establishing schools in Firbeck and the neighbouring village of Letwell. When she died in 1823, the estate passed to her son, another Henry.

Her son was the 19th-century architect and writer Henry Gally Knight who is assumed to have been a principal information source for Walter Scott during the writing of Ivanhoe. Knight was the Member of Parliament for North Nottinghamshire from 1814 to 1831, and was also the High Sheriff of Nottinghamshire. He wrote books on European medieval architecture, wrote poetry, and knew the poet Lord Byron. He intended to build a large mansion overlooking Langold Lakes, but having commissioned the plans, changed his mind, and lived at the Hall. He married his wife Henrietta in 1826. The hall was extended and improved, and a notable feature was the steep gables which he added. He died on 9 February 1846, and left the hall in his will to the Ecclesiastical Commissioners. Seven years later, the commissioners sold the estate, and it was purchased by Frances Harriett Miles (née Jebb). The Rev. Henry Gladwyn Jebb, who was involved in the rebuilding of St Martin's church, inherited the building on the death of Mrs Miles, and it passed to his nephew Captain Sydney Gladwyn Jebb in 1898. Sydney Jebb was a wealthy landowner, and a Justice of the peace in the West Riding of Yorkshire, but chose to live in Maidstone, Kent. The house was rented out, after attempts to sell it failed in 1909. Some modernisation was carried out at the beginning of World War I, when several Belgian families were housed there.

=== Country club ===
The estate was sold again in 1934 to Cyril Nicholson. Robert Cawkwell of Sheffield was responsible for the interior designs when, in 1935, Nicholson, a Sheffield stockbroker, opened the hall as a country club, investing £80,000 in its art deco renovation. The interior was dramatically modernised and featured a mirror-walled ballroom and an elaborate and versatile state-of-the-art lighting system. There was also a heated outdoor swimming pool, and membership fees ranged from three to seven guineas. Nicholson built an airfield in the grounds, enlisting the help of the pilot Captain Tom Campbell Black, who with C. W. A. Scott had won the air race from Mildenhall to Melbourne in 1935. Black was a well-connected socialite, and it was through him that the then Prince of Wales learned of the club, flying there in his private Dragon aircraft, which bore the royal insignia. The aviator Amy Johnson also patronised the club. Other facilities included an 18-hole golf course, the design of which Nicholson entrusted to the celebrity golfer John S.F. Morrison, championship-standard squash courts, and tennis courts. The 100-foot (30 m) swimming pool was built by the Sheffield-based construction company B. Powell and Son. Such was the club's reputation, that the BBC transmitted its weekly Saturday show "Late Night Dance Music" with Henry Hall, Carroll Gibbons and Charlie Kunz from Firbeck.

=== Second World War onwards ===
At the outbreak of the Second World War, the hall was used by Sheffield Royal Infirmary and the Royal Air Force, with the adjacent aerodrome becoming RAF Firbeck. The hall was unsuccessfully offered for sale in 1943, but in 1945 it was bought by the Coal Industry Social Welfare Organisation (CISWO) for use as a convalescent home and rehabilitation centre for injured miners. This centre closed in 1984. It was subsequently used by the Trent Regional Health Authority as a rehabilitation centre for those suffering from industrial injuries, and till about 1990. It was bought by a development company in 1996, Cambs Construction Ltd, but from then the hall fell into a state of disrepair. In 2009, a group called the Friends of Firbeck Hall was established, to attempt to secure a future for the site. Cambs Construction failed in May 2010, and the liquidators sold the estate to a development company based in Doncaster for £350,000. The company set about restoring the West Lodge, which was completed in early 2014, but there was another change of ownership later that year. The new owners held a consultation event outlining their plans for the building on 1 November 2016 in Firbeck Village Hall. The Friends group are optimistic that this might result in the building and its 44 acres (18 ha) of surrounding conservation land, which forms a substantial part of the village, being rescued from dereliction.

=== The airfield ===
Nicholson's airfield was used by the Sheffield Aero Club in 1938, who had a collection of de Havilland Tiger Moth and Gipsy Moth biplanes. With the Second World War looming, it became part of Sir Kingsley Wood's "Great Flying Scheme" in 1939, which aimed to train volunteer pilots for the Royal Air Force, and in 1940, the whole site was requisitioned by the Air Ministry. It became RAF Firbeck and a base for No. 613 Squadron RAF initially, following their move from Netherthorpe Airfield and was used as a training base. After the war ended, it was decommissioned, with the hangar being dismantled in 1948, and the area was returned to agricultural use. A small area of concrete apron remains, and in 2011, a memorial was unveiled by Wing Commander John E Bates OBE, to honour those who served at the base.

== Notable people ==
- Gladwyn Jebb was born in Firbeck

== See also ==
- Listed buildings in Firbeck
- Firbeck Colliery, outside the parish
