= Debden, Uttlesford =

Village in Essex, England

Coordinates: 51.97812°N 0.26703°E

Debden
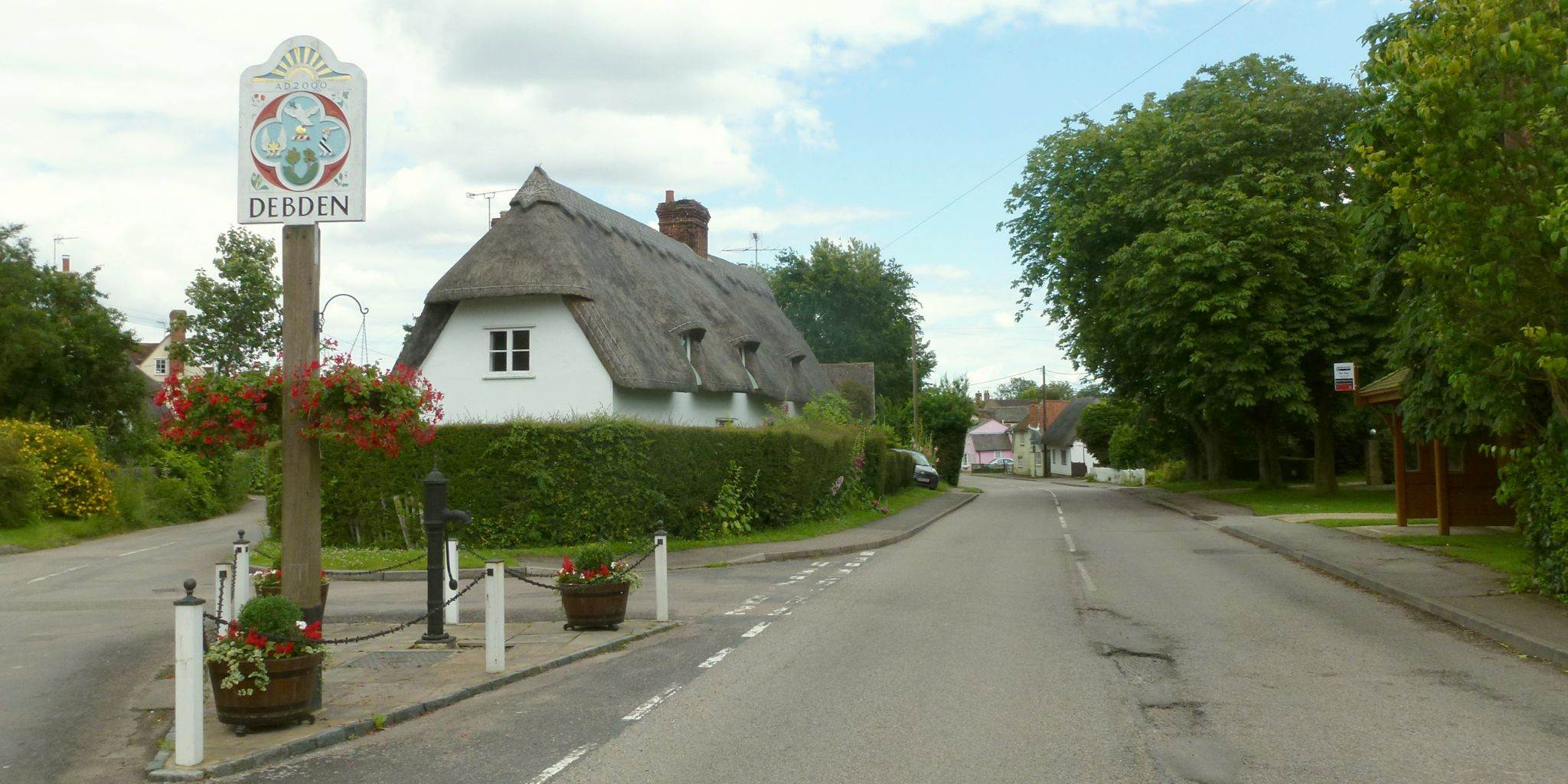
- Debden High Street

- Location within Essex
- Population: 788 (Parish, 2021)
- OS grid reference: TL558335
- Civil parish: Debden
- District: Uttlesford
- Shire county: Essex
- Region: East
- Country: England
- Sovereign state: United Kingdom
- Post town: SAFFRON WALDEN
- Postcode district: CB11
- Dialling code: 01799
- Police: Essex
- Fire: Essex
- Ambulance: East of England
- UK Parliament: Saffron Walden

Debden is a village and civil parish in the Uttlesford district of Essex, England. It is located 4 miles (6 km) from Saffron Walden and 17 miles (27 km) from Cambridge. The parish includes the hamlets of Debden Green, Hamperden End and Rook End. At the 2021 census the parish had a population of 788.

RAF Debden is nearby and played a role in the Second World War.

== History ==
The village was recorded in the Domesday Book of 1086 as Depeduna (deep valley), and became known as Debden at the time of the Napoleonic Wars.

After the Norman conquest the manor of Debden was granted to Ralph Peverel, but reverted to the crown after Peverel's grandson, William Peverel the Younger, poisoned the Earl of Chester. King John later granted the manor to Geoffrey Fitzpeter, 1st Earl of Essex and it descended in that family until becoming Crown land again. Henry VIII granted it to Lord Audley, from whom it descended to his grandson, Thomas Howard, Baron Howard de Walden and Earl of Suffolk. It was acquired in 1715 by wealthy merchant Richard Chiswell, MP and remained in the Chiswell family for some 100 years. It then passed by marriage to the Vincent family who held it until 1882 when Mrs Cely-Trevilian, the last member of the family, sold it to William Fuller-Maitland of Stansted Mountfitchet Hall. By the First World War it had come into the possession of Lord Strathcona and Mount Royal. Later owners found Debden Hall too expensive to maintain, and so the house was demolished and part of the estate sold off in 1935.

The Church of England Parish Church of St Mary the Virgin and All Saints is Grade I listed. A flint and stone church is 13th century but with considerable 18th-century restoration and rebuilding after the 1698 fall of the central tower which destroyed the chancel. The clerestorey and chancel were rebuilt in 1793 when the west bell turret, spire and parapets of the nave and aisles were probably added. The restoration and rebuilding was done by Richard Muilman Trench Chiswell of Debden Hall, whose elaborate tomb in the chancel was designed by John Carter.

Since 2007 the village has been twinned with the village of Tang Ting in rural Nepal.

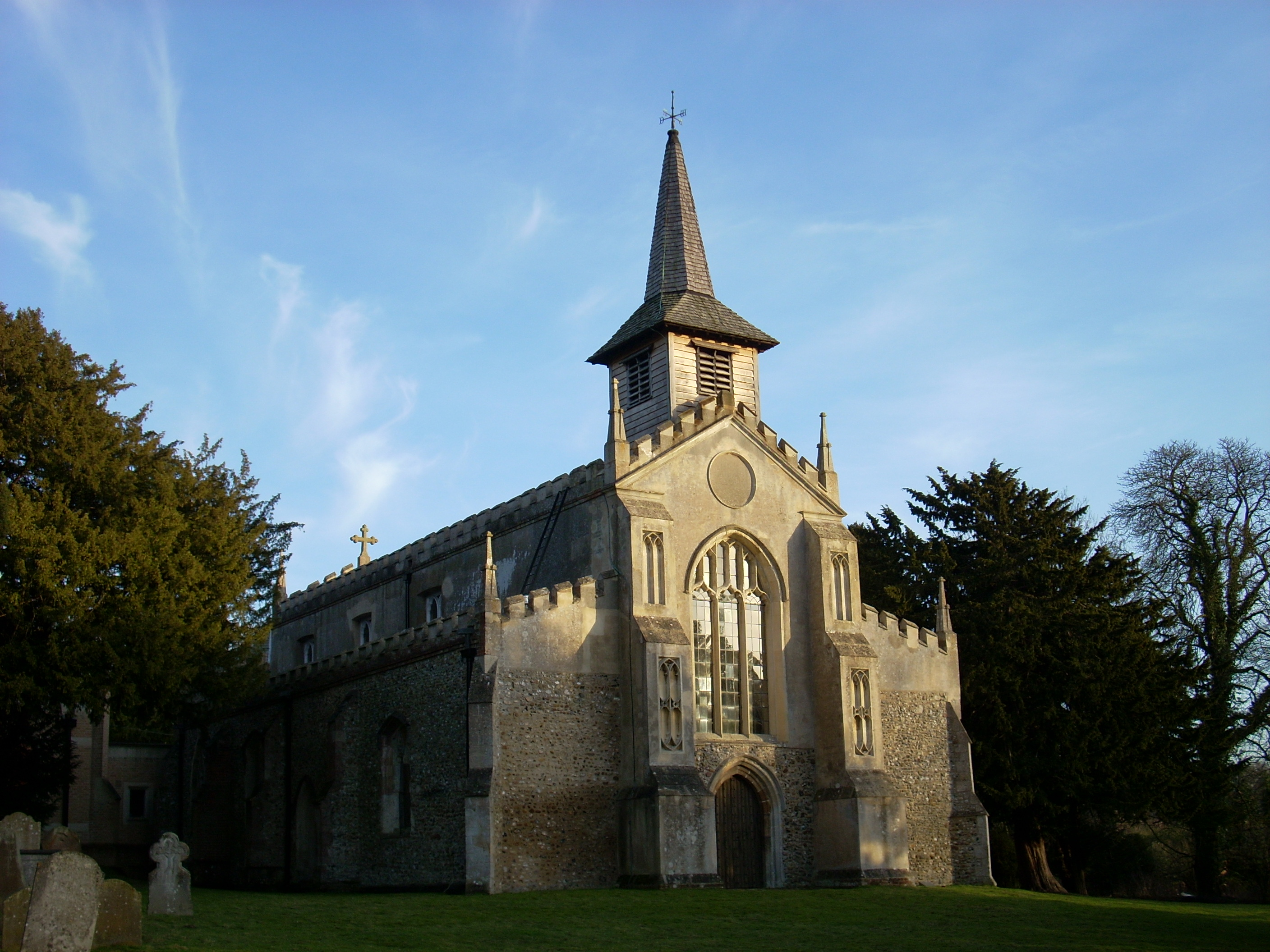
Church of St Mary the Virgin and All Saints

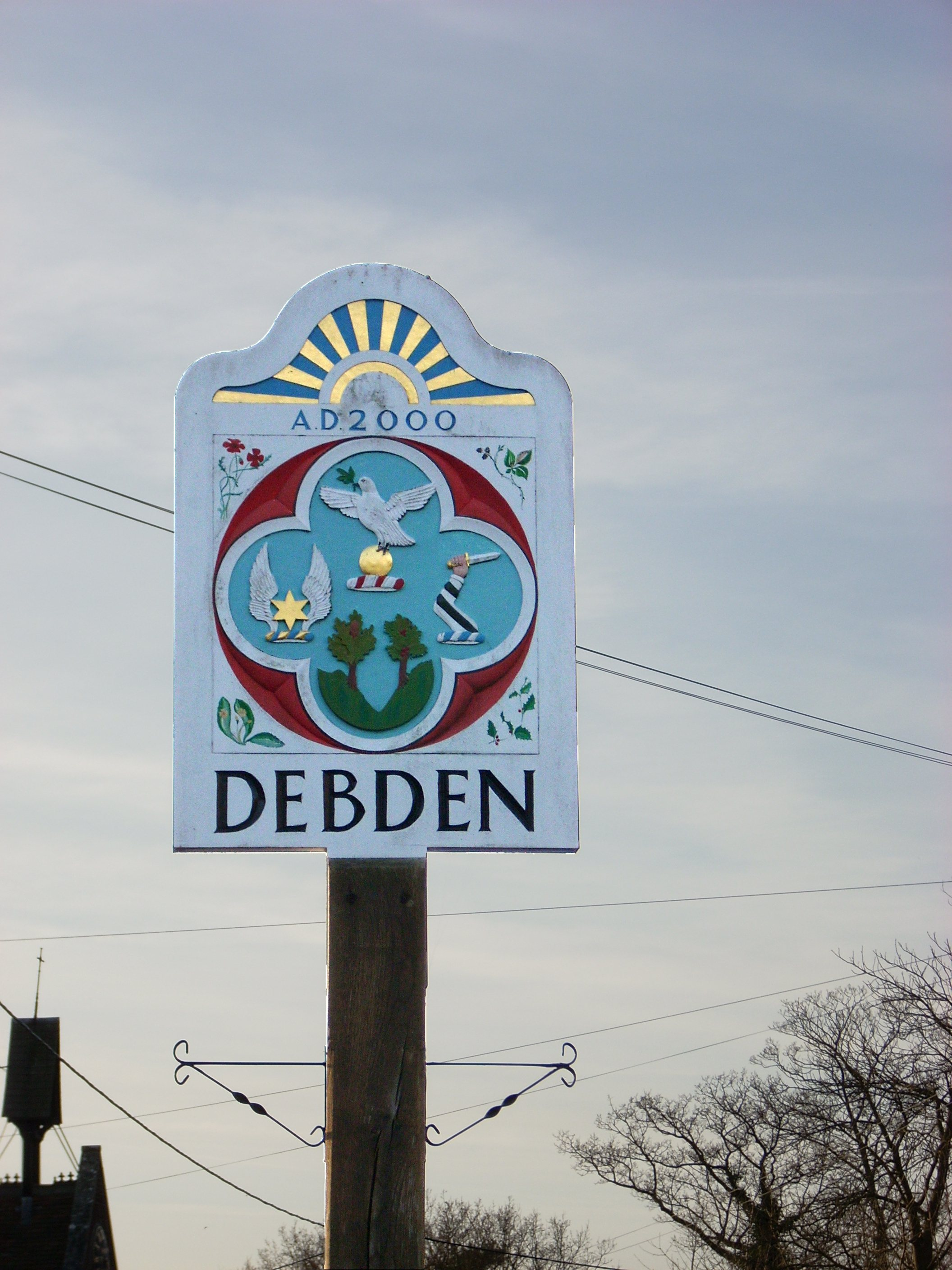
Village sign

== Notable people ==
- Henry Vane the Younger (1613–1662), an English politician, statesman, and colonial governor.

== See also ==
- The Hundred Parishes
