= John Gally Knight =

English barrister and politician

Member of Parliament for Aldborough
- In office 1784-1796

Personal details
- Born: John Gally c. 1741
- Died: 20 October 1804 (aged 62–63)
- Relatives: Henry Gally Knight (nephew)
- Education: Trinity Hall, Cambridge

John Gally Knight (c. 1741 – 20 October 1804) was an English barrister who served in the House of Commons from 1784 to 1796.

== Biography ==
He was the eldest son of Rev. Henry Gally, rector of St. Giles-in-the Fields, Holborn, Middlesex and educated at Eton College (1753–57) and Trinity Hall, Cambridge (1757), where he was awarded LLB in 1764 and elected fellow in 1764. He trained in the law at Lincoln's Inn (1756) and was called to the bar in 1765.

He was elected as a Member of Parliament (MP) for Aldborough at a by-election in January 1784, and held the seat until the 1796 general election, which he did not contest.

He was born John Gally, but adopted the Knight name and arms in 1768 on inheriting substantial properties from his mother Elizabeth, sole heiress of the Knight family of Warsop, Firbeck and elsewhere. He inherited Firbeck Hall in Rotherham, which served as his seat.

He was unmarried. His estate descended via his brother to his nephew Henry Gally Knight, himself later an MP for Aldborough.

Parliament of Great Britain
Preceded by Charles Mellish; Sir Samuel B. Fludyer, Bt	Member of Parliament for Aldborough; 1784–1796; With: Sir Samuel B. Fludyer, Bt 1781 – March 1784; Richard Pepper Arden 1784–1790; Trench Chiswell 1790–1797	Succeeded by Charles Duncombe; Trench Chiswell
