= Debden Hall, Uttlesford =

Former country house in Essex, England

Coordinates: 51.97828°N 0.25408°E

There was another Debden Hall in Essex, in Epping Forest

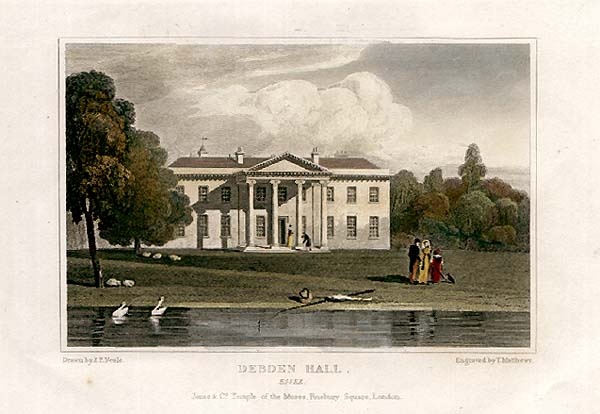
Debden Hall, Uttlesford, Essex

Debden Hall was a country house in the north-west of the county of Essex, in England. It was demolished in 1936.

Debden, Uttlesford is a village, parish and manor south of Saffron Walden. It was purchased by Richard Chiswell around 1700. He died in 1751, having built up the estate. In 1795 Richard Muilman Trench Chiswell had Henry Holland remodel the existing hall. Through his daughter's marriage to Sir Francis Vincent, 8th Baronet, the hall passed in the family line to Sir Francis Vincent, 10th Baronet. On his death in 1880, Debden Hall passed to his daughter, Blanche Cely-Trevilian.

Blanche Cely-Trevilian sold the Hall (1882), to William Fuller-Maitland; he disposed of it to John Ashton Fielden. It came to Donald Smith, 1st Baron Strathcona and Mount Royal, and on his death (1914) passed to his daughter Margaret Smith, 2nd Baroness Strathcona and Mount Royal. For reasons of cost the Hall was not maintained, leading to its demolition, and the breakup of the estate.

Part of the site is now owned by Sukh Chamdal, CEO of Egg Free Cake Box. He was fined £200,000 for cutting down trees on the estate to make a driveway to his new house on the site.
