= Listed buildings in Firbeck =

Firbeck is a civil parish in the Metropolitan Borough of Rotherham, South Yorkshire, England. The parish contains 20 listed buildings that are recorded in the National Heritage List for England. All the listed buildings are designated at Grade II, the lowest of the three grades, which is applied to "buildings of national importance and special interest". The parish contains the village of Firbeck and the surrounding countryside. Most of the listed buildings are houses and associated structures, farmhouses and farm buildings, and the others consist of a church and a memorial in the churchyard, two ice houses, a bridge and an integral weir, and an external cellar.

== Buildings ==
Name and location	Photograph	Date	Notes
Firbeck Hospital; 53.39295°N 1.15027°W	—	Late 16th century	A country house named Firbeck Hall and later used for other purposes, it is in limestone with slate roofs. The oldest part has two storeys and an attic, and contains a canted bay window. To its left is a large square two-storey block added in the 18th century, with fronts of seven and eight bays. Alterations were made in the 1820s and 1830, which included the addition of numerous shaped and stepped gables. There is a Doric portico with a round arch, a keystone and an entablature. Most of the windows are sashes in architraves with moulded sills and small keystones. On the right return is a square turret with four shaped gables.
Manor Farmhouse; 53.39031°N 1.15421°W	—	Late 16th to early 17th century	The farmhouse is in limestone, with quoins, and a pantile roof with moulded gable copings and gadrooned finials. There are two storeys and attics, and a T-shaped plan, consisting of a five-bay main range, and a cross-wing to the left on a chamfered plinth. Most of the windows are mullioned, some with hood moulds.
Farm building, Park Hill Farm; 53.38645°N 1.15786°W	—	Early 17th century	The farm building is in limestone with quoins and a pantile roof. There are two storeys and an elongated plan. The openings include windows, some of which are mullioned, a passageway with a basket arch and a chamfered surround, doorways, and slit vents, and there are two flights of external steps.
Haven Farmhouse; 53.38939°N 1.13430°W	—	18th century (probable)	The older part of the farmhouse is the rear range, the front range added in the mid 19th century. The farmhouse is in limestone, with an eaves band, and a pantile roof with coped gables and shaped kneelers. There are two storeys, a front range of three bays, and a parallel rear range projecting to the left. The doorway has a fanlight, and a cornice on brackets, and the windows on the front are casements, those on the ground floor with hood moulds. In the rear range is a French window, and at the rear is a horizontally-sliding sash window.
Knight family memorial 53.38985°N 1.15633°W	—	18th century	The memorial consists of a monumental gravestone in the churchyard of St Martin's Church. It is in limestone, and consists of a moulded plinth and cornice with inscriptions. On the top of the cornice are two sculpted winged cherubs. On the plinth is an obelisk with a square base and a vase carved within a panel.
3 Lime Avenue; 53.39099°N 1.15247°W	—	Late 18th century	A limestone house with quoins, and a pantile roof with coped gables and shaped kneelers. There are two storeys and three bays. On the front is a doorway, and a central casement window in the upper floor, and the other windows are horizontally-sliding sashes.
15, 17 and 19 New Road; 53.39043°N 1.15470°W	—	Late 18th century	A row of three limestone houses with stone slate eaves courses and a pantile roof. There are two storeys, seven bays, and a continuous outshut and other extensions at the rear. In the centre is a doorway with a stone slab hood on brackets, and the windows are casements.
Stable block, Firbeck Hospital; 53.39367°N 1.14955°W	—	Late 18th century (probable)	The stable block, later used for other purposes, is in limestone, with an eaves band, a parapet, false gables with arrow slits, and hipped slate roofs. There is a U-shaped plan, with a front range of two storeys and five bays, the end bays projecting slightly. In the centre is a carriage entrance with a basket arch, piers, an impost band, and a keystone. It contains iron gates, and above them is a shaped gable containing a clock face. The outer bays contain sash windows. The rear wings have one storey and eight bays each, the right wing with round-arched doorways, and the left wing with a coach house.
Ice house off Salt Hill Bridle Path; 53.38837°N 1.14521°W	—	Late 18th century	The ice house is in red brick and stone. It has a circular plan, 5 metres (16 ft) in diameter, and a shallow domed roof. The entrance passage has been demolished.
External cellar, Stone Mill; 53.40140°N 1.16765°W	—	Late 18th century (probable)	The cellar is in magnesian limestone, and has a segmental-arched opening set into a grass bank. Inside is a vault lined with stone shelves.
St Martin's Church; 53.39001°N 1.15618°W		1820	Alterations were made to the church in 1887, and the tower was replaced in 1900. The church is in limestone with slate roofs, and consists of a nave, a north aisle, a south porch, a chancel with an apsidal east end, and a northwest tower. The tower has angle buttress strips, and contains round-headed windows. At the top is a corbel table, a parapet with a cornice, a pyramidal lead roof, and a weathervane. The porch has a coped gable, and contains a chamfered round-arched entrance with a hood mould, and a niche containing a statue of Saint Peter. On the south wall of the chancel is a sundial dated 1821.
Bridge and weir 53.39295°N 1.14783°W	—	Early 19th century	The bridge and weir cross Lamb Lane Dyke and are in limestone. The bridge consists of a single elliptical arch, with projecting voussoirs, a double keystone, a band, and a coped parapet. The parapet ramps down from the centre and curves to rounded end piers. The weir is at the rear, and is integral with the bridge.
Home Farmhouse and farm buildings 53.39507°N 1.14840°W	—	Early 19th century	A model farm, altered in 1881, consisting of a farmhouse and farm buildings around a quadrangular yard. The buildings are limestone with pantile roofs, and mainly in one storey. The farmhouse has two storeys, and contains casement windows and a French window. The other buildings include a five bay barn with quoins, an elliptical-arched wagon entry and slit vents, a stable block with mounting steps, an eight-bay cowhouse with segmental-arched doorways and windows, and a pigsty. At the front is a wall with an arcade of nine pig troughs.
Ice house, Park Hill Farm; 53.38570°N 1.16083°W	—	Early 19th century (probable)	The ice house is in limestone with a brick vault. It consists of an earth-covered mound with an arched doorway flanked by wing walls. A short tunnel leads to a square-headed opening into an underground vault.
West Lodge, Firbeck Hospital; 53.39404°N 1.15334°W		Mid 19th century	The lodge at the entrance to the drive is in limestone with a stone slate roof and an L-shaped plan. There are two storeys and fronts of two bays. The fronts facing the road and the drive contain mullioned windows and coped ogee-shaped gables with kneelers. At the rear is a doorway with a chamfered surround and a Tudor arched lintel, and above is a single-light window with a cornice.
Cartshed and granary, Home Farm; 53.39514°N 1.14790°W	—	Mid 19th century	The cartshed and granary, later used for other purposes, are in limestone and have a pantile roof with a coped gable and shaped kneelers on the right. There are two storeys and three bays, and a single-storey two-bay extension on the left. The building contains square-headed openings under relieving arches, and casement windows under arched heads, and on the right return are external steps.
Yew Tree House; 53.39065°N 1.15408°W	—	Mid 19th century	A limestone house with oversailing stone slate eaves and verges, and a stone slate roof. There are two storeys, three bays, and a rear wing on the left. The central doorway has a bracketed wooden hood, and the windows are casements with segmental-arched heads and shutters.
23, 25 and 27 New Road; 53.39021°N 1.15519°W	—	Mid to late 19th century	A row of three limestone houses on a plinth, with oversailing eaves, and a Welsh slate roof. There are two storeys and a symmetrical front of three bays. In the centre is a timber gabled porch with bargeboards and shaped brackets and a decorative finial, and the windows are casements.
64 New Road; 53.38823°N 1.15959°W	—	1876	A pair of cottages in cottage orné style, later combined into a house. It is in limestone, with quoins and a pantile roof. There is one storey and attics, and three bays, the right bay projecting and gabled. The doorway has a double-chamfered surround and a canopy on brackets. The windows are casement windows with lozenge-shaped panels and diagonal glazing bars in the corners, and in the attics are gabled dormers. All the gables have pierced bargeboards.
79 New Road; 53.38845°N 1.15940°W	—	1876	A cottage in cottage orné style, it is in limestone and has a hipped tile roof. There is a single storey and an attic, and a front of three bays. In the centre is a gabled porch with a scalloped bargeboard and a pendant boss. The windows are casement windows with lozenge-shaped panels and diagonal glazing bars in the corners, and in the attics are gabled dormers.
