= Trench Chiswell =

English politician

Richard Muilman Trench Chiswell (baptised 23 March 1734 – 3 February 1797) was an English banker, antiquarian and MP. He committed suicide after his bankruptcy.

== Life ==
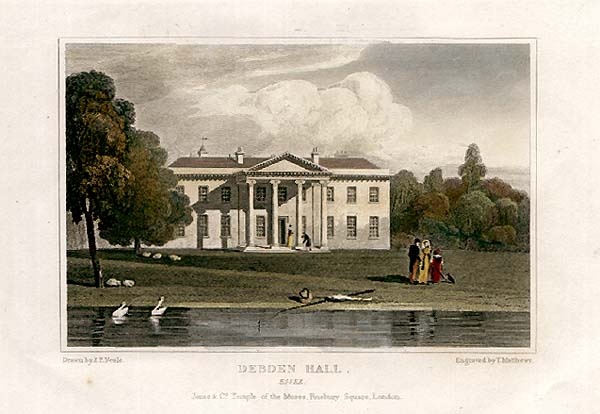
Debden Hall, Uttlesford

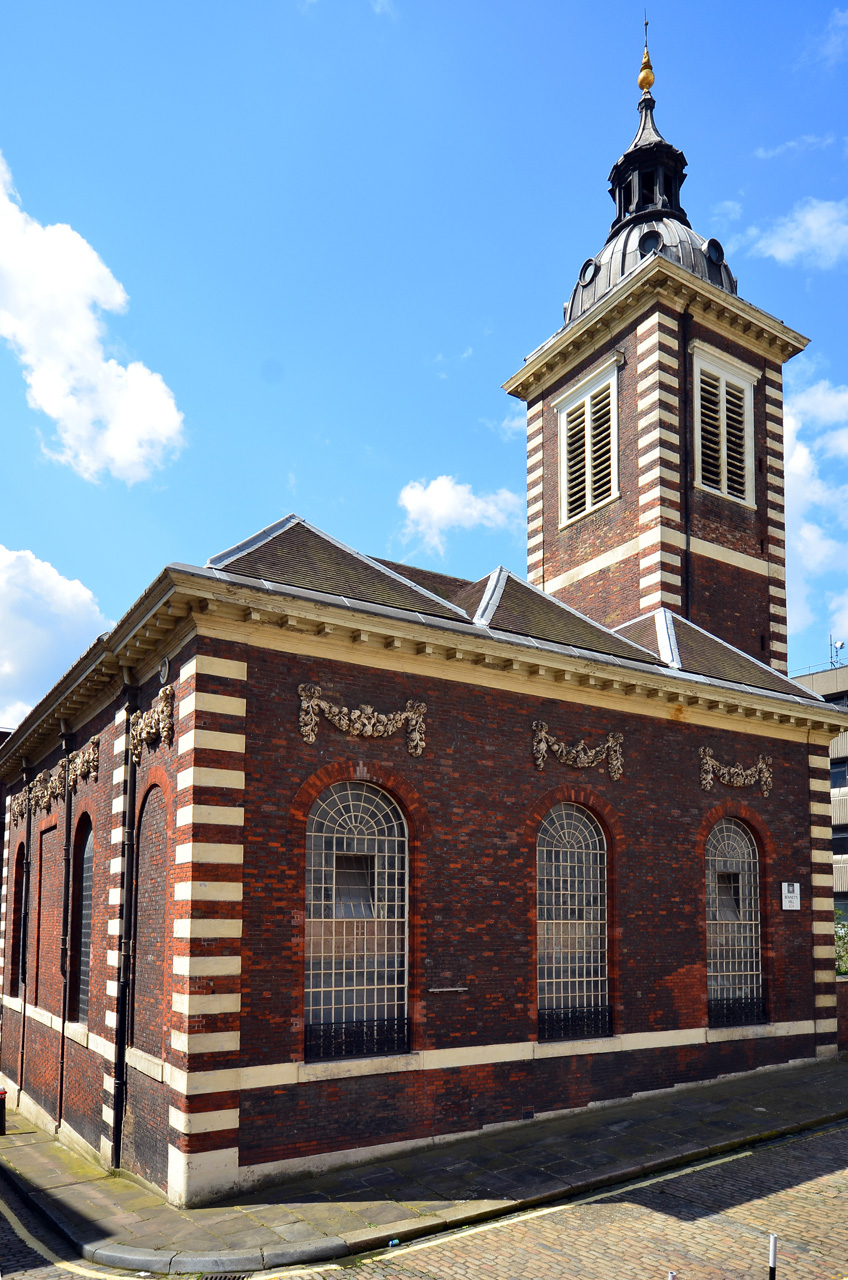
Henry Muilman' marriage with Phillips took place at St Benet's, Paul's Wharf.

Richard Muilman was born as the son of the Dutch merchant/banker Peter Muilman (Amsterdam, 10 December 1706-Marylebone, 4 February 1790) who settled in Bishopsgate in 1722, close to London's Dutch Church, the remaining fragment of Austin Friars. Peter Muilman married Mary Chiswell in 1734 and owned Kirby Hall, Essex near Great Yeldham.

For many years his father and uncle Henry cooperated with their brothers, bankers in Amsterdam. They traded on Denmark, Russia, Dutch Guiana and the Caribbean. In 1757 Richard joined the Muilman company, which cooperated with the Clifford family in speculating on the rise of EIC-stocks and in the circulation of bills of exchange but the Cliffords were hit by the credit crisis of 1772.

Richard assumed the extra surnames of Trench and Chiswell by royal licence on 28 November 1772 after the death of his mother's brother, Richard Chiswell, when he inherited a fortune of £120,000 (£23 million as of 2025) and Debden Hall in Essex. He was appointed High Sheriff of Essex for 1776. Chiswell made some literary collections relating to the history of Essex, and he was elected a Fellow of the Society of Antiquaries in 1791. He is said to have owned some "fine Caxtons" which were accidentally burned.

He was elected MP for Aldborough, Yorkshire, in 1790, and served until his death, supporting the government of William Pitt the Younger. In 1792 he voted against the Slave Trade Bill. His mind became deranged as a result of unsuccessful speculations in the West Indies in which he may have lost £450,000 (£86.1 million as of 2025). He shot himself in his country house.

== Family ==
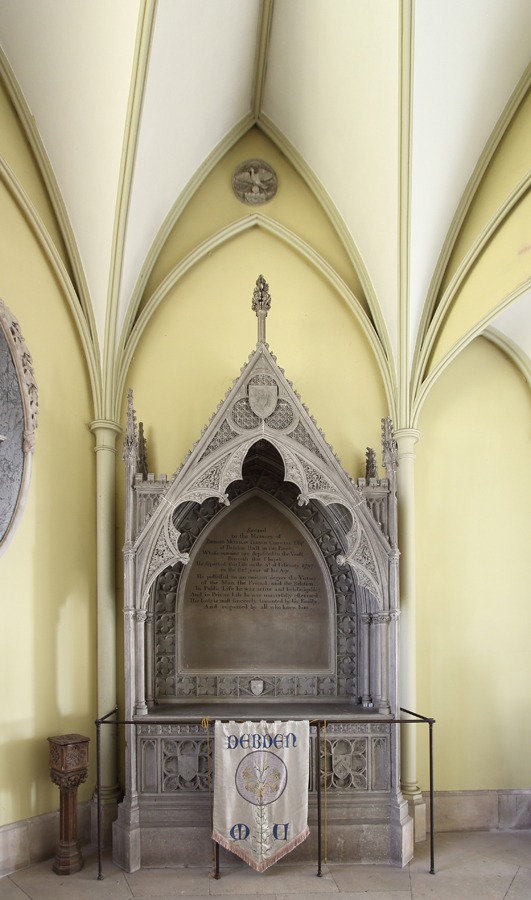
His monument by John Carter in St Mary the Virgin and All Saints, Debden

Keen on local history Peter Muilman supported financially the publication of A New and Complete History of Essex, From a Late Survey; Compared with the most celebrated Histories Containing, A natural and pleasing Description of the Several Divisions of the County, With Their Products and Curiosities of every Kind Both Ancient and Modern. And a Review of the most remarkable Events and Revolutions therein, from the earliest Era down to 1769 to be issued in 36 fortnightly parts. The author seems to have been Henry Dudley.

Henry Muilman (27 August 1698 – 4 May 1772) married a notorious courtisane Teresia Constantia Phillips in 1724. It has been speculated that the marriage was ended after her past was discovered. Muilman refused to pay her the money that had been agreed as part of the separation and a dispute began. After his divorce he married Anne Darnell in 1728. The long-running court case between Phillips and Muilman was settled in 1748.

In 1756, Richard married Mary (c1732-1807), a daughter of Dr James Jurin; he lived at Portland Place. Their only child, also Mary, married the British Resident in Venice, Sir Francis Vincent, 8th Baronet. Chiswell's first cousin, Anna Muilman, married John Julius Angerstein.

Parliament of Great Britain
Preceded by John Gally Knight; Richard Pepper Arden	Member of Parliament for Aldborough; 1790–1797; With: John Gally Knight 1790–96; Charles Duncombe 1796-97	Succeeded by Charles Duncombe; John Blackburn
