= Rook End =

Hamlet in Essex, England

Coordinates: 51.968°N 0.257°E

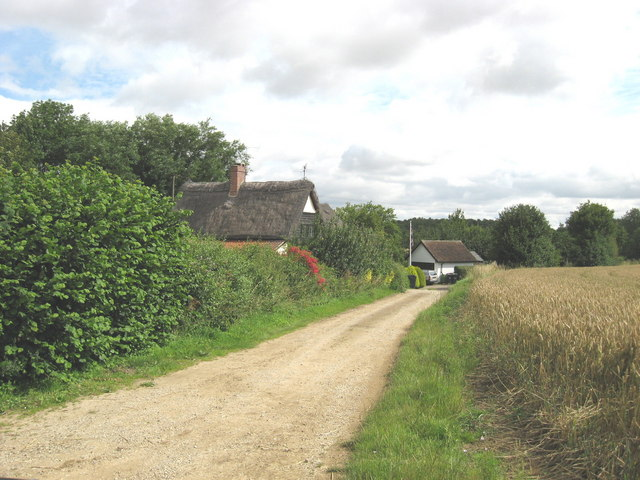

- Location within Essex
- Civil parish: Debden
- District: Uttlesford
- Shire county: Essex
- Region: East
- Country: England
- Sovereign state: United Kingdom
- Police: Essex
- Fire: Essex
- Ambulance: East of England

Rook End is a hamlet in the civil parish of Debden, in the Uttlesford district, in the county of Essex, England. Rook End contains 3 listed buildings, including Rook End Cottage and two small 18th-century timber-framed and plastered cottages.
