= RAF Firbeck =

Royal Air Force base in Yorkshire, England

RAF Firbeck
- Firbeck, South Yorkshire in England

Site information
- Type: Royal Air Force relief landing ground
- Owner: Air Ministry
- Operator: Royal Air Force
- Controlled by: RAF Army Cooperation Command

Location
- Shown within South Yorkshire RAF Firbeck (the United Kingdom)
- Coordinates: 53°23′15″N 001°09′45″W

Site history
- Built: 1940
- In use: 1940 - 1948
- Battles/wars: European theatre of World War II

Airfield information
- Elevation: 65 metres (213 ft) AMSL
Runways
Direction	Length and surface
00/00	Concrete
00/00	Concrete
00/00	Concrete

Royal Air Force Firbeck or more simply RAF Firbeck is a former Royal Air Force relief landing ground located west of Firbeck, South Yorkshire, England.

The airfield was opened in September 1940 and was closed in 1948, during this time it was mainly used as a relief landing ground (RLG) and small planes such as the Westland Lysander and the Taylorcraft Auster. After the Second World War had ended the airfield was used by two Royal Air Force (RAF) gliding schools.

== History ==
The airfield was first constructed in 1935 in conjunction with a country club opening up at Firbeck Hall. Cyril Nicholson invested money into the Jacobean hall and its surroundings which attracted the rich and glamorous of that time. The then Prince of Wales (the future Edward VIII) also flew into the airfield in his own de Havilland Dragon Rapide aircraft (the very aircraft that he flew to London on his accession to King in 1936). On the outbreak of war, the airfield was pressed into service for the Royal Air Force under the Emergency Powers Act.

The first squadron to use the airfield was No. 613 Squadron RAF which had moved from RAF Netherthorpe on 7 September 1940. The unit had detachments at various other airfields such as RAF Clifton, RAF Netherthorpe, RAF Sutton Bridge, RAF Doncaster and RAF Martlesham Heath initially flying the Westland Lysander Mk. II before the addition of the Mk. III in January 1941. The squadron moved to RAF Doncaster on 8 July 1941. A short time after this on 19 July 1941 No. 2 Squadron RAF moved in from RAF Sawbridgeworth flying the Lysander II for four days before moving back to Sawbridgeworth.

Between July 1941 and 1 November 1945 Firbeck was used as a relief landing ground for No. 25 Elementary Flying Training School RAF (EFTS).

The next are both air observation post squadron which were used by RAF Army Cooperation Command to help spot enemy positions. The first of these squadron was No. 654 Squadron RAF which started using RAF Firbeck from 15 September 1942 flying the Taylorcraft Auster Plus C2 and the Auster I before moving to RAF Bottisham on 20 November 1942 and the second was No. 659 Squadron RAF which was formed at the airfield on 30 April 1943 and flew the Auster III before moving to RAF Clifton on 17 August 1943.

In 1944 No. 28 Gliding School RAF took up residence with Cadet gliders staying until January 1946. However, after a short amount of time No. 24 Gliding School RAF took over the empty space in May 1946 and they stayed until February 1948. The airfield closed during 1948.

== Current use ==
There is a memorial at the airfield where the aircraft repair shop used to be located. The airfield is currently open land.
