= RAF Clifton =

Royal Air Force base in Yorkshire, England

RAF Clifton RAF York RAF Rawcliffe
- Clifton Without, North Yorkshire in England

Site information
- Type: Royal Air Force station
- Owner: Air Ministry
- Operator: Royal Air Force
- Controlled by: RAF Bomber Command

Location
- Shown within North Yorkshire RAF Clifton (the United Kingdom)
- Coordinates: 53°58′50″N 001°06′28″W

Site history
- Built: 1936
- In use: 1936-1939 Civilian Use; 1939-1946 RAF use 1946-1955 Civilian Use
- Battles/wars: European theatre of World War II

Airfield information
- Elevation: 14 metres (46 ft) AMSL
Runways
| Direction | Length and surface |
|---|---|
| 00/00 | Asphalt |
| 00/00 | Asphalt |
| 00/00 | Asphalt |

Royal Air Force Clifton, or more simply RAF Clifton, is a former Royal Air Force station located 1.5 miles (2.4 km) north west of York city centre and 2.6 miles (4.2 km) south west of Haxby, North Yorkshire, England.

The airfield was opened in 1936 as a civilian airport but by 1939 the station was taken by the Royal Air Force (RAF) for use in the Second World War and was returned in 1946 when the airport reopened. However, in 1955 the airfield was closed for good. The airfield during wartime was also known as RAF York and RAF Rawcliffe.

== Station history ==
The airfield was originally York Municipal Aerodrome which opened in 1936 after an air circus had used the site previously but on 1 September 1939 the site was requisitioned by the RAF for Bomber Command.

The first squadron to use the airfield was No. 613 Squadron RAF between 7 September 1940 and 8 July 1941 as a detachment while the main squadron were at RAF Firbeck. The airfield was empty until No. 4 Squadron RAF arrived on 27 August 1940 originally with the Westland Lysander III/IIIA adding the Curtiss Tomahawk IIA in April 1942 and the North American Mustang I in May 1943.

On 27 June 1942 No. 169 Squadron RAF arrived with the Mustang I as a detachment from RAF Doncaster. The squadron stayed until 12 October 1942.

- No. 169 Squadron RAF between 15 November 1942 and 18 December 1942 with the Mustang.
- No. 4 Squadron RAF between 12 March 1943 and 20 March 1943 with the Tomahawk and Mustang.
- No. 231 Squadron RAF between 21 March 1943 and 6 July 1943 with the Mustang I. The squadron had a detachment at RAF Ballyhalbert.
- No. 659 Squadron RAF between 17 August 1943 and 23 April 1944 with a brief change to RAF Burn on 31 December 1943. The squadron flew the Auster III before upgrading to the Mk. IV during March 1944.
- No. 658 Squadron RAF between 29 August 1943 and 1 January 1944 with the Taylorcraft Auster III.
- No. 48 Maintenance Unit RAF.

During its lifetime Clifton was used by RAF Bomber Command, RAF Army Cooperation Command, Fleet Air Arm, RAF Fighter Command and RAF Maintenance Command.

== Accidents ==
A Handley Page Halifax Mk VII JP203 crashed on approach to Clifton on the 8 June 1945. The aircraft had left Hooton Park, Cheshire on route to Clifton for scrapping by No. 48 Maintenance Unit RAF. Both crew members on board were killed.

== Current use ==
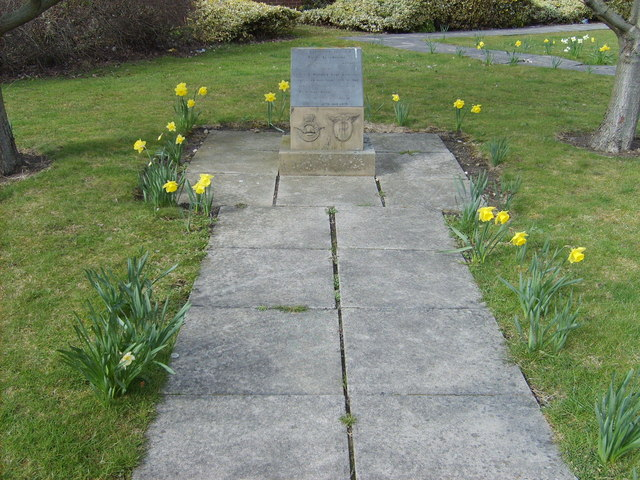
Memorial plaque to the former aerodrome

The airfield site now forms a housing estate, industrial estate, shopping centre and local nature reserve (Clifton Backies).

However, there are two stubs of the original runways still visible north of the A1237 near the roundabout leading to the shopping centre. There is also a stub of another runway and taxiway visible to the south of the A1237 just west of Wigginton Road.

== See also ==
- List of former Royal Air Force stations
