= Debden Green =

Hamlet in Debden, Uttlesford, Essex, England

Coordinates: 51.964°N 0.299°E

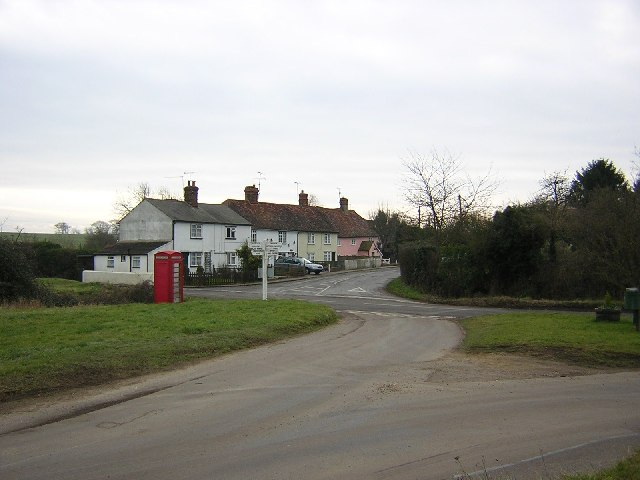
- Debden Cross, the heart of Debden Green

- Location within Essex
- Civil parish: Debden
- District: Uttlesford
- Shire county: Essex
- Region: East
- Country: England
- Sovereign state: United Kingdom
- Police: Essex
- Fire: Essex
- Ambulance: East of England

Debden Green is a hamlet in the civil parish of Debden, in the Uttlesford district of Essex, England and 2 miles (3 km) west from the town of Thaxted. It is centred around a crossroads on the main Debden to Thaxted road where the road from Henham and Hamperden End intersects at a point known as Debden Cross. A byway or green lane, called Pepples Lane, connects Debden Cross with Wimbish, 3 miles (5 km) to the north.

The source of the River Chelmer, River Cam/Granta and River Pant all rise in the vicinity of Debden Green.

Until the 1980s, Debden Green had its own post office and grocery store. There are 12 Grade II listed buildings in the hamlet.

A windmill once stood in Monks Lane. The post mill was built around 1719, possibly to replace an earlier mill, and was demolished during the First World War or immediately afterwards.

Debden Green used to have a slaughter house (now Pages Farm). The single track road (signposted as Sibbards & Pages Farm Lane) connecting Pepples Lane with Debden Cross was known locally as Slaughterhouse Lane.
