= Richard Chiswell =

English merchant and politician

Richard Chiswell (1673 – 14 May 1751) was a wealthy English merchant and politician who sat in the House of Commons from 1715 to 1722.

== Early life ==
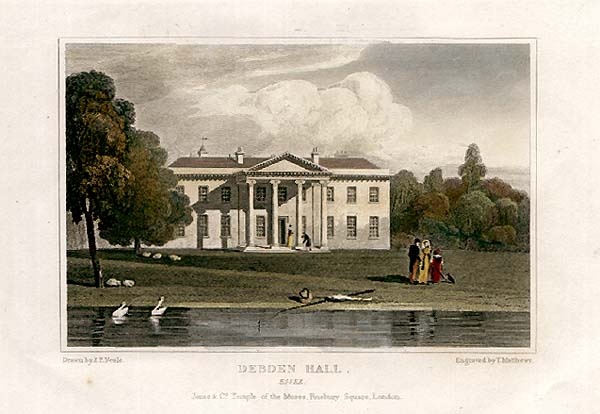
Debden Hall, Uttlesford, Essex

Chiswell was the eldest surviving son of Richard Chiswell, a bookseller of London, and his second wife Mary Royston, daughter of Richard Royston, bookseller to royalty. He was educated at St Paul's School. He was a merchant trading with Turkey and between 1696 and 1698, he made three journeys through the Middle East, which he documented. He married Mary Trench, the daughter and coheiress of merchant Thomas Trench of London by a licence dated 27 May 1702. His father died in 1711. In 1714 he was appointed a director of the Bank of England until 1721. He purchased Debden Hall, near Saffron Walden, in 1715.

== Political career ==
Chiswell was elected as Whig Member of Parliament (MP) for Calne in Wiltshire at the 1715 general election. In November 1721 he made his only speech opposing a clause allowing the navy to sink any ship coming from a plague infested place. This was a concern to the Levant merchants as there was always plague somewhere in Turkey and many ships could not be notified of the new law in time. Chiswell was not entirely loyal to the government and did not stand at the 1727 general election, probably because his sponsors would not support him.

== Later life and legacy ==
Chiswell considerably improved the estate at Debden Hall. He died on 14 May 1751. He and his wife had three sons and two daughters. He left his whole property to his son Richard. When this Richard died in 1772 Debden Hall was inherited by his sister's son, Richard Muilman, who adopted the surname Chiswell.

Parliament of Great Britain
Preceded by William Northey; William Hedges	Member of Parliament for Calne; 1715–1722; With: Sir Orlando Bridgeman, Bt	Succeeded by Benjamin Haskins Stiles; George Duckett
