= Hamperden End =

Hamlet in Essex, England

Coordinates: 51.9536°N 0.2865°E

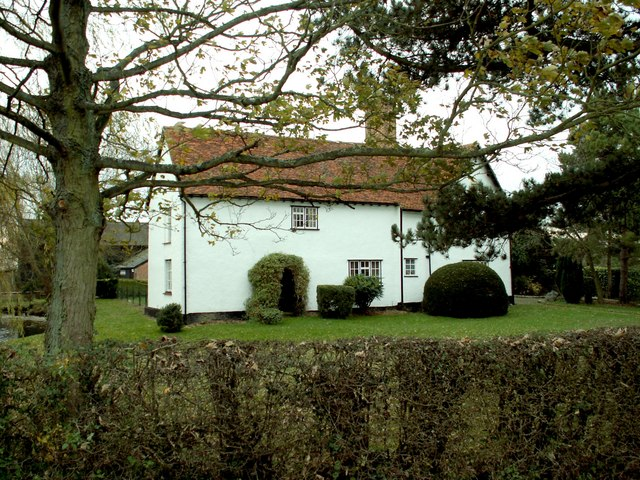
- Farmhouse at Scotts Farm

- Location within Essex
- Civil parish: Debden
- District: Uttlesford
- Shire county: Essex
- Region: East
- Country: England
- Sovereign state: United Kingdom
- Police: Essex
- Fire: Essex
- Ambulance: East of England

Hamperden End is a hamlet in the civil parish of Debden, in the Uttlesford district, in the county of Essex, England. Debden Green is northeast and Widdington is west. Hamperden End has a Caravan Site.
