= Frida =

Frida, Frieda, or Freida may refer to:

== People and fictional characters ==
- Frida (given name), any of several people or characters
  - Frida Kahlo (1907–1954), Mexican painter
- Frieda (Peanuts), a character in the comic strip Peanuts
- Frieda (surname), any of several people or characters
- Afroditi Frida (born 1964), Greek singer
- Frida (singer) (born 1945), stage name of Anni-Frid Lyngstad of the pop band ABBA

== Arts and entertainment ==
- Frida (2002 film), about artist Frida Kahlo
  - Frida (soundtrack), for the 2002 film
- Frida (2024 film), a documentary about Frida Kahlo
- Frida: A Biography of Frida Kahlo, a 1983 book by Hayden Herrera
- Frida (album), a 1971 album by Frida Lyngstad
- Frida (opera), a 1991 opera based on the life of Frida Kahlo
- Frieda (play), a 1946 play by Ronald Millar
- Frieda (film), a 1947 British postwar drama
- Frida (ballet), 2020, based on the life of Frida Kahlo

== Places ==
- Frieda (Werra), a river in Germany
- 722 Frieda, an asteroid

== Other uses ==
- Hurricane Frieda, either of two tropical cyclones
- January 3–4, 2022 nor'easter, also referred to as Winter Storm Frida
- Frida (dog), a rescue dog in the Mexican Navy
- Frida (magazine), a Swedish teens' magazine
- Frieda's Inc., first wholesale produce company in the United States to be founded, owned and operated by a woman
- Frida (company), an American parenthood brand.

== See also ==
- Freda (disambiguation)
