= Freda =

Freda may refer to:

- Freda (given name)
- Freda (surname)
- Freda (character) from The Lord of the Rings film trilogy
- Ford Freda, a motor vehicle introduced in the Japanese market in 1995
- Freda Sandstone, a member of the Oronto Group of sandstones in Wisconsin
- Freda (dog), mascot of the New Zealand Rifle Brigade (Earl of Liverpool's Own) in World War I
- Freda (tortoise), a pet featured in UK children's TV series Blue Peter
- Freda', a pop group from Sweden
- Freda (film), a 2021 film
- "Freda", a 2013 episode of Aqua Teen Hunger Force
- Typhoon Freda, tropical cyclones named Freda

== Places ==
- Freda, Michigan, a former mining town in the Upper Peninsula of Michigan, United States
- Freda Township, Grant County, North Dakota, a township in North Dakota, United States
  - Freda, North Dakota, an unincorporated community and ghost town within the township of the same name
- Freda, Kaunas, a neighbourhood of Kaunas
- Fredrikinkatu, a street in Helsinki, Finland, nicknamed Freda
- 1093 Freda, a minor planet

== See also ==
- includes many people with forename Freda
- Fred (disambiguation)
- Frida (disambiguation), includes Frida, Frieda, and Freida
