= The Causeway Retreat =

Geography
- Location: Osea Island, Essex, England

History
- Founded: 2005–2010

The Causeway Retreat was an addiction treatment centre located on Osea Island near Essex, England, which operated from 2005 to 2010.

== History ==
In 1903, Frederick Nicholas Charrington, who had disinherited himself from his family's brewing business and become a prominent temperance campaigner in London's East End, purchased an island off the coast of Maldon, Essex called Osea Island. During Mr. Charrington's time, the island provided free treatment to those individuals suffering from the ill effects of alcohol and opiate addiction. In return for treatment, clients would remain on the island and work the land. The island was eventually requisitioned by the Admiralty and subsequently turned into a top secret torpedo manufacturing base for both World Wars.

In 2005, Brendan Quinn, a psychiatric nurse with a diploma in addiction treatment, founded The Causeway Retreat for addiction treatment on Osea island, with business partner Nigel Frieda, a music producer. Although The Causeway Retreat was closed down, the island continues to be used as a non-profit retreat by former servicemen and women suffering from PTSD.

== News reports of licensing and other problems ==
In March 2010, The Causeway Retreat was reported to be under investigation by the UK health regulator Care Quality Commission (CQC), which regulates NHS trusts and private clinics. Licensing, staffing, supply of medicines and the role of the charitable arm Changing Lives were listed as areas to be examined.

On 29 April 2010, a further report claimed that the Care Quality Commission had ordered the retreat to close, after it had admitted new patients despite a request not to do so pending the outcome of an investigation into allegations that it was treating patients without a licence under the Care Standards Act. The CQC was reported to have asked the retreat to remove its clients and close its doors within a week. It was also reported that some families whose relatives had been treated at the retreat had launched legal action against it.

The Causeway Retreat was refused registration on 30 September 2010 by the Care Quality Commission, and Brendan Quinn was suspended as a nurse by the Nursing and Midwifery Council on 20 September 2010. On 19 November 2010 Brendan Quinn's Twenty 7 Management, which had run the Causeway Retreat, pleaded guilty at Chelmsford Magistrate's Court, was fined £8,000 plus £30,000 costs, for running an unlicensed hospital. District Judge David Cooper said the firm's standards "would really shame a third world country".
