= Frida (given name) =

Frida (with variants Freda, Freida, Frieda, Frinta) is a feminine given name. In central and eastern Europe, Frida is a short form of compound names containing the Germanic element fried meaning "peace".

== People ==
=== Freda ===
- Freda Betti (1924–1979), French opera singer
- Freda Corbet (1900–1993), British politician
- Freda Dowie (1928–2019), English actress
- Freda Du Faur (1882–1935), Australian mountaineer
- Freda Dudley Ward (1894–1983), English socialite and mistress of future king Edward VIII
- Freda Foh Shen (born 1948), American film, television and theatre actress
- Freda Gardner (1929–2020), former Moderator of the General Assembly of the Presbyterian Church (USA)
- Freda Hoffman Zgodzinski (1914–2012), Anarchist activist
- Freda Jackson (1907–1990), British actress
- Freda James (1911–1988), British tennis player
- Freda Koblick (1920–2011), American acrylic artist and sculptor
- Freda Josephine McDonald (1906–1975), American-born French entertainer, known as Joséphine Baker
- Freda Payne (born 1942), American singer and actress
- Freda Swain (1902–1985), English composer, pianist and music educator
- Freda Warrington, British author
- Freda Warfield, American politician
- Freda Wright-Sorce (1955–2005), American radio broadcaster
- Freda L. Wolfson (born 1954), American judge

=== Freedia ===
- Big Freedia (born 1978), American musician

=== Freida ===
- Freida Lee Mock, American award-winning filmmaker
- Freida McFadden, pseudonym for American thriller novelist
- Freida Pinto (born 1984), Indian actress and model
- Freida J. Riley (1937–1969), American science and math teacher

=== Frida ===
- Frida Argento (born 2000), Swedish actress
- Frida Benneche (1880 – after 1943), American coloratura soprano
- Frida Vyff Bruun (born 1988), Danish politician
- Frida Felser (1841–1941), German opera singer and actress
- Frida Gustavsson (born 1993), Swedish model
- Frida Hansdotter (born 1985), Swedish alpine skier
- Frida Hyvönen (born 1977), Swedish singer-songwriter
- Fríða Ísberg (born 1992), Icelandic novelist, short story writer and poet.
- Frida Kahlo (1907–1954), Mexican painter
- Frida Karlsson (born 1999), Swedish cross-country skier
- Anni-Frid Lyngstad (born 1945), Swedish pop singer and member of ABBA, also known by her mononym Frida
- Frida Maanum (born 1999), Norwegian professional footballer
- Frida Nordin (born 1982), Swedish football midfielder
- Josefine Frida Pettersen (born 1996) Norwegian actress
- Frida E. Polli, Italian-American neuroscientist and entrepreneur
- Friða Saiya, Danish-Faroese singer
- Frida Stéenhoff (1865–1945), Swedish writer and feminist
- Frida Tånghag (born 1989), Swedish politician
- Frida Topno (1925–2018), Indian politician
- Frida Westman (born 2001), Swedish ski jumper

=== Frieda ===
- Frieda Arnold (fl. 1854–fl. 1859), British courtier, dresser (lady's maid) to Queen Victoria of Great Britain.
- Frieda Belinfante (1904–1995), Dutch cellist, conductor, prominent lesbian and member of the Dutch Resistance during World War II
- Frieda Bühner (born 2004), German basketball player
- Frieda Dänzer (1931–2015), Swiss former Alpine skier
- Frieda Hempel (1885–1955), German operatic soprano
- Frieda Inescort (1901–1976), Scottish stage and film actress
- Frieda Keller (1879–1942), a Swiss murderer
- Frieda von Richthofen (1879–1956), German author and wife of the writer D. H. Lawrence
- Frieda Zamba (born 1965), American four-time world surfing champion

== Fictional characters ==
- Frieda, a character from the comic strip Peanuts
- Frieda Petrenko, a character from UK TV series Holby City
- Frida Villarreal, character in the telenovela Entre el amor y el odio

== Animals ==
- Frida (dog), Mexican search and rescue dog

== See also ==
- Freda (disambiguation)
