= Frieda (surname) =

Frieda is a surname. Notable people with the surname include:

- John Frieda (born 1951), British hairstylist
- Leonie Frieda (born 1956), Swedish-born UK-based writer and translator
- Nigel Frieda (born 1952), British record producer and landowner

== See also ==
- Afroditi Frida (born 1964), Greek singer
