= Percy Weaver =

British flying ace of WWII

- Born: 18 September 1916; Bath, England
- Died: 31 August 1940 (aged 23); Osea Island, England
- Cause of death: Killed in action
- Military career
- Allegiance: United Kingdom
- Branch: Royal Air Force
- Service years: 1937–1940
- Rank: Flight Lieutenant
- Unit: No. 56 Squadron
- Conflicts: Second World War: Battle of Britain
- Awards: Distinguished Flying Cross

Percy Weaver, DFC (18 September 1916 – 31 August 1940) was a British flying ace who served in the Royal Air Force (RAF) during the Second World War. He was credited with having shot down nine aircraft.

Born in Bath, Weaver joined the RAF in 1937 on a short service commission. Once his training was complete, he was posted to No. 56 Squadron. On the outbreak of the Second World War, he was serving as a fighter controller at the RAF's North Weald station but in June 1940 was assigned back at No. 56 Squadron. During the Battle of Britain, he achieved a number of aerial victories but was shot down and killed on 31 August 1940, aged 23. His successes were posthumously recognised with an award of the Distinguished Flying Cross.

== Early life ==
Percy Stevenson Weaver was born on 18 September 1916 in Bath in England, one of five childen of Ernest Weaver, a businessman, and his wife. He was educated at Dean Close School in Cheltenham and encouraged by a teacher, became interested in a career in engineering. When his schooling was completed, gained an apprenticeship with the aircraft manufacturer de Havilland. In 1936, he left the service of his employer and joined the Reserve of Air Force Officers (RAFO). In December that year, after two months training at an Elementary and Reserve Flying School, he was commissioned as a pilot officer. In RAF service he was known as 'Squeak'.

Advanced training at No. 8 Flying Training School at Montrose followed and when completed, in September 1937, Weaver was posted to No. 56 Squadron. This was based at the RAF station at North Weald and equipped with the Gloster Gauntlet biplane fighter. Shortly after his arrival there, Weaver relinquished his commission in the RAFO and instead became a pilot officer in the Royal Air Force on a short service commission. In April 1938 No. 56 Squadron began to take on the new Hawker Hurricane fighter.

Four months later Weaver was given a staff post at headquarters of the North Weald station, working as an administrative officer. In February 1939 he took up a new role, this time as a fighter controller at the station's sector operations room. His substantive rank at this time was flying officer although his assignment saw him hold an acting rank as squadron leader.

== Second World War ==
At the time of the outbreak of the Second World War, Weaver was still in his fighter controller post and remained there until June 1940. At this time he returned to No. 56 Squadron at his substantive rank of flying officer. This was back at North Weald with its Hurricanes, having been involved in the aerial fighting during the campaign in France the previous month. Once it was brought up to strength with replacement pilots, the squadron began carrying out escort duties, accompanying Bristol Blenheim light bombers to targets in northern France. From July, it began to carry out interception duties as the Luftwaffe commenced its campaign against the southeast of England.

=== Battle of Britain ===
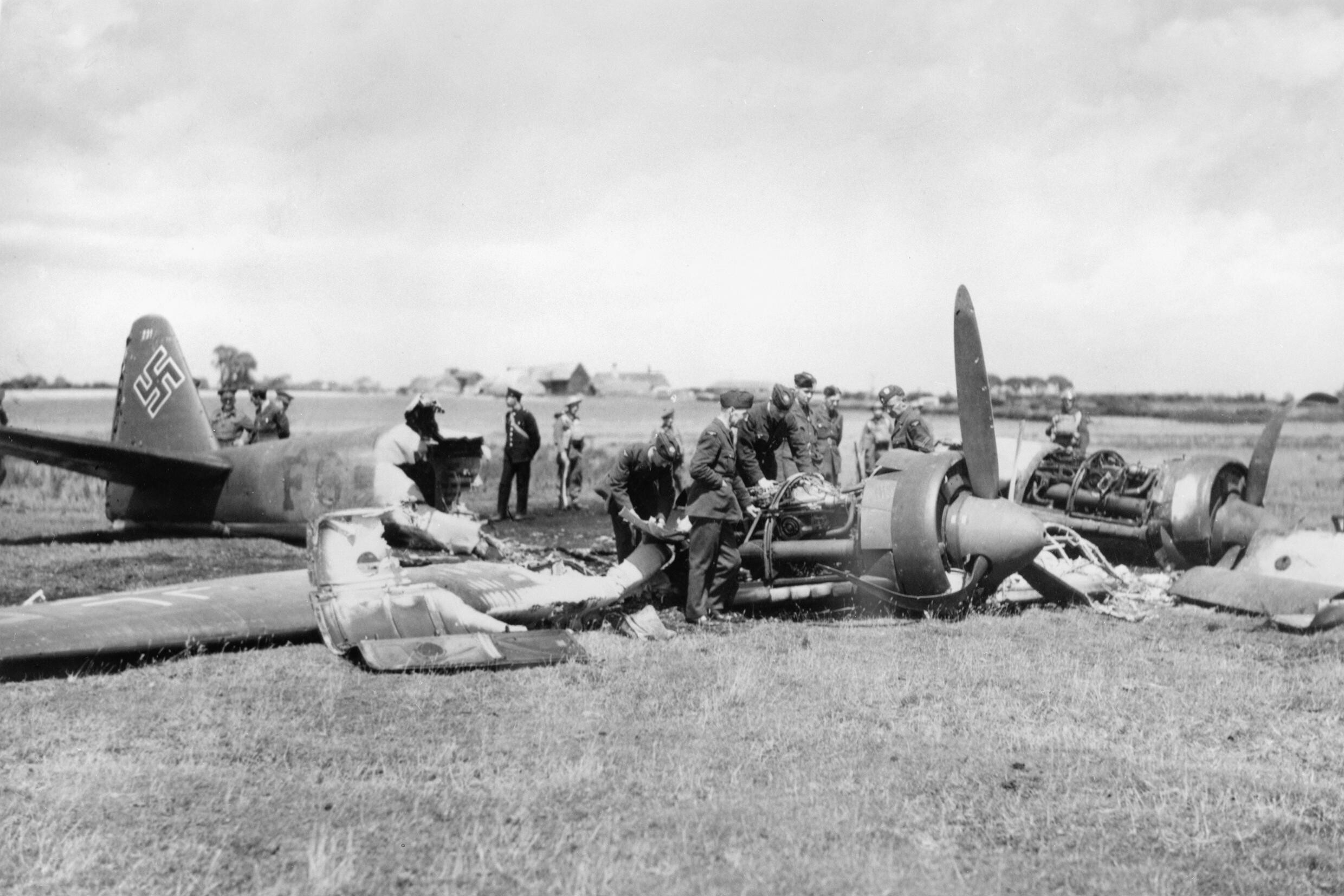
The burnt-out wreckage of the Junkers Ju 88 medium bomber that was shot down on 20 July 1940 by Weaver and other pilots of No. 56 Squadron

On the morning of 20 July Weaver shared in the destruction of a Junkers Ju 88 medium bomber; it crashed to the southwest of Clacton, on Cockett Wick Farm and the crew became prisoners of war. He shot down a Messerschmitt Bf 109 fighter 10 miles (16 km) to the east of Dover on 29 July. Two weeks later, on 12 August, he destroyed a Dornier Do 17 medium bomber to the north of Margate. By this time he was an acting flight lieutenant, taking command of one of the squadron's flights following the transfer of its nominal leader to another unit. The following day he intercepted and shot down a Messerschmitt Bf 110 heavy fighter and damaged a second, both near Rochford. He and another pilot shared in the destruction of a Do 17 to the northeast of Eastchurch on 16 August.

Two days later was The Hardest Day, on which the Luftwaffe mounted a major attack on the RAF's airfields in the southeast of England. In the late afternoon, No. 56 Squadron was scrambled to intercept a raid heading for North Weald and during the resulting engagement, Weaver destroyed a Heinkel He 111 medium bomber over Bradwell. He had already claimed the destruction of a Bf 110 near Ashford earlier in the day.

Weaver destroyed another He 111 near Bradwell on 24 August, and observed its crew baling out. No. 56 Squadron was scrambled to intercept a group of bombers heading for Rochford; Weaver's Hurricane was damaged in the engagement and he had to make a crash landing on farmland near Eastchurch. Later in the day, with Weaver back at North Weald, the squadron was again scrambled. Meeting a group of Bf 109s at around 18,000 feet (5,500 m) over Dover, Weaver destroyed one flown by Feldwebel Schöttle of Jagdgeschwader 54 (Fighter Wing 54). During an patrol over Colchester on 31 August, No. 56 Squadron was surprised by a group of Bf 109s. Weaver was shot down and killed, with his Hurricane seen to crash into River Blackwater off West Point, Osea Island. His commanding officer reported that prior to this, Weaver may have shot down an enemy aircraft. No. 56 Squadron was rested from operations the next day.

Weaver's successes were recognised with a posthumous award of the Distinguished Flying Cross, which was gazetted on 1 October. The citation, which noted that he had been reported missing, was published in The London Gazette and read:

This officer has displayed great courage and leadership. He has destroyed six enemy aircraft. His excellent example has contributed materially to the fine standard that exists in his Squadron.

— London Gazette, No. 34958, 1 October 1940

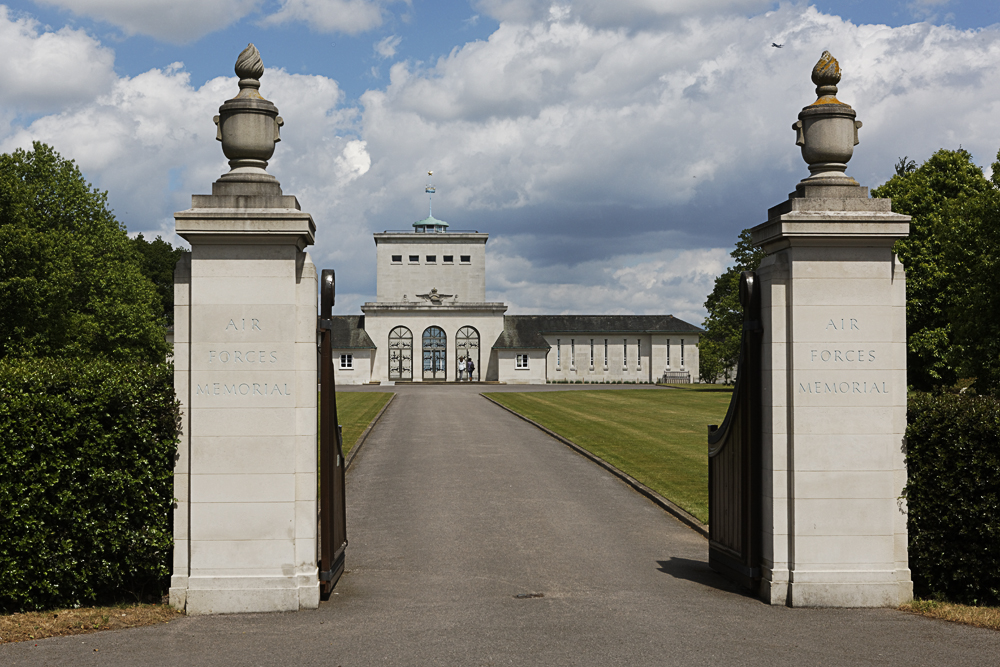
The Air Forces Memorial at Englefield Green in England, where Beaumont is commemorated

Weaver's body was never recovered from the crash site at Blackwater River. With no known grave, he is commemorated on the Runneymeade Memorial at Englefield Green. He is credited with having destroyed nine aircraft, two of which were shared with other pilots, and one damaged.
