= Mention (blogging) =

Means by which a blog or social media post references or links to a user's profile

A mention (also known as @replies or tagging) is a means by which a blog post references or links to a user's profile. This may be done as a matter of getting the attention of (or drawing attention to) another user of a social networking or blogging service, as a matter of replying to the other user's post, or as a matter of "tagging" a user in a post.

== Styles and history ==
=== @ (at sign) ===
The rise to prominence of Twitter from its launch in 2006 gave rise to using the at sign ("@") as a description for directing a public post to a particular user, especially for the purpose of replying to another user's post (i.e., "@janedoe"). Only after the usage of @ as a visual means of directing posts to specific users gained currency among Twitter users did Twitter developers begin to integrate the @ sign as a fundamental conversational tool on the site.

Initially, @ was used by Twitter users occasionally as shorthand for other words, such as location or time. The first person to use @ as a description of directing a post at another user was Robert S. Andersen ("rsa") on 2 November 2006; initially, this usage made use of a space between the @ and the name, followed by a colon and the main content.

The first to propose a general syntax for directly addressing users in posts were Ben Darlow and Neil Crosby, and by January 2007, more Twitter users began to take notice of the practice with various degrees of acceptance; within the year, the convention trended toward combining the @ and a Twitter username (as opposed to a real name) and prepending the combination to the beginning of a post in order to indicate a reply. Ultimately, they became colloquially known as "@replies" for their primary usage as replies to other users' posts. Twitter added support for "@replies" beginning in May 2008, with any combination of @ with a username being turned into a hyperlink to the profile. On March 30, 2009, Twitter updated the feature and renamed it "Mentions" (i.e., to "mention" user "@janedoe") so as to include non-reply posts directed at individual users.

Beginning September 2009, Facebook integrated the at sign as a mentioning feature; typing "@" in a post automatically initiates a drop-down autocomplete list containing names of "friends", groups and pages, which, after one being selected and the post published, links to the profile, group or page.

@-replies started being used on Wikipedia around 2013.

YouTube started introducing @-handles in late 2022.

Distributed social networks and federated networks may use two at signs, the latter to indicate the instance/server which the mentioned users resides on. Example @janedoe@mastodon.social mentions the user janedoe on the server mastodon.social.

=== + (plus sign) ===
The plus sign ("+") was utilized on Google+ to select a user or page.

== Software ==
TinyMCE, an online rich-text editor supports mentions via the Mentions plugin.

CKEditor, an online rich-text editor supports mentions.

GitLab, a DevOps platform supports mentions in merge requests, issues, discussions, etc.

Mastodon supports mentions. User lookup is implemented using the WebFinger protocol.
