= NBACentel =

Satirical social media page

@TheNBACentel
- NBACentel's X avatar
- Formation: July 2022; 4 years ago
- Founded at: Toronto, Ontario, Canada
- Website: X account

NBACentel (sometimes spelled as NBA Centel, often referred to simply as Centel) is a satirical sports journalism account on Twitter. A parody of National Basketball Association (NBA) news aggregator page NBACentral, the Centel page often posts humorous or outlandish faux headlines regarding NBA teams, players, coaches, and personalities. Because of the account's near-identical appearance to NBACentral, many readers are fooled by the account's satirical headlines, mistaking them for genuine sports reporting. Professional NBA players and sports media figures have been tricked by the account, which has since been dubbed "getting Centel'd" a term made by famous NBA Player, Kevin Durant.

Despite explicitly labelling itself as a parody account, NBACentel has been the subject of critique online due to its contribution towards monetized disinformation on social media. The account garnered further attention after it was abruptly shadow-banned from X on February 26, 2025, before being reinstated the following day. As of August 2026, Centel has over 800,000 followers on the platform.

== History ==
NBACentel is an X account directly parodying NBACentral, a basketball news aggregator on the platform. The account was opened in July 2022 under a different handle, and initially posted non-parody NBA content before pivoting to its NBACentel identity in 2023. The owner of the account, an individual from Toronto, Ontario, who remains anonymous, credits his inspiration primarily to "Ballsack Sports", another satirical account that has had fake quotes picked up and spread by legitimate news outlets.

Media writers have suggested that X's incentive structure that allows for monetization on posts by X Premium subscribers has led to the increase in accounts like that of NBACentel.

In July 2023, shortly after NBACentel began posting satirical content, the page successfully fooled Golden State Warriors forward Draymond Green into responding to a fake quote attributed to retired Hall of Famer Kevin Garnett regarding an October 2022 altercation between Green and then-teammate Jordan Poole. This prompted a response from Garnett, who pointed out NBACentel was a fake account and called for X CEO Elon Musk to "fix it". Other players and media members have since been fooled by or otherwise drawn attention to Centel's tweets, such as Kevin Durant, Stephen A. Smith and Colin Cowherd.

=== Notable faux stories ===
One of NBACentel's more notable posts was a story falsely credited to NBA freelance reporter Brandon "Scoop B" Robinson, supposedly quoting Los Angeles Lakers forward LeBron James having stated: "It's crazy, I was bumping to '[Mo Money Mo Problems]' earlier today in the car and I had a weird feeling today was the day the feds will catch Diddy". Robinson stated that his contacts in the entertainment industry congratulated him on the supposed story.

In October 2024, Phoenix Suns forward Kevin Durant referenced Centel in multiple tweets; in one, he replied to a profane X post directed towards him by user @JasonAWilkinson, who responded to a post by NBACentel which included a fake quote attributed to Durant. Durant then replied to Wilkinson, informing him "you got centel'd". This exchange led to a tweet by the Merriam-Webster Dictionary humorously acknowledging the word centel'd as a verb. Around this time, the account had approximately 154,000 followers. Durant also stated that he browses the comments on the account's posts "just to truly see how many dummies come online thinking that they have high IQ".

On November 11, NBACentel posted a fabricated quote from Milwaukee Bucks head coach Doc Rivers, humorously writing that Rivers "have [sic] informed the Bucks he'll start taking coaching 'seriously' now," after the team lost eight of its first 10 games to start the 2024–25 season. Following the post, the Bucks would go on to win nine of their next 10 games and win the 2024 NBA Cup tournament.

NBACentel "broke" a fictitious story on February 21, 2025, reporting that the Dallas Mavericks had banned fans wearing Luka Dončić's jersey from entering the team's home arena, American Airlines Center. This came after multiple legitimate instances of Mavericks fans being escorted out of home games for chanting or holding signs reading "Fire Nico", a negative response to Mavericks general manager Nico Harrison trading Dončić to the Los Angeles Lakers earlier in the month. Centel's faux headline fooled Cowherd, who mentioned the fake story during his show on Fox Sports 1.

=== X shadow ban ===
On the afternoon of February 26, 2025, posts from the @TheNBACentel profile page on X stopped loading, and posts from the account ceased. It was initially unclear if the shadow ban on the account indicated a permanent suspension. As the account appeared shut down, Centel received tribute posts on X from Stephen A. Smith and the official accounts of various NBA teams, posting hashtags such as #RIPCentel and #FreeCentel, and dedicating wins from that night's games in the account's honor.

Though the NBACentel account was transparent in its parody, it did not officially tag itself as a parody account on X, which was speculated by many users to be the reason for the account being shut down. The owner of the "Ballsack Sports" account tweeted that "Centel has told me he just wants to be back and having fun with you guys. We're hoping this a temporary restriction on his account, and not a ban". NBACentel continued to post on Instagram, and its X account was restored the following morning, on February 27. The account had accumulated around 357,000 followers at the time of the temporary ban.

== See also ==
- Timberwolves Brasil – Minnesota Timberwolves fan account
- List of satirical fake news websites
