= Parody account =

Social media account used for parody

A parody account is a type of social media user account that portrays a fictionalized and usually comedic parody of a particular individual, personality, or organization, usually either a fictional character, brand, or public or historical figure. They are commonly found on X and other social media platforms. Parody accounts normally satirize the personality of the person or character being mimicked.

Although parody accounts are generally created as jokes and intended as satire, they are sometimes controversially regarded as impersonation. Social media platforms have taken action to restrict parody accounts on their services to avoid confusing users. They have also on occasion been made the target of legal actions.

== Platform regulation of parody accounts ==
Per X's Terms of Service as of November 2022, parody accounts are now required to indicate their status as a parody account, and are banned on impersonation grounds if they do not comply with this policy. Bluesky has stated that parody accounts are permitted, but must be clearly labeled as such in the account's display name and bio to avoid conflicting with the platform's impersonation policies. Both X and Bluesky have implemented special labels to identify parody accounts in their user interfaces.

== Notable parody accounts ==
- In May of 2010, Los Angeles-based comedian Josh Simpson created a parody account, @BPGlobalPR, which portrayed a comedic caricature of a purposefully inept public relations manager of BP, particularly mocking the company's response to the Deepwater Horizon oil spill. Although Simpson conceived of the initial concept for the account, the account's posts were by his account created by a team of about 15 people, who he said had written many of the posts from the account that he considered to be his favorites. Writing in The New Yorker, Matt Buchanan described @BPGlobalPR as "perhaps the first Twitter parody to receive truly mainstream attention".
- On March 29, 2019, a parody account portraying a fictionalized version of Hatsune Miku, with the handle "@mikumiku_ebooks", tweeted, "i created minecraft". When Minecraft's actual creator, Markus Persson, responded to the post, the account rebuked Persson, calling him a transphobe, and repeating the claim that they had created Minecraft. The response was in reference to controversial comments Persson had made earlier that month which had been characterized as transphobic by critics. The joke that Hatsune Miku had created Minecraft was repeated by fans of the game who disapproved of Persson's comments, becoming a meme which later inspired a variant, "Hatsune Miku wrote Harry Potter", in response to J.K. Rowling's similarly controversial views on transgender individuals.
- In June 2019, politician Devin Nunes sued Twitter and political strategist Elizabeth "Liz" Mair, on defamation charges in response to multiple parody accounts related to him, which portrayed comedic representations of a cow, purportedly owned by Nunes, and Nunes' mother. The latter of the two was suspended by Twitter following a complaint from Nunes' real mother, while the one portraying Nunes' cow continued to operate. In June 2020, a judge ruled that Twitter was immune from Nunes's suit because of Section 230 of the Communications Decency Act. A November 2019 filing to quash a subpoena seeking the identity of the cow account argued that "no reasonable person would believe that Devin Nunes's cow actually has a Twitter account" as cows "do not have the intelligence, language, or opposable digits needed to operate a Twitter account". In November 2020, the United States Justice Department issued a separate subpoena seeking information on the identity of a third parody account about Nunes, @NunesAlt, operated by the same user who had operated the previously suspended account posing as Nunes' mother. Twitter did not comply with the subpoena, with their lawyers writing in a March 2021 filing that the company was concerned that it was "but another mechanism to attack its users’ First Amendment rights". As the story went viral, the popularity of the defendants' accounts soared, gaining more followers than Nunes's own account, which the San Francisco Chronicle cited this as an example of the Streisand effect.
- On May 6, 2019, Twitter suspended the account @AOCPress, a parody account operated by Mike Morrison for being in violation of its "fake account" policy, which prohibited "misleading account information in order to engage in spamming, abusive, or disruptive behavior". The account, posing as Alexandria Ocasio-Cortez, was particularly noted for having tweeted the implication that Ocasio-Cortez politically supported a member of ISIS. Morrison defended the account, stating to the conservative publication Human Events that he believed he had not violated Twitter's policies on parody accounts. In May 2023, the account was unsuspended and gained renewed attention after Elon Musk interacted with its posts. Ocasio-Cortez subsequently cautioned her followers that the account was not affiliated with her.
- On June 26, 2024, a parody account on X called @deerparkpd was created, posing as the Police Department of the fictional village of Deer Park. The account received a verification badge on X, giving the impression that the account was operated by a real police agency, despite being a parody. However, there was a real location in the U.S called Deer Park, located in Texas. Upon learning this, the account owners immediately announced that they were a parody, and their verification status was removed.
