= Frida (company) =

American parenthood brand

FridaBaby, LLC
- Trade name: Frida
- Type: Private
- Industry: Baby care, postpartum assistance, fertility recovery
- Founded: 2007; 19 years ago
- Founder: Kaisa Levine
- Headquarters: Miami, Florida, U.S.
- Area served: Worldwide
- Website: frida.com

FridaBaby, LLC, doing business as Frida, is an American company specialising in baby care, postpartum, and fertility recovery products. Founded by Kaisa Levine in 2007 to distribute a Swedish invention she had retitled the NoseFrida, a tube that is used to extract infants' snot orally, the company was expanded by Chelsea Hirschhorn, who was hired as CEO in 2014 and stayed on through its 2020 acquisition by SC Johnson. The brand has since become known for provocative marketing that avoids euphemisms and calls attention to social stigmas surrounding issues such as breastfeeding.

== Controversies ==
Multiple of Frida's advertisements have been challenged and banned. In 2018, Frida attempted to release a billboard promoting the MomWasher, a peri-bottle for use on a postpartum body, using the slogan "Trust us, your vagina will thank you" in various American towns and cities. Most markets rejected the billboard and proposed using neutral terms such as "bottom" or "body" in place of vagina, ultimately the advert only ran in New York City.

In 2020, Frida released a commercial - given the title "Oscars Ad Rejected" - in which a postpartum mother struggles to use the bathroom, with the company claiming both to the press and in the opening of the video itself that it had been submitted to the American Broadcasting Company for airing on the 91st Academy Awards, to which Frida claims it was rejected for being "graphic" and containing "partial nudity", though Frida insisted that the commercial was not "violent" or "lewd". ABC refused to comment on the matter.

In 2026, Frida would become subject of a boycott for use of sexually provocative marketing in contexts involving infants, dating back to 2020 at least, including taglines printed on boxes of rectal thermometers reading "How about a quickie?", social media posts featuring an illustration of a rectal thermometer being used on an infant claiming "this is closest your husband is going to get to a threesome", an Instagram post depicting a photograph of a baby with white snot on its forehead, resembling semen with the caption "What happens when you pull out too early", and an Instagram post soliciting photographs of infants' feces-stained diapers with "blur not necessary".

In an email disclosed to USA Today, a Frida representative claimed that the intent of the innuendo was to "make awkward and difficult experiences feel lighter", with the company promising on Instagram to retire "legacy assets". The team page was also removed from the website.

Joe Foley of Creative Bloq described the innuendos as an example of a "line in the sand" in relation to the phenomenon of brands using "sassy" personalities for social media marketing. When the controversy was discovered, rival brand Safety 1st released a video on TikTok showcasing its products with the caption "we'll stay in our lane: helping babies." and a description starting with "Baby care doesn’t need to be loud. It needs to be reliable", which was interpreted as a response to the scandal.
