= Timberwolves Brasil =

Minnesota Timberwolves fan account

Timberwolves Brasil (@twolvesbrazil)
- Website type: X account
- Available in: Brazilian Portuguese
- Country of origin: Brazil
- Creator: Rodrigo Barbosa
- Website: twitter.com/twolvesbrazil
- Launched: April 2018; 8 years ago
- Current status: Offline

Timberwolves Brasil was a fan account for the Minnesota Timberwolves of the National Basketball Association that posted under the handle @twolvesbrazil on X (formerly Twitter). The account was created in 2018 by Rodrigo Barbosa, a social media manager based in Rio de Janeiro, Brazil, and not endorsed by the Timberwolves organization.

During the 2023–24 Timberwolves season, the account became a viral phenomenon, attracting media attention for its "unhinged", "disturbing", sometimes "fetishistic" and "extremely NSFW" posts. The account passed 100,000 followers in December 2023.

== History ==
Rodrigo Barbosa has never been to the state of Minnesota but became a Timberwolves superfan after playing NBA Live video games in the early 2000s and following the team through their 2004 playoff run. He created Timberwolves Brasil on Twitter in April 2018.

The account gained traction at the beginning of the 2023–24 season when Barbosa posted a video of a giant wolf sucking on and devouring a leopard-like creature, celebrating the Timberwolves' first win of the season against the Miami Heat. Throughout the season, after every Timberwolves victory, Barbosa posted similar videos of wolves, some of which alluded to sexual fetish content including those from the vore and furry subcultures. He said this was unintentional, remarking "Timberwolves wins are my fetish, my only fetish". The posts are often accompanied by Brazilian Portuguese catchphrases supporting the team, including "O lobo come" ("The wolf eats").

In 2023, GQ described a "larger ecosystem" of Brazil-based NBA fan accounts for teams such as the Phoenix Suns, Toronto Raptors and Golden State Warriors, many of which post similarly risqué content.

As of 13 January 2024, the Timberwolves Brasil X account has been deactivated; it is unclear whether the account will return.

== Reactions ==
Timberwolves Brasil has attracted attention from media outlets, including official NBA accounts, for its shocking and humorous content. As sports blog SB Nation described, "almost everything Timberwolves Brasil posts is sexual, horrifying, and sometimes both." In an article profiling Timberwolves Brasil, Rolling Stone called it "basketball's favorite gonzo account".

On 30 October 2023, the official Timberwolves account quoted one of Timberwolves Brasil's posts with an image expressing the team's shock. In November 2023, Boston Celtics player Oshae Brissett tweeted, "They can't keep getting away with this", in response to a Timberwolves Brasil video posted after the Timberwolves defeated the Celtics.

On 8 May 2024, the official Timberwolves X account would hold a contest offering the prize of a "TWOLVESBRAZIL" jersey to one randomly selected follower who retweeted the post.

== See also ==
- NBACentel
