= Frieda Rapoport Caplan =

American businesswoman (1923–2020)

Frieda Rapoport Caplan (August 10, 1923 — January 18, 2020) was an American businesswoman who was the founder of Frieda's Inc., a specialty produce company in Los Alamitos, California. She created the specialty produce industry in the United States and revolutionized the fresh produce industry.

== Early life ==
Caplan was born Frieda Rapoport in downtown Los Angeles on August 10, 1923. Her parents, Solomon and Rose Yanowa Rapoport, were Jewish Russian immigrants. She was raised in Highland Park. Her father worked for a clothing manufacturer as a pattern cutter, and her mother was a homemaker. She attended UCLA, where she earned a bachelor's degree in Economics and Political Science in 1945. Caplan never learned to cook.

== Career ==
Caplan worked in a law office and a nylon factory before the birth of her first child. In 1955 she had her first child and was looking for a job with flexible hours that allowed her to breastfeed. Relatives of her husband managed a produce company, Giumarra Brothers, that sold at the Los Angeles Wholesale Produce Market. They hired her as a bookkeeper, despite her lack of bookkeeping and produce knowledge. When they left for a vacation shortly afterward, they asked her to take charge on the market floor.

In the 1950s, most grocery store produce aisles carried a very limited selection of produce. According to Cynthia Graber and Nicola Twilley of Gastropod, they might include only a single type of apple, lettuce and onion. According to Caplan, there were "sixty items at the most" in a produce department. In 2020, according to Graber and Twilley, there were approximately 130 produce items generally available. The New York Times noted that as late as the mid-1970s, avocados and Belgian endive were considered exotic. On the first day Caplan worked on the market floor, she saw some unsold portobello mushrooms and started trying to sell them. Most of the produce buyers for local groceries were not interested in this exotic version, as most US produce aisles carried only the immature form of the mushroom, known as white button mushrooms. One buyer, however, said he could use them for a Thanksgiving ad. According to the Los Angeles Times, "his order was massive, and they didn't have enough in stock to fill his request." Caplan sought out the mushrooms, and found workers at a local mushroom farm packing them. She offered to help and obtained enough mushrooms to fill the order. According to her daughter, Karen Caplan, she was eventually "credited with launching and promoting the California fresh brown mushroom market."

Caplan was not particularly interested in food or produce, and she did not cook, but she enjoyed interacting with people and promoting. She began to work on the market floor more frequently. She talked with the small growers at the market—mainly small farmers—about what they were growing. Most of them primarily grew what would sell well at the market to grocery buyers, but many of them also sold items that grew particularly well in their area, that they liked, or that were used in their culture's cuisine. They had a hard time selling these items at the produce market. Since most grocery stores were not carrying them, grocery buyers were not buying them. Caplan told the Orange Country Register in 2015, "The other people on the market were only interested in high-volume items. Small farmers had no place to go. Nobody was interested. So I started listening to all these small farmers." When farmers approached buyers with unusual fruits or vegetables, they were told to talk to Caplan.

In the early 1960s, premises next door to Giumarra Brothers became vacant. Encouraged by the market's landlord, Southern Pacific Railroad, Caplan took over the spot. Her father had to co-sign a loan for her to start her business; typically at the time, women in the US were unable to apply for credit themselves. She was then the only woman working the floor of the market, and according to Entrepreneur, the first woman to "launch, own and operate a wholesale business in the male-dominated US produce industry." She opened the business on April 2, 1962, and began by selling "four or five" items and became "the go-to distributor for anyone offering something unusual."

=== Kiwifruit ===
In 1962, her first year doing business as Frieda's Specialty Produce, she began promoting kiwifruit, then known by the "offputting name" of Chinese gooseberry. An importer approached her and the other produce wholesalers in the market about selling it; Caplan was the only one to say yes. The fruit was unattractive and sold very slowly. Growers in New Zealand began to call the fruit "kiwifruit" in 1959, and Caplan started selling it by that name. She recruited local chefs to create dishes with the fruit and gave out samples on the market floor. She sold the idea of carrying the fruit to the president of the Alpha Beta grocery chain by serving him and his produce supervisors a lunch featuring several courses of kiwifruit dishes. At the time, marketing fruit was a revolutionary idea. The kiwifruit was the first totally new fruit since the banana to be introduced in the US for 90 years. Caplan sold 2,400 pounds (1,100 kg) of kiwifruit in 1962. Kiwifruit became a news story, and by 1986 it was carried in 84% of the nation's supermarkets. Because Caplan was so closely associated with its popularity, food editors started referring to her as "the Queen of Kiwi". The kiwi established her reputation, and growers and importers from outside the market starting contacting her. In 1985 The New York Times called the marketing and promotion of the kiwifruit "her greatest claim to fame".

By the 1970s, Caplan had a sales team who were all women. She had a regular spot on local television giving "market reports to consumers". By 1979 she was selling 130 specialty produce items.

=== Packaging and promoting ===
Caplan was known for her inventiveness at packaging and promoting unusual produce and being willing to take risks with profits. The Los Angeles Times said she revolutionized the industry. In 2020, The New York Times credited her with coming up with the idea of packaging and labeling produce with use information and advice on storing and labeling. After selling an order containing both root ginger and Jerusalem artichokes, which Mimi Sheraton credited Caplan for branding "sunchokes", she received a complaint that customers, produce department managers, and grocery cashiers could not tell them apart, and that the sunchokes' shelf life was too short. She started packaging the sunchokes in 1-pound (0.45 kg) plastic bags to identify them and to improve shelf life, with a recipe attached, an approach which was unheard of at the time. According to Karen Caplan, "six times as many sunchokes were sold because my mom put them in a package". According to Graber and Twilley, "this was the first real label" and the first packaged produce. According to Caplan, it "stunned the industry", because except for Sunkist's stamping the word "Sunkist" on oranges, there had "never been any labelling or packaging" in the fresh produce industry. They started packing other produce with labels that identified the item, explained where it was from and how to tell if it was ripe, and gave contact details for Frieda's Specialty Produce. They were "flooded" with hundreds of letters each week, many of which asked how to use the product, and decided to start adding recipes to the labels, many of which were developed by Karen Caplan, who was by this time working full time for her mother.

In the mid-1970s Frieda's introduced sugar snap peas, but grocery buyers did not understand the product which is an edible-pod sweet pea. They contacted the food writer for The Baltimore Sun, who wrote a story about the "totally edible sweet pea" and put it on the front page of the food section. In 1979 she told Mimi Sheraton it was not the consumer but "the retailer who is afraid to try anything new. When we pioneer a new item, we are willing to take a small markup to get it introduced. Then when it catches on we realize a better profit."

At one point Caplan, worried about whether it was possible to run out of new products to introduce and contacted a horticultural expert, who told her there were between 20,000 and 80,000 edible species and that only around 200 had ever been commercially developed. Caplan retired in 1990 but as of 2012 still worked full time as chairman of the board. In 1995 she appeared on the David Letterman Show. A 2015 documentary about her career, Fear No Fruit, was produced by Cinetic.

== Legacy and recognition ==
According to The New York Times, Caplan "[broadened] the choices available to American consumers by importing products from South America, Australia, Asia and elsewhere. She taught retailers how to store and promote them and buyers how to prepare them." In 2015, Entrepreneur said that Caplan "forever changed the American produce landscape, and our palates by extension, by ushering edible oddities out of obscurity and into the mainstream." In 2020, The New York Times credited her with the idea of packaging and labeling produce. The Washington Post said she whetted "the American appetite for dozens of once-rare fruits and vegetables that today are commonplace in groceries, kitchens and restaurants." The Los Angeles Times noted that she "broke the glass ceiling in the testosterone-doused produce world and forever changed the way Americans eat fruits and vegetables" and credited her with creating the specialty produce industry in the US, saying that she "almost singlehandedly created fruit and vegetable trends". University of California Cooperative Extension advisor Ben Faber, who works with specialty crops, said, "She changed our eating habits." In 1990 the Los Angeles Times named her, along with Steve Jobs and Jane Fonda, among a dozen Californians who "shaped American businesses in the 1980s." The Wall Street Journal said she "spawned today’s culinary daredevils".

Caplan was named an Outstanding California Woman in Business in 1987. UCLA gave her a Professional Achievement Award. She was the first woman awarded a Produce Man of the Year award from The Packer, the newspaper of the fresh produce industry, and refused to accept it until it was renamed to Produce Marketer of the Year. Cal Poly-San Luis Obispo awarded her an honorary Doctor of Humane Letters. United Fresh Produce Association gave her a Lifetime Achievement Award. The National Association of Women Business Owners gave her a Legacy Award, Working Woman magazine gave her their first Harriet Alger Award for Entrepreneurship and the Produce Marketing Association gave her a Women's Catalyst Award in 2019.

== Frieda's Specialty Produce ==
According to The New York Times, an endorsement from Frieda's represents "a game-changer" for growers.

Caplan's daughters, Karen and Jackie, took over the business after her retirement. The business is now called Frieda's Inc. As of 2020, Frieda's was "basically where all the new fruits and vegetables on our supermarket shelves come from", according to Graber and Twilley. The company no longer deals in kiwifruit; it is no longer considered specialty produce. According to Graber and Twilley, Frieda's is "ground zero" for growers of a new-to-the-US produce item. The company buys products from American farmers and from importers.

The company's introductions to supermarket produce departments, in addition to kiwifruit, sugar snap peas and Jerusalem artichokes, include: jicama, blood oranges, guavas, shallots, Belgian endive, red seedless grapes, passion fruit, star fruit, jackfruit, many chili peppers including habaneros, Asian pears, many squashes including spaghetti squash, Meyer lemons, and fresh herbs.

By 2018 Frieda's had 75 full-time employees and 110 part-time. As of January 2020 the company's annual sales are US$60 million.

== Personal life ==
Caplan married Alfred Hale Caplan, a labor relations consultant, in 1951. They had two daughters, Karen and Jackie. Caplan's husband died in 1998. At age 95 she became a vegan. Caplan died January 18, 2020, in Los Alamitos at the age of 96.
