= Osea Island =

Tidal island in the estuary of the River Blackwater, Essex, East England

Coordinates: 51.7225°N 0.7711°E

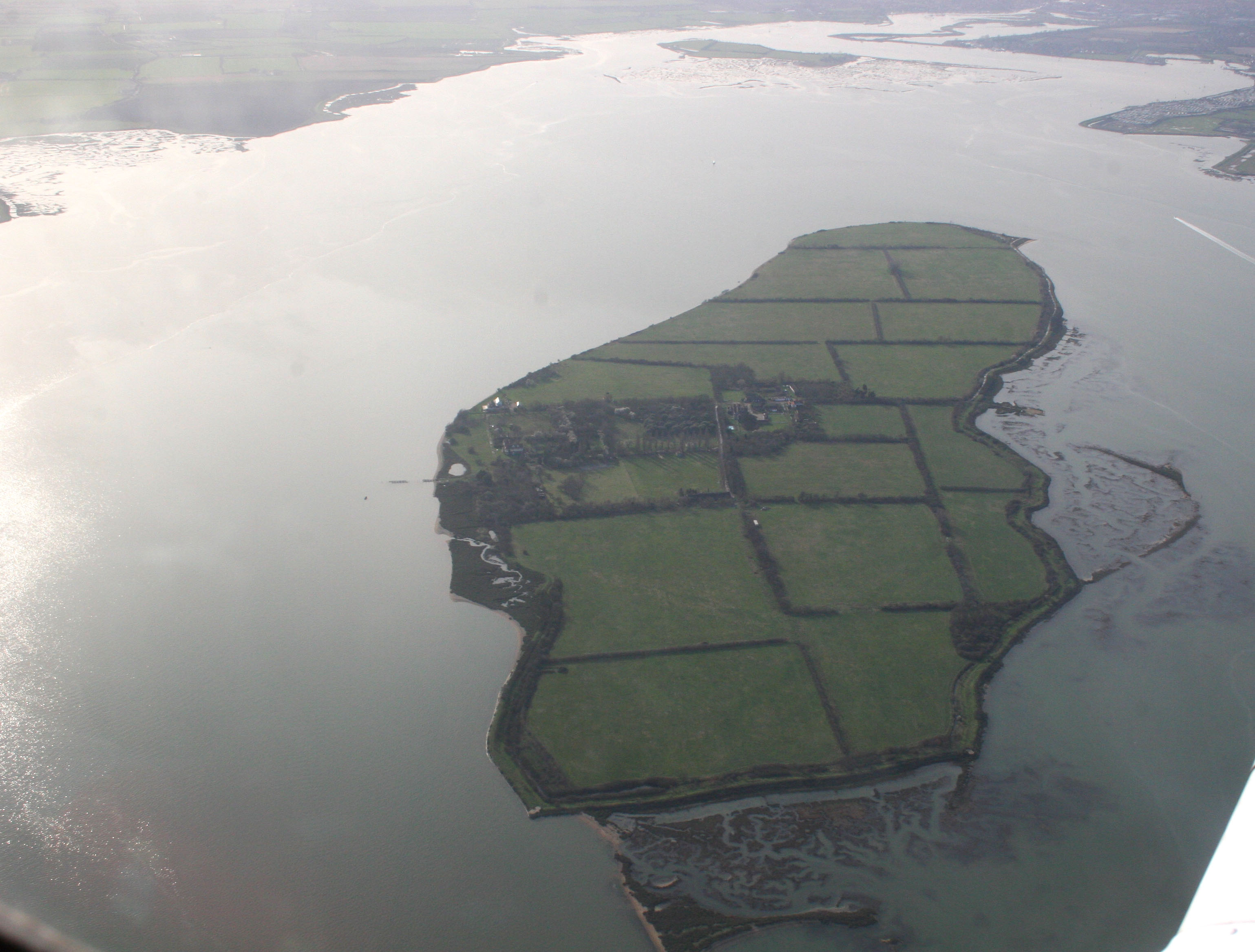

- Location within Essex
- OS grid reference: TL913065
- District: Maldon
- Shire county: Essex
- Region: East
- Country: England
- Sovereign state: United Kingdom
- Post town: Maldon
- Postcode district: CM9
- Dialling code: 01621
- Police: Essex
- Fire: Essex
- Ambulance: East of England

Osea Island (Old English: Ōsgȳþes īeg, "Osyth's island"), formerly also Osey, is an inhabited island in the estuary of the River Blackwater, Essex, East England. It is approximately 380 acres (150 hectares) in size and is connected to the north bank of the river by a causeway that is covered at high water. The island's population is included in the civil parish of Heybridge.

Northey Island lies about one mile (1.5 kilometres) west and Mersea Island is about five miles (eight kilometres) northeast. The entire island is owned by music producer Nigel Frieda.

== Notable residents ==
Before 2004, the island had a small community of tenants such as the painter Luke Elwes, photographer Hélène Binet, and philosopher David Papineau. It was revealed in 2019 that Bajan singer Rihanna rented the island to record an album.

== History ==
The name "Osea" means "Osyth's Island", it has been occupied since the neolithic age and has a strong association with numerous Viking incursions and settlement in England.

Archaeological evidence indicates human occupation of Osea Island dating back over 5,000 years, including Neolithic settlements and Roman pottery works associated with the construction of the tidal causeway.

Following the Anglo-Saxon era, the island was officially recorded as an independent settlement in the Domesday Book of 1086 under the name "Uvesia." At the time of the Norman Conquest, ownership of the manorial estate was held by a local lord named Thorbert, before being granted by William the Conqueror to his nephew.

During the 1500s, the estate was held by Anne Bourchier, Marchioness of Northampton. Royal property records from this period explicitly confirm that the estate was held as the "Manor or Isle of Ovesey, with free fishery, free warren, and wrec of the sea," legally establishing its independent ownership of the surrounding fishing waters and shoreline.

Later in the 16th century, the manor was held by Thomas Wiseman under Knight's service to Queen Elizabeth I, confirming its status as an independent estate before its eventual acquisition by local landowners in the late 18th century.

=== Military use ===
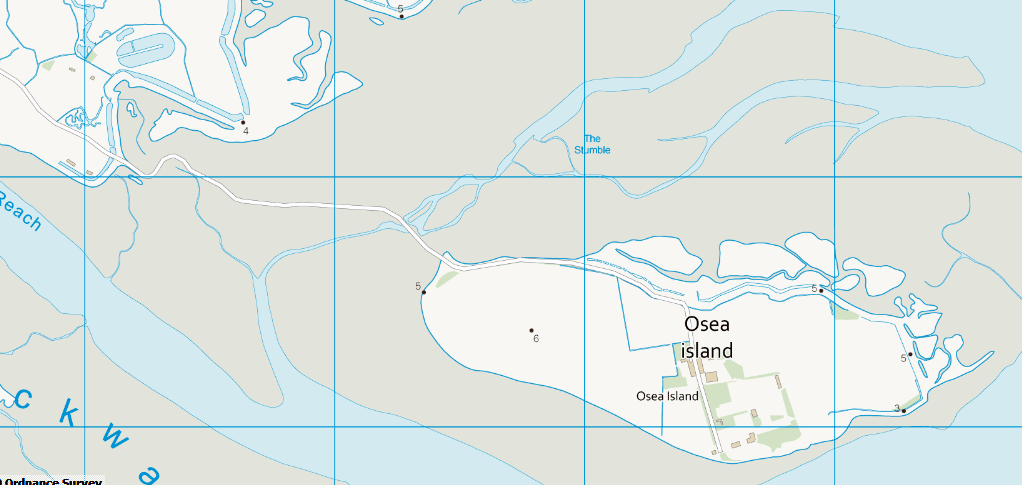
Map of Osea Island, also showing the causeway to the mainland.

In 1913 the British Deperdussin Aeroplane Company tested a newly developed seaplane at Osea. It was a single-engined seaplane with two large floats. It was piloted by John Cyril Porte, the managing director of the company, and took off from the deep water channel to the south of the island. It had a successful ten-minute flight.

Osea Island was the site of a Coastal Motor Torpedo Boat base during the First World War and 2,000 sailors were billeted there, mainly in temporary huts which were removed after the war. Augustus Agar was awarded the Victoria Cross while stationed on the island and detailed his experiences in his book Baltic Episode.

In the Second World War, the island was occupied by the British Army.

=== Filming ===
The 1979 Children's Film Foundation film Black Island, produced by Kingsgate Films and directed by Ben Bolt, was shot on and around the island. The film is about two young castaways who are captured by escaped convicts on the island and their subsequent escape attempts.

Both the 1989 television adaptation of Susan Hill's novel The Woman in Black and the 2012 film adaptation of the same used the island's causeway as the location for the fictional Nine Lives Causeway.

The island was used for auditions on the ITV1 show Superstar, filmed in early 2012, in which it was known as Superstar Island. It was the second episode and included eliminations. Andrew Lloyd Webber was casting for a new lead role, in his production of Jesus Christ Superstar. Melanie C, Dawn French and Jason Donovan were also on the panel.

The island is the setting for the television drama miniseries The Third Day.

=== Treatment ===
Osea Island holds a place in the history of drug and alcohol treatment in Britain. It was formerly owned by a member of the Charrington brewing family, Frederick Nicholas Charrington, who also founded the Tower Hamlets Mission, which continues to house a drug and alcohol treatment centre, Charis. Charrington established a retreat for wealthy alcoholics on Osea Island, among whom it is rumoured that Walter Sickert was included.

From 2005 to 2010, it was a rehabilitation centre specialising in the treatment of addiction problems and mental health called the Causeway Retreat, managed by former nurse Brendan Quinn. In 2008, Amy Winehouse attended the rehab clinic on the island. The Causeway Retreat was refused registration on 30 September 2010 by the Care Quality Commission, and Brendan Quinn was suspended as a nurse by the Nursing and Midwifery Council on 20 September 2010. On 19 November 2010 Brendan Quinn's Twenty 7 Management, which had run the Causeway Retreat, pleaded guilty at Chelmsford Magistrates' Court, and was fined £8,000 plus £30,000 costs for running an unlicensed hospital. District Judge David Cooper said the firm's standards "would really shame a third world country".

=== Music ===
The island is used by musicians as a private retreat to record albums. It has its own fully equipped recording studio as well as ample accommodation.
