= Friða Saiya =

Danish-Faroese singer

- Born: Fríða Vágsheyg Sigurðsson; 2005 or 2006 (age 20–21)
- Genre: Pop
- Years active: 2024–present
- Label: No3

Fríða Vágsheyg Sigurðsson, known professionally as Friða Saiya, is a Danish-Faroese singer.

== Career ==
Saiya began writing songs at the age of 12, with her musical influences being Robyn, Bon Iver, Maggie Rogers, and Hayley Williams. Supported by her family, she attended Sankt Annæ Gymnasium where she took part in their SheCanPlay program.

In 2024, Saiya performed as an opening act for Soleima during her tour and again in 2025, including a sold-out show at Hotel Cecil, where she performed with only two weeks notice. She later performed as a supporting act for Mille in April 2026.

Saiya began to notice interest in her music after she began posting to TikTok, which led to her signing to a music label. On 27 February 2026, Saiya released her debut single, "Søvnløs". The single was noted for its radio time and strong start on music streaming services. "To lanterner" was released on 3 June 2026 by Mathias Ranch, featuring Saiya. The song appeared on Hitlisten's airplay top 20 on 24 June at number 12.

Saiya appeared on DR P3's music program, P3's Næste, in April 2026. The program, previously called KarriereKanonen, is aimed at finding new Danish music artists. On 25 April, she performed live alongside Karla Korsbak at Pumpehuset's Byhaven. As a result of her appearance and performance on the show, she was nominated for an award at the annual P3 Guld awards.

During 2026, Saiya performed at several music festivals in Denmark, including Spot, as well as a headliner at Koncerthuset in November 2026. She released her debut EP, ['fryi:ja 'sai:ja], on 14 August 2026.

== Discography ==
=== Extended plays ===
Title	Details
['fryi:ja 'sai:ja]	Release date: 14 August 2026; Label: No3

=== Singles ===
Title	Year	Album
"Søvnløs"	2026	Non-album singles
"To lanterner" (with Mathias Ranch)	2026	Non-album singles

== Awards and nominations ==
Year	Award	Category	Recipient(s)	Result	Ref.
2026	P3 Guld	P3 Next	Saiya	Won	
