= Frederick Nicholas Charrington =

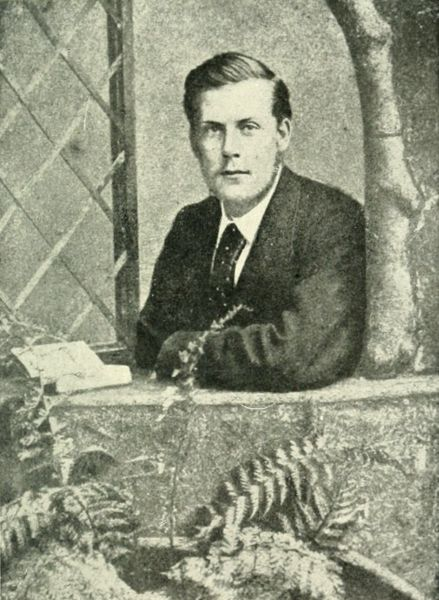
Charrington in about 1870

Frederick Nicholas Charrington (4 February 1850 – 2 January 1936) was an English social reformer who renounced succession to a fortune of over £1 million in order to devote his life to temperance work.

== Life and work ==
Charrington was born in the Bow Road, in the East End of London. His father was a partner in the Charrington Brewery, one of London's biggest brewing companies. Charrington was heir to a fortune of a million and a quarter pounds. He was educated at Marlborough College, but left because of illness and finished his school career at Brighton College. He subsequently joined the family business.

At the age of 19, Charrington had a conversion experience and became an Evangelical Christian. About a year later, while walking through Whitechapel, he saw a poorly dressed woman with her children begging her husband to leave a public house and give her money for food. The furious husband came out and knocked her into the gutter. Charrington went to help and was also knocked to the ground. Looking up, he saw his name on the sign above the pub.

“When I saw that sign,” he later wrote, “I was stricken just as surely as Paul on the Damascus Road. Here was the source of my family wealth, and it was producing untold human misery before my own eyes. Then and there I pledged to God that not another penny of that money should come to me.”

Charrington abandoned the family business to devote his life to helping the poor in the East End. He opened a school, led a fight to clean up the music halls and became an ardent worker for the Temperance Movement. In 1870 he founded the Tower Hamlets Mission and made the Great Assembly Hall in the Mile End Road a centre of Christian work in the East End of London.

In 1903 Charrington purchased Osea Island off the coast of Maldon in Essex and established a treatment centre for people with alcohol and opiate addictions. In return for free treatment, clients would remain on the island and work the land.

He was one of the original members of the London County Council (1889–95).

He died in the London Hospital in January 1936.

== Works by Frederick Nicholas Charrington ==
- Battle of the Music Halls, London: Dyer Bros., 1885?
- The Conference Hymn Book. London: Morgan and Scott, 1874
- An Oasis in the Desert. Frederick. N. Charrington, The Ex-Brewer, and his Work in the East of London. (Reprinted from the Christian Herald.) London: Book Saloon; Morgan & Scott, 1886
- The Quarterly Record of the Tower Hamlets Mission and its Branches. London, 1881–86.
