= John Frieda =

British hairstylist (1951–2026)

- Born: Alan Howard Frieda; 9 July 1951; London, England
- Died: 3 November 2026 (aged 75); London, England
- Occupations: Businessman; hairstylist
- Spouse(s): Lulu (m. 1977; div. 1991) Avery Agnelli
- Children: 3
- Relatives: Nigel Frieda (brother)

John Frieda (born Alan Howard Frieda; 9 July 1951 – 3 November 2026) was a British celebrity hairstylist and founder of hair salon and hair product businesses. The hair product business was acquired in 2002 by Kao Corporation, Japan.

As of March 2025, The Sunday Times estimated his net worth at £150 million.

== Early life ==
Frieda was born in London to Isidore Frieda, a hairdressing salon and property owner, and Hannah Mary Docherty. He had three siblings, including Nigel Frieda.

He was privately educated at King's School, Harrow. While young, Frieda worked part-time at his father's salon. His father wanted him to become a doctor, but Frieda was determined to become a hairdresser, "to get out of studying", he said. At age 16 he went to work for Leonard Lewis, known as Leonard of Mayfair. He changed his name to John because there was another Alan at Leonard's salon.

== Personal life and death ==
From 1977 until 1991, Frieda was married to Scottish pop singer and actress Lulu, and together they had a son. He later married Avery Agnelli, widow of the Fiat heir Giovanni Alberto Agnelli, with whom he had two children and a stepdaughter.

Frieda died from cancer at a hospital in London on 3 November 2026, aged 75.
