= List of storms named Freda =

The name Freda was used for seventeen tropical cyclones worldwide: twelve in the Western Pacific Ocean, four in the South Pacific Ocean, and one in the South-West Indian Ocean.

In the Western Pacific:

- Tropical Storm Freda (1952) (T5204) – a short-lived tropical storm which impacted Kyushu.
- Typhoon Freda (1956) (T5613) – a typhoon which hit Taiwan and China before affecting Japan and Alaska as a post-tropical system.
- Typhoon Freda (1959) (T5921, 48W) – a strong, late-season typhoon that struck the Philippines, killing 58.
- Typhoon Freda (1962) (T6223, 72W) – a typhoon which formed and remained in the open ocean but later struck the west coast of Canada and the Pacific Northwest coast of the United States as a potent extratropical cyclone, and became known as the Columbus Day Storm of 1962.
- Typhoon Freda (1965) (T6511, 14W, Miling) – a strong typhoon that made landfall on northern Luzon and on Hainan island.
- Typhoon Freda (1967) (T6736, 32W, Yayang) – a late-season typhoon which made landfall in the Philippines and in South Vietnam.
- Typhoon Freda (1971) (T7110, 10W, Luding) – a moderate typhoon which hit northern Philippines and southern China.
- Tropical Storm Freda (1974) (T7407, 07W) – a tropical storm that remained at sea.
- Severe Tropical Storm Freda (1977) (T7713, 14W, Pining) – a strong but short-lived tropical storm which struck Hong Kong.
- Typhoon Freda (1981) (T8101, 01W) – a strong early-season typhoon that remained in the open ocean.
- Severe Tropical Storm Freda (1984) (T8408, 08W, Ditang) – a relatively strong tropical storm which struck northern Taiwan and eastern China.
- Typhoon Freda (1987) (T8713, 13W) – a violent typhoon that stayed at sea.

In the South Pacific:

- Cyclone Freda (1981) – a powerful tropical cyclone which made landfall in New Caledonia.
- Cyclone Freda (1985) – a strong tropical cyclone that stayed at sea.
- Cyclone Freda (1997) – an erratic tropical cyclone which eventually affected no land areas.
- Cyclone Freda (2012) – a strong tropical cyclone that affected New Caledonia and the Solomon Islands.

In the South-West Indian:

- Cyclone Freda (1965) – a tropical cyclone which brought strong winds to Rodrigues and Mauritius.

== See also ==
- Hurricane Frieda, a similar name used twice in the Atlantic Ocean.
