= Group (online social networking) =

Online social networking

A group (often termed as a community, e-group or club) is a feature in many social networking services which allows users to create, post, comment to and read from their own interest- and niche-specific forums, often within the realm of virtual communities. Groups, which may allow for open or closed access, invitation and/or joining by other users outside the group, are formed to provide mini-networks within the larger, more diverse social network service. Much like electronic mailing lists, they are also owned and maintained by owners, moderators, or managers, who can edit posts to discussion threads and regulate member behavior within the group. However, unlike traditional Internet forums and mailing lists, groups in social networking services allow owners and moderators alike to share account credentials between groups without having to log in to every group.

== History ==
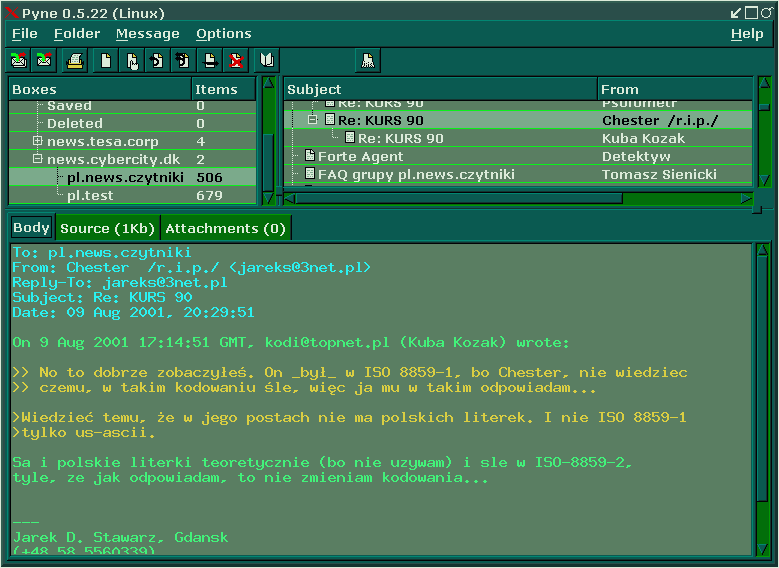
Posts in a Usenet newsgroup

The rise of the World Wide Web resulted in an expansion of the varieties of methods for communication on the Internet, much of which was limited in the 1980s to discussion in newsgroups, BBS and chat rooms. While the initial rise of web-based mass communication took place in the form of early Internet forums in the mid-1990s, a few services such as MSN Groups, Yahoo! Groups and eGroups pioneered the combination of web-based mailing list archives with user profiles; by 2000, such services doubled as full-fledged mailing lists and Internet forums, allowing users to create an extremely large variety of discussion and networking mediums with comparatively sparse thresholds of complexity. Further features included chat rooms (often Java-based), image and video galleries, and group calendars.

The second spurt of bullecalbel networking, one which was less dependent upon mailing list-related features and more upon Internet forum features, began in the early- to mid-2000s in the form of such services as LiveJournal, Friendster, MySpace and Facebook. These services continued the evolution of the web-based e-group as a discussion and organization medium. In the late 2000s, services such as Yammer and Micromobs further advanced e-group communication by taking advantage of microblog-style activity streams.

== In virtual worlds ==
In Second Life, groups are centered less around discussion forums (as such, an asynchronous conferencing feature is not built into the Second Life network as of 2009) and common interest, and are more centered on maintenance of a particular geographic location inside the network. Such groups are often created by the owners of areas such as buildings, plots of land or whole islands in order to cater to the most frequent visitors and patrons of the regions. With the limited asynchronous messaging capability of Second Life, groups are also a means of mass-emailing announcements pertinent to the group, but are not completely capable of hosting discussion or deliberation of such announcement messages.

== The importance of online social networking groups ==
Before people expanded their social life to the internet, they had small circles. These included the networks gained from rural areas or villages, such as family, friends and neighbors, and community groups such as churches. These networks represented a social safety net to support individuals.

Since we have moved a huge part of our social life to the internet, online social networking groups have become a way to maintain a structure in social life. Online networking is made up by clusters of people, bounding themselves together on the World Wide Web. To be able to sort out the many different clusters we belong to we use online groups to helps us arrange and make sense of all our contacts. This sense-making is rooted within us, we sort and put people into compartments or sort by categories to make sense and try to understand our relationships to the people around us. Online social networking groups therefore enables us to do the same thing online. Online social networks have a huge impact on people’s lives. Since the social network revolution has offered people with more loose ties and diversity in their relationships, it creates both stress and opportunities. Furthermore, the Internet revolution has transformed the contact point from a household to the individual. In addition, people are in constant communication with each other due to the mobile revolution. All in all, the mentioned revolutions created a new social operating system: "networked individualism". The way that people currently connect, communicate and exchange information can be described as a form of operating system because of the similarities between the structure of computer systems and the networked individualism that has taken form in society. These structures consist of unwritten rules, norms, constraints and opportunities which are apparent for those who are part of a specific network.

== Concerns ==
There is some research claiming that fake news is infiltrating online social networking. A recent study claimed that people exposed to fake news generally revert to their original opinion even after finding out the information they were given was false.

== See also ==
- Internet forum
