= Frieda Keller =

Swiss woman who killed her own out-of-wedlock child

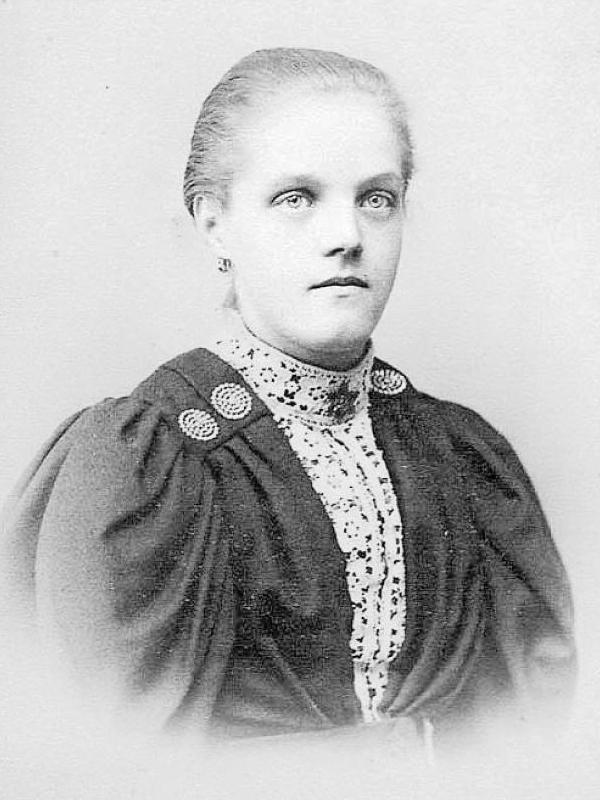
- Frieda Keller in 1903.
- Born: December 24, 1879; Bischofszell
- Died: September 7, 1942 (aged 62); Münsterlingen
- Occupations: Seamstress, waitress
- Known for: Murder of her own child, born out of wedlock following rape by her employer.

Frieda Keller (December 24, 1879 – September 7, 1942), was a Swiss seamstress convicted of the murder of her child born of rape.

She was sentenced to death by the St. Gallen Cantonal Court on November 12, 1904, for the murder of her son Ernst. Pardoned on November 18, 1904, by the St. Gallen Cantonal Council, her death sentence was commuted to life imprisonment in solitary confinement. She was released on November 25, 1919, after fifteen years in harsh conditions.

Her case led to the revision of the Swiss Criminal Code's provisions on homicide, to take account of the perpetrator's motive.

== Life ==
=== Origins ===
Frieda Keller was born on December 24, 1879, in Bischofszell, Canton Thurgau. She was the fifth of eleven children, two of whom died prematurely. Her father, Jakob, was a shoemaker; her mother was born Anna Kobi in Rapperswil.

She was a seamstress and also worked as a waitress at an inn on weekends.

=== Rape and child out of wedlock ===
One day, at the age of 18, Keller's boss, Karl Zimmerli, married with two children and a close friend of her father, sent her to the cellar to fetch some wine, and took advantage of the opportunity to rape her. A second rape took place later, in the innkeeper's bedroom, as Keller brought in a dress for his wife. Zimmerli also raped her older sister, who had worked for him before refusing to return.

Pregnant, Keller sought anonymity in nearby St. Gallen and managed to hide her pregnancy for many months. Her father disowned her when he finally learned of the pregnancy. She gave birth to her child, Ernst, in the cantonal maternity hospital on May 27, 1899, and placed him in a nursery run by Catholic nuns. Keller struggled to find the money to pay childcare costs. Zimmerli had only sent her money once and Keller's father had died in 1901, leaving an inheritance that was squandered by one of her brothers.

When Ernst was four years old, the nursery asked Keller to take him back, as there was no room left for him. The young woman was dating a letter carrier, Beat Rothenfluh, whom she hoped to marry, and she had not yet told him about the child. Keller sought advice from her mother, who confessed that she herself had given birth to a child out of wedlock, conceived with her late husband, and that, abandoned, she had strangled the newborn in despair, for which she had been sentenced to six years' imprisonment. The mother died of a stroke three weeks after this confession. On Christmas Day, Keller told Rothenfluh about Ernst, but he rejected her. Keller removed her child from the nursery on May 2, 1904, telling the nuns that she wanted to take him to an aunt in Munich. On June 1, 1904, she wrote that the trip had gone smoothly and the child had acclimatized well.

=== Murder, trial and pardon ===
Ernst's body was found by a pair of hikers on June 7, 1904, in a wood near Tablat, close to St. Gallen, Switzerland at around 6:10 p.m., covered in foliage and mud, with a string around his neck. A violent thunderstorm earlier in the day is believed to have uncovered the body. The coroner estimated that the child had been dead for at least six to eight weeks.

After the public prosecutor's office placed an advertisement in the local press on June 13, describing the clothes the child was wearing, two nursery sisters came forward to identify the child. Arrested the next day, Keller immediately confessed to the murder. When questioned, she stated that she was desperate and had no other option: she was ashamed that more people would know that she had had a child born out of wedlock, and she feared that she would not be able to support herself.

Her trial opened on November 11, 1904, at the St. Gallen Cantonal Court. The defense lawyer emphasized the circumstances that had driven Frieda Keller to the brink of despair. However, the law did not allow circumstances to be taken into account, so the death sentence was pronounced by the court the following day. The verdict was shocking to the public, and feminist associations mobilized. Writer Carl Albert Loosli and psychiatrist Auguste Forel also lent their support to Frieda Keller, the latter even writing that the real culprit was Zimmerli, who was not legally accountable for his obligations or actions. The media also exerted pressure, even though the Catholic newspaper Die Ostschweiz described Keller as a cold-blooded murderer who led an indecent life with numerous lovers.

On November 28, 1904, the Cantonal Council of St. Gallen pardoned Keller by 156 votes to 1, commuting her sentence to life imprisonment in solitary confinement with an obligation to remain silent. Keller's sisters obtained another pardon from the cantonal parliament for early release fifteen years later, after an initial refusal at the end of 1914. Frieda Keller was released from prison on November 25, 1919, but was shattered by the harshness of her imprisonment: she suffered from depression and delirium.

== Changes to the Swiss Criminal Code ==
It was in the wake of this case that the Swiss Criminal Code was amended to distinguish between homicide and murder, the former being limited to intentional homicide, while the latter implies "a particular lack of scruples, especially if the motive, aim, or way of acting is particularly odious."
