= Frida E. Polli =

Italian-British-American neuroscientist

Frida E. Polli is an Italian-British-American neuroscientist. She is currently Visiting Innovation Scholar at the Schwarzman College of Computing at the Massachusetts Institute of Technology (MIT). Previously, she was the co-founder and CEO of pymetrics, a company that develops behavioral assessment tools for hiring, and a cognitive neuroscientist at Massachusetts General Hospital and MIT.

== Education ==
Polli received her B.A from Dartmouth College with Honors in 1994, and completed pre-medical postbaccalaureate training at Dartmouth and Havard from 1994-1996. She earned a Ph.D. from Suffolk University in 2007, and an MBA from Harvard Business School in 2012.

== Career ==
Polli began her academic career as a predoctoral research fellow at Massachusetts General Hospital's Psychiatric Neuroimaging Group / Martinos Biomedical Imaging Center. She was then a postdoctoral fellow in the Department of Brain and Cognitive Sciences at the Massachusetts Institute of Technology (MIT).

In 2013, Polli launched pymetrics, a company that applied artificial intelligence and behavioral science to workforce decision-making, with a former MIT colleague. As a 38-year-old single mother, she stated she did not fit the typical profile of a technology startup founder. She said the company allowed her to "put her scientific and academic knowledge to work to build a business solving real world problems". The company had the stated aim of modernizing hiring with neuroscience-based assessments and machine learning, with Polli arguing that algorithmic systems can reduce bias in hiring if properly designed and audited by emphasizing a philosophy of evaluating potential over pedigree. It was included in several industry lists including CNBC Upstart 100 (2018), the World Economic Forum Technology Pioneers (2018), Forbes AI 50 (2019), and Inc 5000 Fastest Growing Startup (2019). The company was acquired by Harver in 2022, after which she became its chief data science officer.

In 2021, Polli lobbied for New York City legislation requiring audits of automated employment software for bias. From 2020 to 2022, Polli was part of an industry group aimed at lessening the disruptive impact of COVID on the workforce through technology. In 2023, Polli founded Alethia AI, a company focused on ethical AI application. In 2024, Polli became Visiting Innovation Scholar at the Schwarzmann College of Computing at Massachusetts Institute of Technology (MIT). In 2025, she founded the Female Medicine Through Machine Learning initiative at MIT focused on women's health research using large datasets and AI.

== Awards and honours ==
In 2010, she won a Young Investigator Award from the Brain and Behavior Research Foundation. In 2011, she was finalist in the MIT 100K Entrepreneur Competition. In 2012, Polli received a Robert S. Kaplan Life Sciences Fellowship from Harvard Business School. Polli was named as one of Inc.'s Female Founders 100 in 2019, and Entrepreneur's Top 100 Powerful Women in 2020. In 2021, she was in Fast Company's World Changing Ideas.

== Personal life ==
Polli's family is from Milan and she grew up summering on Lake Como. As of 2024, she lives in New York City with her three daughters.
