= Frieda's Inc. =

American Company

- Company type: Privately owned
- Industry: Foods
- Founded: 1962
- Headquarters: Los Alamitos, California, United States of America
- Key people: Frieda Caplan, Karen Caplan, Jackie Caplan Wiggins
- Products: Fruit, vegetables, gourmet items
- Website: Official website

Frieda’s Inc. is a privately owned company, based in Los Alamitos, California, which markets and distributes specialty produce.

It was founded in 1962 by Frieda Rapoport Caplan. It was the first wholesale produce company in the United States to be founded, owned, and operated by a woman. Caplan died on January 18, 2020, at the age of 96.

Frieda's Inc. is credited with introducing many produce items to the U.S. including the kiwifruit, alfalfa sprouts, spaghetti squash, jicama, shallots, mangos, Donut® peaches, and various Asian and Latin specialties.

== History ==
In 1956, Frieda Caplan first worked as a bookkeeper at Giumarra Bros. Fruit Co. Later on, she began selling Brown Mushrooms, which were a specialty item in those days.

After the success of selling mushrooms, Caplan opened her own company in 1962 with mushrooms as the primary item. She started with a small stand at the Los Angeles wholesale produce market.

Once titled the “Queen of Kiwi,” Caplan gained international recognition from bringing the Kiwifruit to the United States. This fruit was discovered in New Zealand and originally known as "Chinese gooseberries". Although some in the U.S.A. believe Caplan renamed this fruit after the country's flightless bird, the Kiwi, the name was actually proposed by New Zealander Jack Turner in June 1959 at a management meeting of Turners and Growers in Auckland, New Zealand. She convinced California growers to plant the fruit and soon California had more than 700 Kiwifruit growers. She played a key role in popularizing Kiwifruit in the United States by convincing supermarket produce managers to carry the odd-looking fruit.

Caplan's elder daughter, Karen Caplan, was promoted to President and CEO in 1986. That same year the company had annual sales of $US13 million. Jackie Caplan Wiggins, Frieda's younger daughter, serves as Vice President and Business Chief Operating Officer. In 1990, Karen Caplan and Jackie Caplan Wiggins became owners of Frieda's, Inc. In that same year, the name of the company changed from Frieda’s Finest/Produce Specialties Inc. to Frieda’s Inc. As of 2019 one of Karen Caplan's daughters, Alex Jackson, joined the firm as a sales manager.

In 2015, the film Fear No Fruit was released. The film chronicles Caplan's influence on American cuisine.

== Products ==
Frieda's Inc. distributes more than 600 exotic produce and specialty gourmet items to grocery stores and foodservice distributors. Hundreds of the products are labeled with detailed descriptions, usage and handling tips, and offers for free recipes via mail or email. Frieda's, Inc. has a 100% customer satisfaction guarantee.

For every consumer complaint, the company will issue a full refund, plus postage to any customer who is dissatisfied with Frieda's products.
