= January 3–4, 2022 nor'easter =

Weather event in the United States

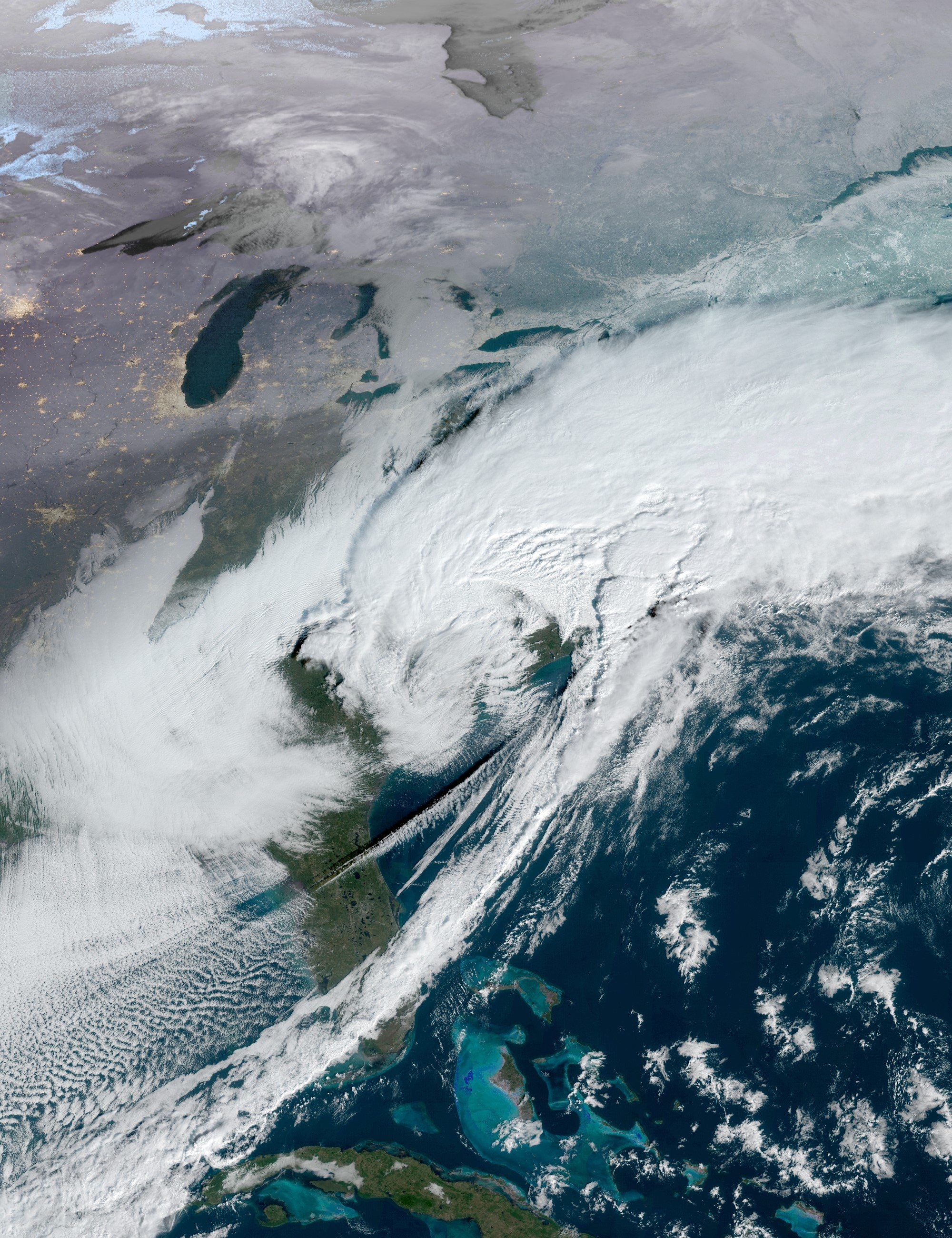
- The storm over North Carolina on January 4

Meteorological history
- Formed: January 3, 2022
- Dissipated: January 4, 2022

Category 1 "Notable" winter storm
- Regional snowfall index: 2.33 (NOAA)
- Lowest pressure: 992 mbar (hPa); 29.29 inHg
- Max. snowfall: 15.5 in (39 cm) in Huntingtown, Maryland, U.S.

Tornado outbreak
- Tornadoes: 2
- Max. rating: EF1 tornado

Overall effects
- Fatalities: 5
- Damage: $495 million (2022 USD)
- Areas affected: Southeastern United States, Mid-Atlantic states
- Power outages: ~850,000
- Part of the 2021–22 North American winter

A nor'easter exited the East Coast of the United States on January 4, producing snowfall from Alabama to New England. The winter storm was unofficially named Winter Storm Frida by The Weather Channel.

== Preparations ==
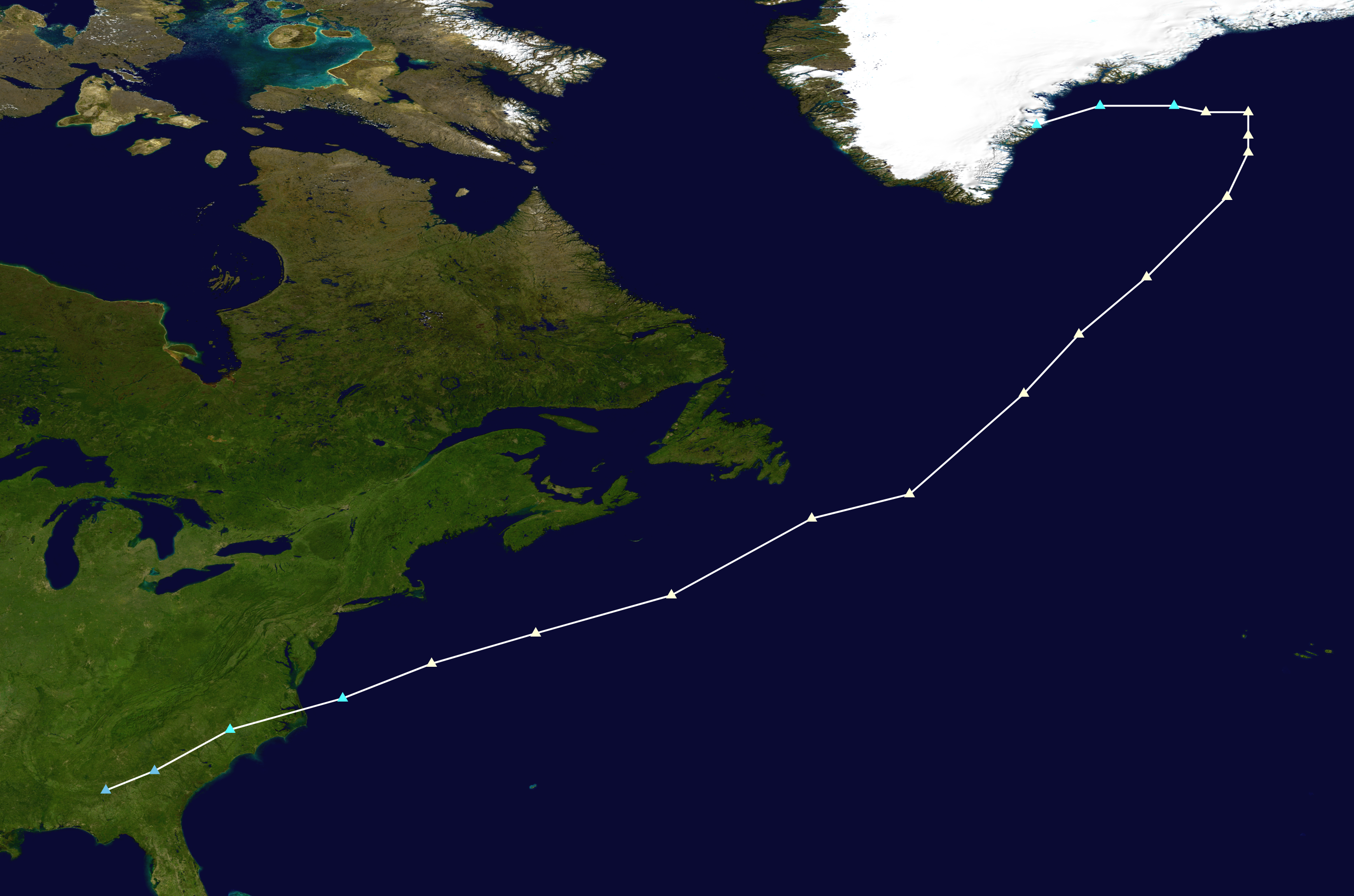
Map plotting the storm's track and intensity, according to the Saffir–Simpson scale Map key Saffir–Simpson scale Tropical depression (≤38 mph, ≤62 km/h) Tropical storm (39–73 mph, 63–118 km/h) Category 1 (74–95 mph, 119–153 km/h) Category 2 (96–110 mph, 154–177 km/h) Category 3 (111–129 mph, 178–208 km/h) Category 4 (130–156 mph, 209–251 km/h) Category 5 (≥157 mph, ≥252 km/h) Unknown Storm type Tropical cyclone Subtropical cyclone Extratropical cyclone, remnant low, tropical disturbance, or monsoon depression

In preparation of the winter storm, Washington D.C. declared a state of emergency and shut down the National Zoo. The governor of New Jersey, Phil Murphy also declared a state of emergency for 5 counties in the southern portion of the state. New York City also issued a travel advisory due to a forecast of light snow.

== Impact ==
Damage from the storm reached $495 million.

=== Southeastern United States ===
As much as 6.0 inches (15 cm) accumulated in Huntsville, Alabama, and 6.9 inches (18 cm) fell at Ronald Reagan Washington National Airport. A peak snowfall accumulation of 15.5 in (39 cm) was recorded in Huntingtown, Maryland. Many vehicles and motorists across Interstate 95 in Virginia were stranded due to the snow, with some of them for 24 hours. Over 1,000 motor crashes were also reported and assisted by the state's police. A car crash also killed three people in Maryland. Two others died in the winter storm, one each in Tennessee and Georgia, bringing the total up to 5. Thousands of flights were canceled in the eastern United States. At the Baltimore Washington International Airport, a ground stop was temporarily instituted. An Amtrak train also got stuck in Lynchburg, Virginia due to the storm. This storm came after a day of record high temperatures; the temperature in Huntsville, Alabama the day before the storm (January 1) was 79 °F (26 °C), a record for January. Snow even fell as far south as Fort Walton Beach, Florida, where temperatures dropped from 75 °F (24 °C) to 34 °F (1 °C). The winter storm also caused 343,000 power outages in Virginia and 42,000 in Maryland.

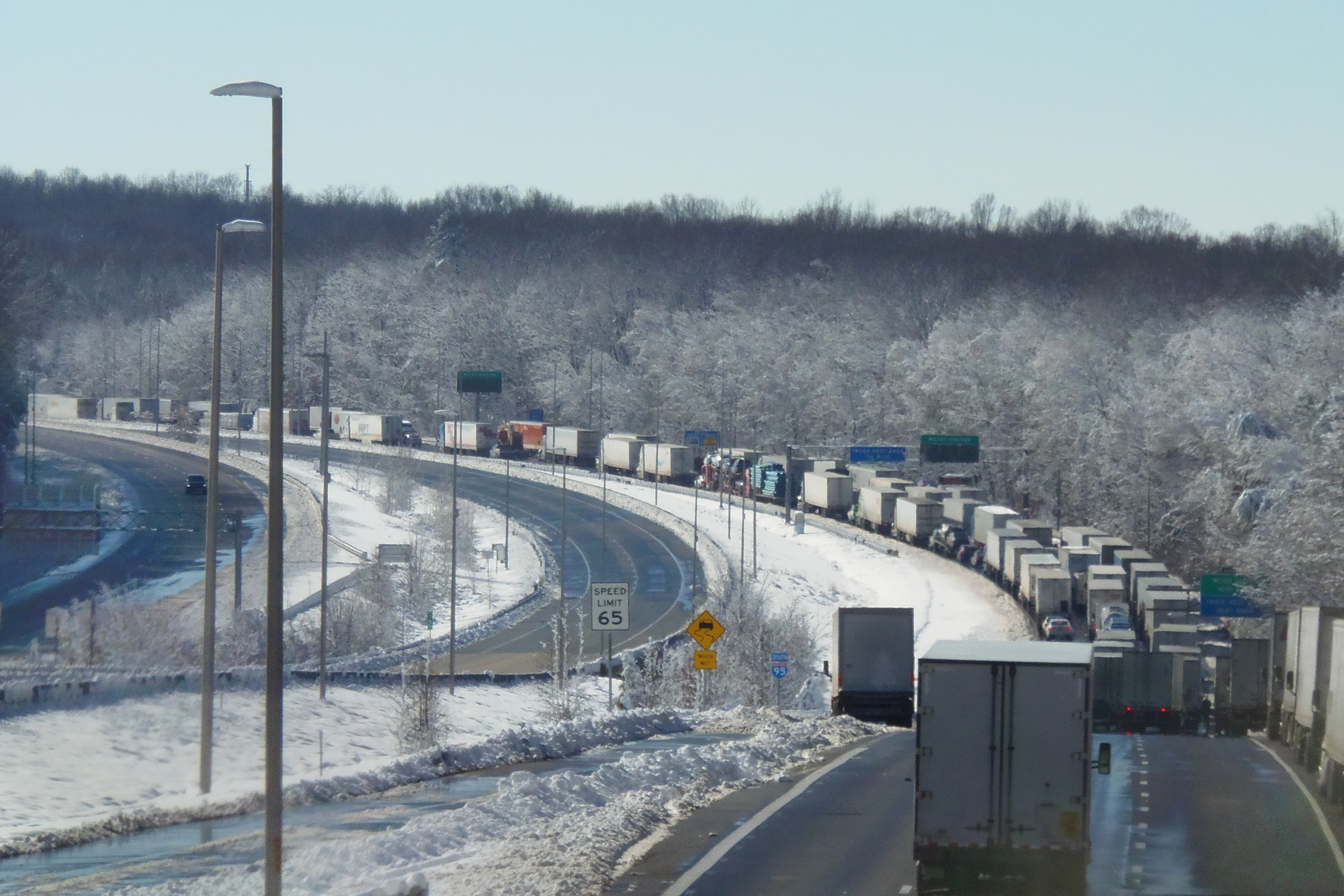
Commuters and truckers along I-95 in Virginia still stranded the day after the January 3 storm brought traffic to a complete halt

North-central, northeast and northwest portions of Georgia were placed under winter storm warnings by the National Weather Service on 1 January. Mccaysville registered an unofficial snow accumulation of 4.5 inches (11 cm), followed by Blue Ridge at 4.0 inches (10 cm). Some of the areas of the state also saw power outages. Winter alerts were also placed over some areas of the state. Over 59,000 household customers lost electricity across Charlotte, with 159,000 overall over the Carolinas. Some establishments were completely wrecked by the strong winds the storm brought, and trees were reported to have been downed. This further rose to 211,000 by 3 January and lessened to 2,500 as rescue teams started working to restore electricity. Flooding also occurred in Durham, North Carolina due to 3 inches (76 mm) of rain. Rainfall totals reached up to 4 inches (100 mm) in Raleigh, and two tornadoes touched down throughout the state.

=== Mid-Atlantic States ===
In Ellendale, Delaware, 14.5 inches (37 cm) of snow fell on 3 January. This led to a chicken house collapse on 4 January which trapped and injured a 12-year-old girl. Due to hazardous conditions, speed limits on parts of the Garden State Parkway and New Jersey Turnpike were reduced to 45 mph (72 km/h), while the speed limit was reduced to 35 miles per hour (56 km/h) on the Delaware Memorial Bridge. Parts of U.S. Route 40 in Egg Harbor Township, New Jersey shut down due to flooding. Additionally, the Atlantic City International Airport was closed for 7 hours. At the airport, 13.0 inches (33 cm) of snow was recorded just 24 hours after the temperature was 62 °F (17 °C). Unusually, the nor'easter struck with very little warning and produced little to no snow north of Philadelphia and Toms River, New Jersey. The city of Philadelphia itself received only 1 inch (2.5 cm) of snow, much less than locations further south. The result of the cutoff also resulted in South Jersey being the snowiest region of New Jersey for the 2021-22 winter, which was only the third time in history that occurrence happened.

=== Iceland ===
Farther north, in Iceland, news about the storm were dispatched across the country's people as a preparation. The south and western parts of Iceland were also placed under an orange warning by the Icelandic Meteorological Office by 5 January. The Icelandic Coast Guard also alerted vessels and fishermen in ports regarding the brunt of it. Icelandair also canceled some flight operations by that day owing to the storm. In the southwest portion of the country, rescue teams were reported to have been responding to the calls by the citizens there regarding the impact of the storm. Across Reykjavík, they responded to flying roofs of different houses and establishments. Suðurnes (Southern Peninsula) and Vestmannaeyjar (Westman Islands) were also severely affected. A hut was also blown away by strong winds in Vatnsleysuströnd.

== Aftermath ==
In the aftermath of the storm, the Virginia Department of Transportation launched an investigation into the shutdown on I-95. However, the 41-page report on the incident failed to blame someone. However, the report did state that then-governor Ralph Northam declined to use the Virginia National Guard to help, which his successor Glenn Youngkin criticized him for. In Delaware, campsites at Redden State Forest was closed following the storm.
