= Leonie Frieda =

British model, translator, writer

Leonie Frieda (born 1956) is a translator, writer and former model, working and living in the United Kingdom.

== Biography ==
Frieda is the daughter of Swedish aristocrats.

Educated in the UK, France and Germany, Frieda speaks five languages. Her first book was a biography of Catherine de' Medici. Published in 2003, it became a bestseller. Frieda has also made documentaries for TV.

She lives in London with her two children by her former husband, music producer Nigel Frieda.

== Works ==
- Catherine de Medici (Weidenfeld & Nicolson, 2003)
- The Deadly Sisterhood: A Story of Women, Power, and Intrigue in the Italian Renaissance (Weidenfeld & Nicolson, 2012)
- Francis I: The Maker of Modern France (Weidenfeld & Nicolson, 2018)
