= List of storms named Frieda =

The name Frieda has been used for two tropical cyclones in the Atlantic Ocean.

- Hurricane Frieda (1957) – a minimal hurricane that remained in the open ocean.
- Tropical Storm Frieda (1977) – a weak and short-lived storm that caused moderate rainfall in Belize.

== See also ==
- List of storms named Freda, a similar name used in the Pacific and Indian oceans
