= Freda (surname) =

Freda is a surname. Notable people with the surname include:

- Anthony Freda, American illustrator
- Elena Freda (1890–1978), Italian mathematician
- Fabrizio Freda (born 1957), Italian businessman
- Franco Freda (born 1941), Italian right-wing intellectual
- Frank Freda, American playwright, actor and businessman
- Krystyna Freda, Association football player
- Taison Barcellos Freda (born 1988), Brazilian footballer
- Riccardo Freda (1909–1999), Italian film director
- William C. Freda, American financier
