= Nigel Frieda =

British record producer (born 1952)

- Born: Nigel Quentin Frieda; August 1952 (age 74)
- Citizenship: British
- Occupations: Record producer, property owner
- Known for: Sugababes; The Rolling Stones
- Spouse(s): Leonie Frieda (divorced 1997) ? (died before 2008)
- Children: 3
- Relatives: John Frieda (brother)

Nigel Quentin Frieda (born August 1952) is a British record producer, and owner of the 380 acres (1.5 km^{2}) Osea Island in the estuary of the River Blackwater, Essex.

== Early life ==
Nigel Quentin Frieda was born in August 1952, the son of Isidore Frieda, a Jewish hairdresser, salon and property owner, and an Irish Catholic mother. His elder brother was the hairdresser John Frieda.

== Career ==
He runs London's Matrix Studio and has also produced the Rolling Stones.

He is the owner of the 380 acres (1.5 km^{2}) Osea Island in the estuary of the River Blackwater, Essex, England, most of which he bought in 2000 for £6 million. He acquired the rest of the island after 2012.

== Personal life ==
Frieda married the future biographer Leonie Frieda, the daughter of Swedish aristocrats, and they have two adult children, Elizabeth and Jake. They divorced in 1997.
