= Brand page =

Online social networking parlance

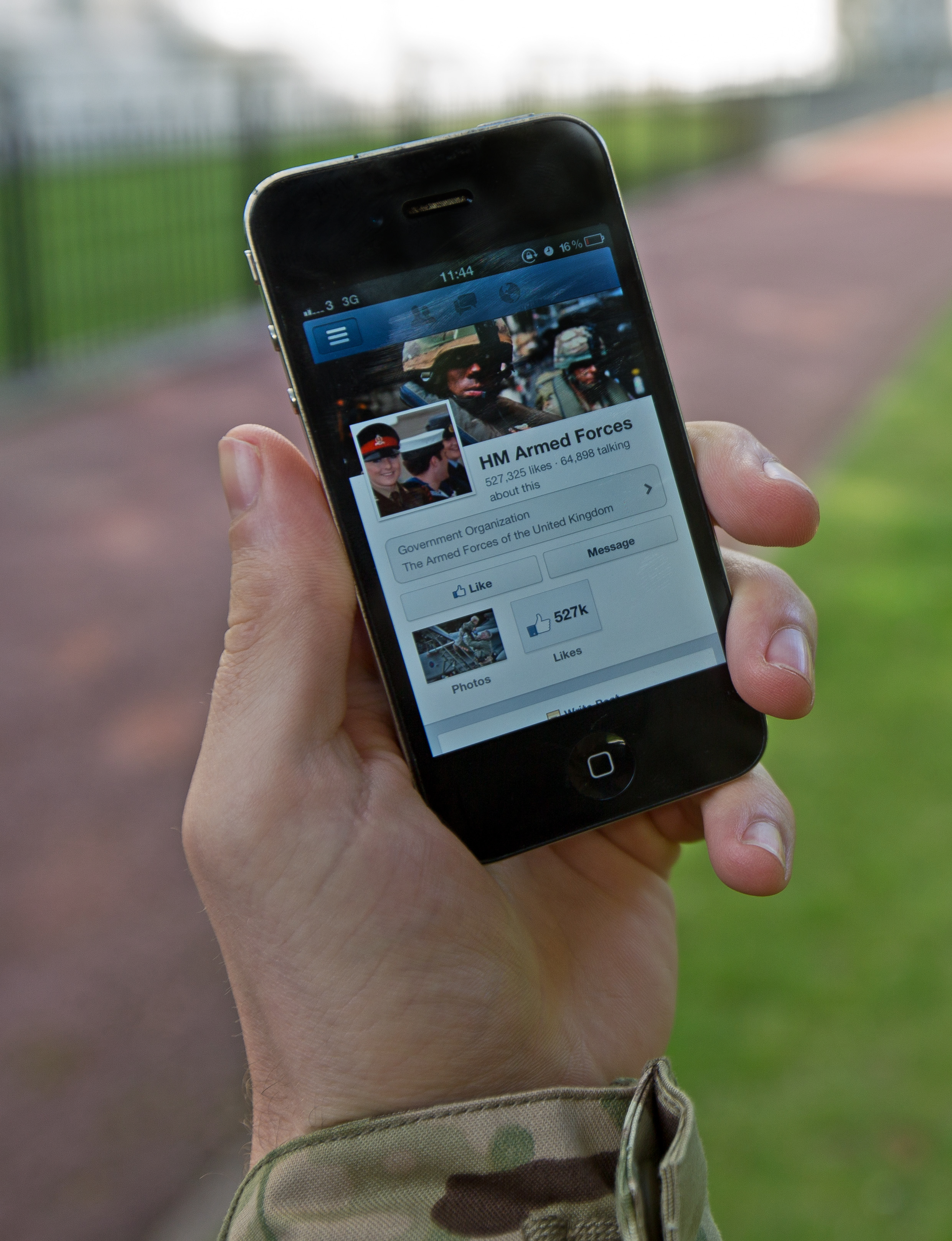
A user viewing the British Armed Forces Facebook page

A brand page (also known as a page or fan page), in online social networking parlance, is a profile on a social networking website which is considered distinct from an actual user profile in that it is created and managed by at least one other registered user as a representation of a non-personal online identity. This feature is most used to represent the brands of organizations associated with, properties owned by, or general interests favored by a user of the hosting network.

While also being potentially manageable by more than one registered user, pages are distinguished from groups in that pages are usually designed for the managers to direct messages and posts to subscribing users (akin to a newsletter or blog) and promote a brand, while groups are usually and historically formed for discussion purposes.

== History ==
Prior to 2007, only a few websites made use of non-personal profile pages. Last.fm, established in 2002, used its music recommendation service to automatically generate "artist pages" which serve as portals for biographies, events and artist-related playlists. This approach, however, is not explicitly controlled by artists or music groups because of the automatic nature of artist pages; pages, for example, could be created from erroneous misspellings and miscredits of works which are accepted as-is by the Audioscrobbler recommendation service used by Last.fm. Furthermore, Last.fm has never advertised itself as a social networking service, despite accruing myriad social features since 2002.

The most high-profile usage of this model is Facebook's Pages (formerly known as "Fan Page" until 2010) feature, launched in 2007; one could "be a fan of" a page until April 2010, when the parlance was replaced with "Like". Foursquare, a location-oriented social networking site, launched its "Brands" feature allowing for the creation of specialized brand pages in January 2010 (with Intel being the first user), but they did not become "self-serve" (controllable by individuals employed by page brand owners) until August 2011. LinkedIn, an enterprise-oriented social networking service, launched "Company Pages" in November 2010. Google+, the current social networking service operated by Google, launched its own "Pages" feature in October 2011. On November 19, 2012, Amazon announced Amazon Pages giving brands self-service control over their presence on the site. On 8 December, 2012, Twitter announced that it would roll out "brand pages" as part of a major user interface redesign in 2012.

== Features ==
Increasingly, brand pages make use of the following features:

- Header banners
- The ability to post blogs or replies on the brand page in the name of the brand page
- The ability to administer multiple pages
- Photos
- Video
- Maps (including the physical location of the page)
- Subscribers
- Other apps

Twitter made use of header banners in their launch of brand pages, and Facebook made use of "cover photos" in their re-design of brand pages in March 2011.

== Uses ==
Organizations and brands regularly make use of pages in order to syndicate news and upcoming events, especially off-site blog posts, to subscribing users. Page subscription numbers can also be used as a metric of trust or interest in the associated brand.

Interests can also be indexed as pages, and are often the basis for the formation of mass social movements (i.e., the Arab Spring, Occupy Wall Street).

=== Newsroom accounts ===
Pages are also used as newsroom accounts.

A newsroom account refers to any microblogging or social networking account branded by or owned by a publishing or broadcasting organization that is dedicated solely to syndicating content from a particular category of content as published on the original website of the organization. Such accounts have come into increased usage by news organizations as means by which:

1. A news organization's presence on a social networking or microblogging website is increased
2. A news organization can specialize content syndication to selective users who wish to subscribe

News organizations that make use of multiple newsroom accounts typically allow for either online editors or multiple employed authors to edit and update the syndications of newsroom content. Such accounts are typically marked by graphic icons that make use of the brand symbol combined with distinct colors assigned to each account.

Examples of newsroom accounts and pages include the Facebook pages for both The Guardian and the newspaper's Technology newsroom.

== Impact ==
=== Pseudonyms ===
The usage of pseudonyms on social networking services, long considered a preserve of user privacy, has been partially affected by the promotion of pseudonyms, as social networking services have encouraged users to create pages for pseudonyms and implemented legal name requirements for user profile registration (i.e., New York resident Stefani Germanotta keeping a separate personal user profile under her legal name while maintaining a fan page under her stage name and pseudonym Lady Gaga).

=== Interest-based connections ===
As pages can be created to represent interests, the number of attempts to create vertical social networking services (i.e., Ning) has leveled off in the 2010s. Social network advertising can also be targeted to users based upon their page subscriptions.

== Research ==
As of 2018, research into brand pages has looked at how the anthropomorphic cues of brand pages can affect engagement behaviour with consumers.

== See also ==
- Fansite
- Landing page
